= Pawling station =

Metro-North Railroad station in New York

Pawling
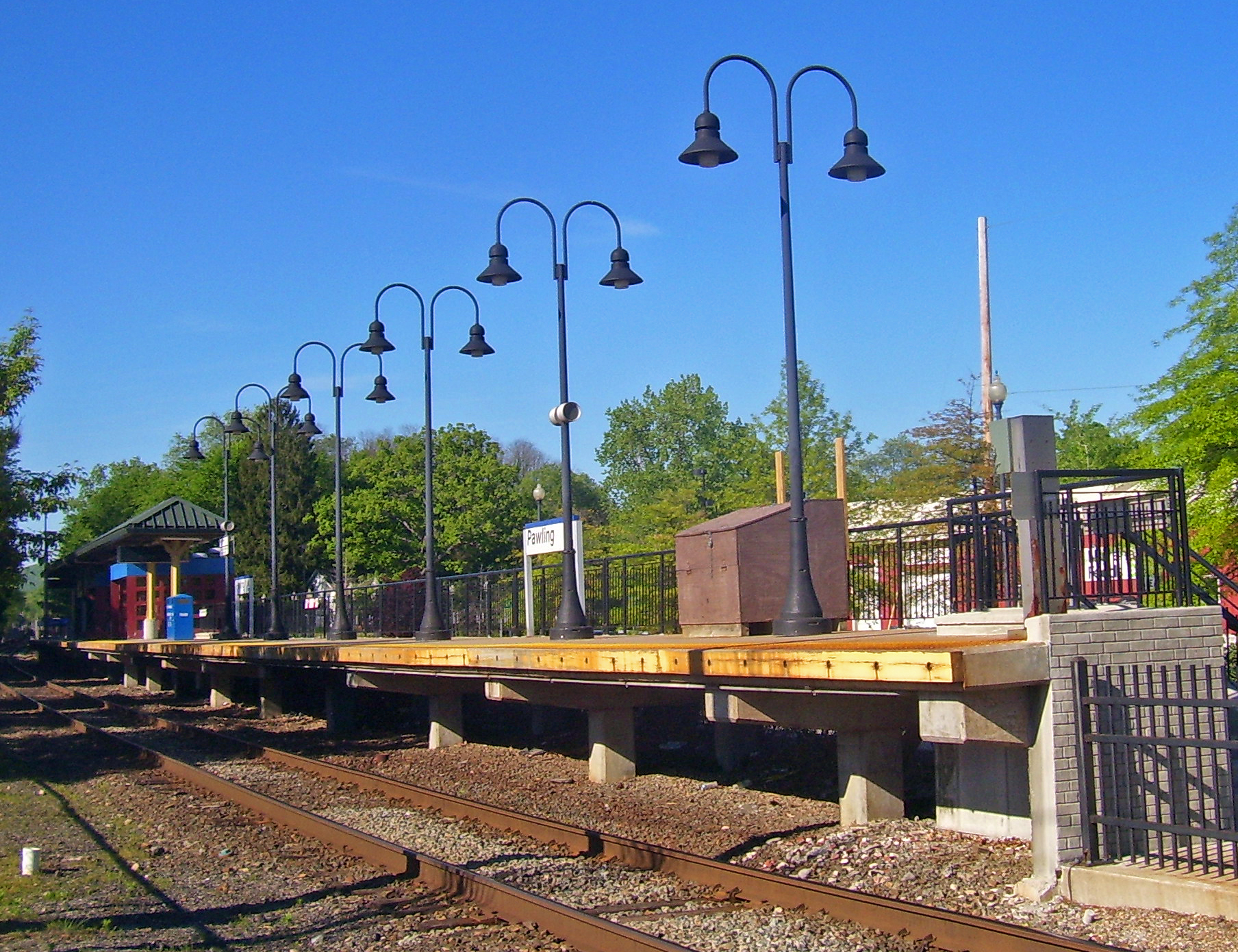
- The Pawling Metro-North station

General information
- Location: 1 Memorial Avenue, Pawling, New York
- Coordinates: 41.5646°N 73.6004°W
- Line: Harlem Line
- Platforms: 1 side platform
- Tracks: 1
- Connections: Dutchess County Public Transit: E (on Route 22)

Construction
- Accessible: yes

Other information
- Fare zone: 8

History
- Opened: December 31, 1848

Key dates
- March 11, 1977: Station agency closed
- November 30, 1984: Station depot burned

Passengers
- 2018: 218 (Metro-North)
- Rank: 91 of 109

Services
Preceding station	Metro-North Railroad	Following station
Patterson toward Southeast or Grand Central	Harlem Line limited service	Appalachian Trail toward Wassaic
Patterson toward Southeast or Grand Central	Harlem Line	Harlem Valley–Wingdale toward Wassaic

Former services
Preceding station	New York Central Railroad	Following station
Patterson toward New York	Harlem Division	State Hospital toward Chatham
Location

Pawling station is a commuter rail stop on the Metro-North Railroad's Harlem Line, located in Pawling, New York.

== History ==
Although the New York & Harlem Railroad traversed the Pawling community as early as the late 1840s, the town did not receive a dedicated passenger station until the construction of one by the New York Central & Hudson River Railroad in 1881. Despite the establishment of a nearby "Wood station" in 1860, the Pawling station became a focal point for the town's development and continued to serve passengers following the village's incorporation in 1893. The station was one of the stops on the Harlem Line for trains such as the Berkshire Hills Express, offering limited-stop service between New York City and destinations in the Berkshires region, including Pittsfield and North Adams, Massachusetts. In 1950, these direct trains were replaced by shuttle transfers.

As with the rest of the Harlem Division, the Pawling station was incorporated into the Penn Central Railroad (PC), following the 1968 merger of the New York Central and Pennsylvania railroads. PC's ongoing financial difficulties throughout the 1970s led to the transfer of its commuter services to the Metropolitan Transportation Authority (MTA), which continued operations through the formation of Conrail in 1976. The station's ticket office ceased operations on March 11, 1977. Additionally, the station depot was destroyed by fire on November 30, 1984. Presently, the former station serves as the headquarters for the local chamber of commerce.

== Station layout ==
The station consists of a four-car-long high-level side platform to the east of the track.
