= Harlem Valley–Wingdale station =

Metro-North Railroad station in New York

Harlem Valley–Wingdale
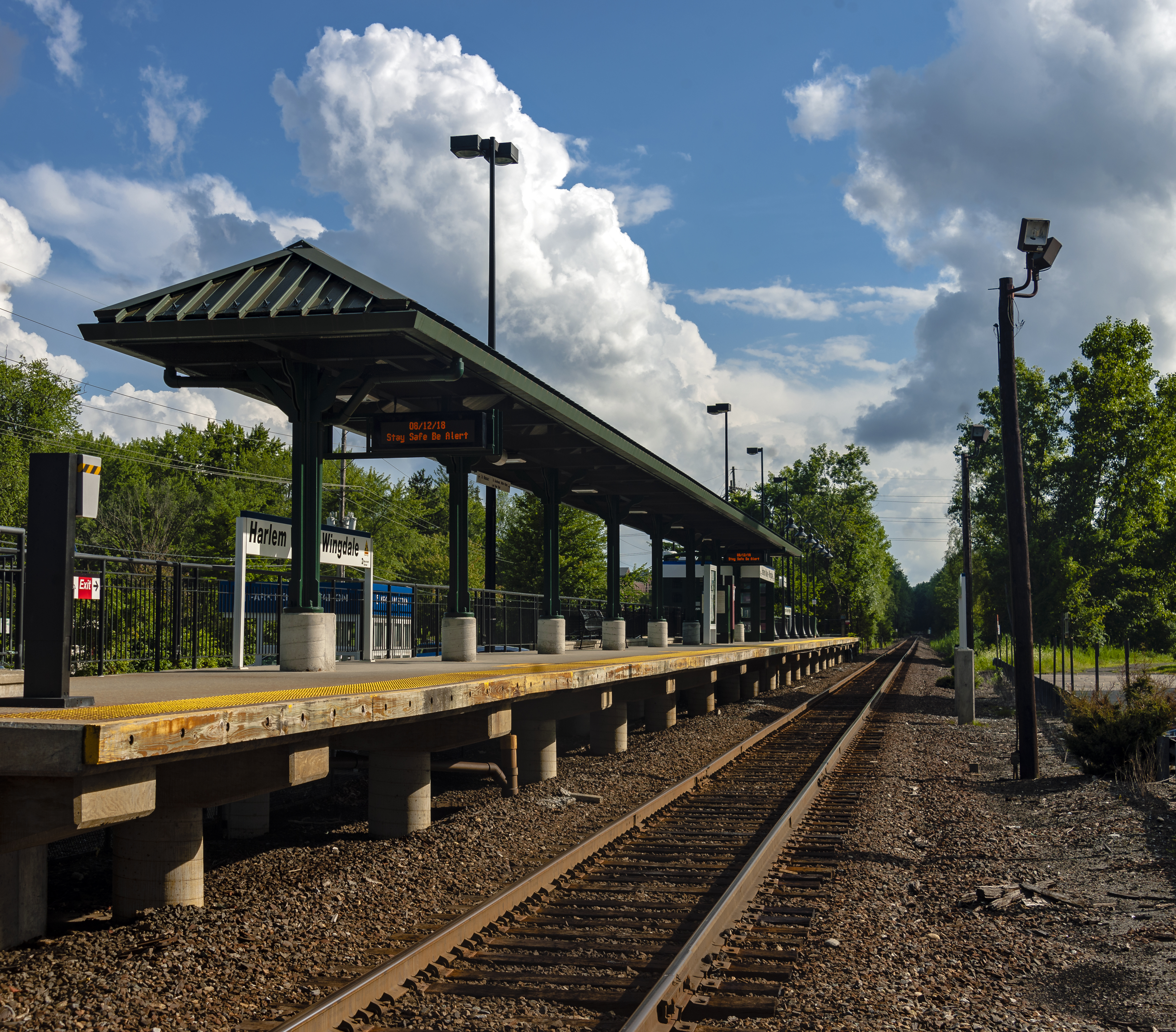
- Station from grade crossing to its north

General information
- Location: Wheeler Road off of Route 22, Wingdale, New York
- Coordinates: 41.6374°N 73.5717°W
- Line: Harlem Line
- Platforms: 1 side platform
- Tracks: 1

Construction
- Accessible: yes

Other information
- Fare zone: 9

History
- Former names: State Hospital (–October 30, 1977)

Passengers
- 2018: 132 (Metro-North)
- Rank: 97 of 109

Services
Preceding station	Metro-North Railroad	Following station
Appalachian Trail toward Southeast or Grand Central	Harlem Line limited service	Dover Plains toward Wassaic
Pawling toward Southeast or Grand Central	Harlem Line	Dover Plains toward Wassaic

Former services
Preceding station	New York Central Railroad	Following station
Pawling toward New York	Harlem Division	Dover Furnace toward Chatham
Location

Harlem Valley–Wingdale station (formerly State Hospital station) on the Metro-North Railroad's Harlem Line, located in the Wingdale section of Dover, New York. It is adjacent to the site of the former Harlem Valley State Hospital.

== History ==
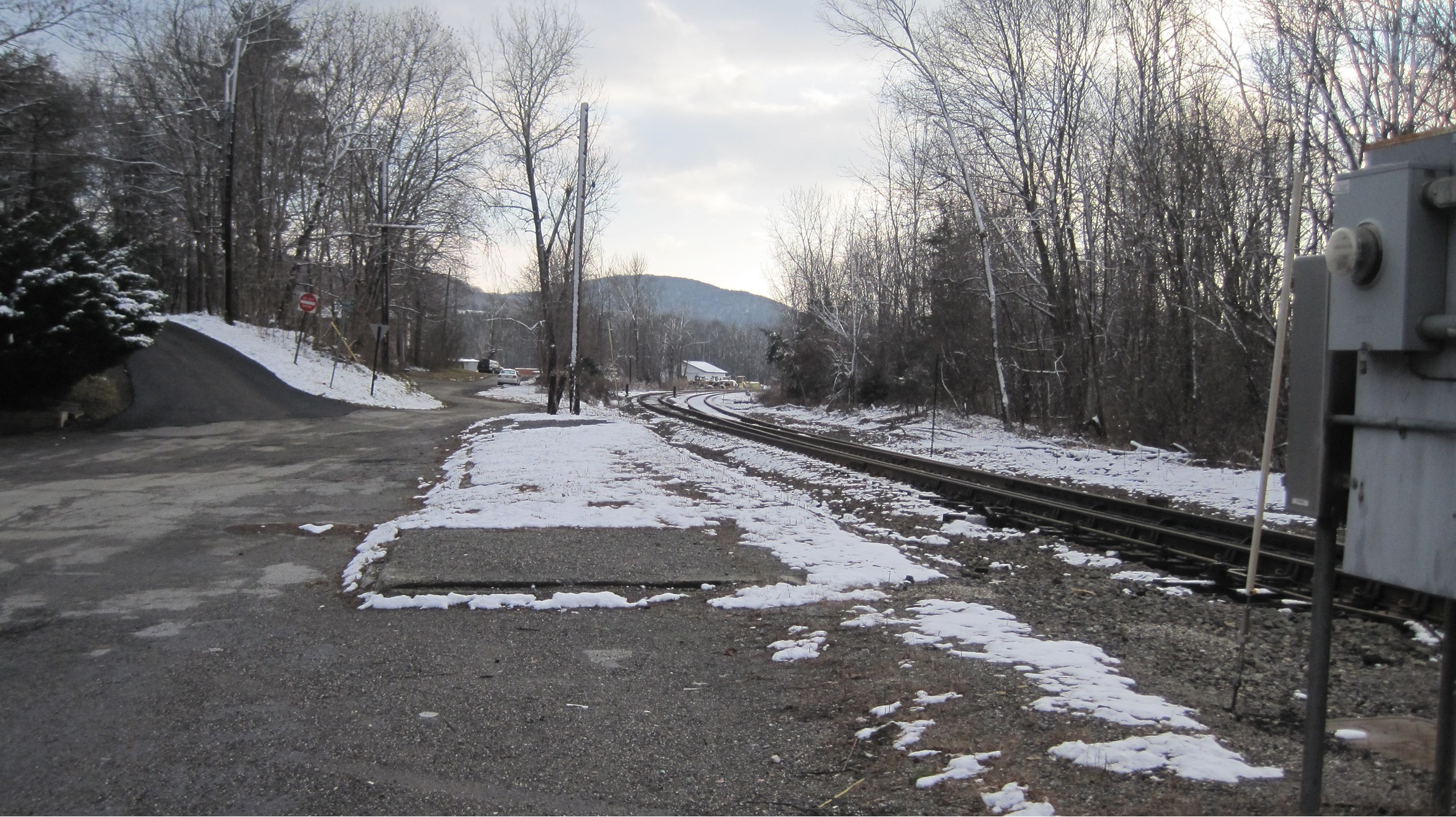
Location of the former Wingdale shelter

The station was formerly known as "State Hospital" and was a flag stop between the 1930s and 1960s. It was built to serve the Harlem Valley State Hospital, and was expanded from a simple wooden platform to a shelter with a wood-burning stove. The Wingdale station (originally known as "Wing's station," then "South Dover station") was approximately one half mile north in the hamlet on Dutchess CR 21 (Pleasant Ridge Road) and opened on December 31, 1848. It was located near such hotels as the 1806-built Jackson Wing Inn, and the 1858-built Duell Hotel, the latter of which still stands today. In the post-World War II era, the station was reduced from a station house, to a shelter along the platform.

As with most of the Harlem Line, the merger of New York Central with Pennsylvania Railroad in 1968 transformed the two stations into Penn Central Railroad stations. Penn Central's continuous financial despair throughout the 1970s forced them to turn over their commuter service to the Metropolitan Transportation Authority and abandon service north of Dover Plains. Penn Central continued to provide coal service to the hospital until it was taken over by Conrail, which continued coal service well into the 1990s. The stations were consolidated in 1977 with the State Hospital station being renamed Harlem Valley-Wingdale and the Wingdale stop being discontinued, thus transforming the station into the penultimate station on the Harlem Line, until Metro-North acquired the line in 1983, and re-extended it to Wassaic in 2000.

== Station layout ==
The station has one four-car-long high-level side platform to the east of the track. It originally contained two tracks with a separate spur leading to the coal-fueled power plant for the hospital.
