= Dover Plains station =

Metro-North Railroad station in New York

Dover Plains
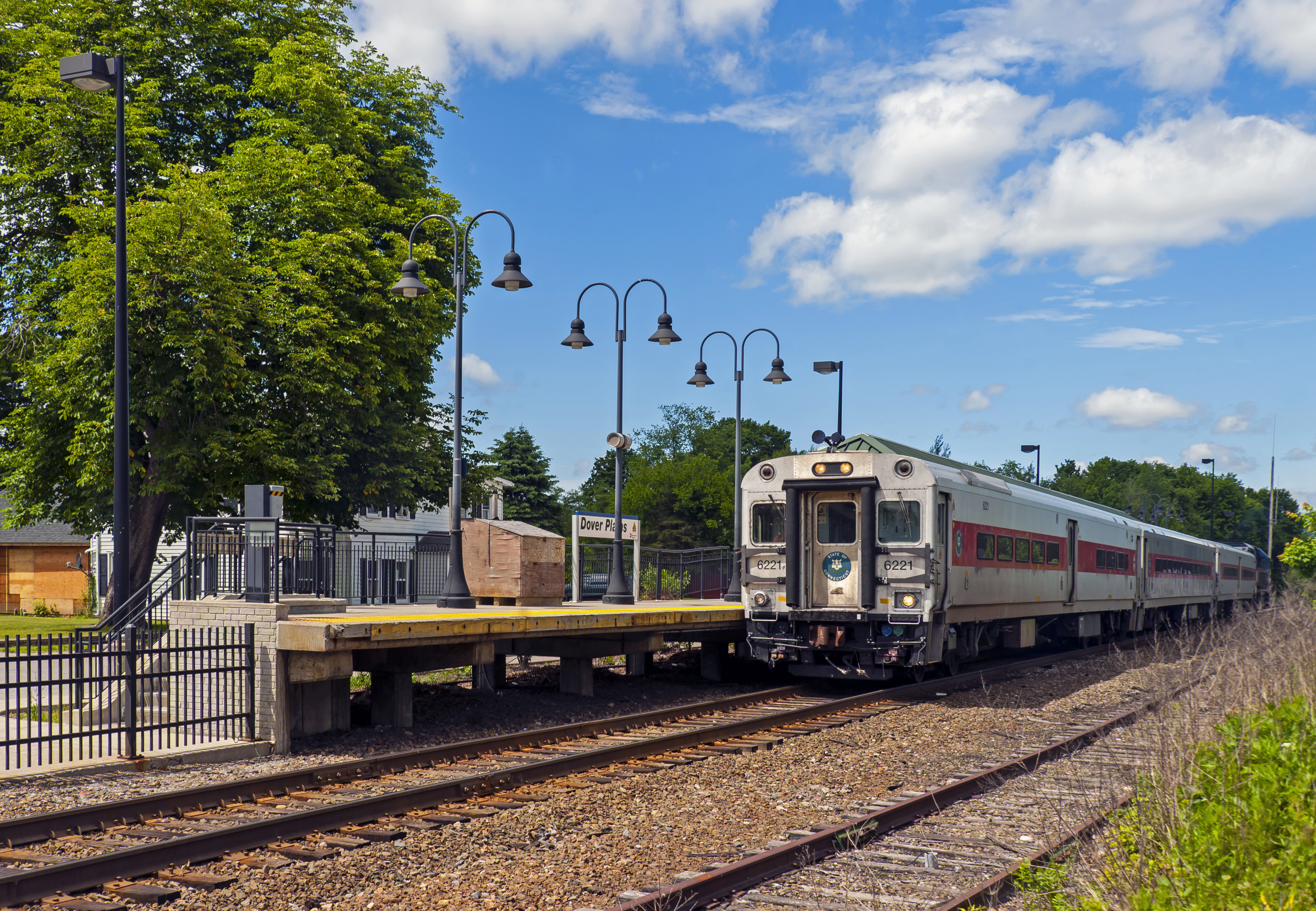
- Southbound train departing

General information
- Location: Market Street and Mill Street, Dover Plains, New York
- Coordinates: 41.7427°N 73.5762°W
- Line: Harlem Line
- Platforms: 1 side platform
- Tracks: 1
- Connections: Dutchess County Public Transit: D

Construction
- Accessible: yes

Other information
- Fare zone: 9

History
- Opened: December 31, 1848
- Rebuilt: 1860; August 19, 1996

Passengers
- 2018: 105 (Metro-North)
- Rank: 100 of 109

Services
Preceding station	Metro-North Railroad	Following station
Harlem Valley–Wingdale toward Southeast or Grand Central	Harlem Line	Tenmile River toward Wassaic

Former services
Preceding station	New York Central Railroad	Following station
Dover Furnace toward New York	Harlem Division	State School toward Chatham
Location

Dover Plains station is a commuter rail stop on the Metro-North Railroad's Harlem Line, located in Dover, New York.

== History ==
Rail service in Dover Plains can be traced as far back as December 31, 1848 with the establishment of the New York and Harlem Railroad, which became part of the New York Central and Hudson River Railroad in 1864 and eventually taken over by the New York Central Railroad (NYC).

Besides passenger service, freight service also originated and stopped at this location, in both directions north and south. It even contained a nearby railroad hotel. Under the New York Central, for the first five decades of the 20th century the station hosted through trains such as the Berkshire Hills Express to North Adams, Massachusetts via other towns in the Berkshires section of Massachusetts.

As with most of the Harlem Line, the merger of New York Central with Pennsylvania Railroad in 1968 transformed the station into a Penn Central Railroad station. Penn Central's continuous financial despair throughout the 1970s forced them to turn over their commuter service to the Metropolitan Transportation Authority and abandon service north of Dover Plains, thus transforming it into a terminal station in 1972. Freight service north of Dover Plains was abandoned by Conrail on March 27, 1980. The ticket office was closed in September 1981. The line itself became part of Metro-North in 1983. The 1860-built NYC station house contained a bagel restaurant, until it was closed in the 2010s, and left vacant, and the former freight house also still exists. Dover Plains was a terminal station until 2000 when Metro-North expanded the line back to Wassaic.

== Station layout ==
The station has one four-car-long high-level side platform to the west of the track.
