= Appalachian Trail station =

Metro-North Railroad station in New York

Appalachian Trail
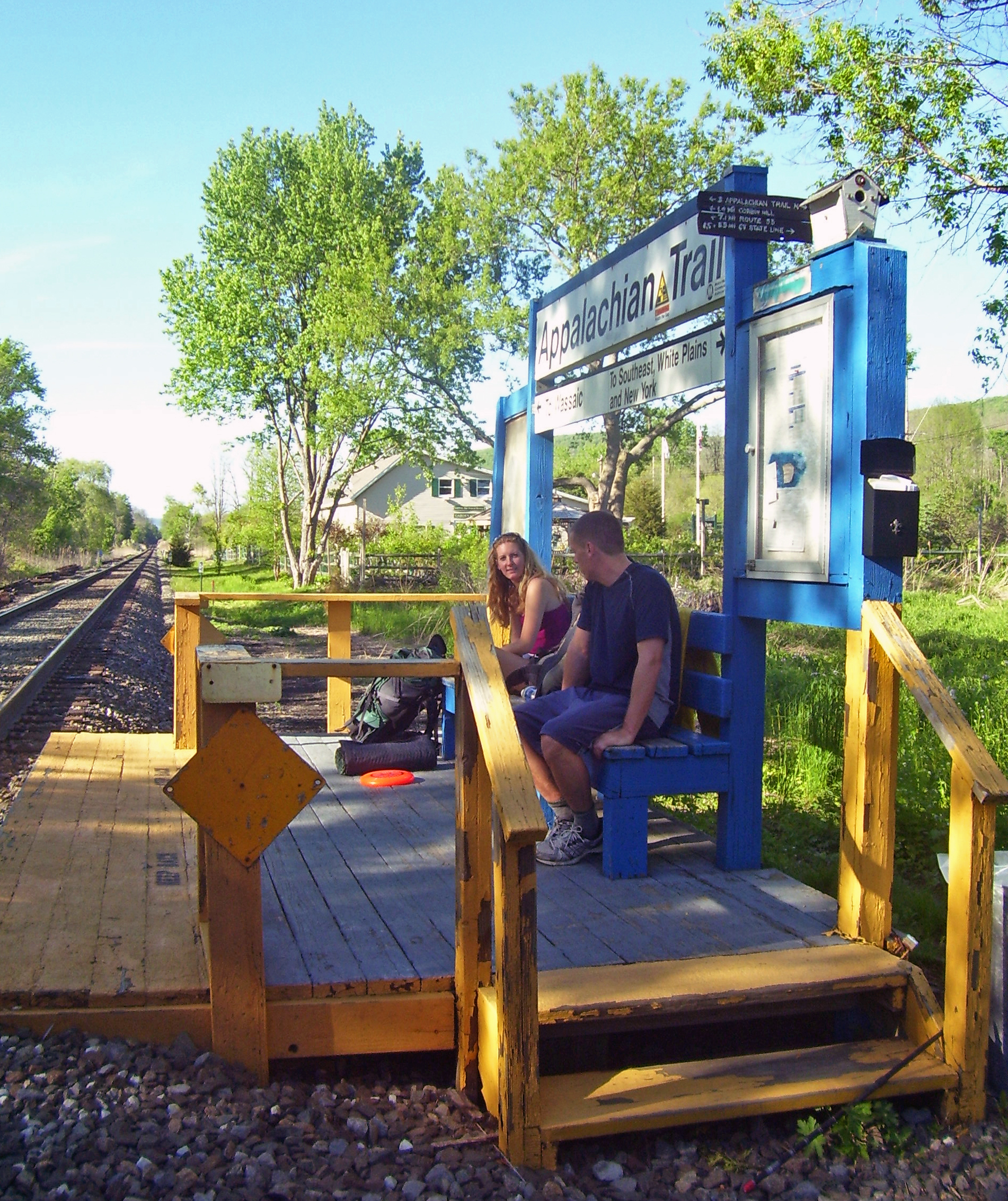
- Hikers awaiting a southbound train in 2008

General information
- Location: 991 Route 22, Pawling, New York
- Coordinates: 41.5929°N 73.5880°W
- Owner: Metropolitan Transportation Authority
- Line: Harlem Line
- Platforms: 1 side platform
- Tracks: 1

Other information
- Fare zone: 8

History
- Opened: April 1, 1990

Passengers
- 2007: 4 (weekend-only)

Services
Preceding station	Metro-North Railroad	Following station
Pawling toward Southeast or Grand Central	Harlem Line limited service	Harlem Valley–Wingdale toward Wassaic
Location

Appalachian Trail station is a commuter rail stop on the Metro-North Railroad's Harlem Line, serving campers and hikers destined for the Appalachian Trail, in Pawling, New York. It is the only rail station directly located on the Appalachian Trail. Trains stop on weekends and holidays only.

== Description and history ==
The station was built in three months by Metro-North Railroad in 1990 for the cost of $10,000. The station opened on April 1, 1990. Its creation was the suggestion of George Zoebelein, who was an avid hiker and a veteran of the NY/NJ Trail Conference as well as both the NY/NJ Appalachian Trail Conferences, and also served as a member of the Metro-North Railroad Commuter Council (MNRCC) of the Permanent Citizens Advisory Committee (PCAC) to the Metropolitan Transportation Authority. It is one of three limited service stops operated by Metro-North primarily for hikers, the other two being Breakneck Ridge and Manitou on the Hudson Line.

The trail itself crosses the track just south of the station. In the northbound direction, it leads immediately to a small grassy parking area along Route 22 with space for a few cars, then follows the highway to paved turnouts with more space a few hundred feet north along either side of the highway, just north of where it leaves the road and starts climbing toward Hammersly Ridge and the Pawling Nature Preserve. South of the station the trail crosses a swampy area via a wooden, wheelchair accessible walkway which leads to a bridge and then climbs a smaller ridge.

== Station layout ==
The station has a low-level wooden side platform to the east of the track, long enough for one door of one car to receive and discharge passengers. The platform has no shelter, but has a bulletin board for posting the current train schedule, as well as information for hikers.
