= Pawling (village), New York =

Pawling, New York
- Village
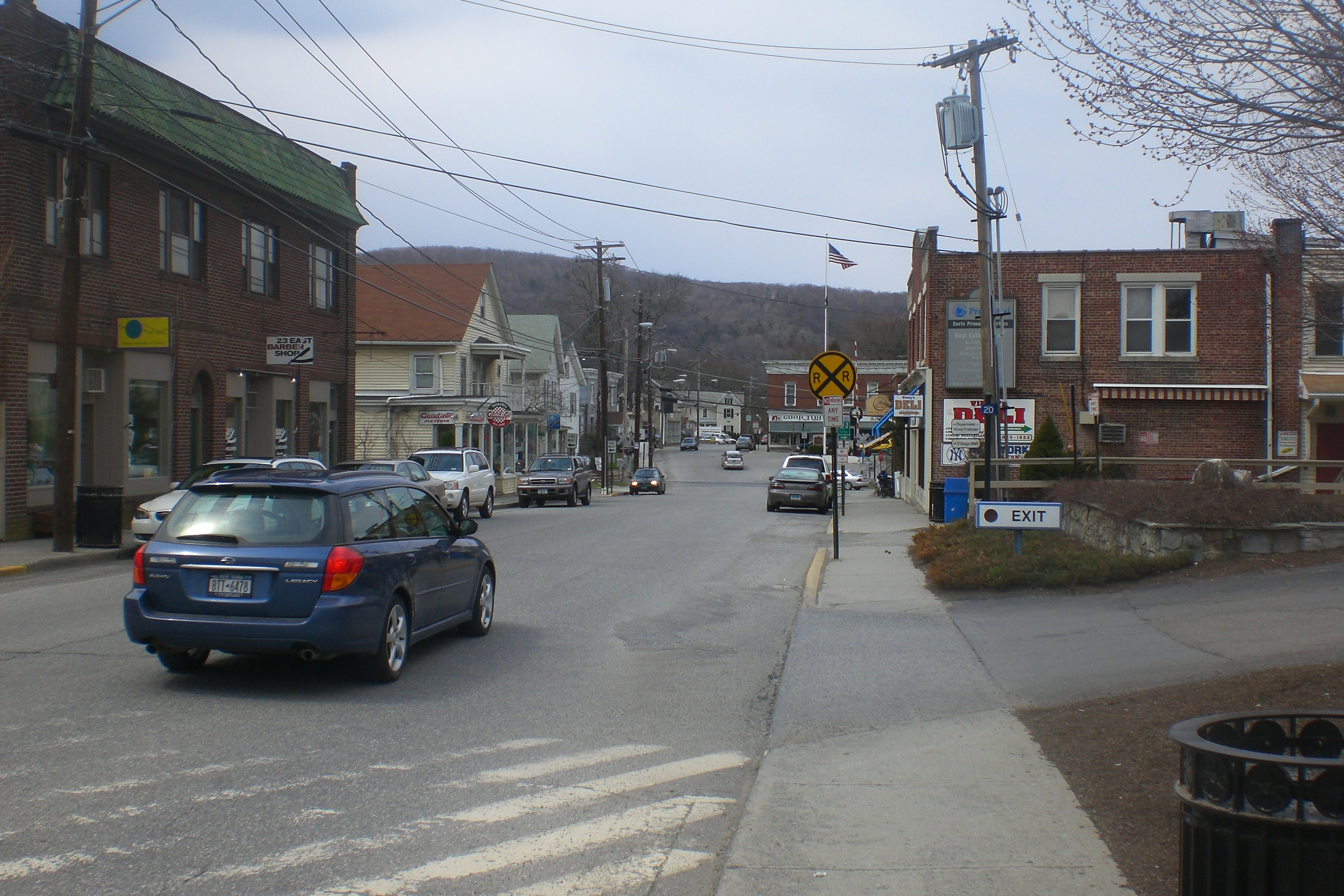
- Downtown Pawling, east of the town center

- Seal

- Location of Pawling, New York
- Coordinates: 41°33′43″N 73°35′55″W
- Country: United States
- State: New York
- County: Dutchess
- Town: Pawling

Area
  - Total: 1.95 sq mi (5.06 km^{2})
  - Land: 1.95 sq mi (5.06 km^{2})
  - Water: 0 sq mi (0.00 km^{2})
- Elevation: 463 ft (141 m)

Population (2020)
  - Total: 1,995
  - Density: 1,020.9/sq mi (394.18/km^{2})
- Time zone: UTC-5 (Eastern (EST))
  - Summer (DST): UTC-4 (EDT)
- ZIP code: 12564
- Area code: 845
- FIPS code: 36-56814
- GNIS feature ID: 0960006
- Website: www.villageofpawling.org

Pawling is a village in Dutchess County, New York, United States. The population was 1,995 at the 2020 census. It is part of the Kiryas Joel–Poughkeepsie–Newburgh metropolitan area as well as the larger New York metropolitan area. The John Kane House, a registered historic place, is situated in the village. The village was portrayed as the fictional town of Denning, New York, in the TV series Elementary.

The village of Pawling is centrally located in the town of Pawling by the junction of Routes 22 and 55.

== History ==
The village was incorporated in 1893.

Pawling also hosts the world's shortest St. Patrick's Day parade. The annual parade is held on Broad Street in the village of Pawling at a length of 223 feet.

== Geography ==
Pawling is located in southeastern Dutchess County at 41°33′43″N 73°35′54″W (41.562053, -73.598503).

According to the United States Census Bureau, the village has a total area of 2.0 square miles (5.2 km^{2}), all land.

== Government ==
Since its incorporation in 1893, Pawling has had a mayor and village board.

== Demographics ==
Historical population
Census	Pop.	Note	%±
1880	580		—
1890	630		8.6%
1900	781		24.0%
1910	848		8.6%
1920	1,032		21.7%
1930	1,204		16.7%
1940	1,446		20.1%
1950	1,430		−1.1%
1960	1,734		21.3%
1970	1,914		10.4%
1980	1,996		4.3%
1990	1,974		−1.1%
2000	2,233		13.1%
2010	2,347		5.1%
2020	1,995		−15.0%
U.S. Decennial Census

As of the census of 2000, there were 2,233 people, 919 households, and 533 families residing in the village. The population density was 1,096.4 inhabitants per square mile (423.3/km^{2}). There were 945 housing units at an average density of 464.0 per square mile (179.2/km^{2}). The racial makeup of the village was 90.77% White, 2.24% Black or African American, 0.36% Native American, 1.70% Asian, 0.13% Pacific Islander, 2.87% from other races, and 1.93% from two or more races. Hispanic or Latino of any race were 6.94% of the population.

There were 919 households, out of which 27.2% had children under the age of 18 living with them, 45.3% were married couples living together, 8.7% had a female householder with no husband present, and 42.0% were non-families. 37.2% of all households were made up of individuals, and 17.5% had someone living alone who was 65 years of age or older. The average household size was 2.31 and the average family size was 3.07.

In the village, the population was spread out, with 21.6% under the age of 18, 5.6% from 18 to 24, 28.3% from 25 to 44, 22.3% from 45 to 64, and 22.2% who were 65 years of age or older. The median age was 41 years. For every 100 females, there were 89.6 males. For every 100 females age 18 and over, there were 84.9 males.

The median income for a household in the village was $46,484, and the median income for a family was $59,896. Males had a median income of $43,266 versus $31,466 for females. The per capita income for the village was $23,512. About 5.2% of families and 7.3% of the population were below the poverty line, including 3.5% of those under age 18 and 9.6% of those age 65 or over.

== Transportation ==
Two main thoroughfares run through Pawling, state routes 22 and 55. State Route 22 runs through every town on the east side of Dutchess County and runs parallel to the business district of Pawling. Metro-North Railroad has two rail commuter rail stations in Pawling, with service to New York City via the Harlem Line, with the Pawling station in the town center, and the Appalachian Trail station, two miles north of the village of Pawling. As part of the Empire State Trail the Maybrook Trailway runs south to Brewster, and the WRS Dutchess Rail Trail runs west to Poughkeepsie.

Local transit service is available on Dutchess County Public Transit's route E to Poughkeepsie.
