= 183rd Street station (New York Central Railroad) =

New York Central Railroad's Harlem Line station (closed 1973)

183rd Street
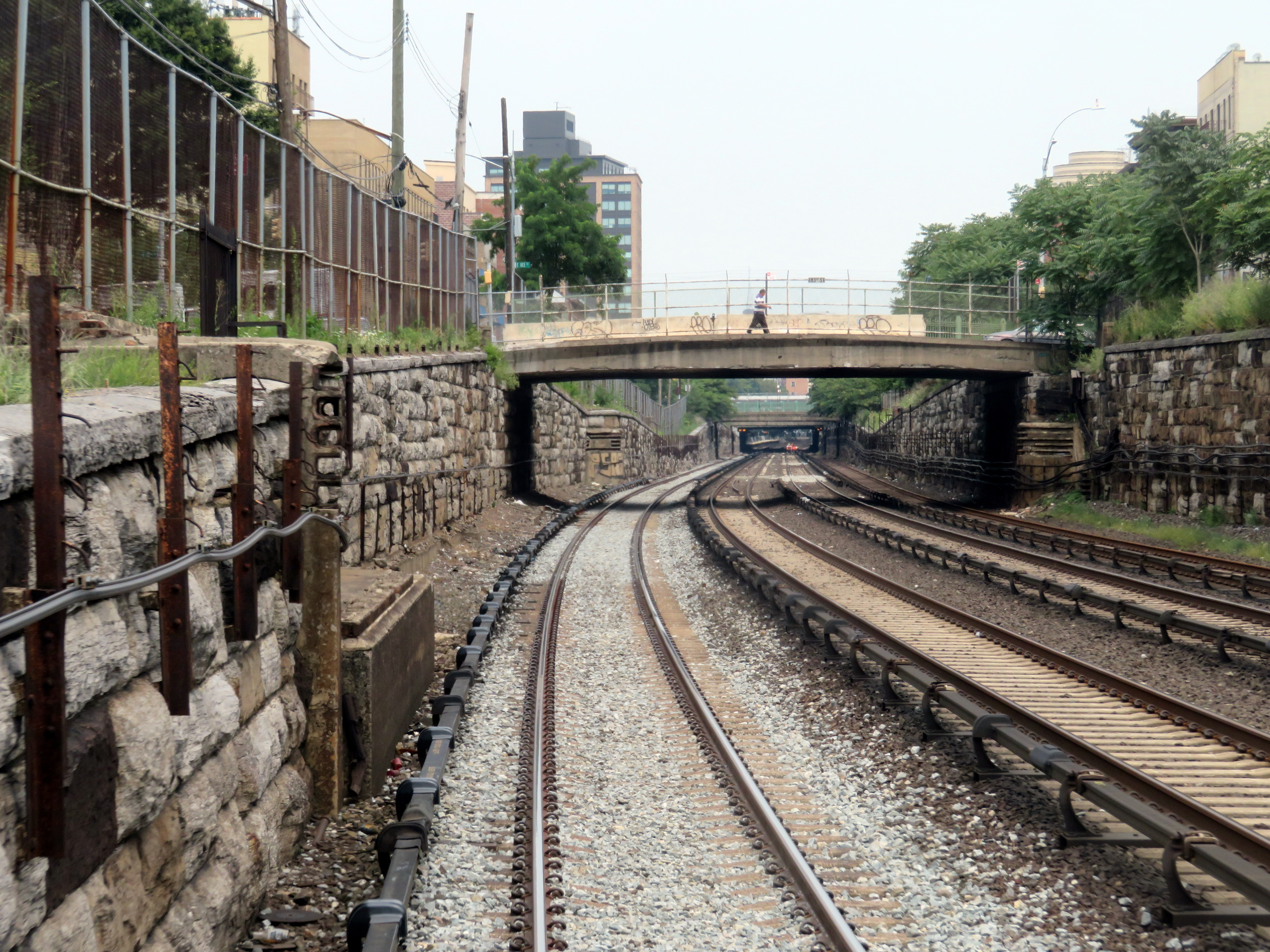
- Remains of the station platforms in July 2019

General information
- Location: Park Avenue and 183rd Street; Tremont, The Bronx, New York
- Coordinates: 40.8551°N 73.8951°W
- Owner: New York Central Railroad
- Line: Harlem Line
- Platforms: 2 side platforms
- Tracks: 4

History
- Opened: circa 1898-1901
- Closed: July 2, 1973; 53 years ago
- Electrified: 700V (DC) third rail

Former services
Preceding station	New York Central Railroad	Following station
Tremont toward New York	Harlem Division	Fordham toward Chatham
Location

The 183rd Street station was a station on the New York Central Railroad's Harlem Line, serving the neighborhoods of Fordham, Tremont and Belmont in the Bronx, New York City. The New York, New Haven and Hartford Railroad also ran through this station but did not stop here.

== History ==
=== Background ===
The New York and Harlem Railroad expanded their main line across the Harlem River through Tremont into Fordham in 1841. Stations existed both in Tremont and Fordham back then, but not at 183rd Street. The New York and Harlem was bought by the New York Central and Hudson River Railroad in 1864, but did not build a station at this location until sometime between 1898 and 1901.

=== Opening ===
On July 1, 1901, the Metropolitan Elevated Railway (later acquired by the Interborough Rapid Transit Company) extended the Third Avenue Elevated Line to Fordham Station, bringing a rapid transit connection there. Pelham Avenue station was the northern terminus of the line until it was extended to Bronx Park Terminal ten months later. As a result, the Third Avenue Railway also began to operate from Fordham Plaza converting it into the major transit hub that it is to this day. 183rd Street station was built just in time to deal with the capacity issues at Fordham Station to the north, though the Third Avenue El also had another station on 183rd Avenue nearly several blocks to the east.

=== Decline ===
On May 25, 1909, a hearing was heard on the New York Central's application to discontinue the station. In summer 1950, the Central sent a petition to the New York Public Service Commission (PSC), requesting permission to close the station. On April 10, 1951, the PSC denied the Central's request.

Declining ridership following World War II, coincided with the decline of much of the Bronx. As with other NYC stations in the Bronx, 183rd Street became a Penn Central station once the NYC & Pennsylvania Railroads merged in 1968. Penn Central acquired the New Haven Railroad in 1969, but the New Haven only stopped at nearby Fordham station, as it had been doing since the 1920s. However, because of the railroad's serious financial distress following the merger, commuter service was turned over to the Metropolitan Transportation Authority in 1972. The station was closed by Penn Central in 1972, along with 138th Street and Morrisania stations in the South Bronx.
