= Tremont station (Metro-North) =

Metro-North Railroad station in New York

Tremont
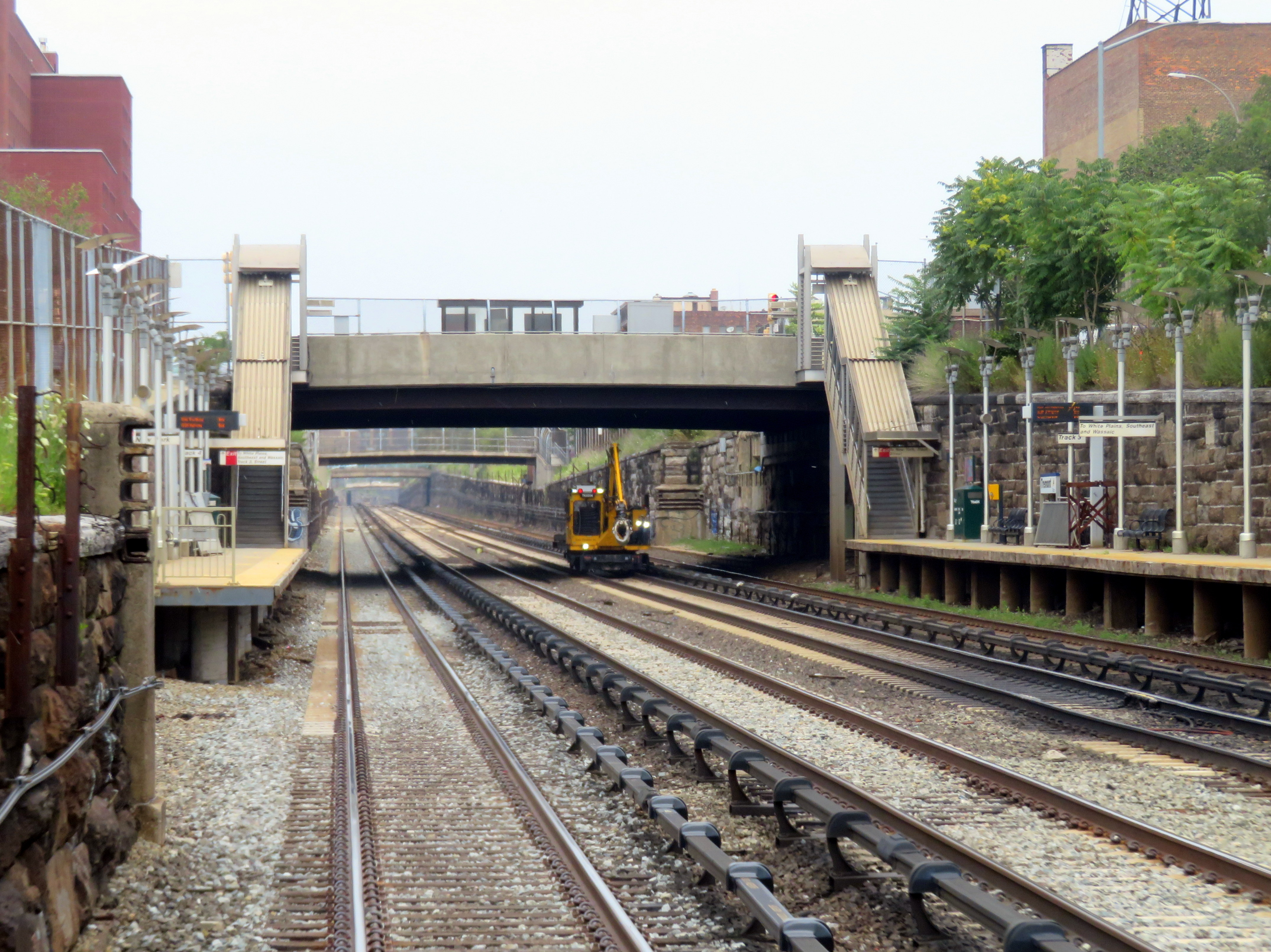
- Tremont station from a passing train in July 2019

General information
- Location: 429 East Tremont Avenue; Tremont, Bronx, New York
- Coordinates: 40.8472°N 73.8997°W
- Owner: Metro-North Railroad
- Line: Harlem Line
- Platforms: 2 side platforms
- Tracks: 4
- Connections: New York City Bus: Bx36, Bx40, Bx41, Bx41 SBS, Bx42

Other information
- Fare zone: 2

History
- Opened: c. 1841
- Electrified: 700V (DC) third rail

Key dates
- November 1999: Station depot razed

Passengers
- 2018: 174 (Metro-North)
- Rank: 95 of 109

Services
| Preceding station | Metro-North Railroad | Following station |
|---|---|---|
| Melrose toward Grand Central | Harlem Line | Fordham toward North White Plains |
New Haven Line does not stop here

Former services
| Preceding station | New York Central Railroad | Following station |
|---|---|---|
| Claremont Park toward New York | Harlem Division | 183rd Street toward Chatham |
Location

Tremont station (also known as Tremont–East 177th Street station) is a commuter rail stop on the Metro-North Railroad's Harlem Line, serving the Tremont and East Tremont sections of the Bronx, New York City. The station is in an open cut at the intersection of Park Avenue and East Tremont Avenue (East 177th Street). Service at Tremont is limited; trains stop every 30 minutes during rush hours, every hour otherwise. The station has two high-level side platforms, each two cars long, serving the outer tracks of the four-track line.

== History ==
=== Early history ===
The New York and Harlem Railroad was known to have a Tremont station as far back as 1841. When Tremont station was rebuilt by the New York Central Railroad (NYC) in the late-19th Century, it contained a station house along the north side of the 177th Street bridge over all four tracks. Similar structures were built for the former Melrose Station as well as the former Morrisania and Claremont Park stations.

=== Decline ===
As with other NYC stations in the Bronx, the station became a Penn Central station once the NYC and Pennsylvania Railroads merged in 1968. However, because of the railroad's serious financial distress following the merger, commuter service was turned over to the Metropolitan Transportation Authority in 1972.

In April 1971, a project to install high-level platforms at stations along the Harlem Line started. This was necessary as the new Metropolitan cars did not have any stairs to reach the low-level platforms. By having high-level platforms, dwell times could be cut in half. Most of the new platforms were built as island platforms. These cars started entering into service in September 1971. On September 10, 1974, the MTA announced that work would start on the construction of high-level platforms at eleven stations in Manhattan and the Bronx including at Tremont. The entire project cost $2.8 million. The work was expected to be completed in the late summer of 1975. As part of the work the stations on the Harlem Line received 340 feet (100 m)-long cast-in-place concrete platforms. On March 15, 1975, these cars started stopping at Tremont with the partial completion of its high-level platforms. However, initially they only served the station during weekends and early mornings and evenings on weekdays until the platform work was completed.

Penn Central was acquired by Conrail in 1976, and the line and station were completely turned over to Metro-North Railroad in 1983. The station house was torn down in November 1999 after years of abandonment and decay. However, the platforms and staircases leading to the East Tremont Avenue bridge remain.
