= Harlem Line =

Metro-North Railroad line in New York

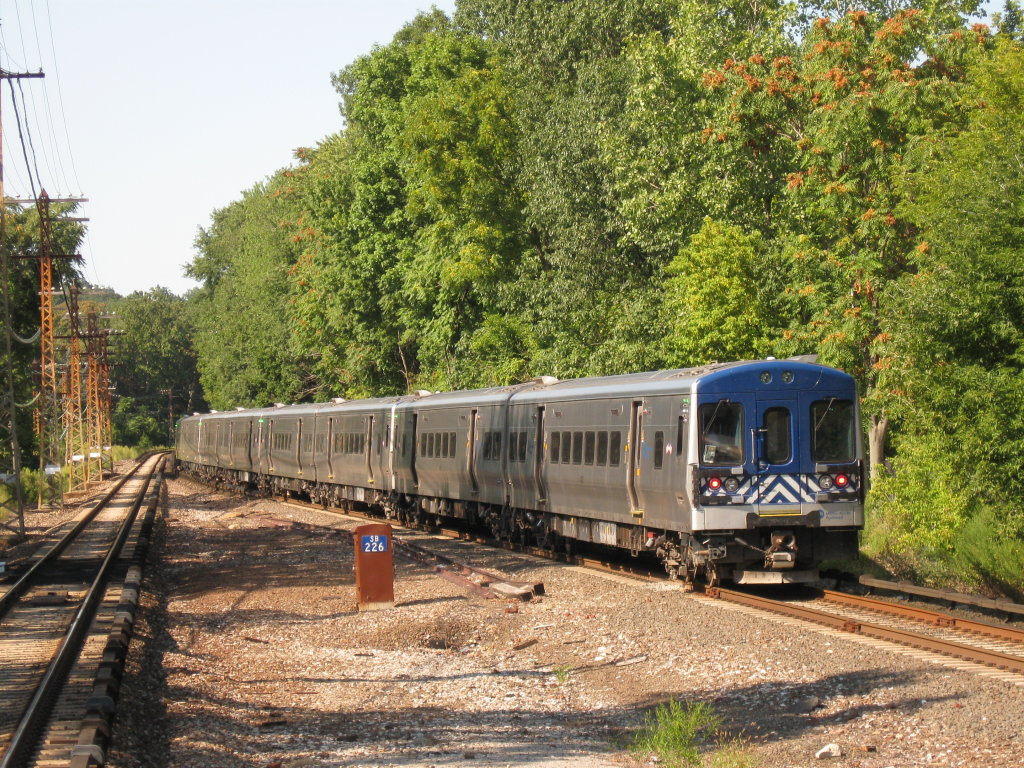
- Train No. 645 leaves the White Plains station, northbound to Southeast.

Overview
- Status: Operating
- Owner: Metropolitan Transportation Authority
- Locale: New York City, Westchester, Putnam, and Dutchess counties
- Termini: Grand Central; Crestwood (short-turn) North White Plains (short-turn) Southeast Wassaic
- Stations: 38

Service
- Type: Commuter rail
- System: Metro-North Railroad
- Operator: Metro-North Railroad
- Daily ridership: 56,508 (Fall 2024)
- Ridership: 20,440,700 (annual ridership, 2024)

Technical
- Track length: 82 mi (132 km)
- Num of tracks: 1–4
- Character: Commuter rail
- Track gauge: 4 ft 8 1/2 in (1,435 mm) standard gauge
- Electrification: Third rail, 750 V DC (south of Southeast)
Route map
Harlem Line highlighted in blue

The Harlem Line is an 82-mile (132 km) commuter rail line owned and operated by the Metro-North Railroad in the U.S. state of New York. It runs north from New York City to Wassaic, in eastern Dutchess County. The lower 53 miles (85 km) from Grand Central Terminal to Southeast, in Putnam County, is electrified with a third rail and has at least two tracks. The section north of Southeast is a non-electrified single-track line served by diesel locomotives. Before the renaming of the line in 1983, it eventually became the Harlem Division of the New York Central Railroad. The diesel trains usually run as a shuttle on the northern end of the line, except for rush-hour express trains in the peak direction (two to Grand Central in the morning, two from Grand Central in the evening).

The Harlem Line has 38 stations, the most of any Metro-North main line. Its northern terminal, Wassaic, is the northernmost station in the system. It is the only Metro-North line used exclusively by that carrier (no use by Amtrak, though CSX services freight customers as far north as Mount Vernon) and the only one that uses the entirety of existing track. It is colored blue on Metro-North timetables and system maps, and stations on the line have blue trim. The blue color-coding appears to have started with timetables issued by predecessor New York Central for the then-Harlem Division as far back as 1965.

The Harlem Line was originally chartered in 1831 as the New York and Harlem Railroad (NY&H) and was leased to the New York Central and Hudson River Railroad Company in 1871. The line became part of the Metro-North Railroad in 1983. While the line has traditionally served to bring commuters from Westchester County to jobs in the city, since the 2000s it has begun to see more "reverse commuting" from the Bronx into Westchester and points north. The northern reaches of the line are also close enough to Western Massachusetts that residents in parts of that region are also able to commute to jobs in New York City.

== Line description ==
The Harlem Line hews closely to roads along river-based transportation corridors dating back to even pre-rail times. It follows three major parkways closely from the Bronx northwards through Westchester: the Bronx River Parkway (and a short portion that becomes the Taconic State Parkway), the Saw Mill River Parkway and Interstate 684. In the last section it also begins to run close to NY 22, the long north–south two-lane state highway that parallels the eastern border of the state. In Westchester, it serves some of that county's most affluent communities as it slowly trends eastward.

=== Manhattan and the Bronx ===
The Harlem Line begins underground with the Hudson and New Haven Lines at Grand Central Terminal, on the Park Avenue main line. The tracks emerge above ground north of 97th Street and run on an elevated viaduct starting at 102nd Street in Manhattan. After stopping at Harlem–125th Street, the Metro-North lines cross the Harlem River at 135th Street in Manhattan, entering the Bronx via the Park Avenue Bridge. The Hudson Line splits off at this point to travel northwest along the Harlem River, while the Harlem and New Haven diverges into open-cut north of 144th Street.

In the Bronx, the Harlem and New Haven Lines cut through the neighborhoods of the southwest Bronx, with two stations: Melrose, at 162nd Street (it then runs under the Cross Bronx Expressway (I-95) and Tremont, at 177th Street. Fordham station is next, at Fordham Road (190th Street). The tracks rise to ground level after the stop at Fordham. The lines then parallel the western edge of Fordham University until the Botanical Garden station at Bedford Park Boulevard (200th Street). The tracks then cut northeast to join the Bronx River Parkway, which lies to the east of the tracks. The Williams Bridge station is next, at Gun Hill Road (210th Street). After the Williams Bridge station, Woodlawn Cemetery begins to the west of the tracks, with Webster Avenue in between the cemetery and tracks. The Woodlawn station is at 233rd Street, and it is north of here that the New Haven Line diverges east to head towards the Northeast Corridor.

The Harlem Line then goes under a bridge for the parkway, and it remains to the west of the tracks until Scarsdale station. The Wakefield station at 241st Street concludes the Bronx portion of the Harlem Line.

=== Westchester County ===
The Westchester portion of the Harlem Line begins at Bronx River Road in southeastern Yonkers. After the Mount Vernon West station, the line runs along the on-ramp to the Cross County Parkway eastbound, right before Fleetwood station. After the Bronxville station, the tracks parallel the Bronx River Parkway all the way up to White Plains.

From White Plains, the railroad winds its way through the city and passing through the yards at North White Plains, which was the northern boundary of third-rail electrification until 1984. The stretch north of North White Plains is unique because it is the only third-rail electrified stretch of Metro-North's network that has grade crossings, a byproduct of its existence pre-electrification. Katonah and Brewster stations are located right next to grade crossings.

After North White Plains, the next station is Valhalla adjacent to the Taconic State Parkway. The double-track line then curves to follow the Saw Mill River Valley and the eponymous parkway. Rail and road briefly separate at Mount Kisco, but then remain close by at the last stop along the Saw Mill, Bedford Hills (although the parkway cannot be seen from the station).

Past Katonah, the railroad runs between the Croton River and I-684. Golden's Bridge and Purdy's are both located very close to the interstate, although only the former can be seen from it. North of the latter, the tracks follow the river to Croton Falls, and pick up Route 22 for the first time.

=== Putnam County ===
After Croton Falls, the Harlem Line runs along East Branch Reservoir and crosses into Putnam County and its rural landscape. Above Brewster station, the railroad passes through the yards at Putnam Junction to Southeast station, which was formerly known as Brewster North. This is the northern boundary of third rail electrification.

North of Southeast, the line operates with a single track and uses diesel powered trains. Prior to the 2010s, the branch was not signaled, and manual block system rules were used to direct train movements; however, positive train control was installed in the late 2010s. The track finally follows its own course, away from any road or river, past the former Dykemans and abandoned Towners stations up to Patterson and into Dutchess County.

=== Dutchess County ===
Shortly before reaching Pawling, the line enters the Harlem Valley (which takes its name from the railroad) and begins to parallel Route 22, although not as closely as it did the roads further south. A few miles north of Pawling, the Appalachian Trail crossing has its own stop to allow thru-hikers to take a break in the city and day hikers to visit the nearby Pawling Nature Preserve.

The next two stops, Harlem Valley–Wingdale and Dover Plains, are roughly eight miles (13 km) apart, the longest distance between any two stops on the Harlem Line. From 1972 to 2000, Dover Plains was the last stop on the line, but then tracks remaining from the NYCRR era that had not yet been torn up were renovated and the line was extended to Tenmile River and its new northern terminus, Wassaic. The total travel time between Grand Central and Wassaic is 2 hours on a peak through train.

A small yard where diesel trains await their routes just past the station marks the end of the line.

== History ==
=== Origin as a streetcar line ===
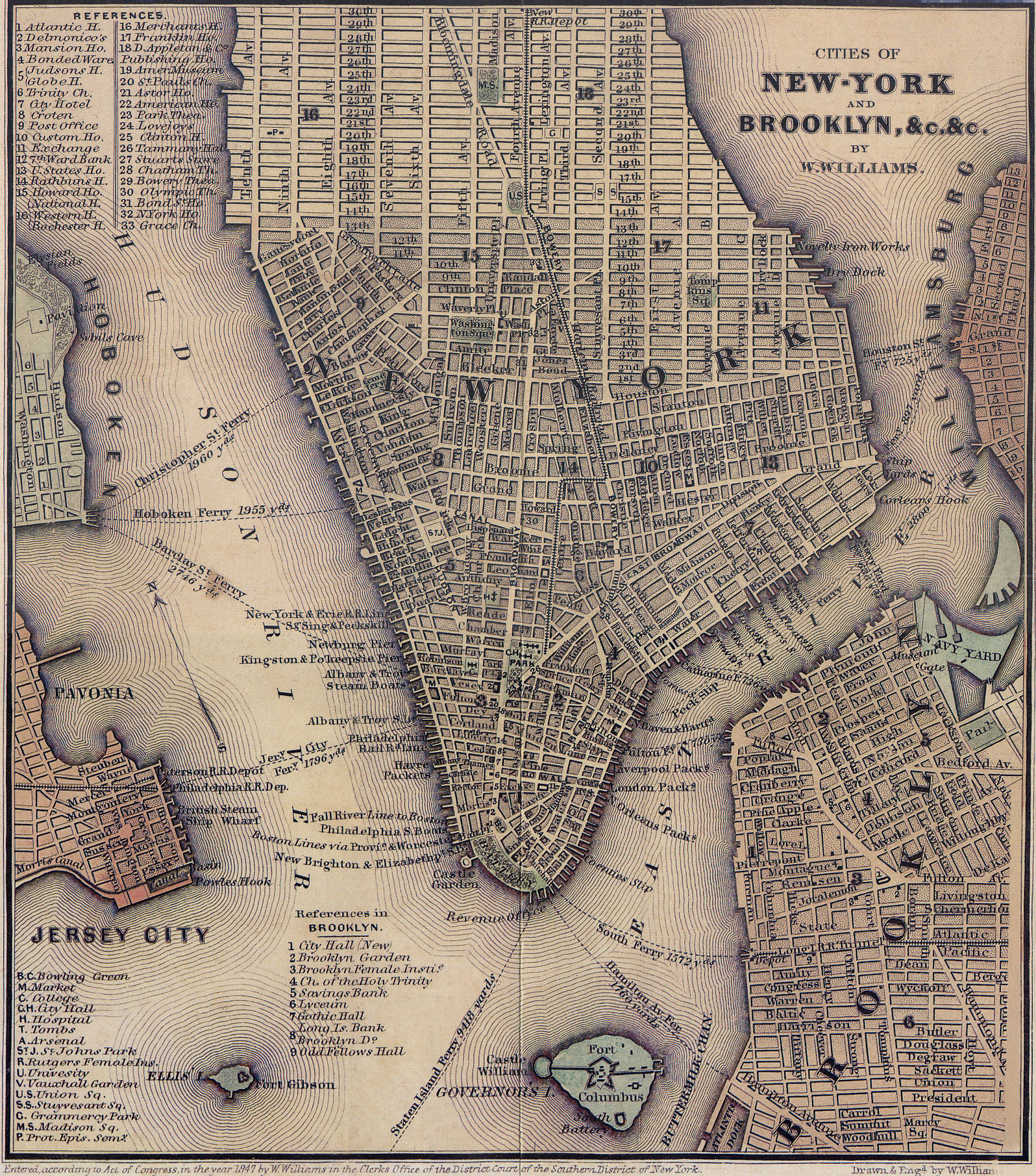
An 1847 map of Lower Manhattan; the only railroad in Manhattan at that time was the New York and Harlem Railroad

The Harlem Line in its current form originated from the New York and Harlem Railroad (NY&H), which was the first streetcar company in the United States. It was franchised, on April 25, 1831, to run between the original city core in lower Manhattan to the suburb of Harlem, several miles to the north on Manhattan Island. The railroad's charter allowed the line to run between 23rd Street and any point on the Harlem River between Eighth and Third Avenue, with a branch running to the Hudson River, encompassing most of the island.

While the company wanted to run the line as a steam line, the city made it use horse power south of 14th Street. On September 13, 1831, the board of directors of the railroad approved its route along Fourth Avenue (renamed Park Avenue on March 1, 1888) from 23rd Street to the Harlem River. On April 6, 1832, the railroad's charter was amended to allow the line to be extended south to 14th Street.

On May 2, 1832, the City Common Council secretly granted the railroad the right to lay track along Broadway to City Hall and Bowling Green. There was a public outcry once this was found out by the general public, and at the time a fraudulent map was circulated showing that the railroad would take up 23 feet (7.0 m) of the street when it would only take up 5 feet (1.5 m). Newspaper editors also came out against the railroad's plan. In Spring 1833, the railroad published a pamphlet to refute objections to their plan titled "A Statement of Facts in Relation to the Origin, Progress, and Prospects of the New-York and Harlem Railroad Company." On March 1, 1833, a meeting was held in Tammany Hall concerning the issue, and at the meeting cab drivers and owners came out against the railroad. After the meeting, the crowd tore up some of the railroad's track. After the meeting, the council withdrew its Broadway agreement with the railroad. The railroad was extended downtown in 1839, but along a different route.

Ground was broken on the construction of the line on February 23, 1832, at Murray Hill on Fourth Avenue. At the ceremony, Vice President of the railroad, John Mason hinted at the railroad's ambitions saying that while the railroad's principal objective was local, its higher importance was to get to Albany. In 1832 the company was given permission to raise its stock limit to $500,000, equal to $16,125,000 today. In November, two horsecars built by John Stephenson were ready for operation, both of which were named after the railroad's president ("John Mason" and "President").

On April 27, 1837, an act was passed in the State Legislature to widen Fourth Avenue between 32nd Street and the Harlem River to provide room for the railroad. The street was widened by 20 feet (6.1 m) on either side, making the street 140 feet (43 m) wide. The company ceded the title for the land that would be occupied by Fourth Avenue to the city in exchange for permission to occupy it. In that same year, the railroad purchased six city lots at Fourth Avenue and 26th Street for $7,000 for the construction of car barns and stables.

The first section, along Bowery from Prince Street north to 14th Street, consisting of .85 miles (1.37 km), opened to the public on November 26, 1832. On that day a demonstration showing the car's braking ability was conducted, but inadvertently, one horsecar rear-ended into another with no serious injuries. This might have been the first rear-end collision in the United States. Service was then extended northward along Fourth Avenue to 32nd Street on June 10, 1833. The Murray Hill rock cut was completed in 1834, and service along a 4.432 miles (7.133 km)-long segment to 85th Street in Yorkville opened on May 1, 1834. Service ran every 15 minutes between 5 a.m. and 8 pm, and ran every 60 minutes to 10 pm. A one-way fare cost 12.5 cents Service was extended 2 miles (3.2 km) to finally reach Harlem on October 26, 1837, with the Yorkville Tunnel constructed to reach this point. At the time, Harlem was just a small suburb of the city. Service was also extended further south. On May 4, 1839, the line was extended south along Bowery, Broome Street and Centre Street to City Hall at Centre Street and Park Row. Service was extended south on November 26, 1852, along Park Row to Astor House at Park Row and Broadway.

=== Extension toward Albany ===
The New York and Albany Railroad had been granted its charter on April 17, 1832, allowing it to build a single or double-track line from Greenbush (on the opposite side of the Hudson River from Albany) to New York along the Harlem River. In 1836, an amendment to its charter granted it the right to enter Manhattan along a route that they "may deem most eligible"–direct competition to the NY&H. The NY&A had periods of inactivity, in part due to the financial panic of 1837. Surveys were completed in some places, and ground was broken in various areas. Gouverneur Morris, a vice president and Director of the NY&A, reached an agreement with the Harlem. The NY&H would pay the NY&A's expenses on surveying with the understanding that the NY&H would be extended to Greenbush. The deal was completed on February 28, 1840, and on May 7, 1840, the New York State Legislature granted the Harlem the right to extend into Westchester County, which at the time included what is now The Bronx. The corporate life of the NY&A ended on March 9, 1846, when it was bought by the Harlem.

The line was not being completed as quickly as its charter required, so the New York State Legislature granted it multiple extensions to allow for the work to be completed. The last time an extension was granted was on April 11, 1842. The New York and Harlem Railroad bought that company for $35,000 on March 9, 1846, as it had failed to make any progress on the construction of the line. The right-of-way and land for that line was sold as part of this transaction, on which, it built its line into Westchester, Putnam, Dutchess, and Columbia Counties.

Service was extended into Westchester in multiple stages. The line was first extended north 4 miles (6.4 km) into Westchester on December 14, 1840, before reaching Fordham on March 1, 1841. Extended service reached Williams Bridge on September 3, 1842, and then in the summer of 1844, the line reached Tuckahoe. On December 1, 1844, the line's terminus became White Plains, but in October 1846, trains began ending their runs at Pleasantville. Service reached Mount Kisco and Croton Falls, in February 1847, and on June 1, 1847, respectively. On December 31, 1848, Harlem Railroad service was extended to Dover Plains, providing service to parts of Putnam County and Dutchess County.

In 1845, the railroad's charter was amended to allow the route to be extended north to Albany.

On May 10, 1852, the line was extended north to Chatham Four Corners in Columbia County with a connection to the Boston and Albany Railroad, and trackage rights northwest to Albany. In the years following, the Harlem Railroad ran some of its trains over the Boston and Albany Railroad from Chatham to Albany. Additional connections could be made to railroads serving North Bennington, Vermont and other points in western Vermont. Chatham is about 52 miles (84 km) past the current terminal at Wassaic. In Boston Corners, about 12 miles (19 km) north of Wassaic, passengers could make connections to the Central New England Railway (CNE). To the east, the CNE went to Hartford, Connecticut. Westward, passengers could travel to Poughkeepsie, cross the Poughkeepsie Bridge, finally to Campbell Hall.

A 1.84 miles (2.96 km)-long freight branch, from the 1853 purchase of the Spuyten Duyvil and Port Morris Railroad, was built to Port Morris.

When the Grand Central Depot opened in 1871, the depot that the line used was changed from being at 26th Street and Fourth Avenue to Grand Central Depot at 42nd Street.

=== Under the New York Central ===
==== Grade separation and expansion ====
On April 1, 1873, the New York and Harlem Railroad was leased for 401 years to the New York Central and Hudson River Railroad Company. The line then became the Harlem Division of the New York Central. The lease did not include the portion of the line using horse cars. Horse cars were replaced with an underground trolley system in 1897, when it was leased to the Metropolitan Street Railway Company.

In 1875, the line was grade-separated and put in an open cut and a viaduct between Grand Central and the Harlem River to reduce the loss of life and to increase speeds. The work was completed for $6 million, of which half was paid by the city.

On May 15, 1876, partial rapid transit began on the Harlem Line, with sixteen trains a day running between Grand Central Depot and William's Bridge. These trains made all stops between Grand Central and William's Bridge, with the exception of Jerome Park, which was skipped by half the trains. This was in addition to eight regular trains per day that stopped at William's Bridge. Two new stations were opened at 86th Street and 110th Street, both being exclusively served by the rapid transit service.

In 1888, work began on a project to grade-separate 7 miles (11 km) of the line from Mott Haven to Bedford Park, and to expand the line from two tracks to four tracks, with the additional tracks to be reserved for express trains, doubling the line's capacity. This project was funded entirely by the railroad, and was reached in an agreement with the New York City Department of Public Works, titled the "Harlem Depression Agreement", with the railroad paying for the construction of bridges over the now-depressed line. Service on the Harlem Line was expected to double. Express trains were expected to go at least 30 miles per hour (48 km/h), while locals were expected to go at least 20 miles per hour (32 km/h). 4.5 miles (7.2 km) of the line were put into a cut 12 to 14 feet (3.7 to 4.3 m) below the line's existing grade, starting 500 feet (150 m) north of 138th Street to 2,000 feet (610 m) north of Bedford Park station. Upon completion, there was a four track line from Woodlawn Junction to Grand Central. The line's cost was initially anticipated to be $2 million. On July 10, 1890, as part of the line's grade-separation project in the Bronx, the third track between Mott Haven and Fordham was completed. At the time, the four tracks between Woodlawn Junction and the Harlem River were almost completed, with a few hundred yards of rails needed to make some connections. The four tracks were expected to be completed on July 13. The New Haven Railroad planned to build a flyover at Williamsbridge for northbound trains so that their trains would not have to cross the other three tracks at grade. The rebuilt rapid transit stations were not yet completed. The entire project cost about $4 million.

On February 15, 1897, trains on the Harlem Division started running over the new drawbridge over the Harlem River and the elevated structure connecting to it. As part of the project, the line north of 106th Street to the Harlem River was elevated so that it could reach the height of the new four-track drawbridge: the only one in the country at the time. The project was known as the Park Avenue Improvement. The new line went via a steel viaduct, replacing a masonry viaduct and an open cut. The 400 feet (120 m) bridge was built for about $500,000 by the King Bridge Company. The new bridge is 24 feet (7.3 m) higher than the old bridge, as mandated by the Federal Government. During the course of construction, trains ran over a temporary wooden structure along with a temporary wooden drawbridge. The station at Mott Haven on the Bronx side of the Harlem River had to be elevated. The entire cost was $2 million.

On October 15, 1897, a spacious new station in Harlem was opened at 125th Street, replacing a small, dingy station in the old Park Avenue open cut. The new station was built atop the old open cut and directly under the new Park Avenue Viaduct. The platforms on the viaduct were built to be 400 feet (120 m) long.

As part of the construction of Grand Central Terminal in the early 1900s, all of New York Central's lines that ran into the terminal were electrified. Third rail was installed on the Hudson and Harlem Divisions, while the New Haven Division received overhead wires on the segments that were not shared with the Harlem and Hudson Division. In November 1907, the first electric train operated on the Harlem Division, running between Grand Central Terminal and Wakefield. On October 10, 1909, the New York Central began installing third rail between Mount Vernon and White Plains. On March 14, 1910, electric service was extended to North White Plains. Passengers that used the Upper Harlem Division were attracted to this cleaner, faster service.

In July 1909, the New York State Public Service Commission ordered that the New York Central Railroad eliminate grade crossings at Hamilton Avenue, Railroad Avenue and Tibbits Avenue in White Plains and construct a new station. The project was estimated to cost $200,000, with the village and state each funding one-quarter of the cost and the railroad paying the remainder of the cost. Tibbits Avenue would be put into a 24 foot (7.3 m)-wide tunnel underneath the rail line done about 810 feet (250 m) north of the existing crossing with a clearance of 12 feet (3.7 m). Railroad Avenue would be put in a 75 foot (23 m)-wide tunnel, with a 50 foot (15 m)-wide roadway and sidewalks, with a maximum clearance of 13 feet (4.0 m). An additional crossing of the rail line would be provided approximately 605 feet (184 m) to the north of Railroad Avenue.

Property values along the line increased. Other improvements were made to the Harlem Division at the same time: grade crossings were being eliminated, tracks were being straightened and new stations were built at White Plains and Mount Vernon. In March 1910, the New York Central did not yet begin work on improvements to the line at White Plains and adjacent stations, as work on improvements at West Mount Vernon were still underway. This included the filling-in of the new roadbed west of the existing station. As part of the project, a viaduct was constructed to eliminate the dangerous grade crossing in Yonkers at Railroad Avenue and Mount Vernon Avenue. A new freight station was built. As part of the project, there would be no grade along the line from White Plains to Mount Vernon. The roadbed at Hartsdale and Scarsdale would be lowered to reduce grades.

In 1910, a yard dating back to the 1870s in Dover Plains was relocated to Putnam Junction in Brewster.

On October 18, 1930, the Public Service Commission (PSC) listed the elimination of a grade crossing in Amenia, Benson crossing, as one of its projects to consider. The cost estimate for eliminating it was $100,000.

The New York Central operated the Berkshire Hills Express and several other through trains to Pittsfield and North Adams along this route to Chatham; then the NYC's Boston & Albany mainline to Pittsfield and the B&A's North Adams branch to North Adams, into the mid-1940s, with dining service.

==== 1950s and 1960s ====
In 1950, the through service to North Adams was trimmed to a shuttle from Chatham to North Adams, requiring a transfer at Chatham. Passenger service between Chatham and North Adams ended in 1953. However, the Berkshire Scenic Railway now operates a 5-mile tourist train between North Adams and Adams, Mass.

On September 11, 1952, the New York Central's next-to-last steam-powered train run in the New York City Metropolitan area ran on the Harlem Division, being replaced by diesel locomotives. However, the diesels began wearing out in the 1970s, leading to a decline in service.

The last New York City Metropolitan area New York Central steam train left Harmon for Albany and points west on August 7, 1953, behind NYC Niagara 4-8-4 #6020, after which the entire New York Central system became dieselized east of Buffalo (and east of Cleveland, Ohio the following month).

On December 20, 1956, the state opened up bids for the elimination of grade-crossings in Pleasantville. Planned for 25 years, this was expected to cost $3.857 million. The crossings to be eliminated were at Manville and Bedford Roads. The tracks were lowered for 7,000 feet (2,100 m) and the two roads were bridged over the railroad. The station at Pleasantville was moved.

On August 12, 1960, the PSC ordered the New York Central to continue the level of service to Chatham until it determined how much service was required. The Central had wanted to cut one train each way daily, leaving only one round-trip. On August 19, 1960, the Central requested permission from the PSC to reduce service between Pawling and Chatham to save $110,544.47 a year.

Starting on October 25, 1961, some trains became equipped with two-way radio communication on the Harlem Line to test the technology, with the hope of adding them to all commuter trains on the New York Central. They were meant to be used when delays in service occurred.

On January 10, 1964, the PSC approved plans by the New York Central to implement zoned fares in the southern part of the New York commutation area (north to North White Plains). The plan went into effect on January 22. Though it was meant to be experimental, and to last one year, this was kept in place.

On July 1, 1964, expanded off-peak local and express service was implemented on a pilot basis. On February 1, 1965, the New York Central began operating zone schedules for some outbound evening rush hour trains. It expanded this to some inbound morning rush hour trains to Grand Central on June 28, 1965. The implementation of zone scheduling was intended to speed trains service and reduce delays. Three additional morning inbound trains were added to facilitate the new zone schedule. Four zones were set up: Fleetwood and Mount Vernon were in Zone A, Crestwood, Tuckahoe and Bronxville were in Zone B, Hartsdale and Scarsdale were in Zone C, and White Plains-North and White Plains were in Zone D. Zone schedules operated as follows: the first train ran non-stop to Grand Central from the closest zone, Zone A. The second train would serve Zone B stops and run non-stop to Grand Central, the third would run non-stop to Grand Central after making Zone C stops, and the fourth would do the same, but for Zone D stops.

From June 28 to October 31, 1965, train 908 leaving Brewster at 7:23 a.m. and train 945 leaving Grand Central at 5:39, on a pilot basis, began running as through trains, without the need to change locomotives at White Plains-North Station using a pair of dual-power locomotives leased from the New York, New Haven and Hartford Railroad.

=== Decline under Penn Central ===
At the end of World War II, private rail service began a sharp decline with the start of the Jet Age in 1958 and the construction of the Interstate Highway System. NYC, facing declining year-over-year profits, merged in 1968 with its former rival, the Pennsylvania Railroad, forming the Penn Central Transportation Company. Penn Central continued to lose money and attempted several maneuvers to delay bankruptcy, including auctioning off the air rights of Grand Central Terminal; the Pennsylvania Railroad had done the same thing to Penn Station. However, this approval was denied, and the denial was affirmed in Penn Central Transportation Co. v. New York City, a 1978 decision by the United States Supreme Court.

In May 1970, Penn Central planned to discontinue service from Dover Plains to Chatham when Amtrak declined to take over that service. However, the New York Attorney General maintained that this service was within the commuter area, and therefore not subject to discontinuation. Without the objection, this service would have been eliminated on May 1, 1971, when Amtrak passenger service went into effect. The Interstate Commerce Commission (ICC) held hearings on this in May 1971, and it ruled on June 28, 1971, that the service to Chatham was intercity, not commuter. On that same day, a bill that would have extended the power of the Metropolitan Transportation Authority to Chatham was vetoed by Governor Nelson Rockefeller. On July 31, 1971, Penn Central announced that it would discontinue all service to Chatham the following day. The railroad claimed that it lost $300,000 a year on the one round-trip between Chatham and Grand Central.

The Attorney General appealed the ICC's ruling, and this appeal was tried in March 1972, but failed, resulting in the discontinuation of service from Dover Plains to Chatham on March 20, 1972. Penn Central operated the last southbound passenger train between Chatham and Grand Central Terminal on March 20, 1972, ending service in the middle of the day. Train 935, which was scheduled to leave Grand Central at 4:25 pm and run to Chatham was cut back to Dover Plains. With no scheduled return trip to Chatham, passengers who had gone south in the morning were left stranded, with service going only as far north as Dover Plains (52 miles shy of Chatham). Tracks were removed north of Millerton shortly thereafter. The cutback of service to Chatham was strongly opposed by the Harlem Valley Transportation Association, which was led by Lettie Gay Carson.

Prior to the discontinuation of service to Chatham, the quality of service on the line decreased. Trains that could once run the 127 miles (204 km) to Chatham in 2 hours 45 minutes now took 3 hours and 45 minutes. Service had been decreased from five trains a day to one train in each direction. As service was discontinued, a bill was put before the State Legislature that would have authorized the state to run trains to Chatham between New York and Montreal and from Albany toward Boston. The bill did not pass.

On July 2, 1973, as part of a series of service cuts, the Penn Central closed the 138th Street, Morrisania, and 183rd Street stations in the South Bronx, and Holland Avenue station in White Plains, although that one was replaced.

The Metropolitan Transportation Authority (MTA) leased the line south of Dover Plains from Penn Central on June 1, 1972. On March 28, 1980, the last freight train ran between Dover Plains and Millerton, and the line was abandoned three days later after the line's largest shipper decided to switch to using trucks. All freight service ended in 1993. Most of the remaining tracks between Wassaic and Chatham were removed and sold for scrap decades ago. Part of the track remain in the early 2000s in Chatham from the station to the intersection of Routes 203 and 66. Eventually this section of this track was removed except for a small part that points south. In 1989, New York State purchased 21 miles (34 km) of the right-of-way between Wassaic and Copake Falls for the development of the Harlem Valley Rail Trail. The segment of the line that ran from Wassaic to Craryville, New York is now under control of the Harlem Valley Rail Trail Association, which has trails between Wassaic to the former Millerton station and between Under Mountain Road and Copake Falls, known as the Harlem Valley Rail Trail. Indeed, as of 2021, the New York State Office of Parks, Recreation and Historic Preservation is working with a group of several prominent county officials and private rail-trail advocacy organizations to create a continuous 46.15-mile rail-trail all the way from Wassaic to Chatham within several years. In fact, New York State already owns a substantial portion of the requisite right-of-way.

=== Growth under Metro-North ===
==== High-level platforms ====
In April 1971, a project to install high-level platforms at stations along the Harlem Line started. This was necessary as the new Metropolitan cars did not have any stairs to reach the low-level platforms. By having high-level platforms, dwell times could be cut in half. Most of the new platforms were built as island platforms. These cars started entering into service in September 1971. At the same time, reverse signaling was installed to allow trains to use either track in either direction, enabling both tracks to be used in one direction during the peak of the rush hour. On September 10, 1974, the MTA announced that work would start on the construction of high-level platforms at eleven stations in Manhattan and the Bronx including at the Wakefield, Woodlawn, Williamsbridge, Botanical Garden, Fordham and Tremont stations on the Harlem Line. The entire project cost $2.8 million. The work was expected to be completed in the late summer of 1975. As part of the work, the stations on the Harlem Line received 340 feet (100 m)-long cast-in-place concrete platforms. The abandoned station building at Woodlawn was removed as part of the project. On March 15, 1975, these cars started stopping at the Melrose, Tremont, Fordham, Botanical Garden, Williamsbridge, Woodlawn and Wakefield stations on the Harlem Line with the partial completion of their high-level platforms. However, initially they only served the stations during weekends and early mornings and evenings on weekdays until the platform work was completed.

==== Electrification ====
The extension of electric service to Brewster had been discussed since the late 1920s. Numerous improvement studies were undertaken to evaluate the feasibility and benefits of extending electrification north from North White Plains. In 1976, the MTA undertook a study on the existing traction power system and it identified extending electric service to Brewster as a priority. In December 1978, the MTA applied to the Urban Mass Transportation Administration (UMTA) for $30 million in funding to extend electrification along the Harlem Line from North White Plains to Brewster North, which became a stop on August 3, 1981 (now known as Southeast). The MTA's application for funding was granted, with the remainder of the money coming from a New York State bond issue from 1974.

On February 8, 1980, Metro-North announced its plan to extend electrification to Brewster. On November 25, 1980, the MTA's chairman, Richard Ravitch, announced that $3 billion should be spent to expand and improve transit service. As part of the plan he proposed extending electrification to Brewster, for which planning was underway, and proposed building a third track along the Harlem Line between North White Plains and Mount Vernon West for $30 million. On February 5, 1981, UMTA approved the contract for the third rail required for the project. For an additional $45 million, high-level platforms were installed to reduce dwell times, and electric substations were built to supply the power needed for third-rail operation. The project was approved by Governor Hugh Carey after Upper Harlem Line riders and commuter organizations–dissatisfied by the line's service–petitioned for the project. Initially, the work was to be completed by the end of 1983, but due to a strike, its completion was delayed to 1984. Initially, service was provided with a mixture of new and old electric cars, but these were replaced by the new M3As. Work on the project was completed during off-peak hours to allow for service on the line to be maintained. Thirteen of the stations received new high-level center island platforms. Mount Pleasant station got side platforms, while the station at Thornwood was closed because of excessive curvature of the track, which would have resulted in a large gap between the train and the platform. The new stations received glass-enclosed overpasses and elevators.

The first electric train ran on April 30, 1984, beginning at Brewster North. As additional new M3As were put into service that spring, electric service increased. On September 1, 1984, a new schedule was put out, and running times decreased by 18 minutes on peak hour trains. On September 10, 1984, super express service was inaugurated on the Harlem Line, with some trains running non-stop between Katonah and Grand Central. The last diesel train left Brewster on November 2, 1984, marking the completion of the electrification project.

As a result of the project, there was tremendous ridership growth on this portion of the line. Prior to the project, the line was operated primarily in two zones: electric service south of North White Plains, and diesel through-service or shuttle service consisting of Budd Rail Diesel Cars to the north. Service to the north of Brewster North–the new terminal for electric service–continued to be run with diesel through-service or shuttle service. Between 1984 and 1994, the Brewster and Brewster North stations– the two northernmost stations in the electrified zone–experienced 135 percent growth, and stations on the Dover Plains Branch experienced 440% growth.

On April 14, 1986, the MTA released a study on the future of the non-electrified section of the Harlem Line between Brewster North and Dover Plains. According to the study, maintaining service would require major improvements to the four stations on this line segment, including new lighting, canopies, and platforms, and improved waiting areas. Five options were considered in the study: rebuilding the kind of train cars already used on the line, reassigning self-propelled cars from other lines, which would receive new rolling stock, purchasing rail buses-motorized vehicles that run on track, replacing trains with buses to Brewster North, and discontinuing service. A public hearing was scheduled to take place on the study on June 7, 1986. In June 1986, MTA and Metro-North officials said it was unlikely that service would be discontinued. At the time, about 70 percent of riders along this section of the line drove to Brewster North, which had more frequent service. In addition, about 100 riders traveled southbound from the four stations on any given weekday. It was estimated that over $700,000 a year could be saved by replacing trains with buses. A decision on service north of Brewster North was expected within six months by two MTA Board members.

On February 26, 1988, the MTA board approved plans to close Melrose station. A spokesman for Metro-North said that the station was being "land banked" and was being boarded up, allowing it to be reopened if ridership increased. The decision was strongly opposed by Bronx Borough President Fernando Ferrer, who said that the agency created a self-fulfilling prophecy by failing to promote the station and by not maintaining it. Service at the station was very infrequent, and as a result local residents did not consider using it. On March 30, 1988, two days before the planned closure of the station on April 1, Ferrer held a press conference with other Bronx political leaders outside the station protesting the MTA's decision. Ferrer led a tour of the station, showing its use by drug addicts, and its state of disrepair. He said that Metro-North should be working to improve the station and better market the service instead of closing it. At the time, workers were sinking cement posts to board up the station in preparation for its closing. Metro-North planned to close the station on April 1, 1988, but delayed it by ninety days at the request of Bronx officials. Melrose was removed from the April 3, 1988 timetable in anticipation of its closing but was reinstated on the June 19, 1988 timetable as the station never did close. On August 16, 1989, Metro-North announced that it had dropped plans to close the station. The station had been kept open, cleaned up, and the issue was reviewed at the request of Ferrer.

==== Upper Harlem improvements ====
The introduction of new coaches allowed for improvements in service on the Dover Plains Branch. The first peak through service since the 1970s was inaugurated in October 1991. At the same time, a Sunday night through train was added. The reduced travel times made the line more attractive to commuters. In 1994, Metro-North conducted a train movement analysis of service on the branch to determine whether trains would pass one another based on speeds and the condition of tracks. As a result, a new 1,000 feet (0.30 km) passing siding was constructed at Wingdale, increasing service flexibility and allowing for increased service in 1996. Also around this time, 447 additional parking spaces were added to stations on the Branch. In 1996, four car-length high-level platforms with heated shelters were built at Patterson, Pawling, Harlem Valley–Wingdale and Dover Plains, replacing low-level platforms that could only accommodate two cars. These platforms were made to be compliant with the Americans with Disabilities Act of 1990. Travel times could be reduced further as it would take less time for passengers to exit and board the trains.

A new station, Appalachian Trail, was built in 1990 for the cost of $10,000. Its creation was the suggestion of George Zoebelein, who was an avid hiker and a veteran of the NY/NJ Trail Conference as well as both the NY/NJ Appalachian Trail Conferences, and also served as a member of the Metro-North Railroad Commuter Council (MNRCC) of the Permanent Citizens Advisory Committee (PCAC) to the Metropolitan Transportation Authority. It is one of three limited service stops operated by Metro-North primarily for hikers – the other two being Breakneck Ridge and Manitou on the Hudson Line. This is the only rail station on the 2,144 miles (3,450 km)-long trail.

On December 9, 1992, the ICC authorized Conrail to convey its freight rights on the Harlem Line north of North White Plains to the Danbury Terminal Railway Company (DTRC). In 1995, the ICC directed the DTRC to discontinue freight operations on the line, as it had not been used for freight service in several years.

==== Restoration of service to Wassaic ====
In 1993, Metro-North announced plans to restore service north of Dover Plains to Wassaic. Initially, the project was estimated to cost $12.8 million. The extension was intended to help revive the community of Wassaic, and to turn it into a hub where passengers would come from Litchfield County in Connecticut, the Berkshires in Massachusetts, and from Vermont.

On October 19, 1995, the town of Amenia passed a resolution supporting the Harlem Line's extension by 6 miles (9.7 km) to Wassaic.

On January 23, 1997, Metro-North acquired the property necessary for the extension of service on the Upper Harlem Division to Wassaic. In August 1997, the Final Environmental Impact Study for the Wassaic extension was completed, recommending that the preferred option, the extension of service to Wassaic, be completed. One of the rejected alternatives was the restoration of service to Millerton and Mount Riga in Dutchess County. A layover yard would have also been built as part of this alternative. This alternative was rejected due to the presence of the Harlem Valley Rail Trail, and replacing it with rail service would have required an in-kind replacement of any taking of parkland. Since a majority of the line was not owned by Metro-North, it was viewed as being cost-prohibitive. In July 1998, Metro-North announced the names for the new stations on the extension: Tenmile River and Wassaic.

In 1998, it was announced that platforms at eight stations on the Harlem Line would be extended as part of $73 million in station improvements. Platforms at Hawthorne, Pleasantville, Mount Kisco, Bedford Hills, Katonah, and Goldens Bridge would be extended two cars. This work was not expected to begin until 2000. In addition, work would be done at Mount Vernon West to eliminate a gap between a canopy and the top of the stairs, to design the rehabilitation of overpasses at Hartsdale, Scarsdale, Crestwood, and Tuckahoe, to rehabilitate an underpass at North White Plains, to repair a platform and fencing at Chappaqua, to replace an asphalt path to an elevator at Crestwood, to rehabilitate an overpass at Pleasantville, to design a new overpass at Goldens Bridge, and to repair stairs and an elevator shaft at Valhalla. Additional projects would ensure canopies, windows, and other elements were in good shape at Brewster, Croton Falls, and Purdy's, would move a police substation into a building and move a ticket office to a more convenient location at White Plains, and design work for a platform extension, a new overpass, and potentially new track at Brewster North. Work to rehabilitate a station building at Bronxville was 90 percent complete at the time. Additional projects were planned on the Hudson and New Haven Lines. Some stations would receive the first major work done in 15 to 20 years.

In April 1999, the MTA put out bids to purchase signal equipment to go along 28 miles (45 km) of the line from Brewster to Wassaic. The signal system was bi-directional with cab signaling.

On July 9, 2000, Metro-North restored service between Dover Plains and Wassaic, a move the railroad billed as its first service expansion since it was created in 1983. As part of the project, the trailhead of the Harlem Valley Rail Trail was moved from milepoint 81.6 to milepoint 82. 6,152 feet (1,875 m) of right-of-way had to be acquired from the New York State Office of Parks, Recreation, and Historical Preservation. To make up for this loss, $490,800 was received by the Transportation Enhancement Program to design and construct an access pathway from Wassaic station to the new trailhead. Wassaic was designed as and is a regional transportation hub for people living and going to Dutchess County in New York, Litchfield County in Connecticut and for Western Massachusetts. The station was built with a 250-space parking lot that, with expansion, could have 1000 parking spaces, and with a layover yard, and a light maintenance facility. One of the goals of the expansion was to provide additional parking capacity for the line. Prior to the opening of the yard at Wassaic, trains terminating at Dover Plains had to deadhead 23 miles to get to the yard at Southeast, reducing capacity on the line, while being very costly. A station was also opened at Tenmile River to serve the Taconic Developmental Disabilities Service Office. Under an alternative plan, this would have been the terminus of the line. To build ridership, the extension has received the same amount of service as has the line south of Dover Plains, with four AM and four PM rush hour trains with direct service to Grand Central. In fact, since 1984, weekday ridership on trains to Dover Plains increased by 463 percent to a total of 535 people riding south daily. The extension cost $6 million. The extension also eased the commutes of people coming from Massachusetts.

In the early 2000s, through 2002, Metro-North completed its Upper Harlem Station Improvement Project. As part of the project, stations from Valhalla to Brewster had their platforms extended, received modified elevators, repairs to their roofs, canopies and platforms, improvements to their entrances, the replacement of windows and improved platform lighting. On April 1, 2001, work began on several projects to improve the line's right-of-way, including the replacement of the bridge that carries the Harlem Line over the Bronx River north of Woodlawn station and the extension of platforms at Purdy's and Goldens Bridge to fit eight-car trains.

==== Mid-Harlem third track project ====
Early in 1994, Metro-North announced plans to build a third track along 2.5 miles (4.0 km) of the Harlem Line between Mount Vernon West and Crestwood to increase capacity and to eliminate a bottleneck. At the time, Harlem Line ridership was growing, with an expected 31 million people using the line in 2020. Without the construction of an additional track, only one southbound peak-hour train could have been added without cutting local service, express service or reverse peak service. In August 2001, construction on the $57 million project began. The project was completed in 2004. The Fleetwood and Crestwood stations were expanded through the adding of island platforms to allow for the third track to stop there. The right-of-way was wide enough to fit the third track, requiring no taking of property. The plan for the installation of a third track was first conceived in 1989, but it was faced with strong community opposition due to concerns over noise and vibrations. Once opened, the third track resulted in improved service. Reverse-peak trains were able to run every 30 minutes instead of every 90 minutes, helping fuel a 30 percent increase in ridership along the line through Southern Westchester and the Bronx. Most of the new reverse-peak users came from the Bronx. The increased service helped revitalize White Plains' downtown, helping anchor the economy of central Westchester. Express trains could skip stops via the express track while additional local trains could make stops in Westchester and the Bronx.

=== Purchase by the MTA ===
On November 13, 2018, the MTA announced its intent to purchase the Hudson and Harlem Lines as well as the Grand Central Terminal for up to $35.065 million, plus a discount rate of 6.25%. The purchase would include all inventory, operations, improvements, and maintenance associated with each asset, except for the air rights over Grand Central. At the time, the Hudson and Harlem Lines were owned by a holding company that had taken possession of Penn Central's assets upon its bankruptcy, while the Grand Central Terminal was owned by Midtown TDR Ventures. Under the terms of the leases for each asset, the MTA would only be able to exercise an option to purchase the three assets before October 2019. The MTA's finance committee approved the proposed purchase on November 13, 2018, and the purchase was approved by the full board two days later. The deal finally closed in March 2020, with the MTA taking ownership of the terminal and rail lines.

Following this purchase, the MTA has owned the entirety of the Harlem Line. The agency had previously acquired the segment north of Dover Plains in 1990 when Harlem Line service was extended on this trackage.

=== Incidents ===
On February 3, 2015, a Harlem line train struck a car on the tracks near Valhalla and caught fire, killing six people.

== Future ==
With the entire existing track in use (since service to Wassaic was restored in 2000), there is little talk of expansion or branching. However, Metro-North will revisit a future extension northward if circumstances change. When plans were drawn up for extending the line northward from Dover Plains, the goal for Metro-North was to extend the line as far north as possible for a new yard, and to attract the most new passengers. Wassaic was the best site, and service was not extended to Millerton as the Harlem Valley Rail Trail was using the right-of-way. This directly contrasts one of the main purposes of rail trails: to preserve the right-of-way to allow for rail service to be restored in the future.

In the 2015–2034 MTA Twenty-Year Capital Needs Assessment, two possible Harlem Line projects that would provide capacity to deal with increasing ridership and to expand service are mentioned. The first is the extension of a third track from Crestwood north to North White Plains. This would allow for increased reverse-peak service, increased local and express service-the same goals of the original third track project from Mount Vernon West to Crestwood. The second project would be the construction of a new flyover at Woodlawn at the junction with the New Haven Line. However, funding for these projects has not been identified as there are ongoing needs to maintain basic infrastructure.

== Branches ==
The Harlem Line currently has no operational branches. Under New York Central ownership, it previously operated a 7.22 mi (11.62 km) branch to Lake Mahopac to a connection with the Putnam Division. This line was originally a subsidiary known as the New York and Mahopac Railroad (1871–1880), and had one station between the two lines in Lincolndale. The line opened on June 17, 1872, and it extended to Golden's Bridge. It cost $266,000 to build it. After the discontinuance of passenger service on the Putnam Division in 1958, the Central operated a shuttle service known as "around the horn" which continued on Putnam Division trackage north of Lake Mahopac to Mahopac, Carmel, and Brewster where it reconnected with the Harlem Division main line. This service lasted until 1959. The only active remnant of this branch is a wye north of Brewster station known as Putnam Junction. There are some remains of the right-of-way of the branch, including Bridge L-158, a Whipple truss just west of the Golden's Bridge station, which is listed on the National Register of Historic Places.

North of Brewster is a connection with Metro-North's Beacon Line, which was purchased by Metro-North in 1995 for preservation for future use. There are currently no plans for branch service on this line, which runs north and west to Hopewell Junction, and then south and west to Beacon. It also runs east to Danbury, Connecticut, but a reverse move would be required. In October 2000, Metro-North undertook a study to determine whether it was feasible to restore passenger service to the line between Hopewell Junction and Brewster. Service, if operated, during peak hours, would have run directly to Grand Central, while they would have run as a shuttle during other times, ending at Southeast. The introduction of the line would have reduced ridership on the Wassaic Branch by 20%. Two shuttles would have run exclusively on the Beacon Line, while three Upper Harlem Line trains would have been extended from Southeast to Hopewell Junction. The study determined that at the time it did not make sense to restore service on the line. On February 26, 2021, Metro-North announced it would file with the Surface Transportation Board to deactivate the Beacon Line, rendering it abandoned.

=== Port Morris Branch ===
The freight-only Port Morris Branch split from the Harlem Line within the South Bronx in the southbound direction. The Port Morris branch was part of a line which was originally part of the Spuyten Duyvil and Port Morris Railroad which was established in 1842. The railroad was bought by the New York and Harlem Railroad in 1853, and the segment north of Mott Haven Junction became part of the NYC Hudson Division. The Port Morris Branch began at a wye north of Melrose Station, then extended southeast through The Hub, through a tunnel under St. Mary's Park, and finally Port Morris along the East River just after crossing a bridge beneath the Harlem River and Port Chester Branch of the New York, New Haven and Hartford Railroad. The only two stations along this branch were at Westchester Avenue between Brook and St Mary's Avenues and at Port Morris itself across the river from North Brother Island. After the construction of the Oak Point Link at the Bronx's southern tip and its subsequent opening in 1998, trains stopped operating along the Port Morris Branch in 1999. Formal abandonment was declared in 2003, when CSX Transportation declared that the branch could be vacated due to the lack of use in the preceding two years.

== Rolling stock ==
On the electrified portions of the line, M3As and M7As are usually used. As with the Hudson Line, diesel-powered trains are operated by dual-mode Genesis and BL20-GH locomotives, paired with Shoreliner coaches. Except for two rush hour trains in the peak direction that operate directly to and from Grand Central Terminal, most Harlem Line diesel-only territory is operated as shuttle service between Southeast (where electrification ends) and Wassaic, 29 miles (47 km) north in Dutchess County.

== Stations ==
| Zone | Location | Station | Miles (km) | Date opened | Date closed | Connections/notes |
|---|---|---|---|---|---|---|
| 1 | Manhattan | Grand Central Terminal | 0.0 (0) | October 6, 1871 | | Metro-North Railroad: ■ Hudson Line, ■ New Haven Line; Long Island Rail Road: ■ Babylon Branch, ■ Far Rockaway Branch, ■ Hempstead Branch, ■ Long Beach Branch, ■ Port Jefferson Branch, ■ Port Washington Branch, ■ Ronkonkoma Branch, ■ West Hempstead Branch (at Grand Central Madison); NYC Subway: MTA Bus, NYCT Bus |
| 1 | Manhattan | 59th Street | | | | Built during the late 1870s, although trains never stopped here. |
| 1 | Manhattan | 72nd Street | | | June 23, 1901 | |
| 1 | Manhattan | 86th Street | 2.2 (3.5) | May 15, 1876 | June 23, 1901 | |
| 1 | Manhattan | 110th Street | 3.4 (5.5) | May 15, 1876 | June 17, 1906 | |
| 1 | Manhattan | Harlem–125th Street | 4.2 (6.8) | October 25, 1897 | | Metro-North Railroad: ■ Hudson Line, ■ New Haven Line; NYC Subway: (at 125th Street); NYCT Bus |
| 2 | The Bronx | | | | | |
| 2 | The Bronx | 138th Street | 5.0 (8.0) | c. 1858 | July 2, 1973 | |
| 2 | The Bronx | Melrose | 6.1 (9.8) | c. 1890 | | NYCT Bus |
| 2 | The Bronx | Morrisania | 6.7 (10.8) | c. 1858 | July 2, 1973 | |
| 2 | The Bronx | Claremont Park | | | c. 1960 | |
| 2 | The Bronx | Tremont | 7.8 (12.6) | c. 1890 | | NYCT Bus |
| 2 | The Bronx | 183rd Street | 8.5 (13.7) | | July 2, 1973 | |
| 2 | The Bronx | Fordham | 8.9 (14.3) | March 1, 1841 | | Metro-North Railroad: ■ New Haven Line; NYCT Bus, MTA Bus, Bee-Line Bus |
| 2 | The Bronx | Botanical Garden | 9.5 (15.3) | c. 1893 | | NYCT Bus |
| 2 | The Bronx | Williams Bridge | 10.5 (16.9) | September 3, 1842 | | NYC Subway: (at Gun Hill Road); NYCT Bus, MTA Bus |
| 2 | The Bronx | Woodlawn | 11.8 (19.0) | 1848 | | NYC Subway: (at 233rd Street); NYCT Bus, MTA Bus, Bee-Line Bus |
| 2 | The Bronx | Wakefield | 12.6 (20.3) | | | NYC Subway: (at Wakefield–241st Street); NYCT Bus, MTA Bus, Bee-Line Bus |
| 3 | Mount Vernon | Mount Vernon West | 13.1 (21.1) | 1914 | | Bee-Line Bus |
| 3 | Mount Vernon | Fleetwood | 14.3 (23.0) | October 25, 1924 | | Bee-Line Bus |
| 3 | Bronxville | Bronxville | 15.3 (24.6) | 1916 | | Bee-Line Bus |
| 3 | Tuckahoe | Tuckahoe | 16.0 (25.7) | July 2, 1844 | | Bee-Line Bus |
| 3 | Tuckahoe | Crestwood | 16.8 (27.0) | 1901 | | |
| 4 | Scarsdale | Scarsdale | 18.9 (30.4) | December 1, 1844 | | Bee Line Bus |
| 4 | Greenburgh | Hartsdale | 20.6 (33.2) | December 1, 1844 | | Bee Line Bus |
| 4 | White Plains | White Plains | 22.4 (36.0) | December 1, 1844 | | Bee Line Bus, CTtransit Stamford, Transport of Rockland |
| 4 | White Plains | Holland Avenue | 24.0 (38.6) | | December 21, 1971 | Formerly used to switch between electric and diesel locomotives |
| 4 | White Plains | North White Plains | 24.0 (38.6) | 1972 | | Bee-Line Bus |
| 5 | Mount Pleasant | Valhalla | 25.4 (40.9) | 1846 | | Bee-Line Bus |
| 5 | Mount Pleasant | Kensico Cemetery | 26.4 (42.5) | December 1891 | 1983 | |
| 5 | Mount Pleasant | Mount Pleasant | 27.2 (43.8) | | | Limited service stop |
| 5 | Mount Pleasant | Hawthorne | 28.2 (45.4) | 1847 | | Bee-Line Bus |
| 5 | Mount Pleasant | Thornwood | 29.4 (47.3) | c. 1891 | March 5, 1984 | |
| 5 | Pleasantville | Pleasantville | 30.5 (49.1) | October 1846 | | Bee-Line Bus |
| 5 | New Castle | Chappaqua | 32.4 (52.1) | 1902 | | Bee-Line Bus |
| 6 | Mount Kisco | Mount Kisco | 36.7 (59.1) | c. 1858 | | Bee-Line Bus; Terminal for select peak trains |
| 6 | Bedford | Bedford Hills | 39.1 (62.9) | | | Bee-Line Bus: 19 |
| 6 | Bedford | Katonah | 41.1 (66.1) | June 1, 1847 | | Bee-Line Bus, HARTransit |
| 6 | Lewisboro | Goldens Bridge | 43.6 (70.2) | | | |
| 7 | North Salem | Purdy's | 46.1 (74.2) | | | |
| 7 | North Salem | Croton Falls | 47.8 (76.9) | June 1, 1847 | | Short Line Bus |
| 7 | Brewster | Brewster | 52.0 (83.7) | December 31, 1848 | | HARTransit, Putnam Transit |
| 7 | Southeast | Southeast | 53.2 (85.6) | | | HARTransit; Northern terminus of electrification |
| 7 | Southeast | Dykeman's | 54.7 (88.0) | December 31, 1848 | c. 1968 | |
| 7 | Patterson | | | | | |
| 7 | Patterson | Towner's | 57.9 (93.2) | December 31, 1848 | c. 1968 | |
| 8 | Patterson | Patterson | 60.2 (96.9) | December 31, 1848 | | Putnam Transit |
| 8 | Village of Pawling | Pawling | 63.8 (102.7) | December 31, 1848 | | Dutchess County LOOP |
| 8 | Town of Pawling | Appalachian Trail | 65.9 (106.1) | April 1, 1990 | | Limited service stop |
| 9 | Dover | Harlem Valley–Wingdale | 69.0 (111.0) | c. 1930's | | |
| 9 | Dover | Wingdale | 69.8 (112.3) | December 31, 1848 | October 30, 1977 | |
| 9 | Dover | Dover Furnace | 72.5 (116.7) | December 31, 1848 | c. 1968 | |
| 9 | Dover | Dover Plains | 76.5 (123.1) | December 31, 1848 | | Dutchess County LOOP |
| 10 | Amenia | Tenmile River | 80.0 (128.7) | July 9, 2000 | | Dutchess County LOOP |
| 10 | Amenia | Wassaic | 82.0 (132.0) | May 10, 1852 July 9, 2000 | March 20, 1972 | |
| | Amenia | Amenia | 85.0 (136.8) | May 10, 1852 | March 20, 1972 | |
| | Amenia | Sharon | 87.8 (141.3) | 1873 | | |
| | North East | Coleman's | 89.0 (143.2) | 1851 | | |
| | Millerton | Millerton | 92.7 (149.2) | May 10, 1852 | March 20, 1972 | |
| | North East | Mount Riga | 95.9 (154.3) | May 10, 1852 | | |
| | Ancram | Boston Corners | 99.8 (160.6) | | | |
| | Copake | Copake Falls | 104.8 (168.7) | | March 20, 1972 | |
| | Hillsdale | Hillsdale | 108.9 (175.3) | | March 20, 1972 | |
| | Copake | Craryville | 111.7 (179.8) | May 10, 1852 | March 20, 1972 | |
| | Hillsdale | Martindale | 115.5 (185.9) | May 10, 1852 | | |
| | Philmont | Philmont | 118.9 (191.4) | May 10, 1852 | March 20, 1972 | |
| | Ghent | Ghent | 124.9 (201.0) | May 10, 1852 | | Junction with Boston and Albany Railroad Hudson Branch |
| | Chatham | Union Station | 127.5 (205.2) | December 21, 1841 May 10, 1852 | March 20, 1972 | Junction with Boston and Albany Railroad Main Line and Rutland Railroad |

=== Lake Mahopac Branch ===
Built by the New York and Mahopac Railroad in 1871, the Lake Mahopac Branch diverges from the Harlem Line north of Goldens Bridge and merged with the now-defunct Putnam Division south of Mahopac. Known to some residents of Mahopac as the "Golden’s Bridge Branch". The entire branch was abandoned on April 2, 1959.

| Station | Miles (km) from GCT | Date opened | Date closed | Connections / notes |
|---|---|---|---|---|
| Goldens Bridge | 43.6 (70.2) | | April 2, 1959 | Connection to the Harlem Division |
| Lincolndale | | | April 2, 1959 | |
| Shenorock | | | Prior to April 2, 1959 | |
| Lake Mahopac | | | April 2, 1959 | |

=== Port Morris Branch ===
The entire line was used exclusively for freight. It diverged from the Harlem Line at Melrose and terminated at Port Morris, east of the Oak Point Yard. The line was formally abandoned in 2004.

| Station | Miles (km) from GCT | Date opened | Date closed | Connections / notes |
|---|---|---|---|---|
| Melrose | 6.1 (9.8) | c. 1890 | | NYCT Bus |
| Westchester Avenue | | | | |
| Port Morris | | | | |
