= 138th Street station (New York Central Railroad) =

Railroad station in The Bronx, New York City (closed 1973)

138th Street
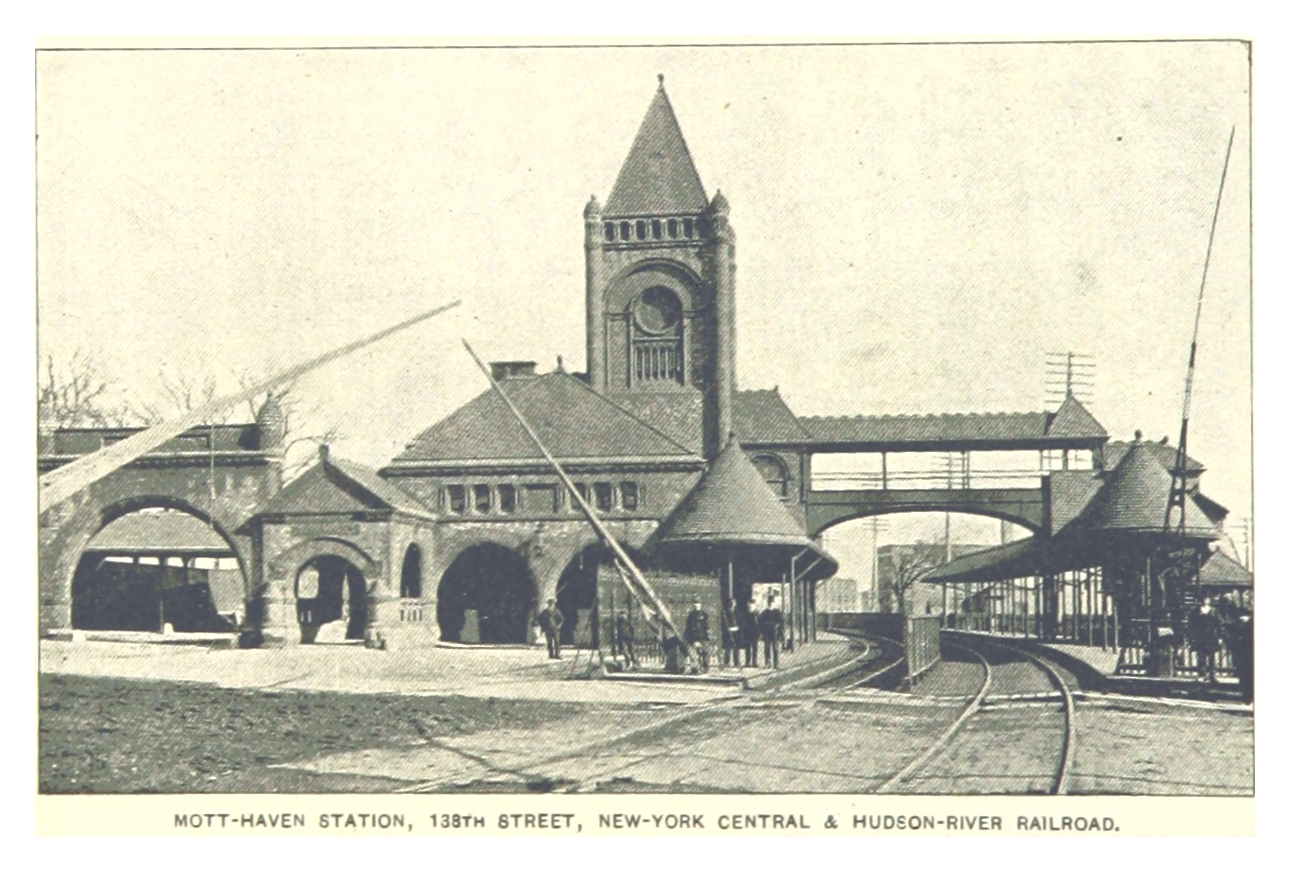
- An 1893 photo of the 138th Street station from The King's Handbook of New York City.

General information
- Location: Park Avenue and 138th Street; Mott Haven, The Bronx, New York
- Coordinates: 40.813°N 73.930°W
- Owner: New York Central Railroad
- Line: Park Avenue main line (Hudson Line)
- Platforms: 2 island platforms
- Tracks: 4
- Connections: New York City Subway: trains at Mott Haven Avenue; NYCT Bus: Bx1, Bx33

History
- Opened: c. 1850
- Closed: July 2, 1973; 53 years ago
- Rebuilt: 1886 (140 years ago), 1897 (129 years ago), 1966 (60 years ago)
- Electrified: 700V (DC) third rail
- Former names: Mott Haven; The Bronx

Former services
Preceding station	New York Central Railroad	Following station
Yonkers toward Chicago	Main Line	125th Street toward New York
High Bridge toward Peekskill	Hudson Division	125th Street toward New York
Melrose toward Chatham	Harlem Division	125th Street toward New York
Location

The 138th Street station was a station on the Harlem and Hudson Lines of the New York Central Railroad, serving the community of Mott Haven in the Bronx, New York City. It was the southernmost station along both branches until 1973. The New York, New Haven and Hartford Railroad also ran through this station but did not stop here.

== History ==
The New York and Harlem Railroad expanded their main line across the Harlem River through Mott Haven into Williams Bridge from Park Avenue Bridge (New York City), a bridge built in 1841. This bridge would be replaced in 1867, 1897, and 1956. A station named Mott Haven was known to exist as far back as at least 1850, the same year a post office was established in the neighborhood. The station was rebuilt in a much more elaborate fashion in 1886, with the construction of a Richardson Romanesque structure designed by Robert Henderson Robertson, and was hailed as "the finest and most complete way station in the country". Originally at street level, the tracks were later raised above ground level as part of a grade elimination project in order to accommodate the 1897 version of the Park Avenue Bridge. A major grade elimination project in the Bronx north of the station also took place between 1888 and 1890.

Throughout most of the station's existence, it has been in relatively close proximity to mass transit. In 1887, the Suburban Rapid Transit Company built a station along the Third Avenue Elevated several blocks to the east. By 1918, its successor, the Interborough Rapid Transit Company expanded the IRT Jerome Avenue Line south from 149th Street to the Lexington Avenue Tunnel into the IRT Lexington Avenue Line in Harlem, and built a subway station beneath the vicinity of the railroad station. The subway station still exists.

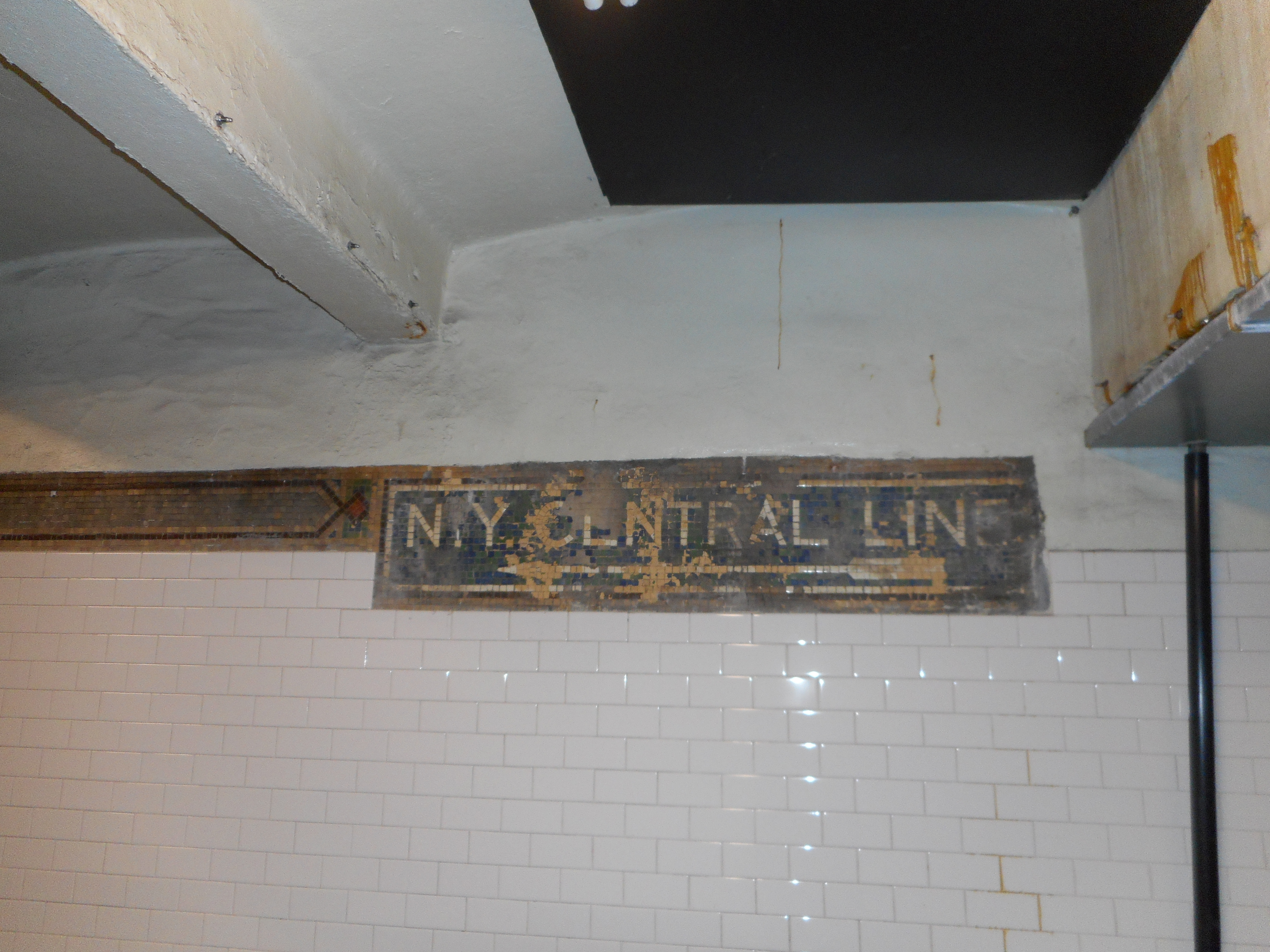
Tile mosaics at 149th Street–Hostos station referencing the never built New York Central Railroad station

During the Great Depression, New York Central had proposed to build a new station in Mott Haven eleven blocks to the north at 149th Street, just south of Mott Haven Junction. Mosaics at the 149th Street–Grand Concourse subway station complex (now known as 149th Street–Hostos) direct commuters to this proposed station which was never built. Only the tunnel to the station was built and was closed by the New York City Transit Authority.

Declining ridership following World War II, along with the decline of the South Bronx led to the demolition of the previous structure in 1966, and the replacement with little more than sheltered platforms. As with other New York Central Railroad stations in the Bronx, 138th Street became a Penn Central station once the New York Central and Pennsylvania Railroads merged in 1968. Penn Central acquired the New Haven Railroad in 1969, but the New Haven still never stopped there. However, because of the railroad's serious financial distress following the merger, commuter service was turned over to the Metropolitan Transportation Authority in 1972. The station was closed by Penn Central on July 2, 1973, along with Morrisania, and 183rd Street stations in the South Bronx. The site of the station is today a location of a local community garden.
