= Dover Furnace station =

Dover Furnace
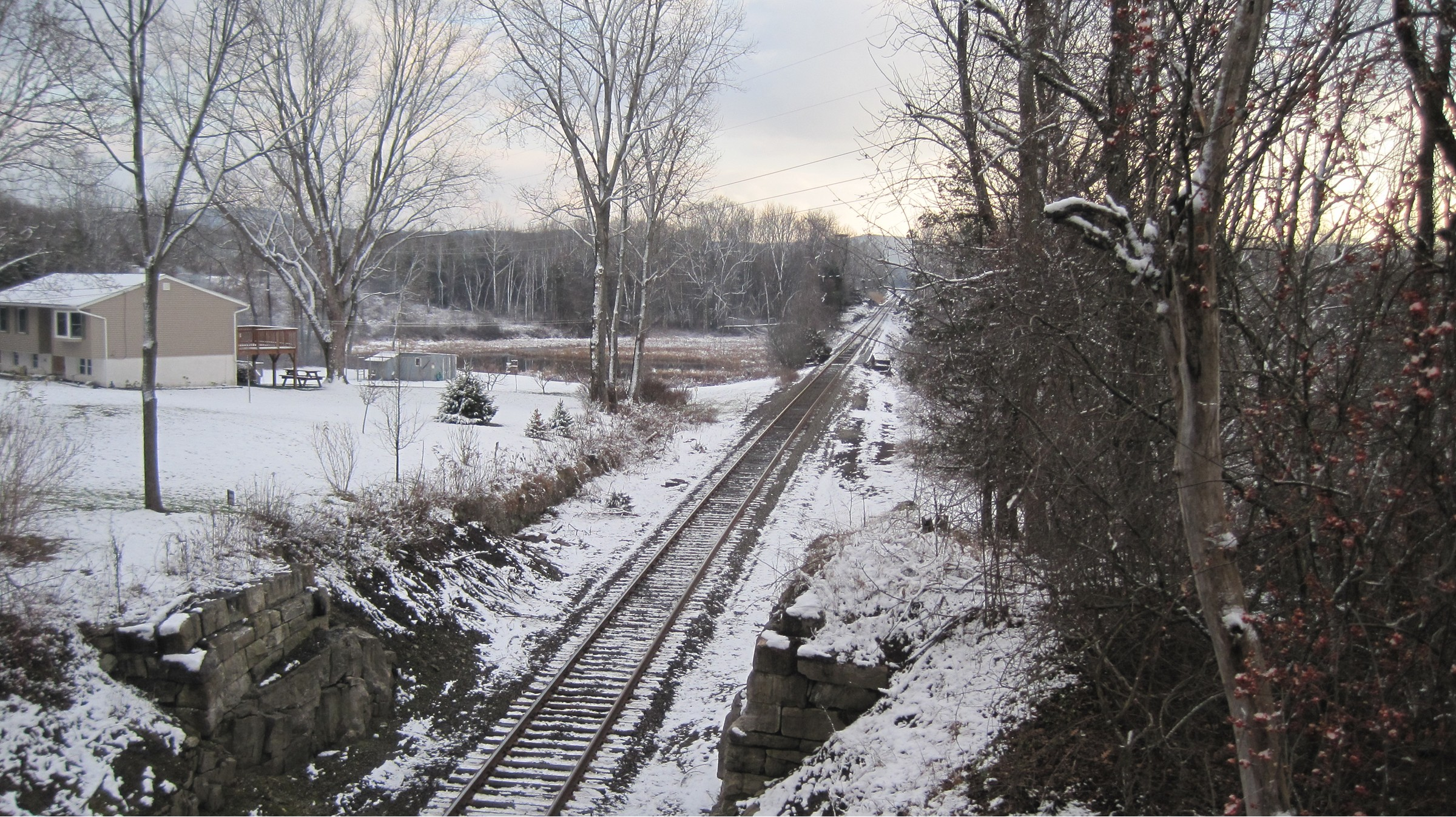
- Location of the former Dover Furnace station

General information
- Location: 97-115 Dover Furnace Road (Dutchess CR 26); Dover Plains, New York
- Coordinates: 41.6836°N 73.5839°W
- Tracks: 1

History
- Opened: December 31, 1848

Former services
Preceding station	New York Central Railroad	Following station
State Hospital toward New York	Harlem Division	Dover Plains toward Chatham
Location

Dover Furnace was a station on the Harlem Line of the New York Central Railroad (now Metro-North Railroad). It was 72 miles (116 km) north from Grand Central Terminal in New York City. The station was located across from a freight house owned by a dairy company, and was closed at some point between 1959 and 1968. No station structures remain at the site.

The site of the former Dover Furnace station can be found on the south side of a one lane bridge over the tracks, which carries Dutchess County Route 26.
