= Melrose station =

Metro-North Railroad station in the Bronx, New York

Melrose
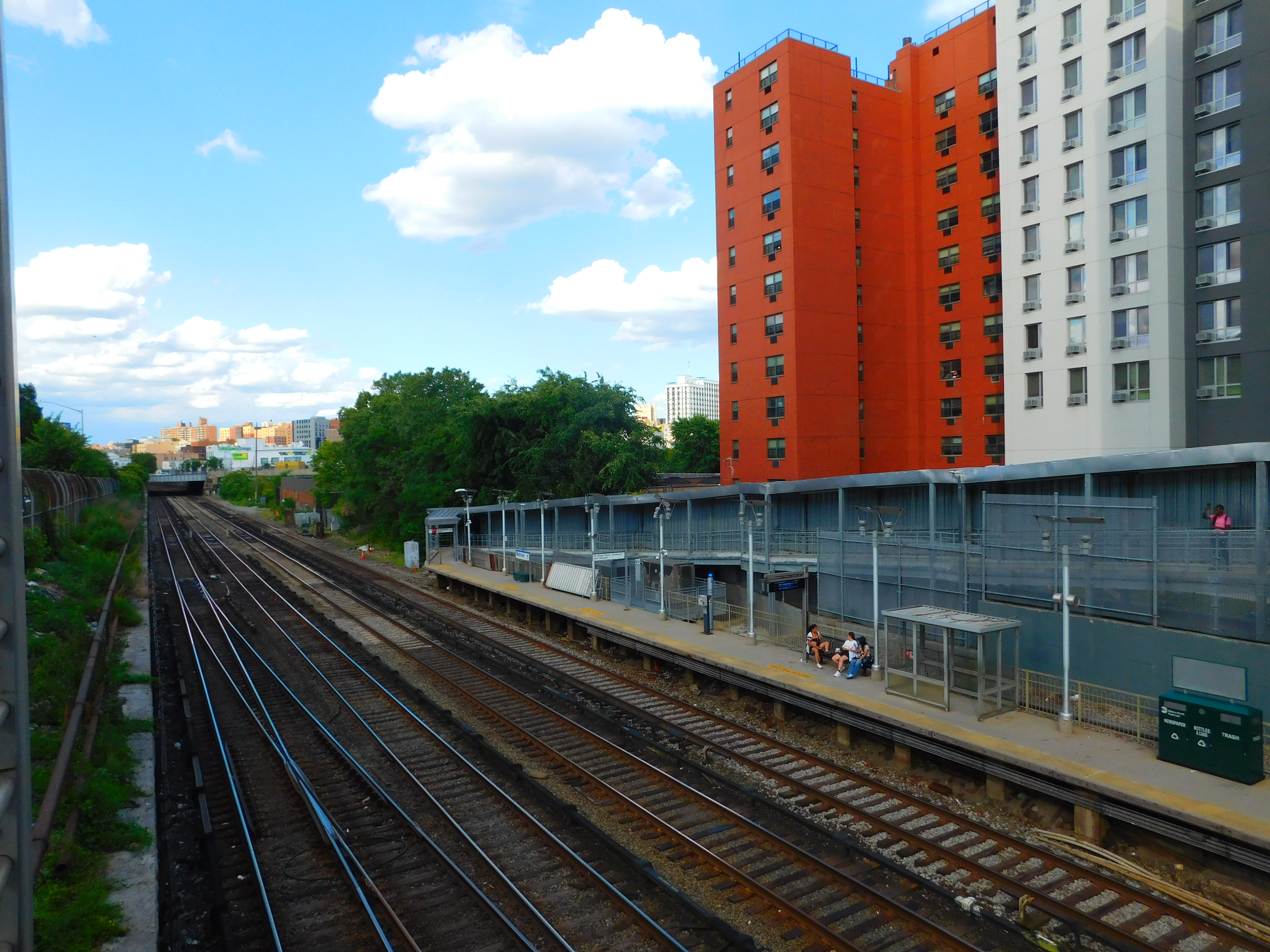
- The outbound platform at Melrose station in June 2026.

General information
- Location: 3231 Park Avenue; Melrose, Bronx, New York
- Coordinates: 40.8257°N 73.9154°W
- Line: Harlem Line
- Platforms: 2 side platforms
- Tracks: 4
- Connections: New York City Bus: Bx6, Bx6 SBS, Bx13, Bx32, Bx41, Bx41 SBS

Construction
- Accessible: Northbound platform only

Other information
- Fare zone: 2

History
- Opened: c. 1841
- Electrified: 700V (DC) third rail

Passengers
- 2018: 311 (Metro-North)
- Rank: 84 of 109

Services
Preceding station	Metro-North Railroad	Following station
Harlem–125th Street toward Grand Central	Harlem Line	Tremont toward North White Plains
New Haven Line does not stop here
Former services
Preceding station	New York Central Railroad	Following station
138th Street toward New York	Harlem Division	Morrisania toward Chatham
Location

Melrose station (also known as Melrose–East 162nd Street station) is a commuter rail stop on the Metro-North Railroad's Harlem Line, located in the Melrose neighborhood of the Bronx, New York City. It is located in an open cut beneath Park Avenue at its intersection with East 162nd Street. It is close to the nearby Bronx neighborhoods of Concourse and Morrisania. Since a major service increase that began as a pilot program in October 2016 and was made permanent in October 2017, train service at Melrose is similar in frequency to most Harlem Line stations, with trains stopping approximately every half-hour during rush hours and every hour all other times.

In 2023, the northbound platform was made accessible in accordance with the Americans with Disabilities Act thanks to the construction of a ramp that leads from East 162nd Street to the north end of the platform.

== History ==
=== Original station ===
A station along the New York and Harlem Railroad in Melrose was known to exist as far back as 1841. When Melrose station was rebuilt by the New York Central Railroad (NYC) in the late 19th century, it contained a station house as a bridge over all four tracks, with two island platforms. Similar structures were built for the former Morrisania Station, as well as Tremont Station.

=== Planned closure ===
As with other NYC stations in the Bronx, the station became a Penn Central station once the NYC and Pennsylvania Railroads merged in 1968. However, because of the railroad's serious financial distress following the merger, commuter service was turned over to the Metropolitan Transportation Authority in 1972. Penn Central was acquired by Conrail in 1976, and the line and station were completely turned over to Metro-North Railroad on January 1, 1983.

In 1988, the station was nearly closed due to the station's low daily ridership of 20 riders in the morning and 20 in the evening, and the adjacent Tremont station would have been closed on weekends. On February 26, 1988, the MTA board approved plans to close the station. A spokesman for Metro-North said that the station was being "land banked" and was being boarded up, allowing it to be reopened if ridership increased. The decision was strongly opposed by Bronx Borough President Fernando Ferrer, who said that the agency created a self-fulfilling prophecy by failing to promote the station and by not maintaining it. Service at the station was very infrequent, and as a result local residents did not consider using it. He also cited the $80 million plan to redevelop the area.

On March 30, 1988, two days before the planned closure of the station on April 1, Ferrer held a press conference with other Bronx political leaders outside the station protesting the MTA's decision. Ferrer led a tour of the station, showing its use by drug addicts, and its state of disrepair. He said that Metro-North should be working to improve the station and better market the service instead of closing it. At the time, workers were sinking cement posts to board up the station in preparation for its closing. Metro-North planned to close the station on April 1, 1988, but delayed it by ninety days at the request of Bronx officials to allow the railroad and the community to study future development plans in the area and to reconsider the future of the station. The annual maintenance cost for the station was $27,000, or more than $1,300 per rider. Melrose was removed from the April 3, 1988 timetable in anticipation of its closing but was reinstated on the June 19, 1988 timetable as the station never did close.

In July 1988, Ferrer outlined several strategies to market the station and increase ridership. These included printing flyers publicizing the station and its scheduled stops to the Melrose community, including court facilities on 161st Street, the Concourse Village complex, and the Bronx Court Building, offering commuter discounts and free round-trips on a temporary basis, posting directional signs to the station's entrance, and installing mirrors to increase safety in the station. On August 16, 1989, Metro-North announced that it had dropped plans to close the station. The station had been kept open, cleaned up, and the issue was reviewed at the request of Ferrer.

=== Later changes ===
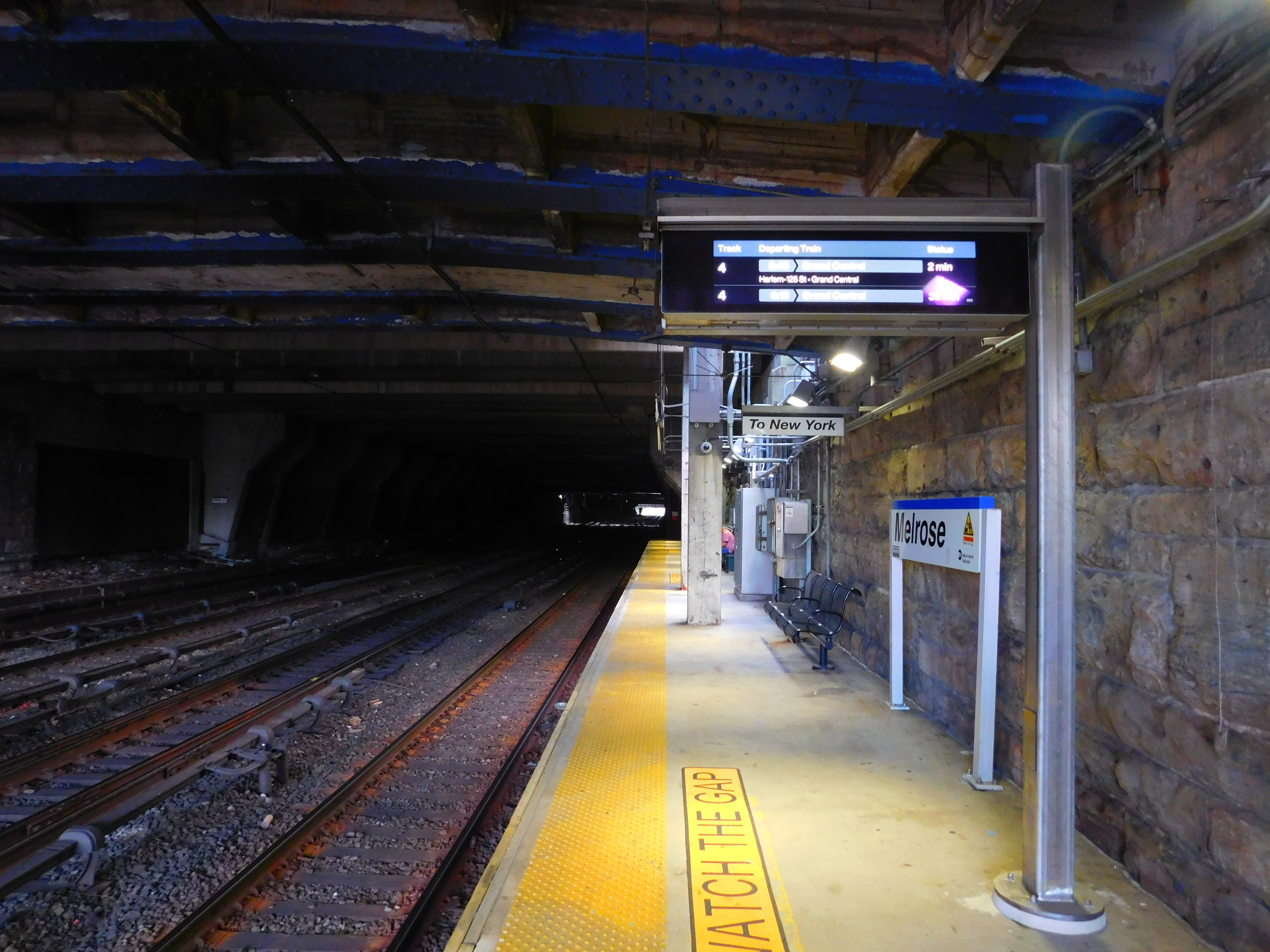
The inbound platform at Melrose station under East 162nd Street

On July 9, 2000 service at the station and Tremont was doubled, increasing from 11 weekday trains to 25 trains, and weekend service was restored, adding 19 daily trips. $2 million was provided in the MTA's 2000–2004 Capital Program to pay for new staircases at the station. Most of that funding went to Melrose as the station was hard to find because it was located partially underneath a high-rise building. In 2006, the station was renovated, and the northbound platform was moved out from underneath the overpass to its current location.

Prior to the opening of the Yankees–East 153rd Street station on the Hudson Line in 2009, the station was the closest station on the New York Central (later Penn Central) to Yankee Stadium. Specials ran to and from the station to serve events at the stadium.

In 2012, Melrose residents expressed concern regarding the station; residents would like to see more frequent service, but track and capacity limitations hinder the amount of service available for the stop. Other concerns regarded the lack of accessibility, and the past closure of the main entrance to the stop. The main entrance was closed when the community was at the height of its turmoil, but as the community has regained its footing the desire to have the station open to the primary commercial street, 161st Street, has grown.

== Station layout ==
The station has two offset high-level side platforms, each two cars long, serving the outer tracks of the four-track line. reached by stairway from East 162nd Street and Courtland Avenue. When trains stop at the station, normally the front two open cars receive and discharge passengers. The southbound platform is located underneath East 162nd Street and the New York City Housing Authority's Morrisania Air Rights public housing project. The station is located just south of a former wye with the northern terminus of the former Port Morris Branch.
