= Berkshire Hills Express =

American named passenger train (1919–1934)

Overview
- Service type: Inter-city rail
- Status: discontinued
- Locale: Northeastern United States
- First service: 1919
- Last service: 1934
- Former operators: New York Central Railroad & Boston & Albany Railroad

Route
- Termini: New York, New York; North Adams, Massachusetts
- Distance travelled: 175.5 miles (282.4 km)
- Service frequency: Daily (shortened on Sundays to Pittsfield)
- Train numbers: 911 (southbound); 916 (northbound)

On-board services
- Seating arrangements: Coach
- Catering facilities: Buffet car
- Observation facilities: Parlor car

The Berkshire Hills Express was a full-service passenger train of the New York Central Railroad that went from New York City to North Adams, Massachusetts, in the Berkshires. It served as a channel for tourist travel from downstate New York, through the Taconic Mountains, to resorts and other attractions in the Berkshires and for students traveling to Williams College, 11 miles west of North Adams. The train operated from 1919 to 1934. However, it continued in unnamed form for nearly two decades longer.

== Route ==
The train, carrying the number, #916, departing mid-afternoon, went in express fashion on the New York Central's Harlem Line, bypassing most stations between 125th Street Station and Chatham, New York. From Chatham, the train headed east on the territory of the Boston and Albany Railroad that the NYC had leased, to Pittsfield, and then headed north on the B&A's North Adams branch. The train took the name, New York Express and #911 on the southbound route to New York City. In addition to carrying coach cars it included a buffet car and parlor car as well.

Following the NYC's dropping of the Berkshire Hills Express and New York Express in 1934, the train continued as #1516 north and #5417 south. By this time a morning train took the route as well in both directions.

== Demise ==
In 1950, the through service to North Adams was trimmed to a shuttle from Chatham to North Adams, requiring a transfer at Chatham. Passenger service between Chatham and North Adams ended in 1953.

== See also ==
- Berkshire Flyer
