= Wassaic station =

Metro-North Railroad station in New York

Wassaic
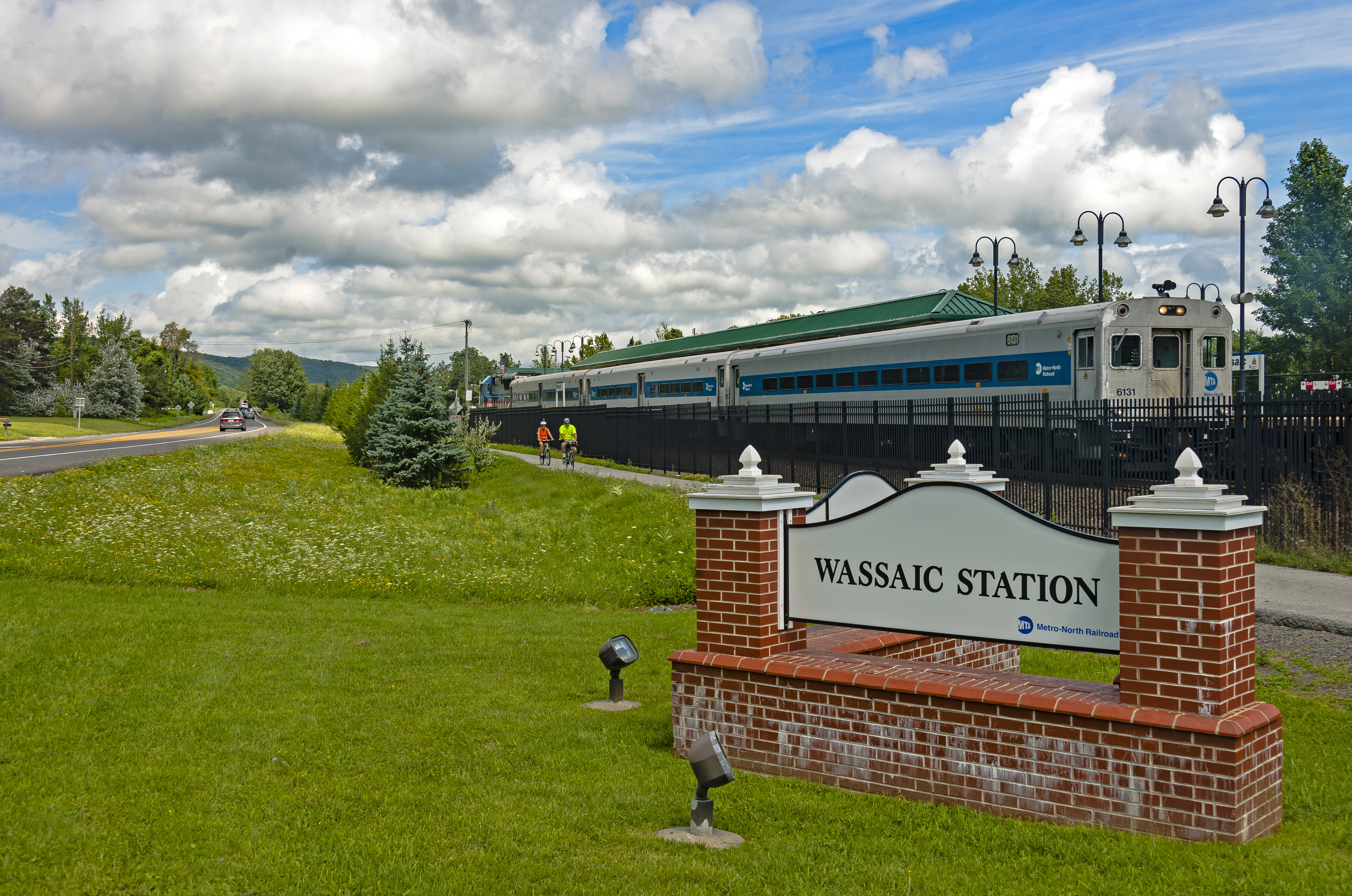
- Train departing the station, seen from its entrance road to the south

General information
- Location: Wassaic, New York
- Coordinates: 41.8147°N 73.5623°W
- Line: Harlem Line
- Platforms: 1 side platform
- Tracks: 1
- Connections: Harlem Valley Rail Trail

Construction
- Accessible: yes

Other information
- Fare zone: 10

History
- Opened: 1857; 169 years ago
- Closed: March 20, 1972; 54 years ago
- Rebuilt: July 9, 2000; 26 years ago

Passengers
- 2018: 241 (Metro-North)
- Rank: 87 of 109

Services
Preceding station	Metro-North Railroad	Following station
Tenmile River toward Southeast or Grand Central	Harlem Line	Terminus

Former services
Preceding station	New York Central Railroad	Following station
State School toward New York	Harlem Division	Amenia toward Chatham
Location

Wassaic station is a commuter rail stop on the Metro-North Railroad's Harlem Line, located in the town of Amenia, New York. It is the northern terminal of the Harlem Line.

The station is located on New York State Routes 22 and 343 just north of the hamlet of Wassaic.

== History ==
The original Wassaic station was located approximately 0.5 miles south of the current site, within the hamlet of Wassaic, New York. It was operated by the New York & Harlem Railroad, later by the New York Central Railroad (NYC), and served local communities, including areas in western Connecticut. The establishment of the station led to the development of a nearby hotel and freight service for three local industries.

In 1968, NYC merged with the Pennsylvania Railroad to form Penn Central Transportation Company (PC), which assumed control of the line. On March 20, 1972, PC abandoned service north of Dover Plains. In 1990, tracks were removed from Millerton south to milepost 81.33, ending freight operations beyond that point.

The Harlem Line's current terminus is just north of the Wassaic Yard at milepost 83.68. No track exists beyond this point, though the former railbed remains visible. The Harlem Valley Rail Trail now occupies portions of the abandoned right-of-way. Approximately 45.8 miles (35.9%) of track were removed in two phases following legal disputes.

On July 9, 2000, Metro-North Railroad reopened the Wassaic station after rehabilitating track and grade crossings north of Dover Plains. The new station was constructed 0.5 miles north of the original location, along with a rail yard. Track was reinstalled over approximately 0.75 miles of the former roadbed to extend service to the new terminus.

== Station layout ==
The station has one four-car-long high-level side platform to the east of the track. A small storage yard exists to the north of the station platform.
