= Southeast station =

Metro-North Railroad station in New York

Southeast
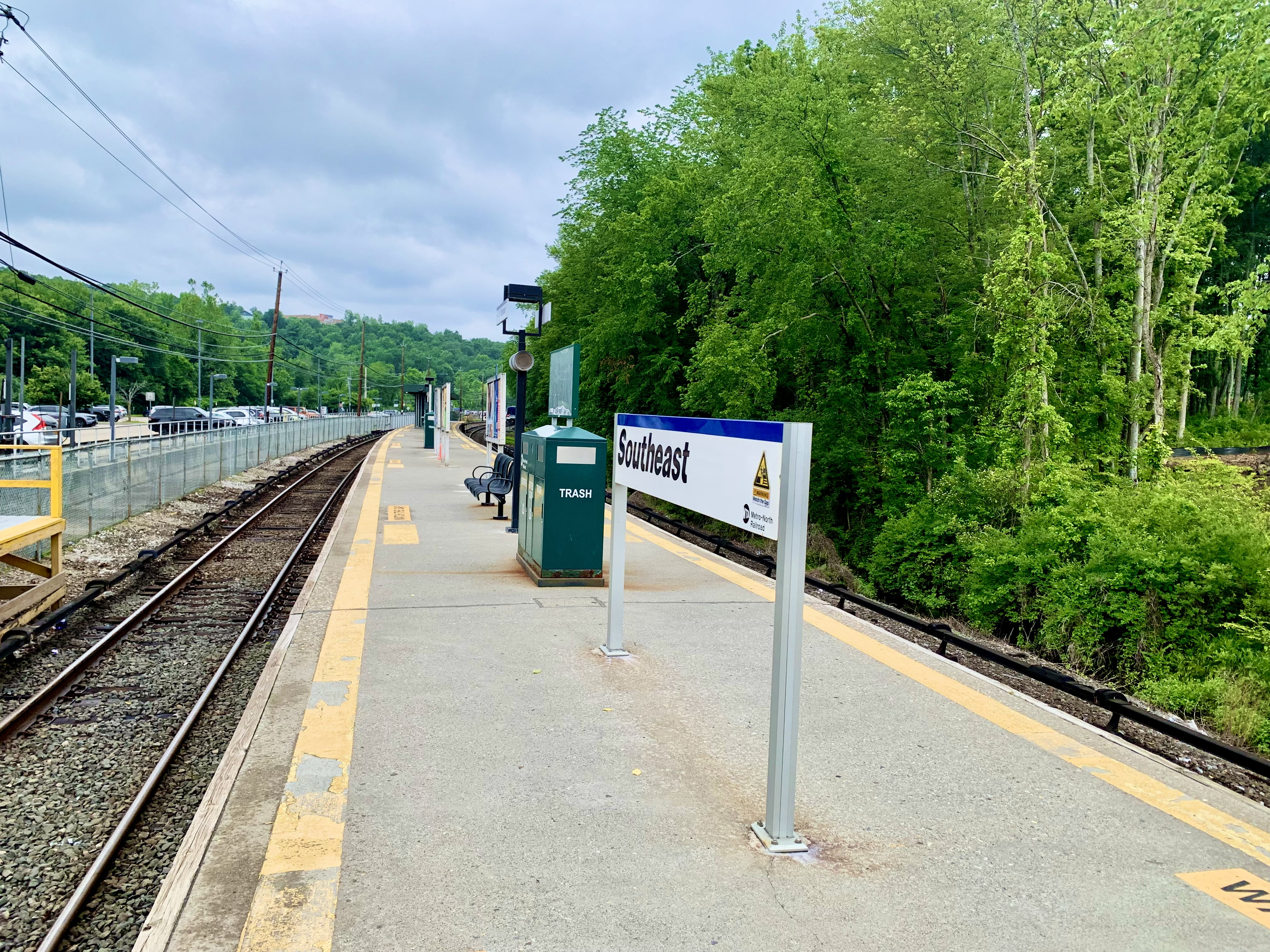
- The Southeast Metro-North train station.

General information
- Location: 1 Independent Way, Brewster, New York
- Coordinates: 41.4127°N 73.6230°W
- Line: Harlem Line
- Platforms: 1 island platform
- Tracks: 2
- Connections: Housatonic Area Regional Transit: New Fairfield Shuttle; Putnam Transit: Putnam On-Demand Microtransit

Construction
- Parking: 1,010 spaces
- Accessible: yes

Other information
- Fare zone: 7

History
- Opened: December 1, 1980
- Electrified: 1984; 700V (DC) third rail
- Former names: Brewster North (1980–2003)

Passengers
- 2018: 1,829 (includes transfers) (Metro-North)
- Rank: 35 of 109

Services
| Preceding station | Metro-North Railroad | Following station |
|---|---|---|
| Brewster toward Grand Central | Harlem Line | Terminus |
| Brewster toward Grand Central | Harlem Line | Patterson toward Wassaic |
| Terminus | Harlem Line | Patterson toward Wassaic |
Location

Southeast station (formerly known as Brewster North station) is a commuter rail stop on the Metro-North Railroad's Harlem Line, located in the town of Southeast, New York. It is the northern terminus of the Harlem Line electrified service, and with the exception of rush hour service, passengers heading to stations further north to Wassaic have to transfer here to connecting diesel powered service.

== History ==
The current terminal complex opened on December 1, 1980 as a delayed replacement for the Dykeman's station, closed over a decade earlier, and took its current name in October 2003.

== Station layout ==
The station has one eight-car-long high-level island platform serving trains in both directions. North of the station, the two tracks merge and electrification ends. Just south of the station is Metro-North's Southeast Diesel Maintenance Facility.

The extensive parking at the station is fed by a wide, 1-mile (1.6 km) access road known as Independent Way that connects to NY 312 right next to its interchange with Interstate 84, making it very convenient to reach. There is no disabled-accessible parking available at the station, other than for town residents with permits or for a maximum 16-hour metered period. The station traffic has led to the construction of a shopping plaza and Home Depot along the road at the crest of the rise between the exit and the station; it can easily be seen when approaching the exit along I-84 eastbound.
