= First American International Road Race =

Stock car race in New York in 1908

1908 First American International Road Race
Race details
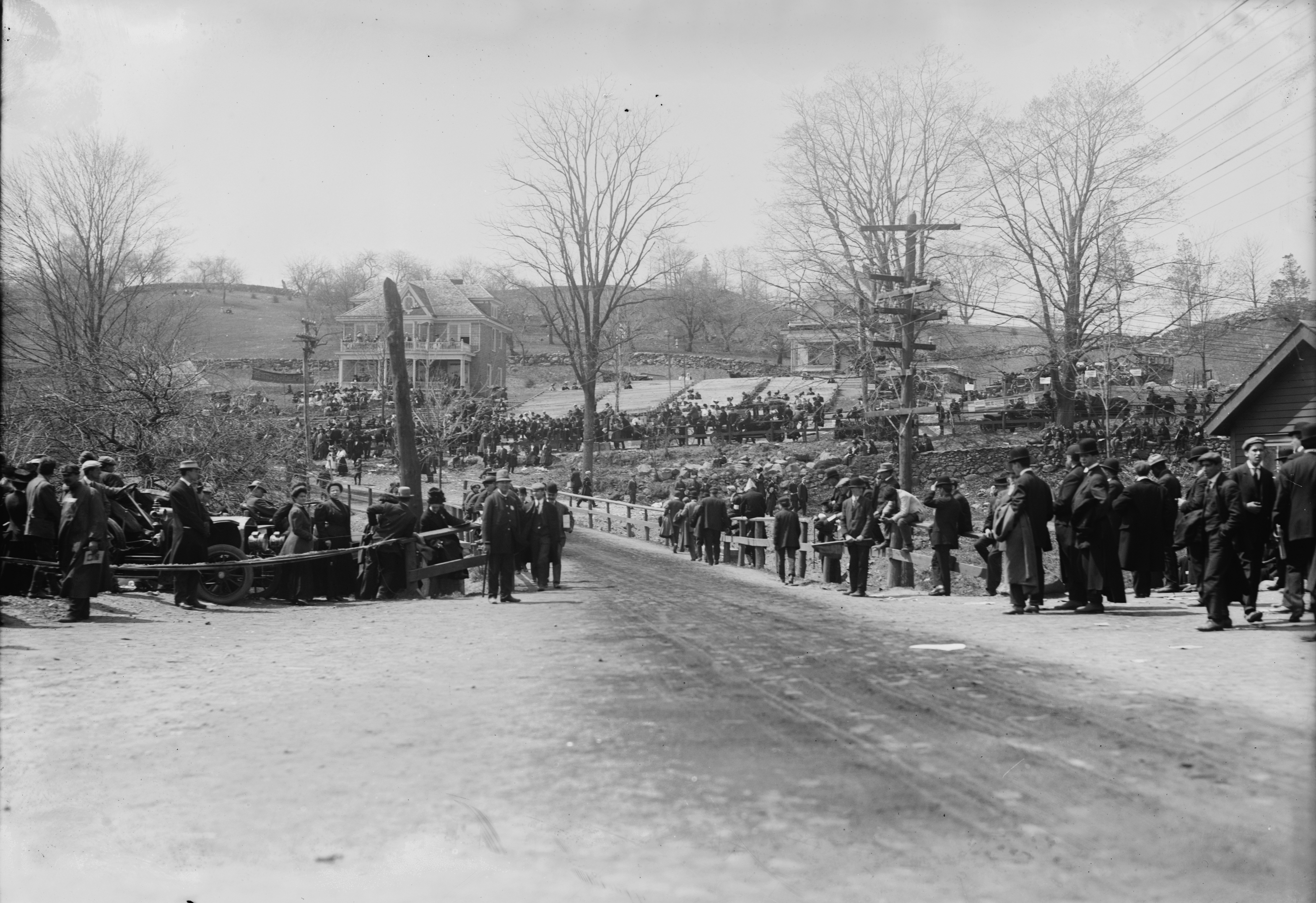
- Spectators for the race in Briarcliff Manor
- Date: April 24th, 1908
- Location: Westchester County, New York
- Course: Temporary street circuit 32.4 mi / 52.1 km
- Distance: 8 laps 259.2 mi / 417.1 km

Pole position
- Driver: Paul Sartori (Percy Owen, Inc.)

Fastest lap
- Driver: Emmanuel Cedrino (Fiat Automobiles)
- Time: 36:48 (on lap 8 of 8)

Podium
- First: Lewis Strang (John H. Tyson)
- Second: Emmanuel Cedrino (Fiat Company)
- Third: Guy Vaughan (Wyckoff, Church and Partridge)

The First American International Road Race, informally known as the Briarcliff Trophy Race, was a stock car race in Westchester County, New York, in April 1908. The race was sponsored by and centered around the village of Briarcliff Manor. The race was the first automobile race in Westchester and the first international stock car race in the United States. (Note: Automobile races in the U.S. dated to the 1880s, though none had mandated the use of production cars and featured international entries.)

The race began and ended in Briarcliff, spanning from 4:45 a.m. to 12:20 p.m. on April 24, 1908. The winner, Lewis Strang in an Isotta Fraschini, covered the 259 miles (417 km) in five hours and fourteen minutes. More than 300,000 people watched the race throughout Westchester County, and the village had more than 100,000 visitors that day.

== Background ==
The race chairman was Robert Lee Morrell; he headed a committee of four men: S. R. Stevens, Alfred Reeves, E. T. Birdsall, and C. R. Mabley. Colgate Hoyt and A. R. Pardington served as referee and associate referee.

One thousand soldiers from the state's 12th and 20th regiments of the National Guard were deployed at important points along the course for crowd control, along with hundreds of policemen. Marshals were hired to wave red flags to drivers for safety on blind turns and yellow flags to caution drivers to reduce their speed on dangerous turns.

The New York Times and local newspapers created publicity for the event. The Lozier Company set up a wireless telegraph system in Briarcliff, allowing the Times to give accounts of the race to Times Square audiences within minutes.

== Course ==
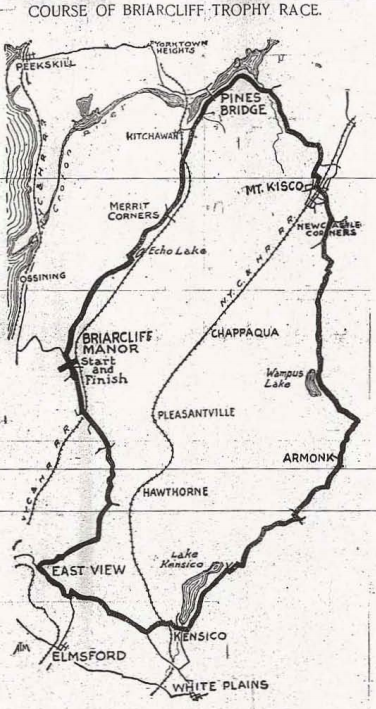
Course map of the 1908 race

The course spanned over much of Westchester County, from Briarcliff Manor north to Millwood, Kitchawan, and Pines Bridge, before going south to Mount Kisco, Wampus Lake, Armonk, Kenisco, and Valhalla, and then roughly north again to Eastview, Hawthorne, and then back to Briarcliff Manor. The 32.4-mile (52.1 km) circuit was to be completed eight times, a total of 259.2 miles (417.1 km). Original plans scheduled that ten laps of the course be completed, for a total of 324 miles (521 km).

The route had sharp turns, narrow stretches, hills, and other hazards. The area around the Kensico Reservoir had numerous sharp S curves, while an eight-mile stretch from Pines Bridge to Mount Kisco had weak wooden fences serving as the only barrier between the road and the Croton Reservoir. Reporting before the race indicated that the stretch between Valhalla and Eastview was the worst due to muddy and rutted roadbeds, steep inclines, and a narrow winding road. Based on the perilous conditions, rated as the toughest on which a road race had ever been held, the drivers speculated that 40 mph (64 km/h) could be a high average speed, but 45 mph (72 km/h) could be the winning speed. The drivers speculated that six cars might finish the entire circuit, with the other vehicles breaking down or succumbing to accidents.

Various grandstands with good views were placed along the route, though viewers also chose to watch at more dangerous points, including S- and L-shaped curves near Valhalla, anticipated as the most dangerous place. The stretch from Eastview to Kitchawan was considered the best for speeding, estimated that cars could reach 70 mph (110 km/h) at parts of the stretch. Six ambulance stations were also set up, in Armonk, Valhalla, Eastview, Hawthorne, Millwood, and Mount Kisco.

== Entrants ==
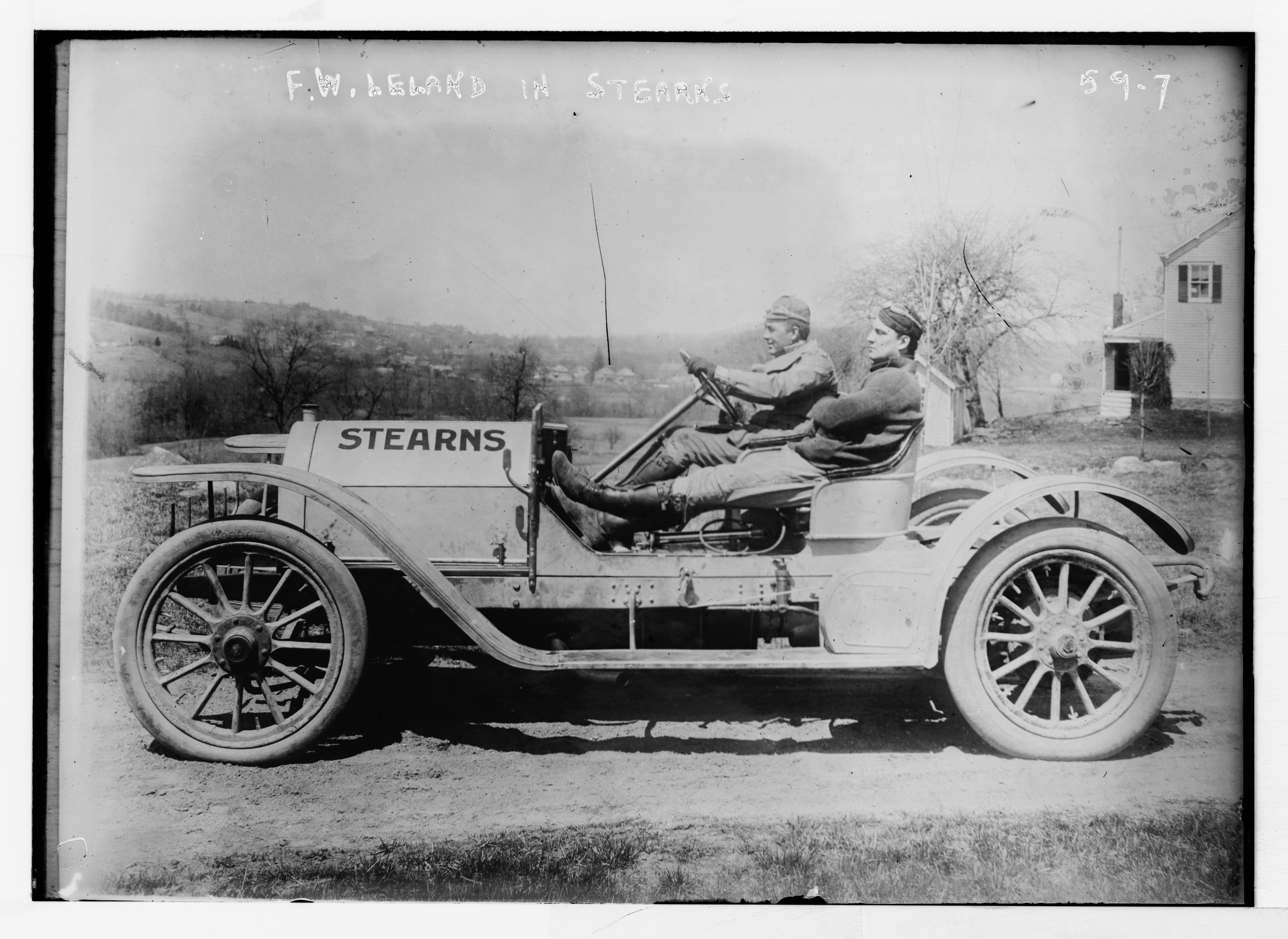
Frank Leland in his Stearns car

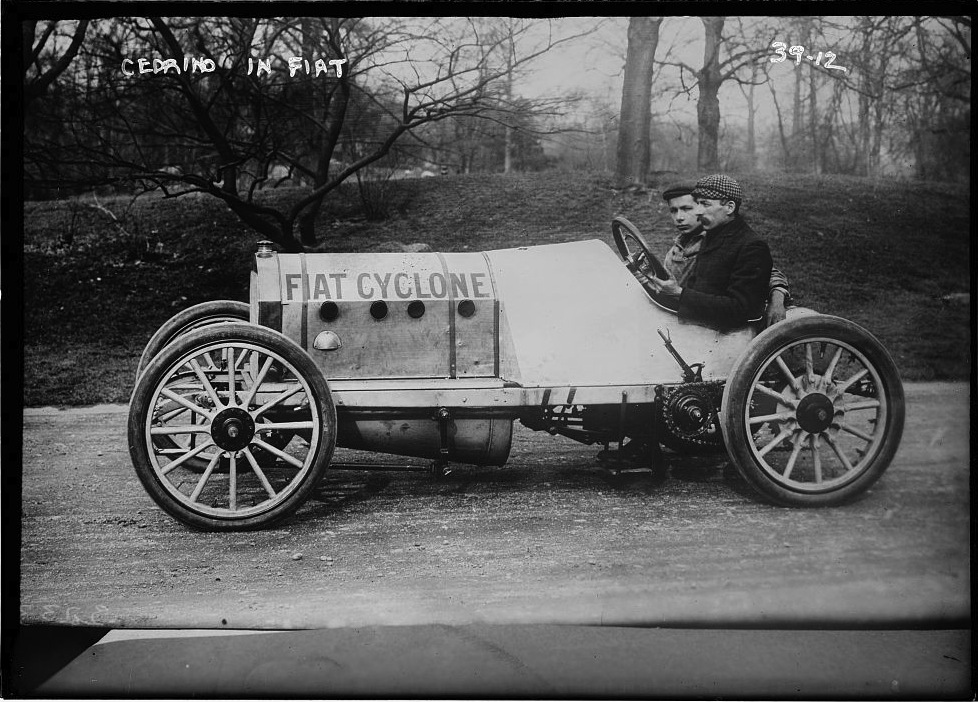
Emanuel Cedrino in his Fiat 'Cyclone'

The race had 22 entrants with vehicles from five countries: Austria, France, Germany, Italy, and the United States. 19 of the cars had four speeds, while the Isottas had three speeds. All were four-cylinder stock cars. The Loziers and Renaults were shaft driven, while the other cars were chain driven.

All 22 entrants were men. Joan Cuneo, the most prominent female racing driver of the time as stated in MetroSports Magazine, visited the course, wanted to participate, and submitted the $1,000 entry fee. The race's committee questioned whether a woman could control an automobile during a race, and denied her entry.

The entrants were:

Entrants for the race
No.	Make	Entrant	Manufacture	Driver	hp	Wheelbase inches (mm)	Position/condition at finish	Time	Notes
1	Bianchi	Percy Owen, Inc.	Italy	Paul Sartori	40	119 (3,000)	5th	5h53m45.6	Originally scheduled for Felix Prossen to drive
2	Fiat	Fiat Automobiles	Italy	Emmanuel Cedrino	60	117 (3,000)	2nd	5h21m05.4	
3	Apperson	Bowman Automobile Company	Kokomo, IN	Herbert Lytle	50	106 (2,700)	4th	5h39m15.4	
4	Isotta	Isotta Fraschini	Italy	Lewis Strang	50	118 (3,000)	1st	5h14m13.2	
5	Stearns	Frank B. Stearns	Cleveland, OH	Frank Leland	30	120 (3,000)	Operational, on 8th lap	N/A	
6	Fiat	Fiat Automobiles	Italy	Edwin H. Parker	60	117 (3,000)	Cracked cylinder, on 4th lap	N/A	
7	Lozier	Lozier Motor Company	Plattsburgh, NY	Harry Michener	45	124 (3,100)	Operational, on 8th lap	N/A	
8	Stearns	Wyckoff, Church & Partridge	Cleveland, OH	Guy Vaughan	30	120 (3,000)	3rd	5h28m20.4	
9	Lozier	Lozier Motor Company	Plattsburgh, NY	Ralph Mulford	45	124 (3,100)	Driver hurt, on 5th lap	N/A	
10	Maja (DMG)	John J. Brown	Austria	Daniel Murphy	35	118 (3,000)	Collapsed wheel, on 4th lap	N/A	
11	Isotta	Isotta Fraschini	Italy	Al Poole	50	118 (3,000)	Operational, on 8th lap	N/A	
12	Thomas	Harry S. Houpt	Buffalo, NY	Montague Roberts	60	112 (2,800)	Operational, on 8th lap	N/A	
13	Stearns	Wyckoff, Church & Partridge	Cleveland, OH	Barney Oldfield	30	120 (3,000)	Operational, on 8th lap	N/A	
14	Renault	Paul Lacroix	France	Maurice G. Bernin	35-45	112 (2,800)	Operational, on 8th lap	N/A	
15	Panhard	Panhard et Levassor	France	George Robertson	50	118 (3,000)	Operational, on 7th lap	N/A	
16	Hol-Tan Shawmut	Hol-Tan Company	New York, NY	William M. Hilliard	40	108 (2,700)	Operational, on 8th lap	N/A	
17	Allen Kingston	Walter C. Allen	Kingston, NY	Ralph DePalma	40-45	118 (3,000)	Crashed, on 5th lap	N/A	Originally scheduled for Arthur Campbell to drive
18	Renault	Paul Lacroix	France	Julien Bloch	35-45	112 (2,800)	Operational, on 8th lap	N/A	
19	Isotta	Isotta Fraschini	Italy	Hugh N. Harding	50	118 (3,000)	Operational, on 8th lap	N/A	
20	Benz	Louis J. Bergdoll	Germany	Louis J. Bergdoll	60	118 (3,000)	Operational, on 8th lap	N/A	
21	Simplex	Palmer & Singer Manufacturing	New Brunswick, NJ	Morton J. Seymour	50	124 (3,100)	Operational, on 8th lap	N/A	
22	Simplex	Palmer & Singer Manufacturing	New Brunswick, NJ	William Watson	50	124 (3,100)	Operational, on 6th lap	N/A	

== Timeline of the race ==
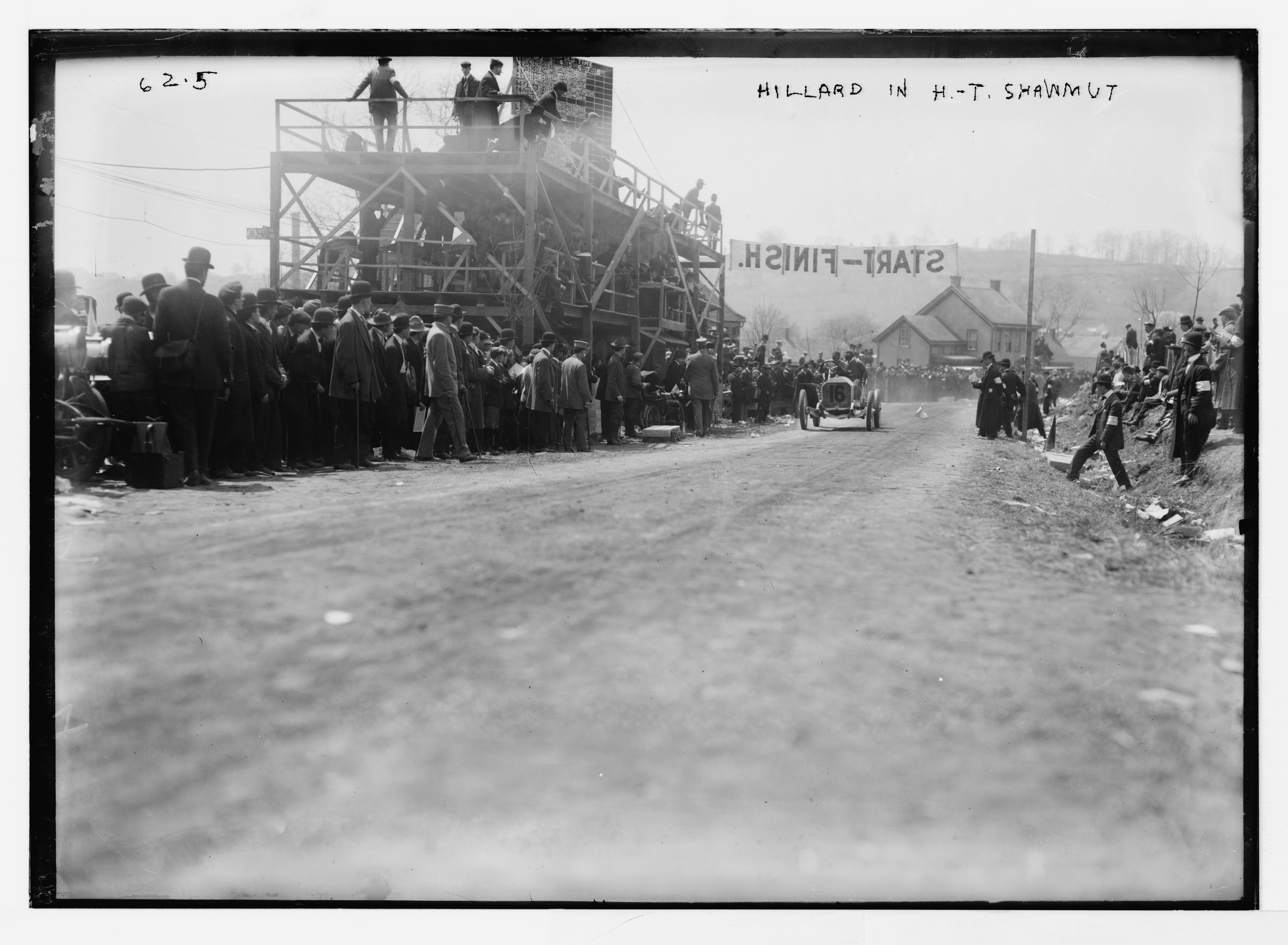
Start and finish line in Briarcliff Manor during the race

A technical committee reviewed the cars before the race, requiring them to be regular production models available to the public, and that the company has already built at least ten cars of that type. The drivers were allowed to practice on the course several weeks before the race. Local municipalities suspended their speed limits during early morning hours to allow the racers the ability to practice.

Minor accidents occurred in these practice runs, including one on April 21. Arthur Campbell's vision was obscured by a dust cloud, leading him to strike the railing of a bridge. The car went into a stream and Campbell catapulted out of the car into some rocks, knocking teeth loose and breaking his jaw. Ralph DePalma, his riding mechanic, landed underneath the car and had to be pulled out. DePalma took Campbell's place in the competition, and the car was taken to a garage for repairs, though it is not clear if it was repaired sufficiently for the race.

=== Day of the race ===
The race had significant publicity in The New York Times, along with front-page coverage in city newspapers across the U.S. The strong press coverage led to expectations of thousands of attendees. On the day of the race, tourists from New England cities arrived in cars and by train. The New York Central Railroad added special trains leaving from Grand Central Terminal to the Valhalla and Mount Kisco stations near the course, from 1:15 a.m. and every 15 minutes afterward. The trains left on time, though inexplicably, many took about three hours to reach parts of the course, instead of the usual hour. This led to chaotic crowds arriving late by a grandstand, and 200 marshalls pushed back the crowd to clear the roadway. Overall more than 300,000 people watched the race throughout Westchester County, and Briarcliff Manor had more than 100,000 visitors that day.

The Briarcliff Lodge was filed with activity, and charged $10 for a cot or bunk in a shared room. Farmers built seating and charged for its use during the event. Booths were set up along the course, selling tires to racers and tourists, while advertisements for items including motor oil, cars, and cigarettes were placed on trees and telephone poles in the area.

The race was set to start at 4:45 a.m. The pole position, Paul Sartori, first pulled away from the starting line at 5:08 a.m. The race was finished by 12:20 p.m.; five cars had completed the eight laps, and the judges decided to end the race there, having determined nothing more could be gained in continuing it. Cedrino achieved the fastest two rounds in the race: 37 minutes and 16 seconds in his seventh lap and 36 minutes and 48 seconds in his eighth.

== Winner and trophy ==
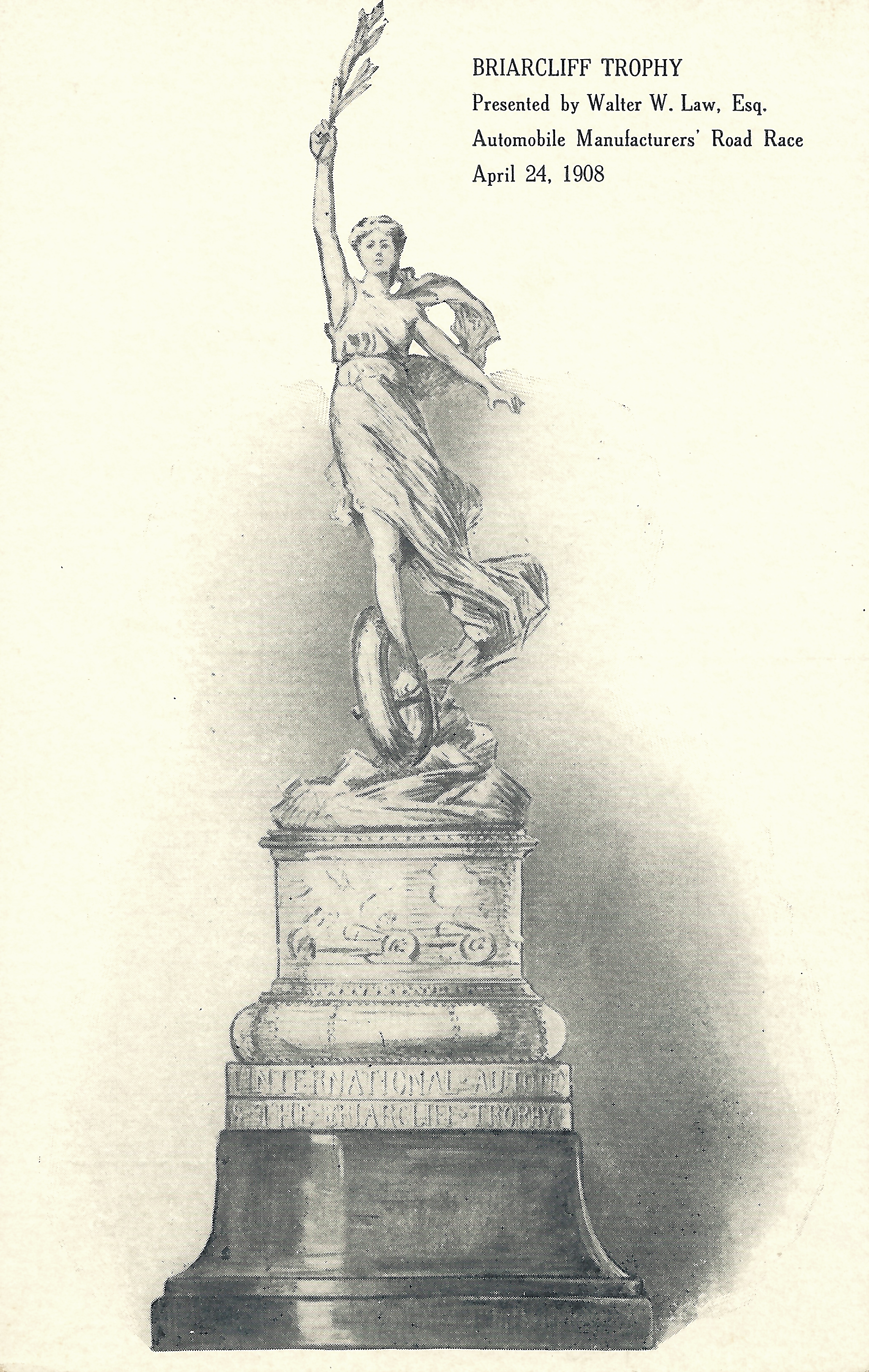
Illustration of the Briarcliff Trophy

The prize, the Briarcliff Trophy valued at over $10,000 ($358,300 in 2025), was donated and presented by Briarcliff Manor founder Walter W. Law.

The winner, Lewis Strang, practiced for five weeks in a six-cylinder Ford owned by John H. Tyson. The Isotta he used in the competition (also owned by Tyson) was only driven over the course twice before the race, and was otherwise locked and guarded in the owner's garage. In the race, Strang took the lead on the first lap and never let go, thus winning the race and trophy. He had consistently made four of his laps in just over 38 minutes. John Tyson claimed to have spent $25,000 to win the trophy but gave Strang credit for the triumph. Strang received $1,000, along with a $5,000 bonus from Tyson. His mechanic received $500 along with a bonus.

== Aftermath and impact ==
The race helped prove claims of its committee that it was the best possible test for cars to be driven on American roads, leading to discussions worldwide for months after the race.

Emmanuel Cedrino, initially seen as a likely winner of the competition, died a month after the Briarcliff race in a racing accident at the Pimlico Race Course in Baltimore.

On November 12, 1934, the Automobile Racing Club of America held another road race in Briarcliff Manor. It was the first amateur race in the United States, hosted by the wealthy Collier family of nearby Pocantico Hills. Brothers Sam, Miles, and Barron Jr. had begun hosting informal races in the area in the early 1930s, and formed the racing club in 1933. The 1934 race was won by Langdon Quimby, driving a Willys 77, in a time of two hours and seven minutes on the 100-mile (160 km) course. The race was held again on June 23, 1935; Quimby won again, four minutes faster than the previous year.

In 1938, exactly 30 years after his accident, Ralph DePalma returned to the route. He met with the doctor who had treated him and they revisited the scene of the accident, an event that unexpectedly started his racing career. By this time, DePalma was internationally known for racing, having won 2,257 races, 98 percent of those he entered.

In 1977, during Briarcliff Manor's 75th anniversary, 15 old racing cars participated in a motorcade around the 1934 race's route. In 2008, the village commemorated the first race's centennial in a parade featuring about 60 antique cars.

== See also ==
- History of Briarcliff Manor
