= Bedford Hills =

Bedford Hills may refer to the following places in the United States:

- Bedford Hills, New York
  - Bedford Hills (Metro-North station) in Bedford Hills, New York
  - Bedford Hills Correctional Facility for Women, a prison for women in Bedford Hills, New York
- Bedford Hills, Virginia
