= Katonah station =

Metro-North Railroad station in New York

Katonah
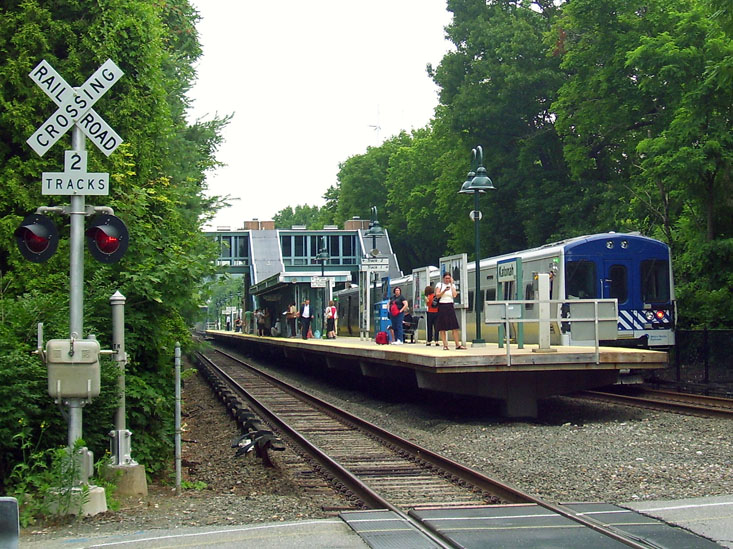
- Northbound Harlem Line train at Katonah

General information
- Location: 70 Katonah Avenue, Katonah, New York
- Coordinates: 41.2598°N 73.6841°W
- Line: Harlem Line
- Platforms: 1 island platform
- Tracks: 2
- Connections: Bee-Line: 19; Housatonic Area Regional Transit: Ridgefield Shuttle

Construction
- Accessible: yes

Other information
- Fare zone: 6 (Metro-North)

History
- Opened: June 1, 1847
- Electrified: 1984; 700V (DC) third rail
- Former names: Mechanicsville

Passengers
- 2018: 1,211 (Metro-North)
- Rank: 50 of 109

Services
Preceding station	Metro-North Railroad	Following station
Bedford Hills toward Grand Central	Harlem Line	Goldens Bridge toward Southeast

Former services
Preceding station	New York Central Railroad	Following station
Bedford Hills toward New York	Harlem Division	Goldens Bridge toward Chatham
Location

Katonah station is a commuter rail stop on the Metro-North Railroad's Harlem Line, located in Katonah, New York.

As is the case with Brewster, Katonah is not far from the Connecticut border and sees a sizeable number of commuters from Ridgefield using Katonah for commuting as opposed to the Danbury Branch of the New Haven Line given that Katonah gives a faster, direct trip to Grand Central. Similarly, Housatonic Area Regional Transit has a shuttle connecting Ridgefield to Katonah station during peak hours which also connects to Bee-Line Route 19 to Ossining.

The station was also formerly known as Mechanicsville.

== History ==
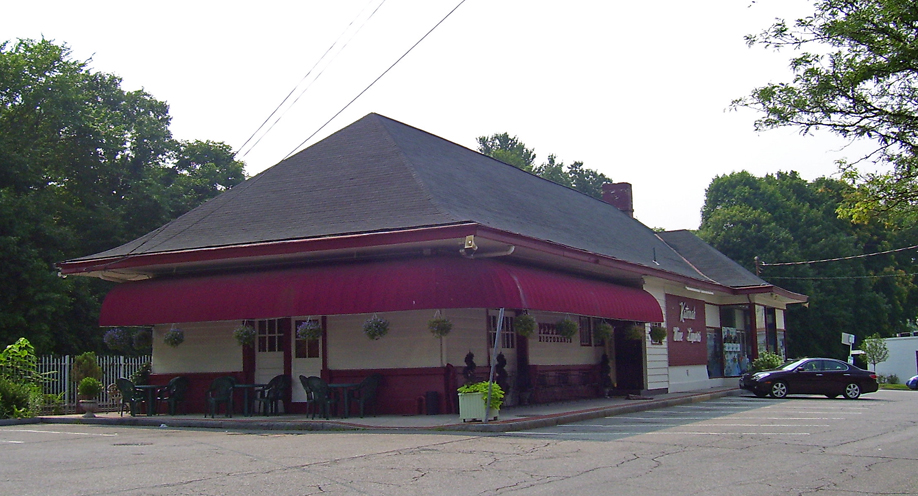
The old station, currently home to several retail tenants.

The original depot at Katonah was moved from its location in "Old Katonah" in 1897, prior to the flooding of the Croton River valley for the New Croton Reservoir, which is today a private residence in the village of Katonah. A second station (picture on the left) was built in 1910 to replace it. In 1954, New York Central closed the ticket agency in the Katonah station, and the building was later sold to private owners. A small waiting room was maintained for passengers through 1984, when Metro-North opened its new station immediately north of Jay Street crossing. A bridge over the Muscoot Reservoir for Lakeside Road north of the Lakeside Road parking lot was converted into a connecting ramp from Interstate 684 at the southbound on-ramp of exit 6, but was later closed.

== Station layout ==
The station has one eight-car-long high-level island platform serving trains in both directions. Like Brewster, there is a grade crossing adjacent, just to the south of the station. It remains closed the entire time a southbound train is at the station. Similar to both Brewster and Croton Falls, it is right in the village's downtown business district.
