= Timeline of Briarcliff Manor =

Coordinates: 41.15°N 73.85°W

Historical population
Year	Pop.	±% p.a.
1910	950	—
1920	1,027	+0.78%
1930	1,794	+5.74%
1940	1,830	+0.20%
1950	2,494	+3.14%
1960	5,105	+7.43%
1970	6,521	+2.48%
1980	7,115	+0.88%
1990	7,070	−0.06%
2000	7,696	+0.85%
2010	7,867	+0.22%
Sources: * 1910 to 1940 * 1950 to 2000 * 2010

The history of Briarcliff Manor, a village in Westchester County, New York, can be traced back to the founding of a settlement between the Hudson and Pocantico Rivers in the 19th century. The area now known as Briarcliff Manor had seen human occupation since at least the Archaic period, but significant growth in the settlements that are now incorporated into the village did not occur until the Industrial Revolution. The village, which was incorporated with one square mile in 1902, has expanded primarily through annexation: of Scarborough in 1906 and from the town of Mount Pleasant in 1927 to its current area of 6.7 square miles (17 km^{2}). The village has also grown in population; from 331 when established to 7,867 in the 2010 census.

== Prehistory ==
- Archaic period: Around this time, the area of Scarborough-on-Hudson is first inhabited.
- Precolonial era: The area of present-day Briarcliff Manor is inhabited by a band of the Wappinger tribes of Native Americans known as Sint Sincks (or "Sing Sings").

== 17th century ==
- 1680: Frederick Philipse purchases the Ossining area from Indian sachem Ghoharius with the consent of his brother Weskora. Weskora becomes the first name of Scarborough.
- August 4, 1685: Philipse purchases about 156,000 acres (630 km^{2}) from the Sint Sincks, Philipsburg Manor, extending from Spuyten Duyvil Creek along the Hudson River to the Croton River.

== 18th century ==
- 1778: The Wappingers unsuccessfully attempt to sue the Philipse family for control of the land; their claim dies out after around fifty tribespeople, organized into the Stockbridge Militia under Abraham Nimham and his father Daniel Nimham, are killed by British forces in the Battle of Kingsbridge during the American Revolutionary War.
- 1779: The New York State Commission on Forfeiture confiscates the Philipses' land; it is sold in 1784–85.

== 19th century ==
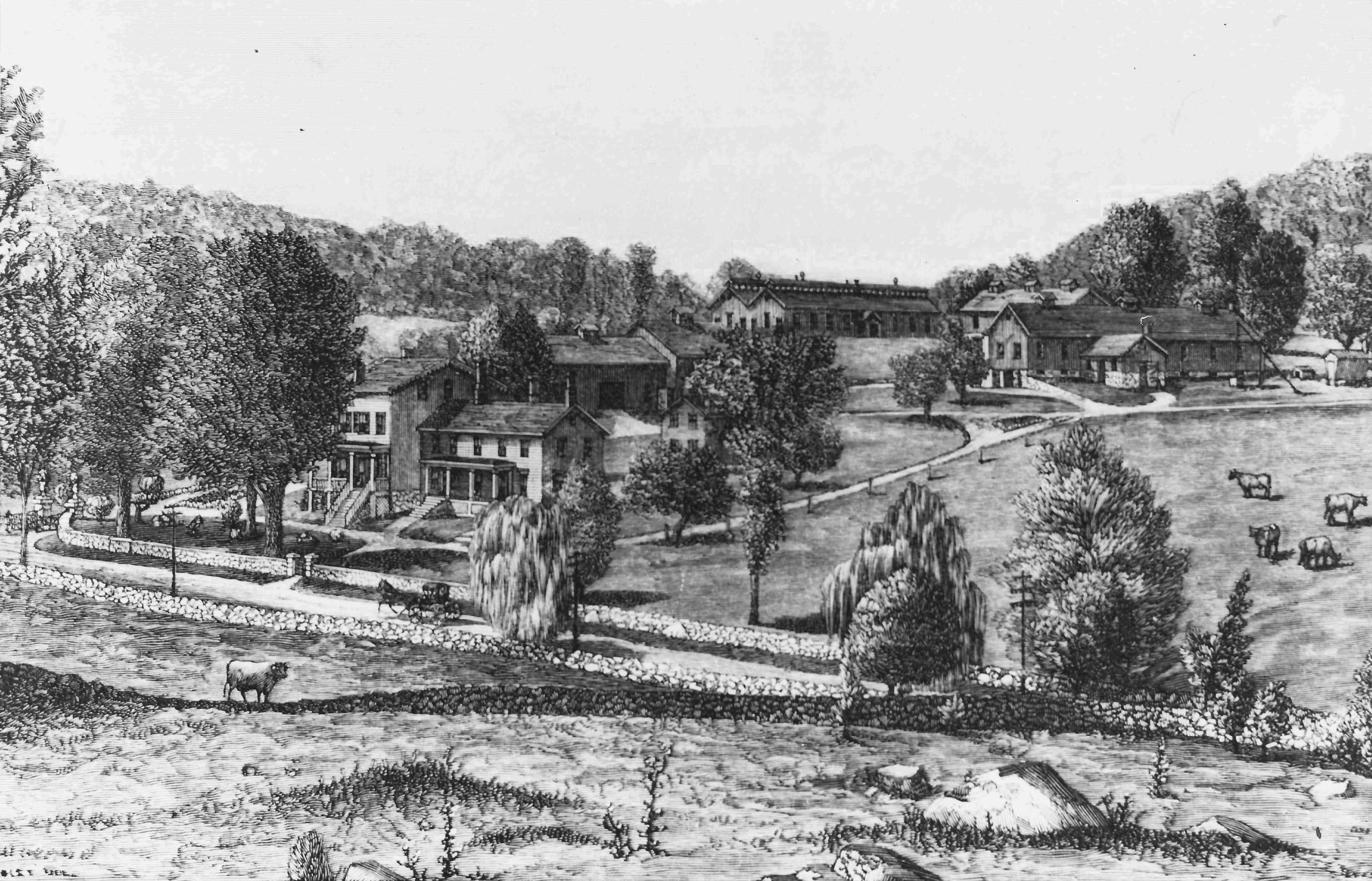
Illustration of James Stillman's farm c. 1886. (Note: Part of the farmhouse currently survives as the rectory of St. Theresa's Catholic Church.)

- 1839: Briarcliff Manor's oldest church, Saint Mary's Episcopal Church, is founded.
- 1854: All Saints' Episcopal Church is founded.
- 1864: Weskora is renamed Scarborough.
- 1865: A one-room schoolhouse is built on land donated by John Whitson; it is the first schoolhouse and church in the area.
- 1880: The Whitson's Corners station is added to the New York City & Northern Railroad train schedule, and the first train arrives on December 13.
- 1881: The Whitson's Corners post office is established.
- 1890: Walter W. Law moves with his family to the area and purchases his first 236 acres (96 ha) with the James Stillman farm for $35,000 ($1,254,200 in 2025).
- 1891: Congregation Sons of Israel is formed by eleven men in Ossining.
- 1892: Elliott Fitch Shepard ordered the construction of Scarborough's first dock at the present Scarborough Park to allow construction materials to be shipped to his property.
- October 13, 1893: The Scarborough Presbyterian Church is founded.
- 1895: Elliott Fitch Shepard's mansion Woodlea is completed.
- 1896: Briarcliff Congregational Church is built to replace the congregation's use of the schoolhouse.
- 1897: The post office is renamed the Briarcliff Manor Post Office.
- August 4, 1898: The first Scarborough train station and post office is struck by lightning and burns down.
- 1900: Law owns more than 5,000 acres (7.8 sq mi) of Westchester County, and becomes the largest individual landholder in the county.
- 1900: Law establishes the School of Practical Agriculture on Pleasantville Road on 66 acres (0.1 sq mi).

== 20th century ==
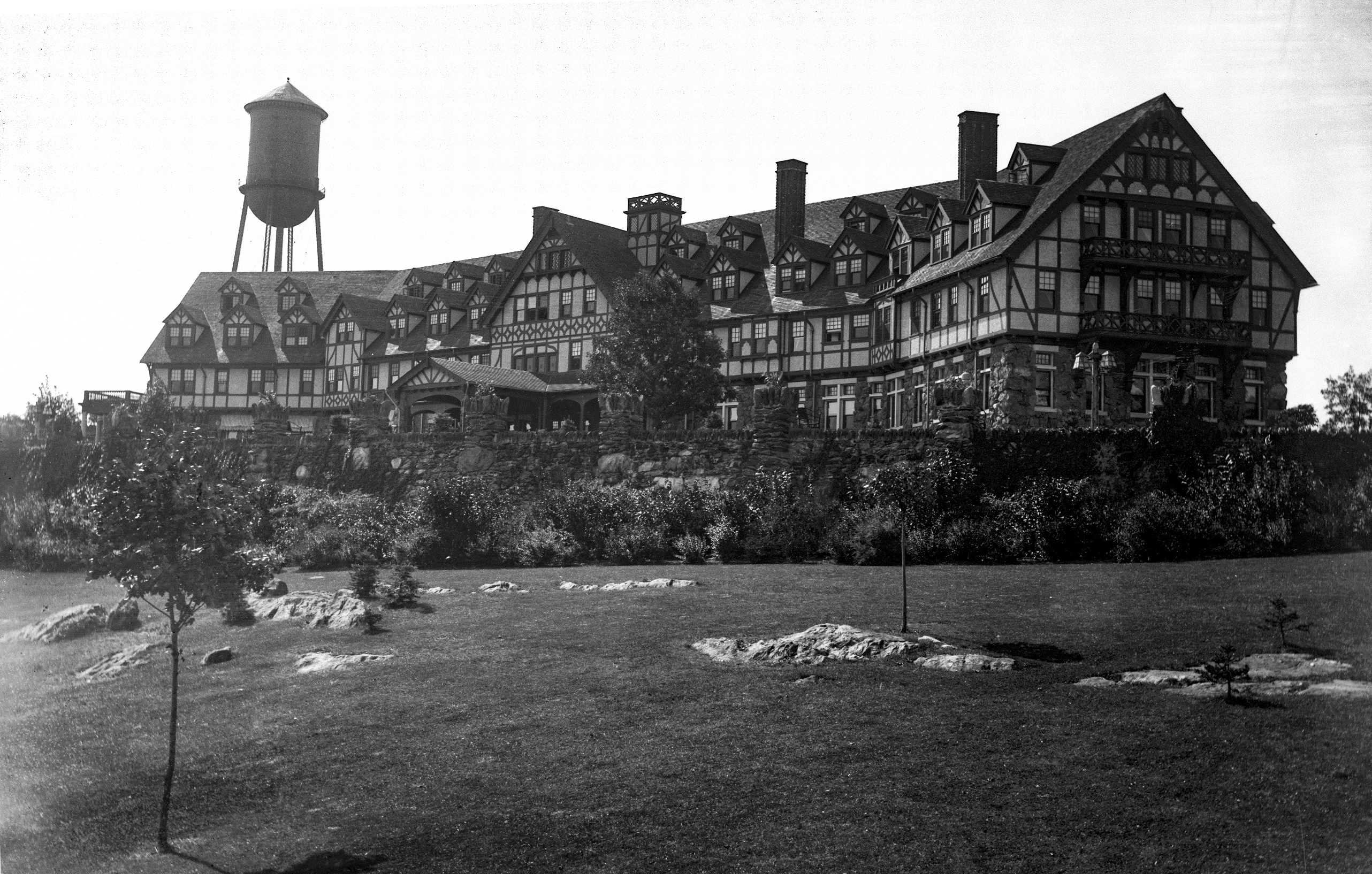
The Briarcliff Lodge, a Tudor Revival resort, c. 1904

At The Briarcliff Lodge
From Carmino Ravosa's Briarcliff show

- c. 1901–10: Walter Law establishes Briarcliff Farms, the Briarcliff Table Water Company and the Briarcliff Greenhouses.
- 1901: Briarcliff Steamer Company No. 1 is formed.
- 1902: Law has invested $2.5 million ($93 million in 2025) in the village by this time.
- 1902: A proposition is presented to the supervisors of Mount Pleasant and Ossining on October 8 for the incorporation of the Village of Briarcliff Manor. On November 21, the village is incorporated. At the time, Law owns all but two small parcels of the square mile village, and employs 100 of its residents.
- 1902: The Briarcliff Lodge opens.
- February 10, 1903: The Briarcliff Manor Fire Department is founded by Frederick C. Messinger from Briarcliff Steamer Company No. 1.
- 1903: Briarcliff College is founded at the Briarcliff Lodge.
- 1904: The first twenty-nine street lights, all electric, are installed.
- 1906: Walter Law replaces the village railroad station; Law's building currently houses part of the Briarcliff Manor Public Library.
- 1906: Scarborough is incorporated into Briarcliff Manor.
- 1906: Briarcliff Manor's first downtown stores are built.
- 1907: Law's Briarcliff Farms move to Pine Plains, New York, and Law begins developing Briarcliff Manor more as a municipal corporation.

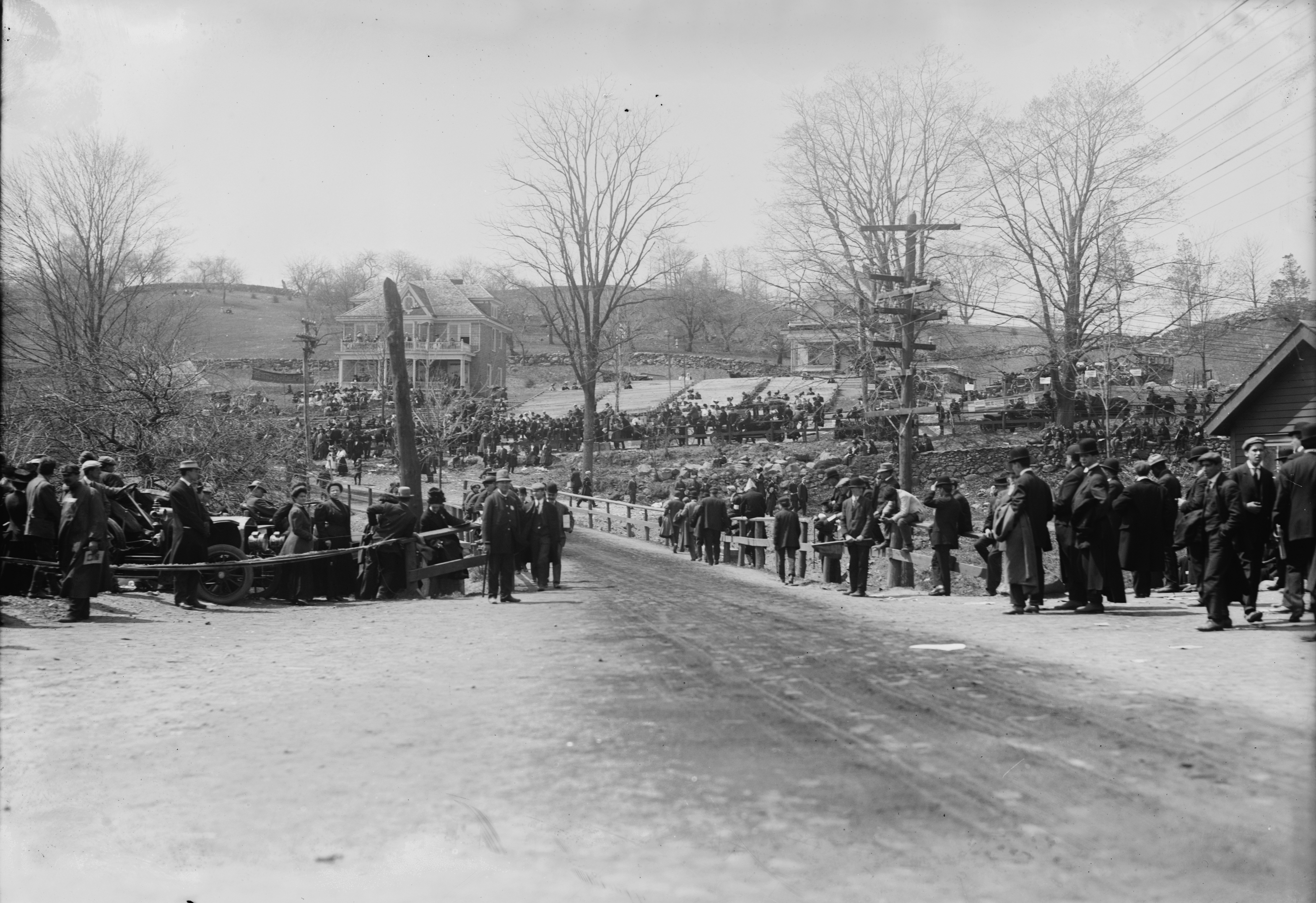
The First American International Road Race, 1908

- April 24, 1908: Briarcliff Manor sponsors the First American International Road Race; the event centered around the village, and more than 300,000 people watch the race; the village has more than 100,000 visitors that day.
- 1908: The village police department is organized and The Church House, the parish house of the Scarborough Presbyterian Church, is completed.
- 1909: Walter Law forms the Briarcliff Realty Company to sell Briarcliff Farms' original property in the village.
- 1910: The Briarcliff Community Center, nicknamed "The Club", is established in the 1898 Briarcliff Schools building.
- May 11, 1911: Sleepy Hollow Country Club is founded in Scarborough, Elliott Fitch Shepard's home "Woodlea" is purchased for its clubhouse.
- 1912: Walter Law's School of Practical Agriculture building burns down.
- 1913: The Village Municipal Building is built at a cost of $20,000 ($651,500 in 2025); it is opened on July 4, 1914.
- 1914: The village library, originally in the Briarcliff Community Center, is founded.
- 1914–18 (World War I): 91 Briarcliff Manor residents serve in the U.S. armed forces.
- 1917: The first village Girl Scout troop is founded by Louise Miller and Mrs. Alfred Jones.
- 1925: V. Everit Macy donates 265 acres (107 ha) to the Girl Scouts of the USA, which later becomes the Edith Macy Conference Center.
- 1926: St. Theresa's Catholic Church is founded with thirty-six families; the present church is dedicated two years later.
- 1927: Briarcliff's school building is demolished to make way for the Briarcliff–Peekskill Parkway.
- 1928: The high school opens, and a section is added to the 1909 school building.

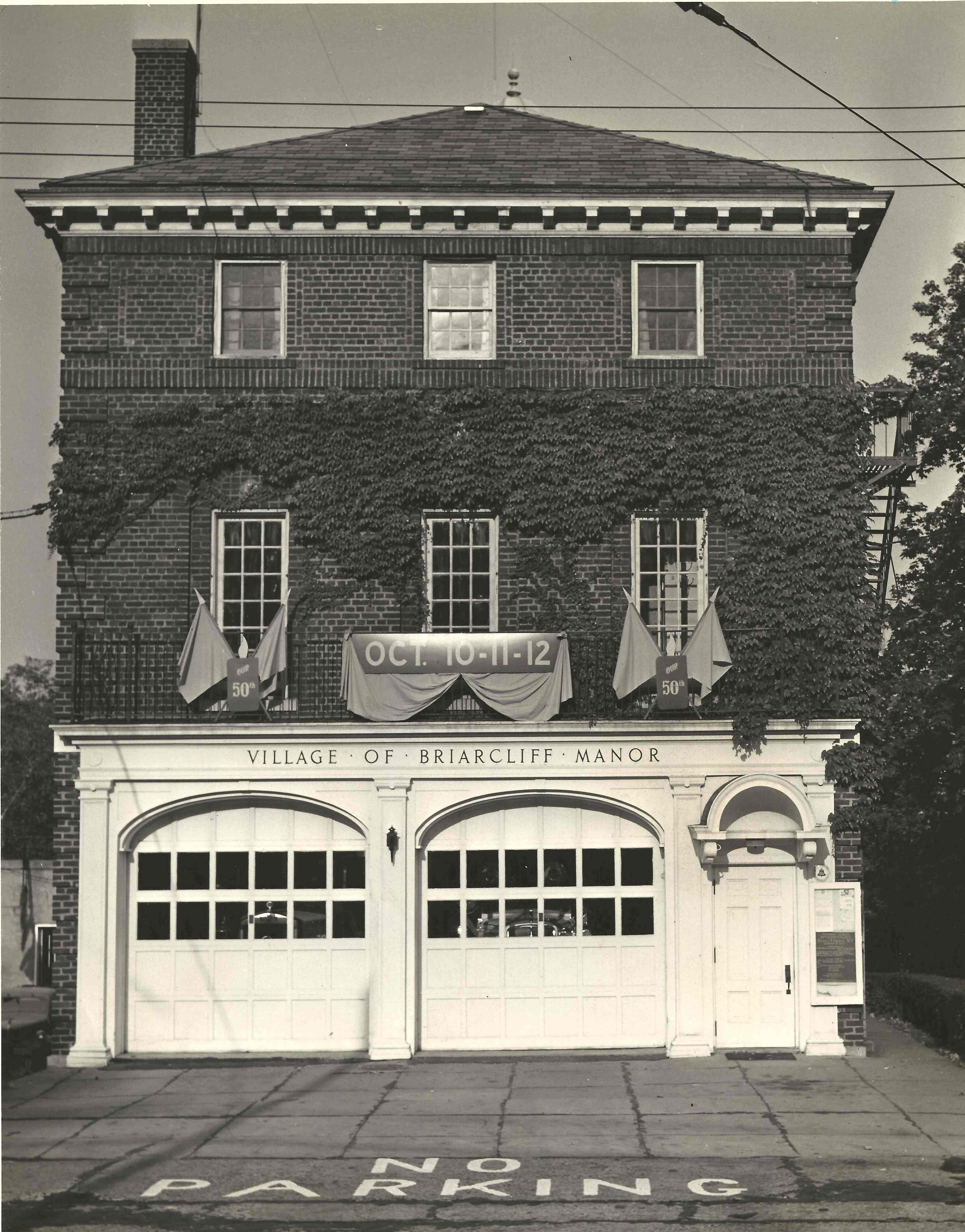
Village Municipal Building decorated for the village semicentennial, 1952

- 1930: V. Everit Macy creates Chilmark Park, a 250 acres (100 ha) community in Briarcliff.
- 1934: A 100-mile race in the village is sponsored by the Automobile Racing Club of America.
- 1935: Briarcliff's road race is held again.
- 1936–1954: The Briarcliff Lodge houses the Edgewood Park School.
- 1941–45 (World War II): More than 340 of the village's 1,830 residents Briarcliff Manor residents serve in the U.S. armed forces.
- 1946: The People's Caucus, an organization which calls out interested residents for candidacy, is created.
- 1950–53 (Korean War): Approximately 30 Briarcliff Manor residents serve in the U.S. armed forces.
- October 10, 1952 – October 12, 1952: Briarcliff Manor celebrates its semicentennial celebration, publishing a book about the village and its history.
- 1952: The Crossroads neighborhood of 84 houses is completed.
- 1953: Todd Elementary School opens to free space at the Law Park grade school for middle- and high-school students.
- 1955–1994: The Briarcliff Lodge houses The King's College.
- 1958: The Briarcliff Manor train station, along with the Putnam Division, is shut down.
- 1959: The Briarcliff Manor Public Library reopens in the former train station.
- 1959: Faith Lutheran Brethren Church is founded in Scarsdale.

The Briarcliff Manor Public Library, 1990s

- 1960s: The Municipal Building's cupola bell, which had tolled at the end of the World Wars, is moved to the front of the new firehouse.
- 1960: The village's first corporate facility (part of Philips Laboratory) opens.
- 1964: The new Village Hall opens, replacing the Municipal Building.
- 1965–72 (Vietnam War): At least five men serve in the U.S. armed forces, with four killed and another wounded.
- 1971: The present Briarcliff High School opens to ease the large enrollment at the grade-school building.
- 1974: A permanent firehouse is built in Scarborough; it is replaced with a larger station in 2009.
- 1974: The Briarcliff Manor-Scarborough Historical Society is founded from the village's 75th anniversary committee.
- April 1977: Pace University purchases Briarcliff College as a satellite of the school's Pleasantville campus.
- 1978: The Scarborough School closes; it reopens in 1981 as The Clear View School.
- 1980: The Chilmark Club becomes a part of the village's Parks and Recreation Department; Pace University begins leasing the middle school building, and the middle school is moved to a portion of the new high-school building.
- 1981: Rotary International founds a local chapter in the village.
- 1984: The Scarborough Historic District is added to the State and National Historic Registers.
- February 1990: Rosemont, a Scarborough Historic District property, is demolished.
- 1996: The grade-school building is demolished, and senior housing is built on its site the following year.
- 1998: The high school auditorium opens.
- September 16, 1999: The Beech Hill Road bridge is destroyed by the rising Pocantico River during Hurricane Floyd.
- 2000: The pool house in Law Memorial Park is demolished; construction on a new facility begins shortly after.

== 21st century ==
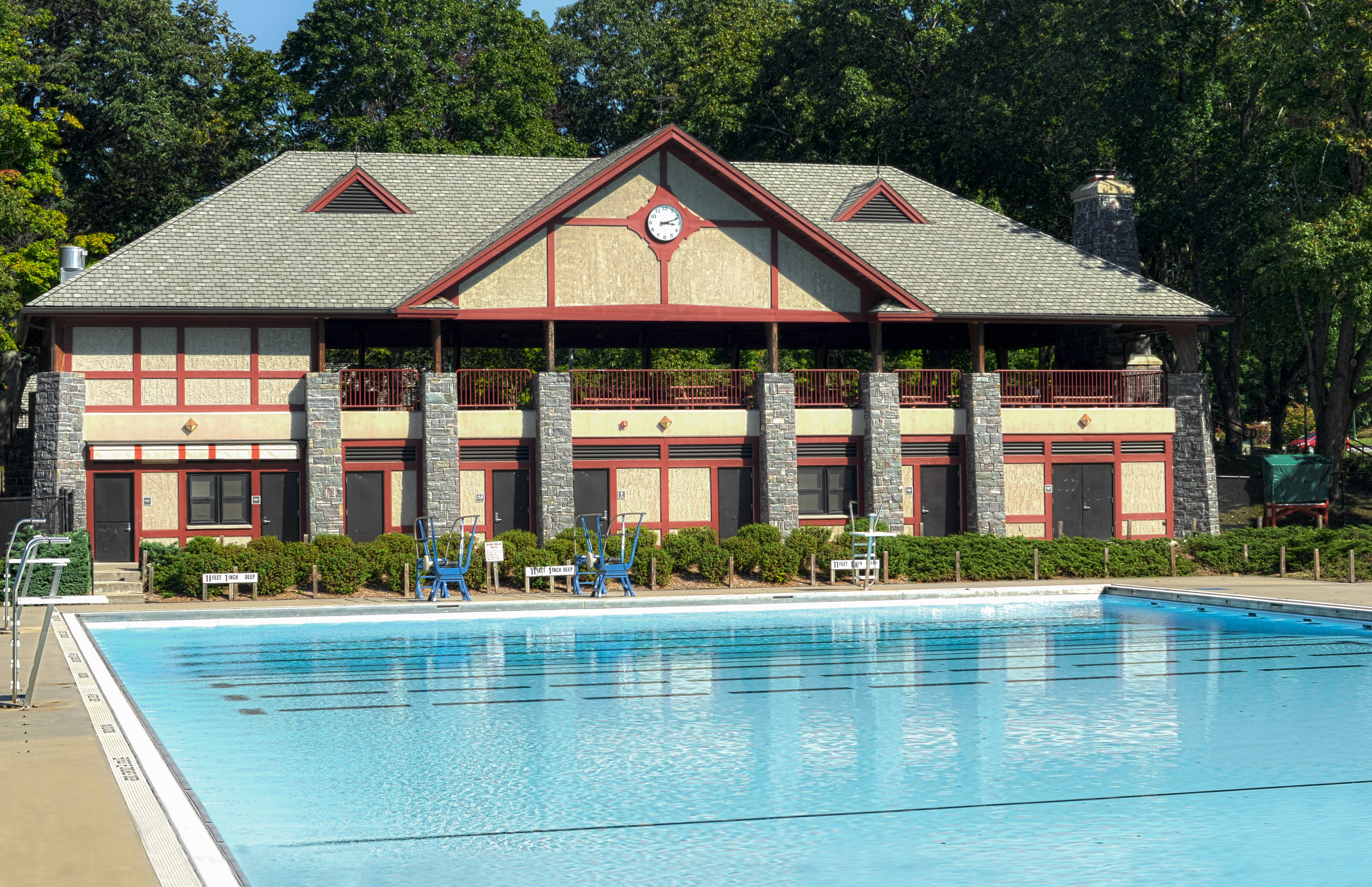
Law Park's pool pavilion, April 2014

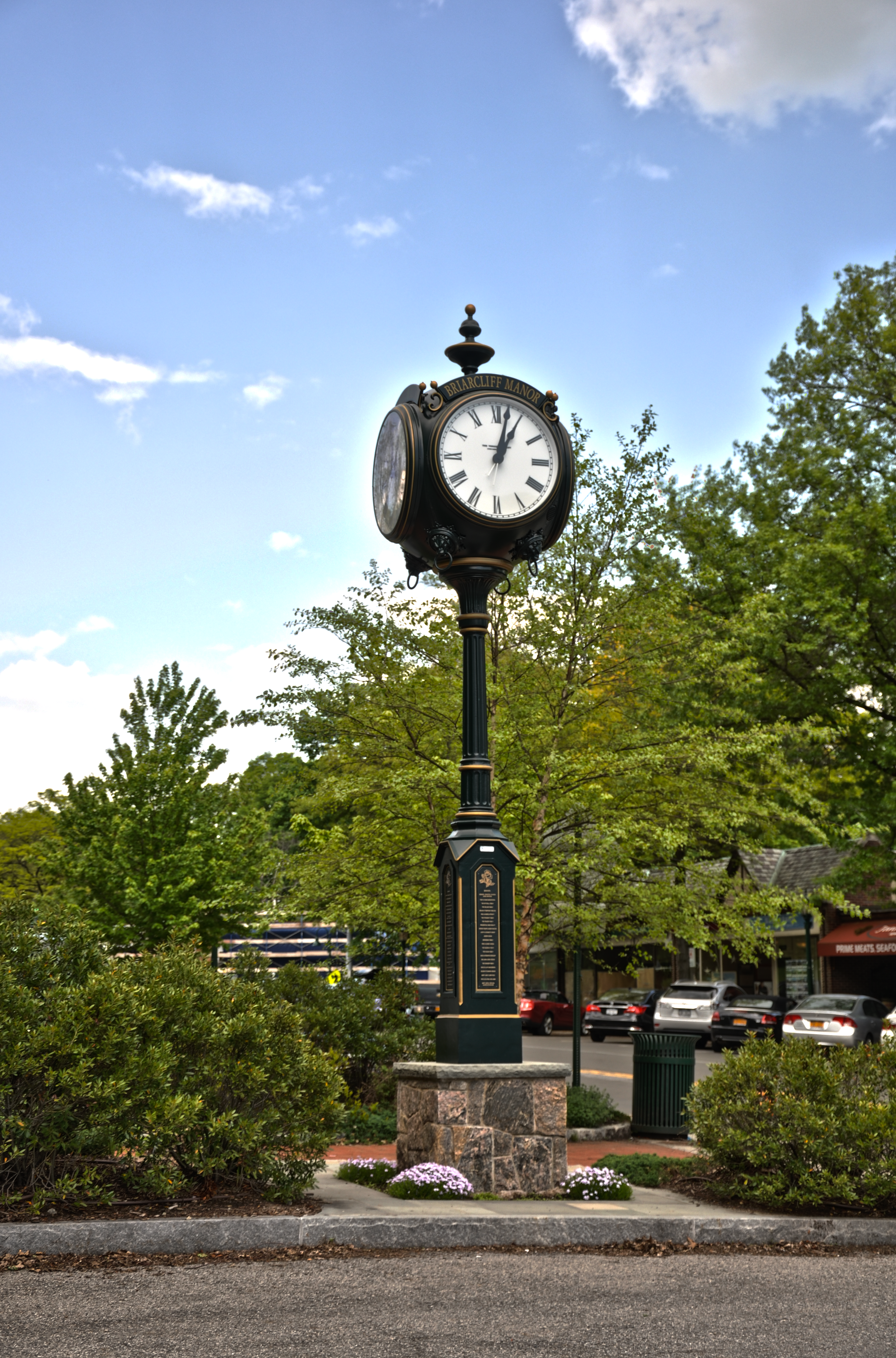
The village's clock and pocket park were dedicated in May 2009.

- November 2001: A $4-million rehabilitation ($7.27 million in 2025) of Law Park is completed, with a new pavilion and pool house, paved walkways, lights and benches, a redesigned and filtered pond, and relocation of the Veterans Memorial. Over 300 people attend the Veterans Day rededication ceremony.
- 2002: The village celebrates its centennial, which involves numerous celebratory events.
- 2002: Ambient Corporation and Consolidated Edison install an experimental broadband over power lines (BPL) system in Briarcliff Manor; the system is now defunct.
- 2003: The present Briarcliff Middle School building is completed at a cost of $24 million ($42 million in 2025).
- September 20, 2003: The original 1902 Briarcliff Lodge building burns to the ground, and contemporary portions of the lodge and other campus buildings are later demolished.
- 2006: The village government installs new street signs featuring the Briarcliff Rose.
- 2007: In the summer, construction of a 6,600-square-foot (610 m^{2}) addition to the Briarcliff Manor Public Library begins; the facility is opened for use on February 19, 2009.
- 2008–2012: Briarcliff Manor hosts a weekly indoor farmers' market, first at the Briarcliff Congregational Church's parish house; it moves to Pace University's Briarcliff Campus in 2012.
- March 21, 2010: The Briarcliff Manor-Scarborough Historical Society is given its first permanent location at the Eileen O'Connor Weber Historical Center, established as part of the expanded Briarcliff Manor Public Library.
- 2011: Hurricane Irene causes a sinkhole, of about 20 feet in diameter, to form on North State Road near Route 9A; New York's department of transportation spends about $900,000 repairing the damage.
- 2011–2015: The village becomes involved in an annexation proposal with the town of Ossining for Briarcliff Manor to annex land on which 1,600 people live. After debate and public hearings, the village government decides to end its pursuit of the annexation in May 2015.
- July 5, 2015: Saint Mary's Episcopal Church closes after 175 years in operation.
- December 12, 2015: The Law Park pavilion is damaged in a large fire; around 100 firefighters in multiple departments assist to put out the fire that night.
- May 30, 2016: Briarcliff Manor's original station building was reopened as the William J. Vescio Community Center. Mayor Lori Sullivan and former mayor William J. Vescio presided over the center's opening and the dedication to Vescio. (Note: Vescio, a village resident since about 1973, served the village board for 29 years, including eleven as trustee and ten as mayor. Vescio oversaw construction of the library and community center, and of a new water supply system for the village.)
- May 29, 2017: The reconstructed Law Park pavilion is rededicated after the village's Memorial Day ceremony.

== See also ==
- History of Briarcliff Manor
- History of New York
