= Croton Falls =

Croton Falls may refer to:

- Croton Falls, New York, a hamlet in North Salem, New York, United States
- Croton Falls (Metro-North station), serving Croton Falls, New York
- Croton Falls Reservoir, in Putnam County, New York
