= Purdy's station =

Metro-North Railroad station in New York

Purdy's
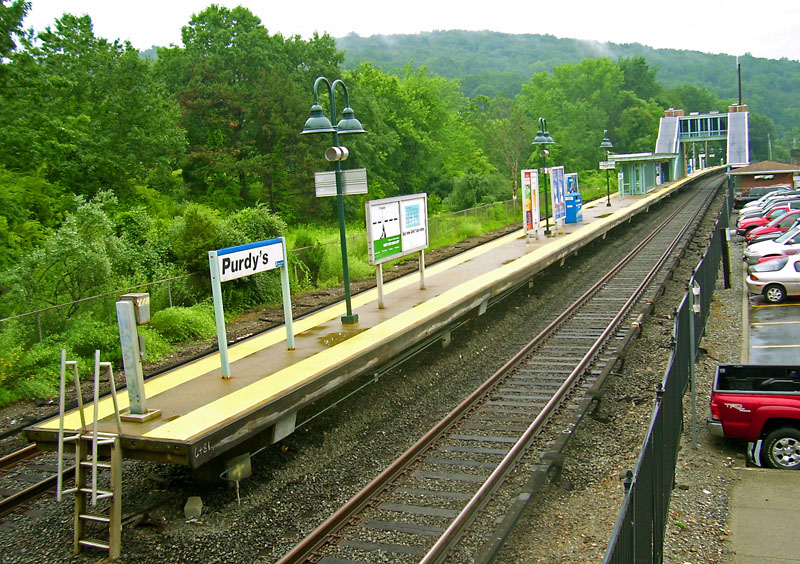
- Purdy's Metro-North station in July 2006.

General information
- Location: 85 Titicus Road, Purdys, New York
- Coordinates: 41.3256°N 73.6590°W
- Line: Harlem Line
- Platforms: 1 island platform
- Tracks: 2

Construction
- Parking: 400 spaces
- Accessible: yes

Other information
- Fare zone: 7

History
- Opened: June 1, 1847
- Electrified: 1984; 700V (DC) third rail

Passengers
- 2018: 492 (Metro-North)
- Rank: 74 of 109

Services
Preceding station	Metro-North Railroad	Following station
Goldens Bridge toward Grand Central	Harlem Line	Croton Falls toward Southeast or Wassaic

Former services
Preceding station	New York Central Railroad	Following station
Goldens Bridge toward New York	Harlem Division	Croton Falls toward Chatham
Location

Purdy's station is a commuter rail stop on the Metro-North Railroad's Harlem Line, located in North Salem, New York.

== History ==
In 1847, Issac Hart Purdy agreed to allow the New York and Harlem Railroad to build their main line through the community for one dollar upon the condition that they establish a station within the community for both passengers and freight. NY&H was acquired by New York Central and Hudson River Railroad in 1864. The decline of the railroads after World War II threatened the very survival of the station until a descendant of Purdy drove to New York City with a copy of the original contract in order to thwart a potential closing in 1955. At some point, a smaller station house was built along the southbound track which still survives to this day.

As with most of the Harlem Line, the merger of New York Central with Pennsylvania Railroad in 1968 transformed the station into a Penn Central Railroad station. Penn Central's continuous financial despair throughout the 1970s forced them to turn over their commuter service to the Metropolitan Transportation Authority which made it part of Metro-North in 1983.

Work on adding an elevator began in 2022 and was completed in 2024.

== Station layout ==
The station has one eight-car-long high-level island platform serving trains in both directions.

== Bibliography ==
- Dana, William B. (1866). The Merchants' Magazine and Commercial Review, Volume 55. New York, New York: William B. Dana.
