= History of Briarcliff Manor =

Past events in the New York village

Coordinates: 41.15°N 73.85°W

Historical boundaries of Briarcliff Manor

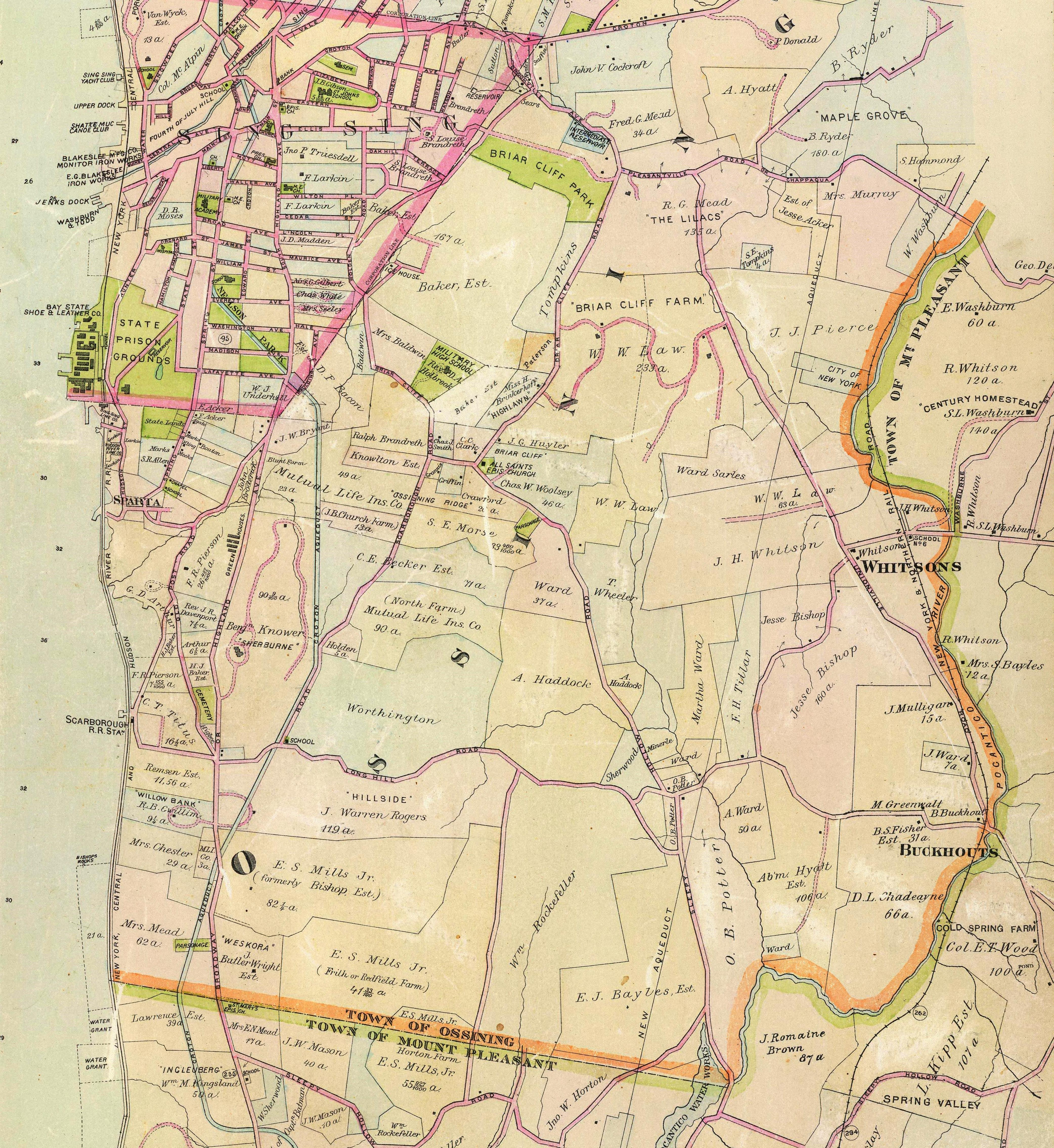
1891; prior to Briarcliff Manor's incorporation

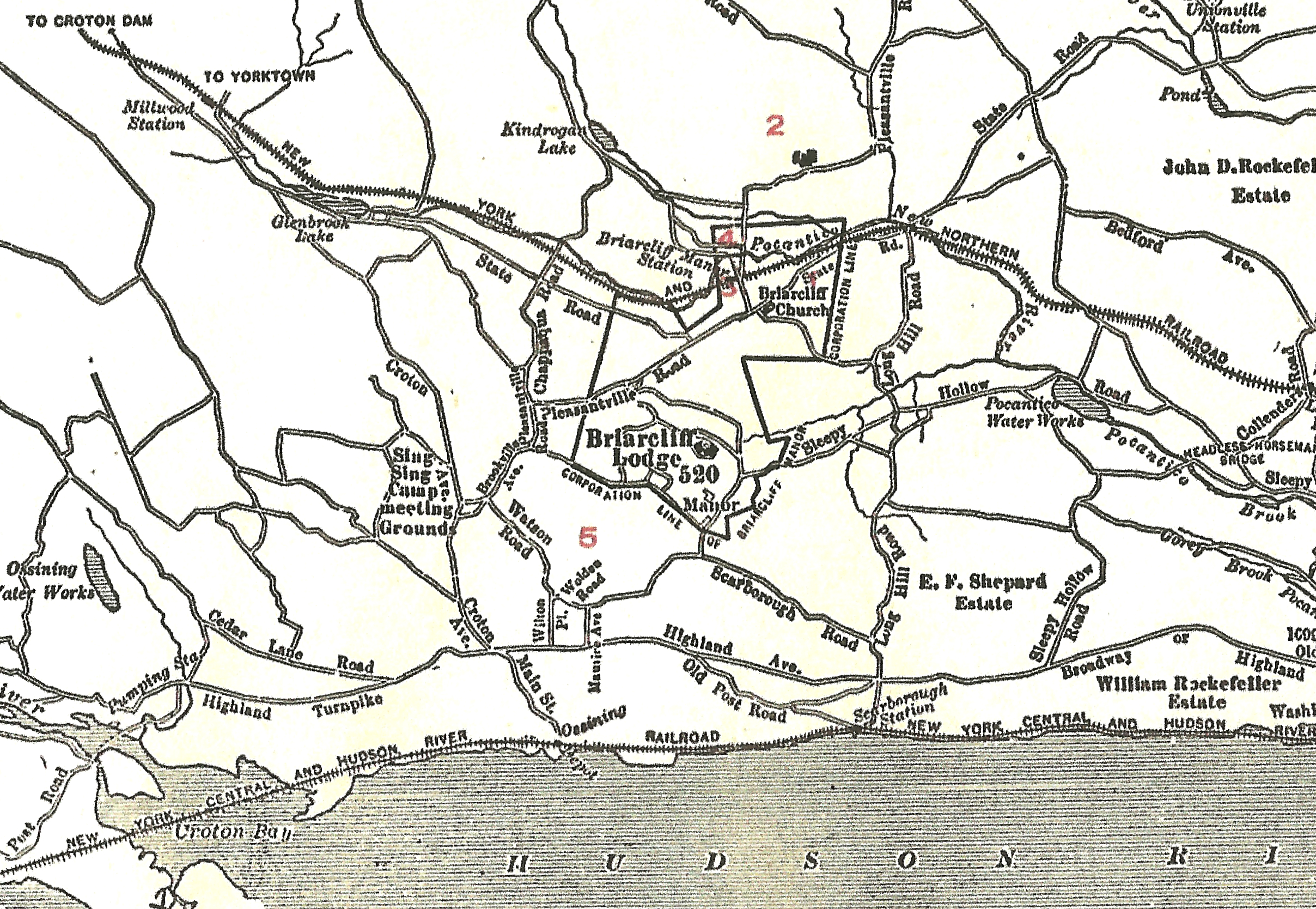
1906; prior to the 1906 Scarborough annexation

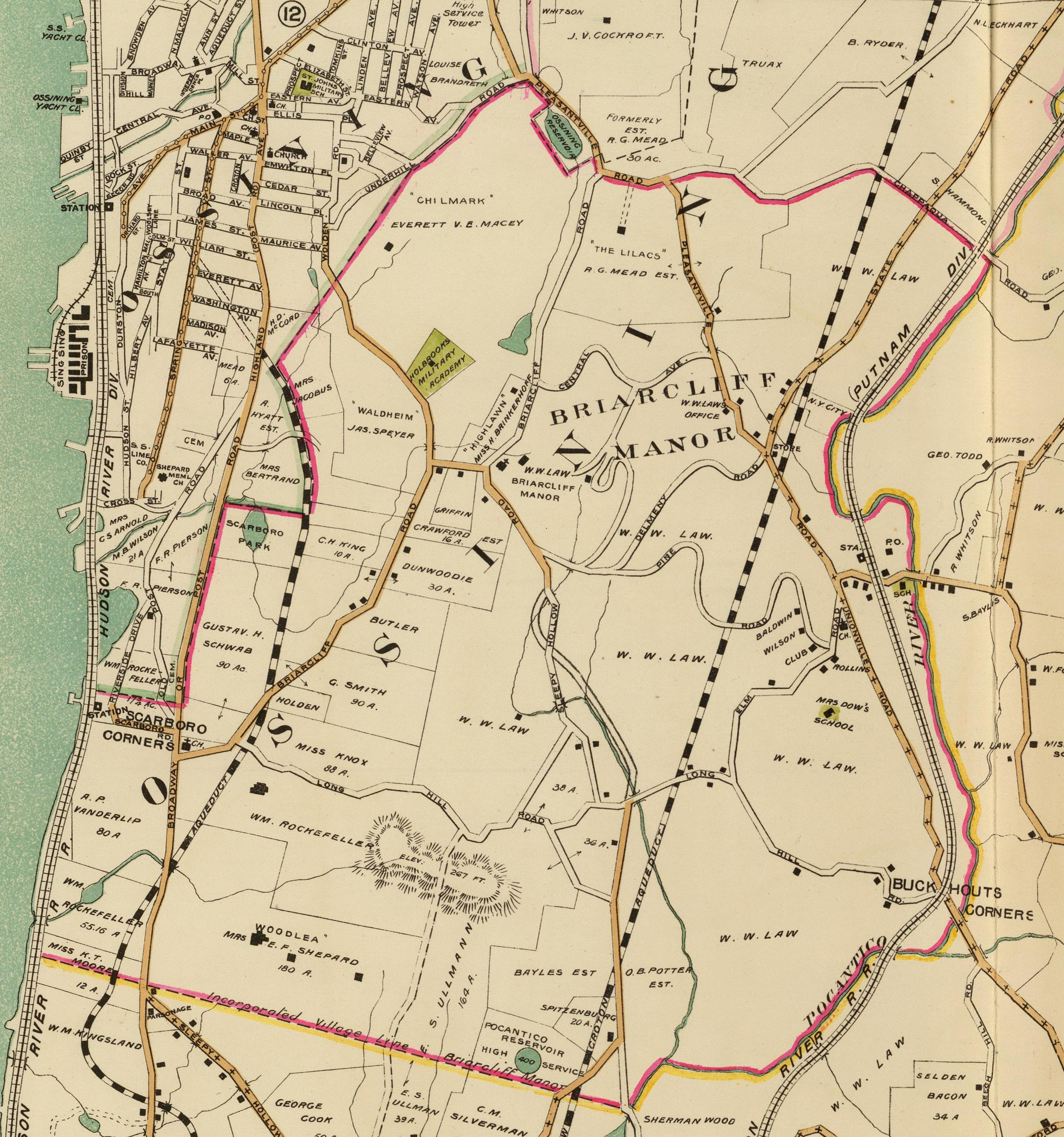
1908; prior to the 1927 Mt. Pleasant annexation

2014

The history of Briarcliff Manor, a village in the county of Westchester, New York, can be traced back to the founding of a settlement between the Hudson and Pocantico Rivers in the 19th century. The area now known as Briarcliff Manor had seen human occupation since at least the Archaic period, but significant growth in the settlements that are now incorporated into the village did not occur until the Industrial Revolution. The village, which was incorporated with one square mile in 1902, has expanded primarily through annexation: of Scarborough in 1906 and from the town of Mount Pleasant in 1927.

Early leaders of village government include President William de Nyse Nichols from 1902 to 1905, President Walter W. Law, Jr. from 1905 to 1918, President-Mayor Henry H. Law from 1918 until his death in 1936, and Mayor J. Henry Ingham from 1936 to 1941.

== Prehistory ==
Briarcliff Manor has been inhabited by humans since the Archaic period, as Louis Brennan and other archaeologists discovered in the Scarborough neighborhood during the 1960s and 1970s. They found and dated oyster shells, stone tools and slings (most to the Archaic period of 8000 to 1000 BC). In the precolonial era, the area of present-day Briarcliff Manor was inhabited by a band of the Wappinger tribes of Native Americans known as Sint Sincks (or "Sing Sings"). The tribe spoke coastal Munsee and called themselves Lenape ("the People"). They owned territory as far north as the Croton River; the Wappingers held land as far north as the Roeliff Jansen Kill, their boundary with the Mahican tribe.

== Early history ==
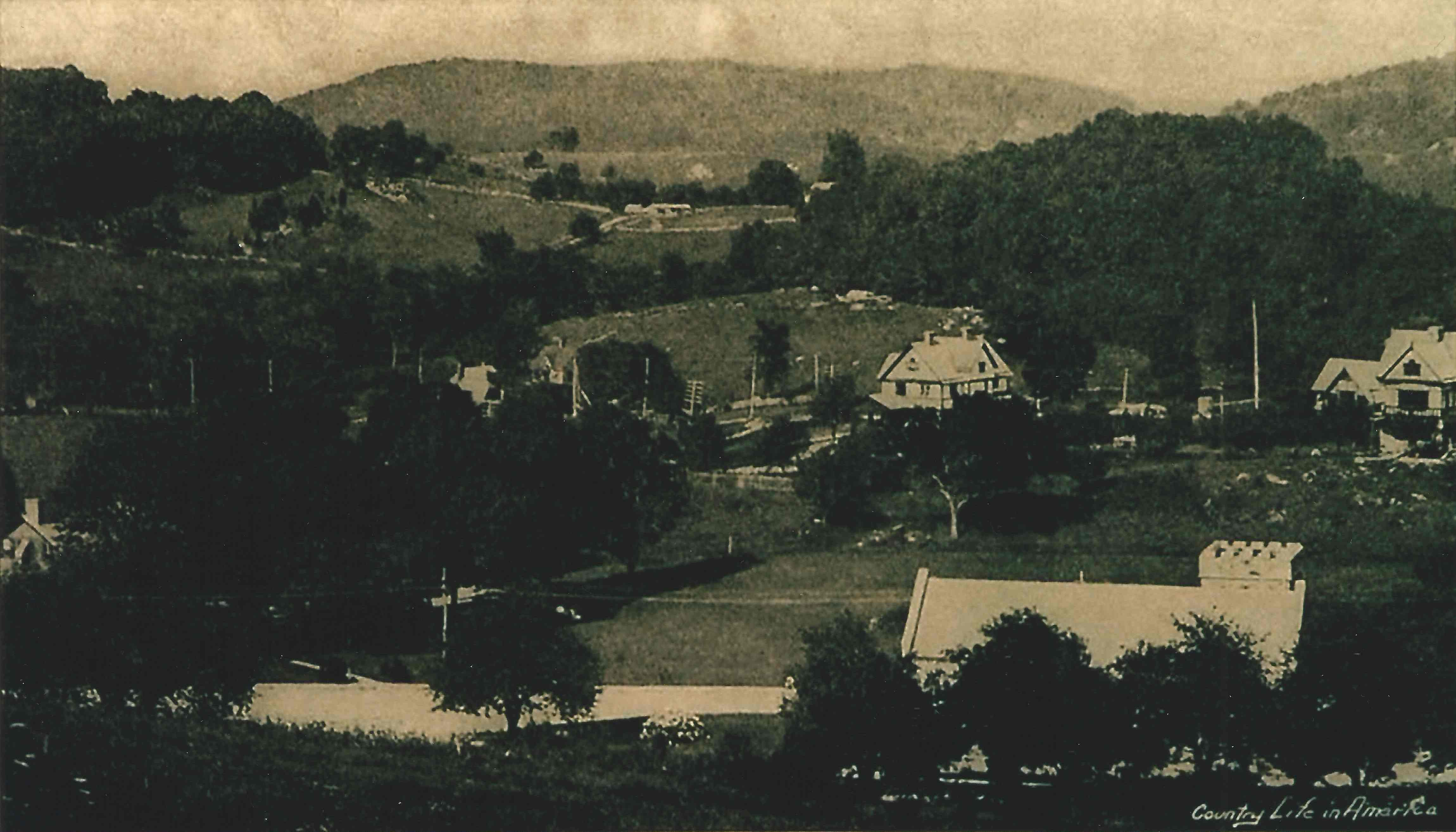
Part of Briarcliff Manor from Pine Hill c. 1900; Briarcliff Congregational Church (foreground) and Dysart House (background) (Note: Dysart House was home to Arthur Ware (architect and brother to Franklin B. Ware) and his family. It was built in 1897 by Walter Law as a guest house after Dysart House in Scotland, and remains a private residence today.)

In 1680, Frederick Philipse purchased the Ossining area from Indian sachem Ghoharius with the consent of his brother Weskora. Weskora became the name of the Hudson River hamlet which was renamed Scarborough in 1864. On August 4, 1685, Philipse purchased about 156,000 acres (244 sq mi) from the Sint Sincks, extending from Spuyten Duyvil Creek along the Hudson River to the Croton River, adding it to his Philipsburg Manor. In 1765, the Wappingers unsuccessfully attempted to sue the Philipse family for control of the land; their claim died out after around fifty tribespeople, organized into the Stockbridge Militia under Abraham Nimham and his father Daniel Nimham, were killed by British forces in the Battle of Kingsbridge during the American Revolutionary War. The Philipses also lost their claim to the land because of the war; the family, which was Loyalist, had its property confiscated by the New York State Commission on Forfeiture in 1779 and it was sold in 1784–85. The area remained largely unsettled until after the Revolution; in 1693, fewer than twenty families lived in the 50,000-acre (78 sq mi) area of Westchester including what is now Briarcliff Manor. It became known as Whitson's Corners for brothers John H., Richard and Reuben Whitson, who owned adjoining farms totaling 400 acres (0.63 sq mi) in the area. In 1865, a one-room schoolhouse was built on land donated by John Whitson. The building (Whitson's Schoolhouse, District No. 6) became the first schoolhouse and church in the area and George A. Todd, Jr. was the first teacher and superintendent of the school. In 1880 the Whitson's Corners station was added to the New York City & Northern Railroad train schedule, and the first train arrived on December 13. A post office was established a year later; it was renamed the Briarcliff Manor Post Office in 1897.

== Progressive Era ==
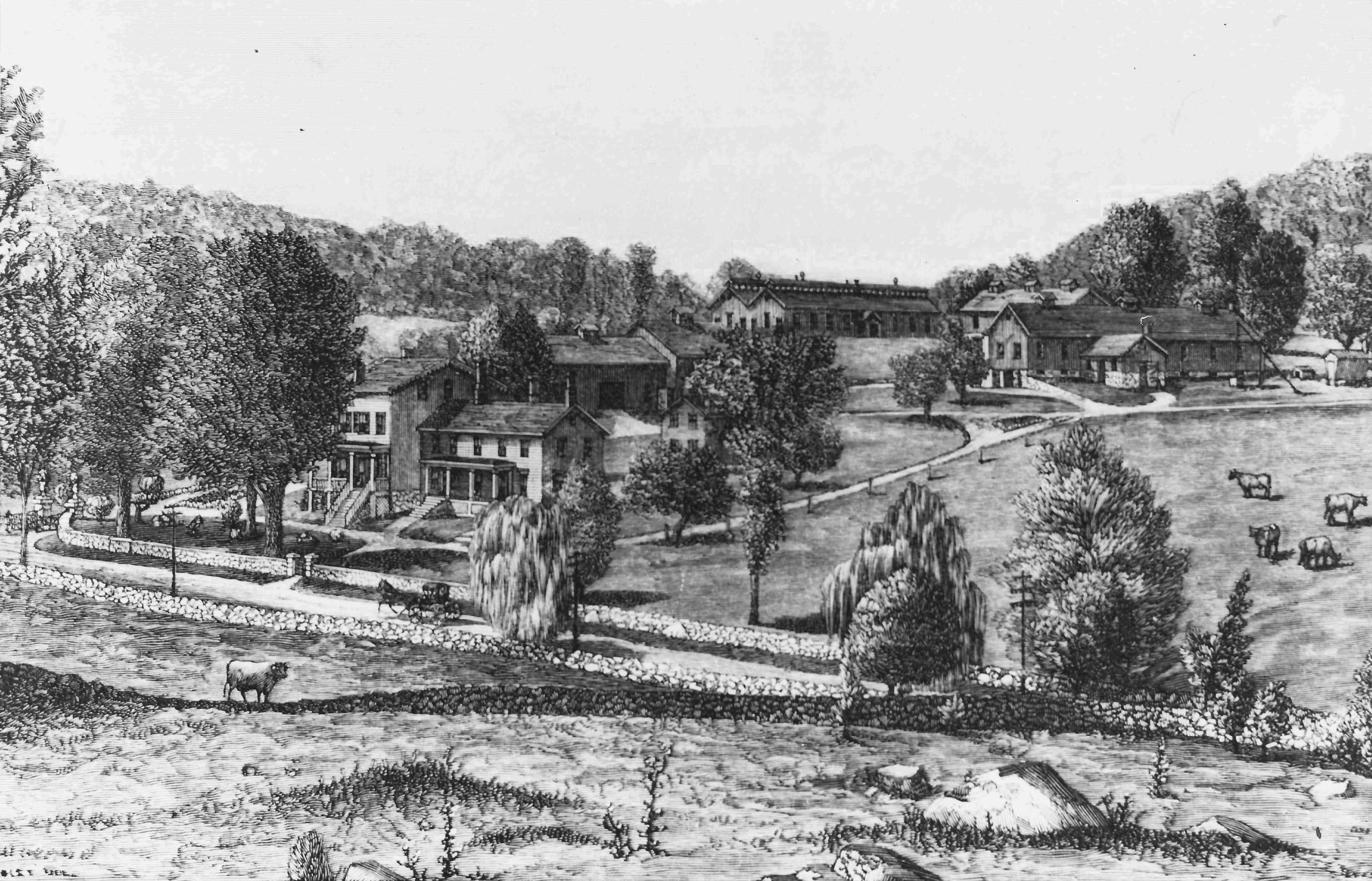
Illustration of James Stillman's Briarcliff Farm c. 1886. (Note: Part of the farmhouse currently survives as the rectory of St. Theresa's Catholic Church.)

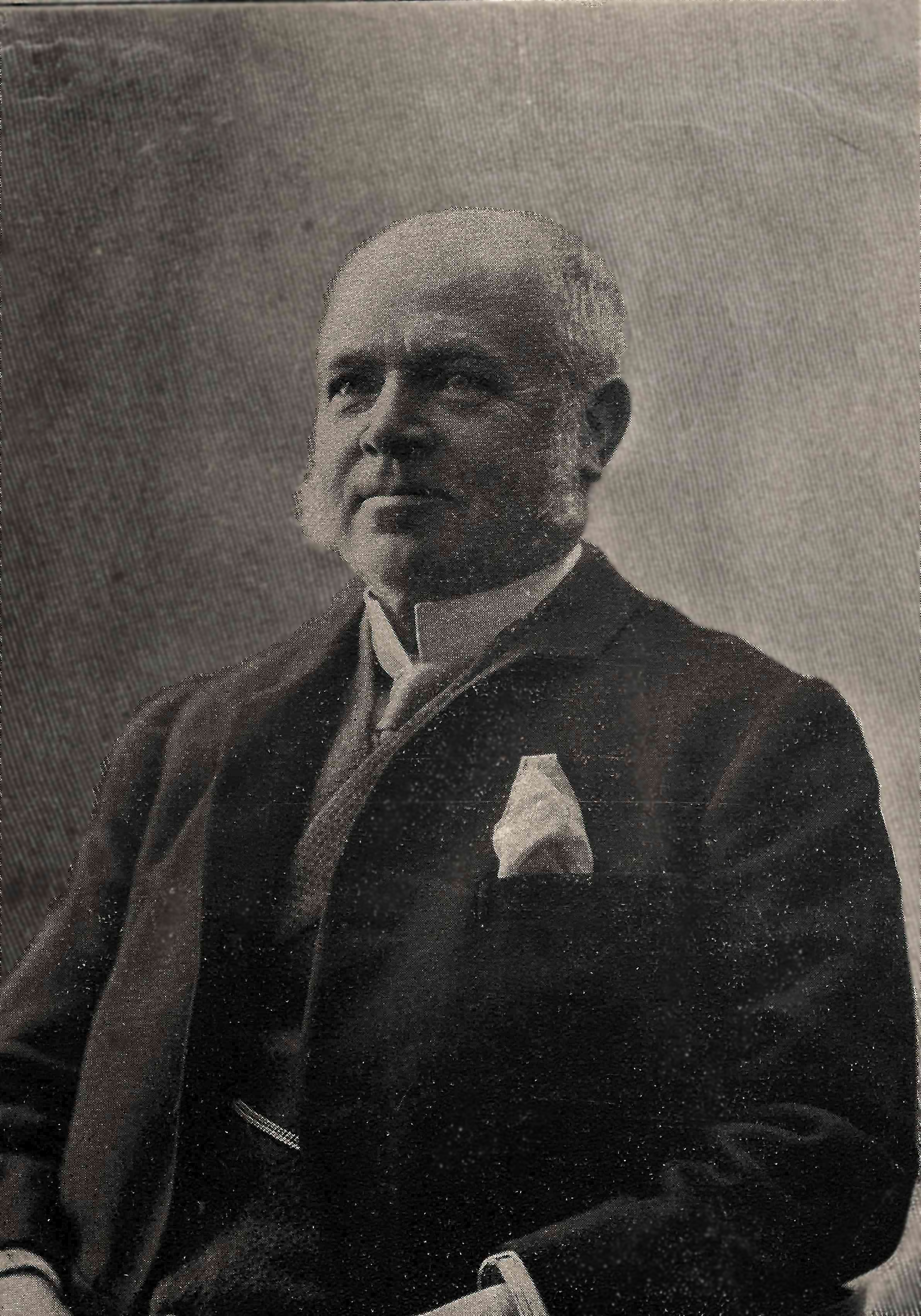
Walter Law, founder of Briarcliff Manor

After retiring as vice president of W. & J. Sloane, Walter Law moved with his family to the present Briarcliff Manor. He bought his first 236 acres (0.4 sq mi) with the James Stillman farm for $35,000 ($1,254,200 in 2025) in 1890. Law rapidly added to his property, buying about forty parcels in less than ten years; by 1900, he owned more than 5,000 acres (7.8 sq mi) of Westchester County, and became the largest individual landholder in the county. In 1892, Elliott Fitch Shepard began construction of Woodlea, a mansion in Scarborough. He ordered the construction of Scarborough's first dock (at the present Scarborough Park) to allow construction materials to be shipped to his property. The village later purchased the dock (along with about 8 acres of under-water land), and used it as a public dock, and for receiving stone, coal, and building materials.

In the 1890s, Walter Law established Briarcliff Farms, a large holding of Jersey dairy cattle. At its zenith, Law had 500 workers caring for more than 1,000 cattle, 500 pigs, 4,000 chickens, Thoroughbred horses, pheasants, peacocks and sheep. Around the same time, he established the Briarcliff Table Water Company and the Briarcliff Greenhouses. The water company sold its products in five cities and had 250-foot (76 m) wells. Briarcliff Farms was one of the first producers of certified milk in the U.S., and Law's Jerseys produced about 4,500 US quarts (4,300 litres) of milk daily. As many as 8,000 roses were shipped from Briarcliff Greenhouses daily, most to New York City.

Law developed the village, establishing schools, churches, parks and the Briarcliff Lodge. He established the School of Practical Agriculture in 1900 on Pleasantville Road on 66 acres (0.1 sq mi), and had invested $2.5 million ($93 million in 2025) in the village by 1902. His employees at Briarcliff Farms moved into the village, and Law held some of their mortgages. At the time, New York State required a population density of at least 300 per square mile as the first step towards incorporation as a village. A proposition was presented to the supervisors of Mount Pleasant and Ossining on October 8, 1902, that the area of 640 acres (1 sq mi) with a population of 331 be incorporated as the Village of Briarcliff Manor, and the village was incorporated on November 21. At the time, Law owned all but two small parcels of the square mile village, and employed 100 of its residents.

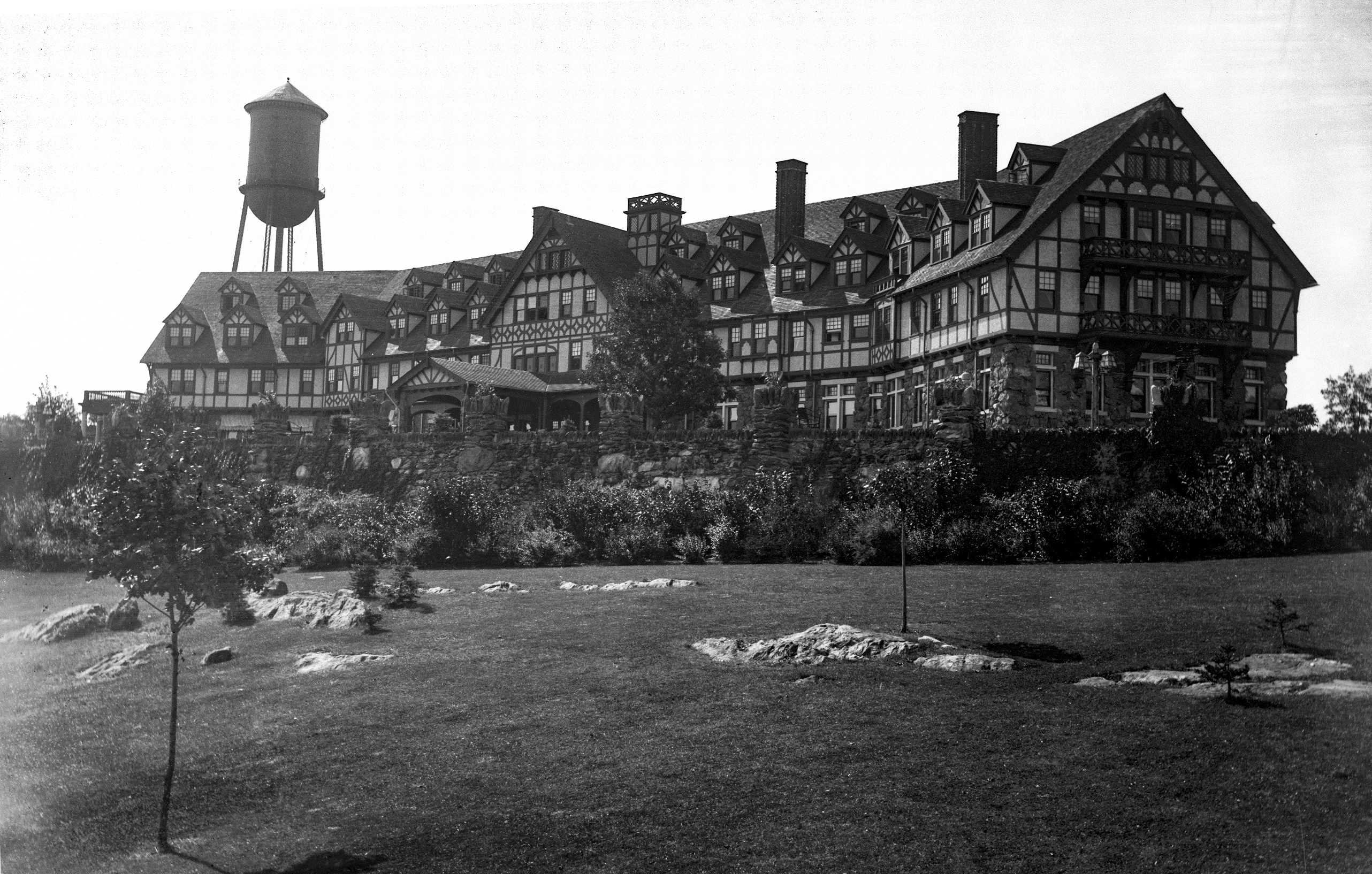
The Briarcliff Lodge, a Tudor Revival resort (c. 1904)

At its 1902 opening, the Briarcliff Lodge was a premier resort hotel. The Tudor Revival-style building was surrounded by dairy barns and greenhouses (built by Law), and hosted numerous distinguished guests, including Franklin and Eleanor Roosevelt. The hotel declined during the 1930s but the lodge remained in use, housing the Edgewood Park School (1936–1954) and The King's College (1955–1994). The original 1902 Briarcliff Lodge building burned to the ground on September 20, 2003, and contemporary portions of the lodge and other campus buildings were later demolished.

In 1903, Mrs. Dow's School for Girls was founded at the Briarcliff Lodge; two years later, Walter Law gave Mary Elizabeth Dow 35 acres (0.05 sq mi) and built the Châteauesque Dow Hall; the school later became known as Briarcliff College. Also established in 1903, the Briarcliff Manor Fire Department was founded on February 10 by Frederick C. Messinger from Briarcliff Manor's first fire company, the 1901 Briarcliff Steamer Company No. 1. The department's first fire engine was white, which Messinger thought more visible than the conventional red in a village without street lights, and the village's engines remain white. The first twenty-nine street lights, all electric, were installed in 1904, and Scarborough was incorporated into Briarcliff Manor in 1906. Law largely developed his land as a business corporation until 1907, when Briarcliff Farms moved to Pine Plains, New York, and Law began developing Briarcliff Manor as a municipal corporation instead.

The Briarcliff Race
From Carmino Ravosa's Briarcliff show

In 1908, Briarcliff Manor sponsored the First American International Road Race; the event centered around the village, and more than 300,000 people watched the race; the village had more than 100,000 visitors that day. The race was held again in 1934 and 1935. Also in 1908, the village police department was organized and The Church House—parish house of the Scarborough Presbyterian Church—was completed. The Briarcliff Community Center, nicknamed "The Club", (Note: The nickname survives with The Club at Briarcliff Manor, an organization planning a senior living center at the Briarcliff Lodge property.) was a social organization established by the village in 1910 in the 1898 Briarcliff Schools building. The Club became a social and recreational center, hosting dinners, dances, and variety shows, and containing a gymnasium and library. The organization ceased to exist in 1927; the building burned down in 1928, shortly after scheduled demolition to make way for the Briarcliff–Peekskill Parkway. Sleepy Hollow Country Club was founded on May 11, 1911, in Scarborough, at the former house of Colonel Elliott Fitch Shepard. The Village Municipal Building was built in 1913 at a cost of $20,000 ($651,500 in 2025), and was opened on July 4, 1914. Currently housing several businesses, during the 1960s its cupola bell, which had tolled at the end of the World Wars, was moved to the front of the new firehouse. In 1914, the Briarcliff Community Center created the library which eventually became the Briarcliff Manor Public Library.

=== World War I ===
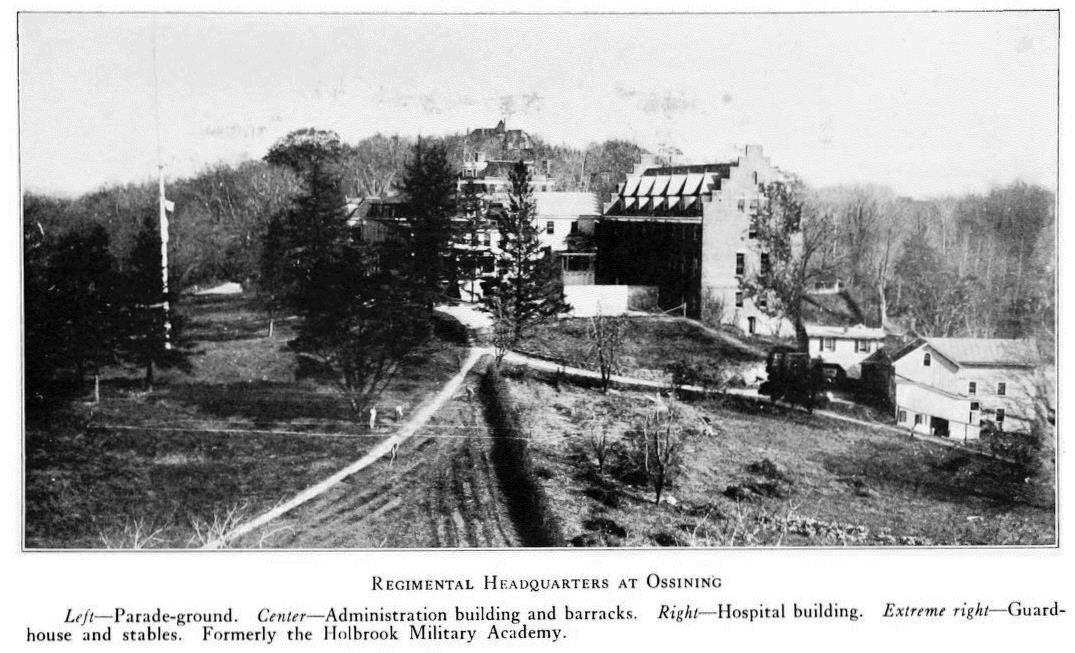
The former Holbrook Military Academy as the First Provisional Regiment headquarters

During World War I, 91 Briarcliff Manor residents served in the United States Armed Forces. Briarcliff Manor was directly involved in the First World War in a number of ways: the New York Guard's First Provisional Regiment (1,500 men operating under Colonel John B. Rose) was ordered to guard the Croton Aqueduct; Briarcliff Manor resident V. Everit Macy granted free use of Briarcliff Manor's former Holbrook Military Academy campus and buildings for the troops, initially arranged between him and the regiment's chaplain Captain Charles W. Baldwin (rector of Saint Mary's Episcopal Church in Scarborough). The regiment was headquartered at the site from late 1918 to mid 1919, and the school's academic building was used as Field Hospital No. 2 of the Atlantic Division of the American Red Cross. During that time, Scarborough resident James Speyer led the Aqueduct Guard Citizens' Committee to assist the regiment; among those in the committee were Briarcliff Manor-Scarborough residents Frank and Narcissa Vanderlip and V. Everit Macy, and the founder of Briarcliff Manor and his wife, Walter and Georgianna Law. On Michaelmas in 1918, the regiment attended a service at Saint Mary's; in May of that year, the regiment participated in a "Fete de Mai" hosted by Sleepy Hollow Country Club in Scarborough for the American Red Cross' benefit. The Scarborough School participated in an unknown assistance for the troops and James Speyer's Scarborough home Waldheim was one of the primary meeting locations for his committee.

== Post-Progressive Era ==
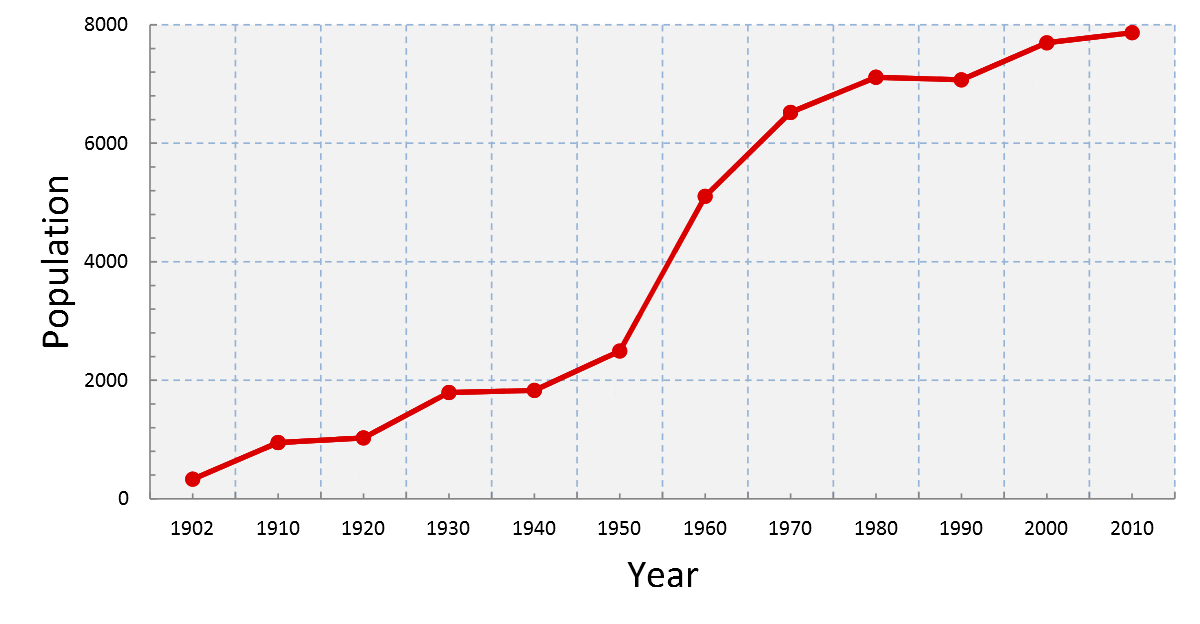
Population of Briarcliff Manor, 1902–2010

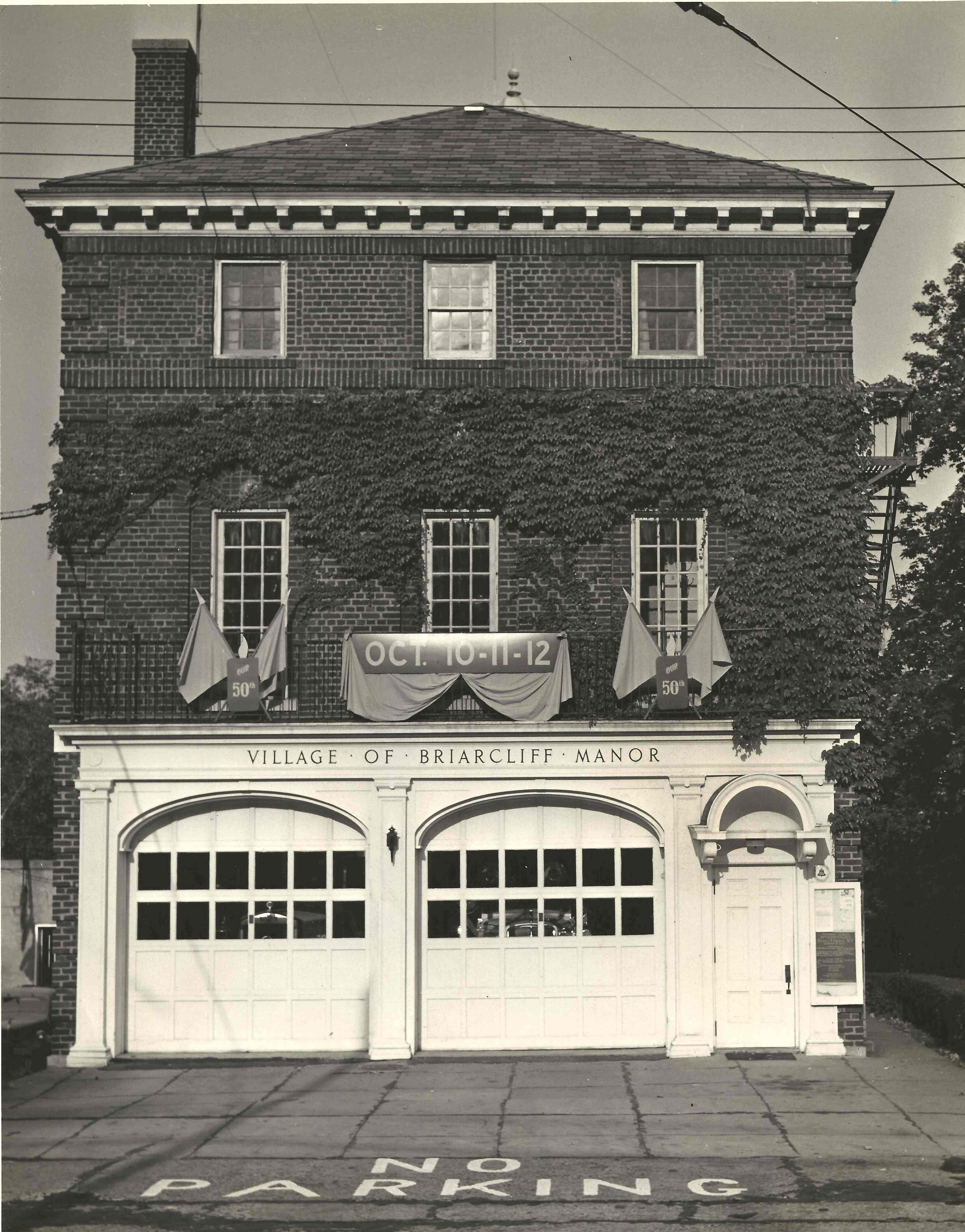
Village Municipal Building decorated for the village semicentennial

Briarcliff Manor's downtown and the Crossroads neighborhood, 1952

Walter Law died on January 18, 1924. V. Everit Macy donated 265 acres (0.4 sq mi) to the Girl Scouts of the USA in 1925, which later became the Edith Macy Conference Center. The high school opened in 1928, and a section was added to the 1909 school building. A 1934 100-mile race in the village was sponsored by the Automobile Racing Club of America. During World War II, more than 340 of the village's 1,830 residents served in the United States Armed Forces; eight streets in the village are named after residents who died in the war. Many of the village's firefighters (at least nine on active duty) left to fight during the war; so many that the village had to request volunteers ages 16–18 to join the Briarcliff Manor Fire Department. In May 1946, an honorary dinner event was held for the returned veterans. In the same year, the People's Caucus party, an organization which calls out interested residents for candidacy, was created.

Approximately 30 people from Briarcliff Manor served in the Korean War. John Kelvin Koelsch, who lived in Scarborough and attended the Scarborough School, died in a Korean prison camp after three months in captivity. Briarcliff Manor celebrated its semicentennial celebration from October 10–12, 1952, publishing a book about the village and its history; that year, the Crossroads neighborhood of 84 houses was completed. In 1953, Todd Elementary School opened to free space at the Law Park grade school for middle- and high-school students. The Putnam Division was discontinued in 1958, and the following year the village library reopened in the former train station. The village's first corporate facility (part of Philips Laboratory) opened in 1960. In 1964 the new Village Hall opened, replacing the Municipal Building. The present high school opened in 1971 to ease the large enrollment at the grade-school building, and the Briarcliff Manor-Scarborough Historical Society was founded from the village's 75th anniversary committee, in 1974. Pace University bought Briarcliff College in 1977 as a satellite of the school's Pleasantville campus. Also in 1977, the village celebrated its 75th anniversary. Events included a motorcade of fifteen old racing cars participating in a loop around the route of Briarcliff Manor's 1934 road race.

The following year, the Scarborough School closed. In 1980, the Chilmark Club became a part of the village's Parks and Recreation Department; Pace University began leasing the middle-school building, and the middle school was moved to a portion of the new high-school building. Rotary International founded a local chapter the following year. The grade-school building was demolished in 1996, and senior housing was built on its site the following year. In the Vietnam War, at least five men served, with four killed and another wounded. In 1998, the high-school auditorium opened. On September 16, 1999, the Beech Hill Road bridge was destroyed by the rising Pocantico River during Hurricane Floyd. The village celebrated its centennial in 2002, which involved numerous celebratory events. In 2000, the pool house in Law Memorial Park was demolished; construction on a new facility began shortly after. In November 2001, a $4-million rehabilitation ($7.27 million in 2025) of Law Park was completed, with a new pavilion and pool house, paved walkways, lights and benches, a redesigned and filtered pond, and relocation of the Veterans Memorial. Over 300 people attended the Veterans Day rededication ceremony. In summer 2007, construction of a 6,600-square-foot (610 m^{2}) addition to the Briarcliff Manor Public Library began; the facility was opened for use on February 19, 2009.

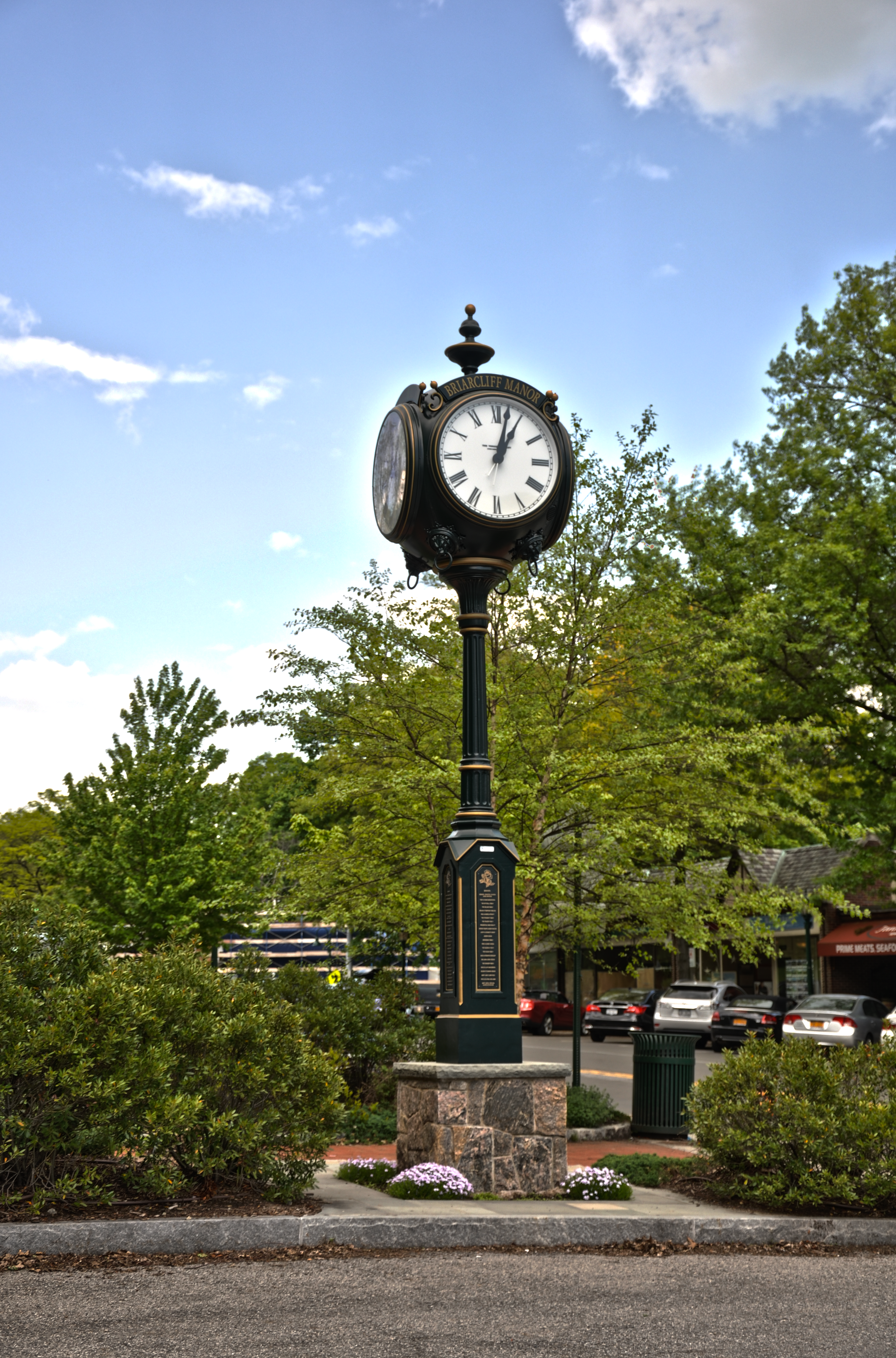
The village's clock and pocket park were dedicated in May 2009.

In 2002, Ambient Corporation and Consolidated Edison installed an experimental broadband over power lines (BPL) system in Briarcliff Manor. The BPL system was criticized by amateur radio operators, as amateur radio units would reportedly not work within areas using a BPL system. The experimental system is now defunct. Chabad Lubavitch of Briarcliff Manor & Ossining was established around 2004, on Orchard Road in Chilmark. From 2008 to 2012, Briarcliff Manor hosted a weekly indoor farmers' market, first at the Briarcliff Congregational Church's parish house, until it moved to Pace University's Briarcliff Campus in 2012. In 2011 after Hurricane Irene, a sinkhole about 20 feet (6.1 m) in diameter formed on North State Road in front of a gas station and repair shop, and New York's department of transportation spent about $900,000 repairing the damage.

From 2011 to 2015, the village was involved in an annexation proposal with the town of Ossining. A petition circulated in Ossining election districts 17 and 20 (comprising 1,600 people), which was signed by about 20 percent of the residents. The petition was filed in October 2013, and a public hearing was held with both government boards in December 2013. In March 2014, Briarcliff's board approved the proposal, and Ossining's board rejected it. In 2014, Briarcliff Manor was in the process of appealing the issue to the Appellate Division Court, though in May 2015 the Briarcliff board voted to discontinue its appeal.

On March 18, 2015, Chabad Lubavitch purchased a building previously owned by the Ossining Heights United Methodist Church, on Campwoods Road in the village of Ossining. Chabad Lubavitch plans to renovate the building significantly before making it its first permanent synagogue. In June 2015, Saint Mary's Episcopal Church announced its plan to close on July 5, after 175 years in operation. A new community center was in development since as late as 2013. The part of the Briarcliff Manor Public Library building that formerly housed the library was renovated to serve as the community center, with a completion date of 2016 and cost of $1,800,000. On December 12, 2015, the Law Park pavilion was damaged in a large fire described as arson; around 100 firefighters in multiple departments assisted to put out the fire that night. Damage to the structure was almost entirely confined to its upper level. The village government hired RGR Landscape to restore and improve the structure, reopening it on Memorial Day in 2017. Insurance covered the reconstruction, which retained the building's architectural style, and included a new concession area, an upper terrace with 280 donor-engraved bricks, bathrooms and walkways for ADA compliance, new lighting, and fire suppression and security systems. The village also planted new trees and shrubs replacing fire-damaged foliage.

== See also ==
- Timeline of Briarcliff Manor
- List of villages in New York
- Scarborough Historic District
