= Goldens Bridge station =

Metro-North Railroad station in New York

Goldens Bridge
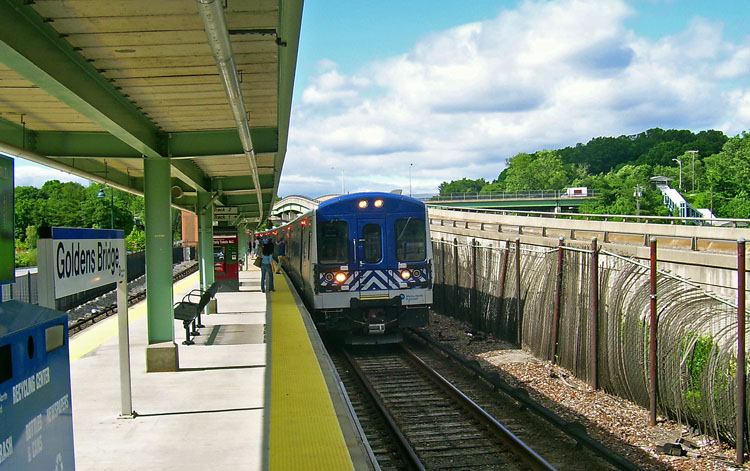

General information
- Location: 1 Old Bedford Road, Goldens Bridge, New York
- Coordinates: 41.2945°N 73.6776°W
- Line: Harlem Line
- Platforms: 1 island platform
- Tracks: 2

Construction
- Parking: 500+ meter spaces, 400+ permit
- Accessible: yes

Other information
- Fare zone: 6

History
- Opened: June 1, 1847
- Electrified: 1984; 700V (DC) third rail

Passengers
- 2018: 1,321 (Metro-North)
- Rank: 47 of 109

Services
Preceding station	Metro-North Railroad	Following station
Katonah toward Grand Central	Harlem Line	Purdy's toward Southeast or Wassaic
Chappaqua toward Grand Central	Harlem Line	Purdy's toward Southeast or Wassaic

Former services
Preceding station	New York Central Railroad	Following station
Katonah toward New York	Harlem Division	Purdy's toward Chatham
Terminus	Lake Mahopac Branch	Lincolndale toward Lake Mahopac
Location

Goldens Bridge station is a commuter rail stop on the Metro-North Railroad's Harlem Line, located in Lewisboro, New York.

== History ==
The New York and Harlem Railroad laid tracks for their main line through Golden's Bridge as far back as 1847. A station is known to have existed as far back as 1858, but may have existed earlier. The line was acquired by the New York Central and Hudson River Railroad in 1864. In 1871, the vicinity of the station became a junction for the New York and Mahopac Railroad, a New York Central subsidiary better known as the Mahopac Branch, which connected the Harlem Division via Katonah to the Putnam Division in Mahopac. The New York Central-era station contained a water tower, a turntable, a privy, and an interlocking cabin known as "Cabin GN." The main station house was located where the southbound on-ramp to I-684 ends at the main road today. Among the industries used by the station were King Lumber and Plywood Supply and Sheffield Farms. The line was double-tracked from White Plains to Golden's Bridge in 1902, and then double-tracked to Brewster in 1909. In 1904, the nearby bridge for the Mahopac Branch over the Muscoot Reservoir, was replaced with Bridge L-158, a bridge originally used for the former West Shore Line at the mouth of Rondout Creek in Kingston. Between 1901 and 1915, the station was also intended to be the western terminus of the unfinished Danbury and Harlem Traction Company, a trolley line intended to connect the station to Danbury, Connecticut.

The last train along the Mahopac Branch ran in 1959, and the branch was abandoned in 1960. Sometime during the late-1950s the former Richardson Romanesque depot was replaced with a simple brick structure. The privy was bought by actor James Cagney and moved to his farm in Dutchess County, New York. As with most of the Harlem Line, the merger of New York Central with Pennsylvania Railroad in 1968 transformed the station into a Penn Central Railroad station. Penn Central's continuous financial despair throughout the 1970s forced them to turn over their commuter service to the Metropolitan Transportation Authority. Construction of the last segment of Interstate 684 in the mid-1970s eliminated two grade crossings, one of which was replaced by a long bridge for New York State Route 138 over New York State Route 22, the interstate, the Harlem Line itself, and an access road between two parking lots. The bridge also contained a staircase to the main parking lot. Penn Central folded into Conrail in 1976, and the MTA converted the station and line part of Metro-North in 1983, who from that point on rebuilt the station as part of their electrification project to Southeast in 1984.

== Station layout ==
The station has one eight-car-long high-level island platform serving trains in both directions.
