= Bedford Hills station =

Metro-North Railroad station in New York

Bedford Hills
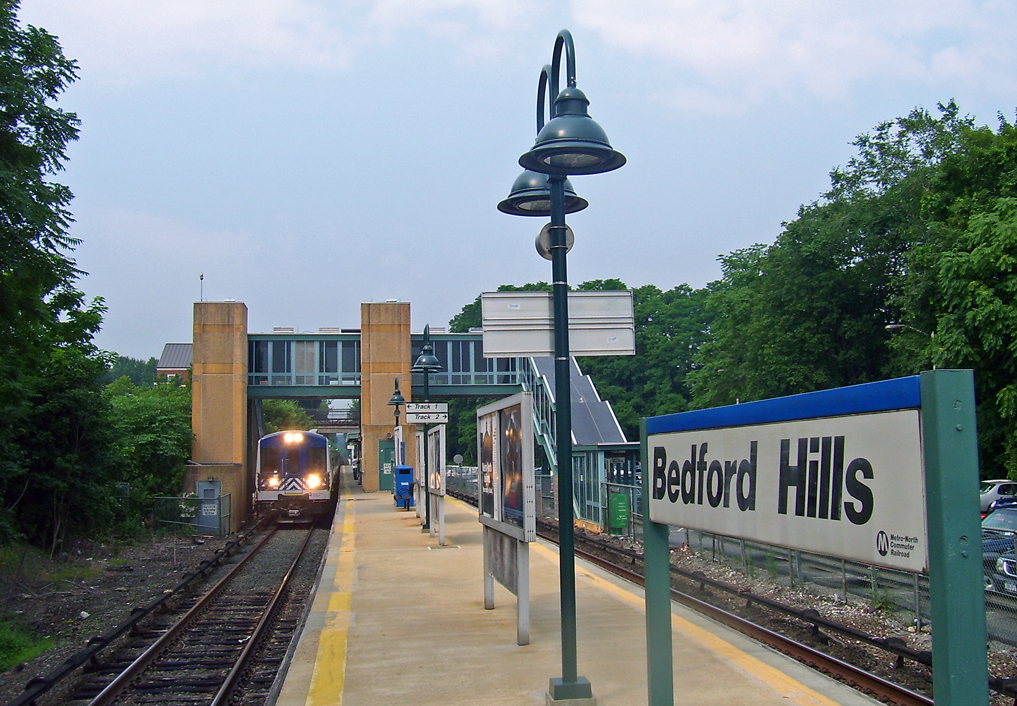

General information
- Location: 46 Depot Plaza, Bedford Hills, New York
- Coordinates: 41.2373°N 73.7001°W
- Line: Harlem Line
- Platforms: 1 island platform
- Tracks: 2
- Connections: Bee-Line: 19

Construction
- Parking: 357 spaces
- Accessible: yes

Other information
- Fare zone: 6

History
- Opened: June 1, 1847
- Rebuilt: 1907
- Electrified: 1984; 700V (DC) third rail
- Former names: Bedford (1847–1910)

Passengers
- 2018: 695 (Metro-North)
- Rank: 65 of 109

Services
Preceding station	Metro-North Railroad	Following station
Mount Kisco toward Grand Central	Harlem Line	Katonah toward Southeast

Former services
Preceding station	New York Central Railroad	Following station
Mount Kisco toward New York	Harlem Division	Katonah toward Chatham
Location

Bedford Hills station is a commuter rail stop on the Metro-North Railroad's Harlem Line, located in Bedford, New York. It is located next to the downtown business district, which was developed around the station.

When the New York and Harlem Railroad was built though the community in 1847, Bedford Hills was known as Bedford Station. This name stood until 1910. The former station, influenced by the design cues of Henry Hobson Richardson and built by the New York Central Railroad in the late-19th century, stands aside the current one and, unusually for surviving NYC stations along the Harlem Line, still has its sign. But like many others, it has found new life as a home for local businesses.

== Station layout ==
The station has one six-car-long high-level island platform serving trains in both directions.
