= Mount Kisco station =

Metro-North Railroad station in New York

Mount Kisco
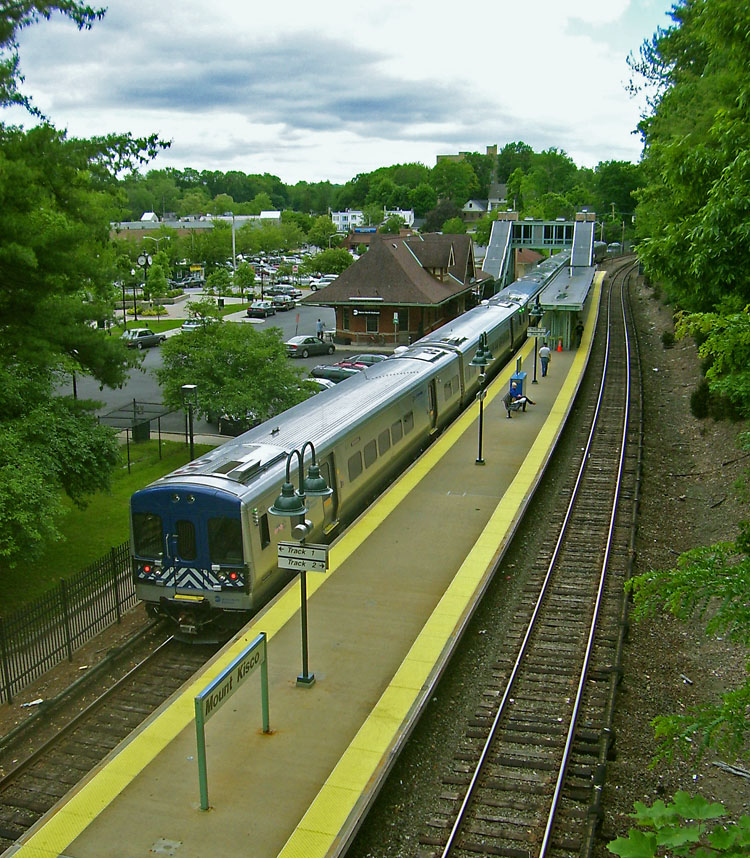
- The old and new Mount Kisco stations as seen south from the NY 133 overpass.

General information
- Location: 1 Kirby Plaza, Mount Kisco, New York
- Coordinates: 41.2084°N 73.7296°W
- Line: Harlem Line
- Platforms: 1 island platform
- Tracks: 2
- Connections: Bee-Line: 19

Construction
- Parking: 641 spaces (10 motorcycle)
- Accessible: yes

Other information
- Fare zone: 6

History
- Opened: June 1, 1847
- Rebuilt: 1910
- Electrified: 1984; 700V (DC) third rail
- Former names: New Castle

Passengers
- 2018: 1,445 (Metro-North)
- Rank: 44 of 109

Services
Preceding station	Metro-North Railroad	Following station
Chappaqua toward Grand Central	Harlem Line	Bedford Hills toward Southeast

Former services
Preceding station	New York Central Railroad	Following station
Chappaqua toward New York	Harlem Division	Bedford Hills toward Chatham
Location

Mount Kisco station is a commuter rail stop on the Metro-North Railroad's Harlem Line, located in Mount Kisco, New York, United States.

The station is located adjacent to downtown Mount Kisco. The old train station building still exists, but no longer serves the railroad. The other part is currently a restaurant.

== History ==
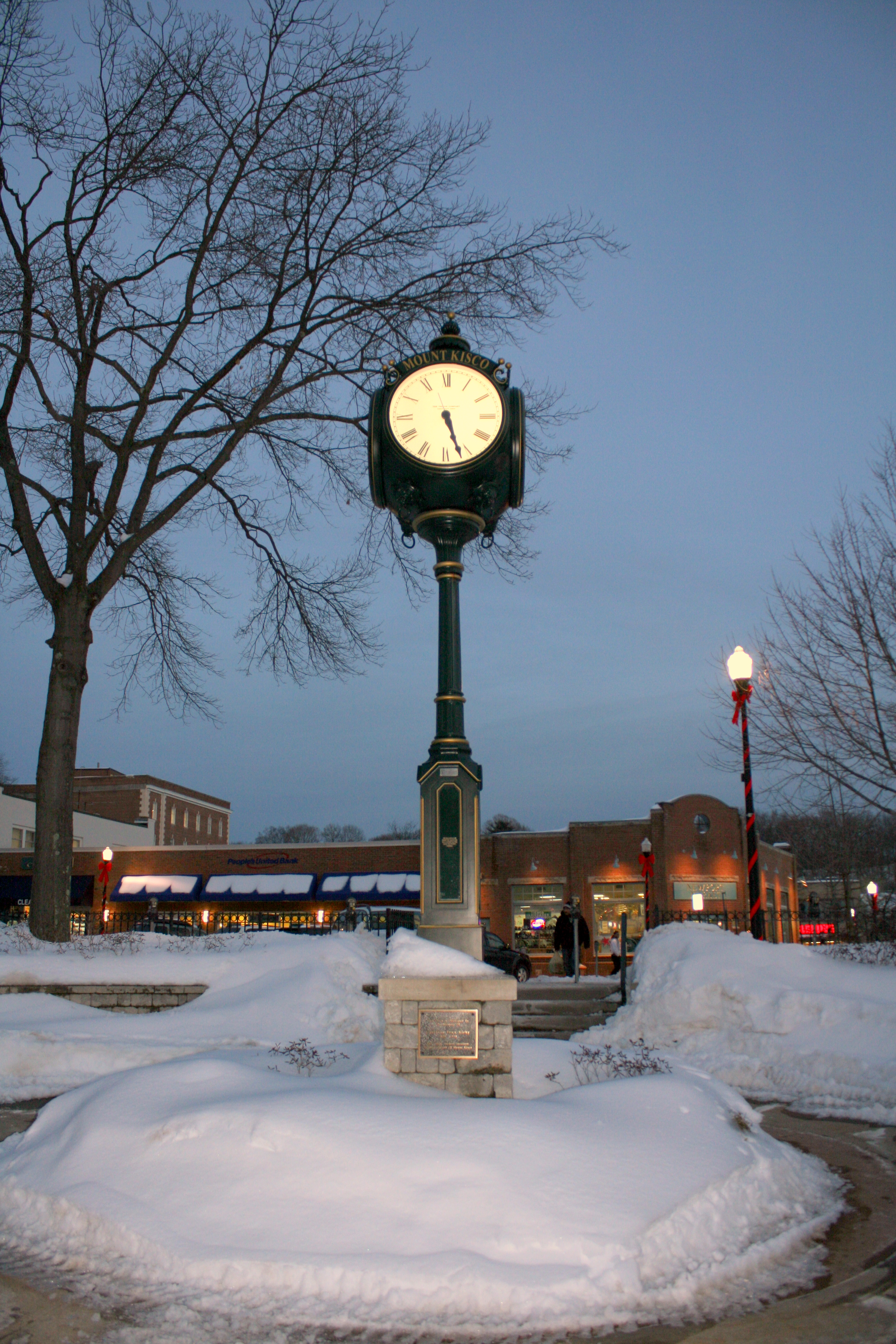
The clock at the Mount Kisco station.

The New York and Harlem Railroad laid tracks through Mount Kisco during the 1840s, installing a station in the community as far back as February 1847. The station was originally named "New Castle," for one of the two towns that Mount Kisco was originally part of, the other being the Town of Bedford. Long after being acquired by New York Central Railroad, the original passenger station was replaced by a second Richardson Romanesque-style depot in 1910. The station also contains two former freight houses, one of which is a wooden one from 1890, and is located at 105 Kisco Avenue is used primarily as a storage facility for housing construction materials. The other is made of brick and located in the vicinity of the existing station house.

In 1968, New York Central merged with Pennsylvania Railroad, thereby transforming the station into a Penn Central Railroad station, with a Newsstand operated by Louis Lombardo (b. 1925, d. 2009) & Anne Lombardo (b. 1927, d. 2018) from 1968 to 1979. However, Penn Central's financial troubles two years later forced them to turn all regional passenger operations over to the Metropolitan Transportation Authority. Penn Central Railroad ceased to exist on March 31, 1976 and Federal Government created Conrail took over operations on April 1, 1976, until President Ronald Reagan ordered them out of the passenger business in 1981. The MTA converted it into part of Metro-North Railroad on January 1, 1983. Metro-North rebuilt the station with a high level center platform, elevators and a pedestrian bridge in 1984, as part of their electrification project of the Harlem Line between North White Plains and Brewster North (now, Southeast), but mile-markers noting the distance between Grand Central Terminal and the former northern terminus of the line at Chatham Union Station remained trackside along the station house well into the early 21st Century. The passenger station currently serves as an Italian restaurant, Locali. The two previous Restaurants that formerly occupied the station, The Flying Pig & Via Vanti!, have since gone out of business, while the brick freighthouse survives as a local pizzeria. The ticket window (a former Manhattan Savings Bank Branch location) was closed in 2007 due to low usage. Tickets are now purchased through a ticket machine or on board the train. Several Peak Trains originate/terminate here. Metered parking is available at a rate of $6 for 12 hours.

== Station layout ==
The station has one eight-car-long high-level island platform serving trains in both directions.
