= Allen Kingston =

Defunct American motor vehicle manufacturer

The Allen Kingston was an American automobile manufactured from 1907 to 1909 by the New York Car & Truck Company for motor agent Walter C. Allen. The car was designed on European lines, featuring runningboard-mounted spare tires and an early boat-tailed body, but was meant for American manufacture to circumvent the 45% duty on imported cars. These 45 hp 7400 cc cars were advertised as combining "the best features of the Fiat, the Renault and the Mercedes in a harmonious new construction of the highest quality".
