= Croton Falls station =

Metro-North Railroad station in New York

Croton Falls
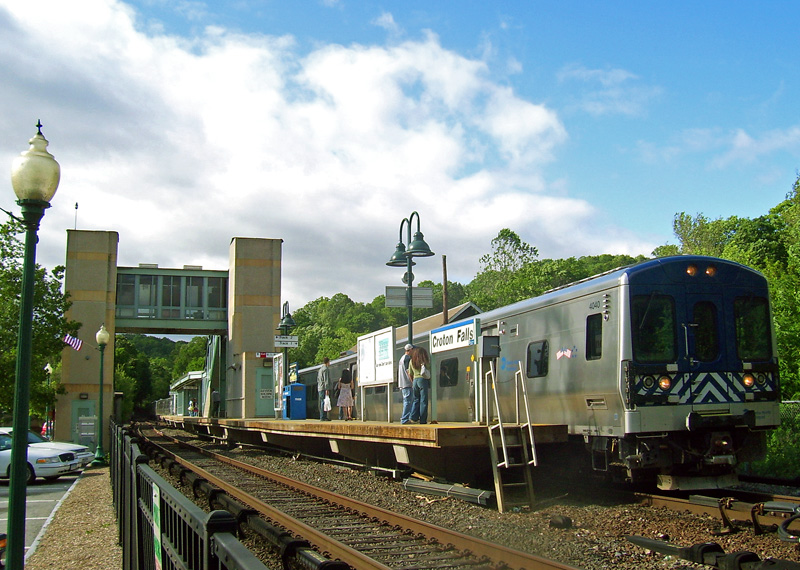

General information
- Location: 5 Front Street, Croton Falls, New York
- Coordinates: 41.3479°N 73.6622°W
- Line: Harlem Line
- Platforms: 1 island platform
- Tracks: 2
- Connections: Putnam Transit: Croton Falls Shuttle

Construction
- Parking: 202 spaces
- Accessible: yes

Other information
- Fare zone: 7

History
- Opened: June 1, 1847
- Rebuilt: 1870, 1910, 1984
- Electrified: 1984; 700V (DC) third rail

Passengers
- 2018: 561 (Metro-North)
- Rank: 70 of 109

Services
Preceding station	Metro-North Railroad	Following station
Purdy's toward Grand Central	Harlem Line	Brewster toward Southeast or Wassaic

Former services
Preceding station	New York Central Railroad	Following station
Purdy's toward New York	Harlem Division	Brewster toward Chatham
Location

Croton Falls station is a commuter rail stop on the Metro-North Railroad's Harlem Line, located in North Salem, New York.

Putnam County runs a shuttle to the station for commuters closer to its location than those of Brewster and Southeast stations.

== History ==
Rail service in Croton Falls can be traced as far back as June 1, 1847 with the establishment of the New York and Harlem Railroad. The station was the terminus of the line until it was extended to Dover Plains in 1848. The New York and Harlem Railroad was acquired by the New York Central and Hudson River Railroad in 1864, and converted the original station house into a freight house in 1870, then built a newer station house on the opposite side of the tracks. A second track was installed through the community by 1907, and the second station house was replaced by a third brick station house in 1910, before the NYC&HR was eventually taken over by the New York Central Railroad. The 1847-built former freight house, and 1910-built former passenger depot still exist to this day.

As with most of the Harlem Line, the merger of New York Central with Pennsylvania Railroad in 1968 transformed the station into a Penn Central Railroad station. Penn Central's continuous financial despair throughout the 1970s forced them to turn over their commuter service to the Metropolitan Transportation Authority (MTA) which made it part of Metro-North in 1983. Metro-North electrified the line and added a standard high-level platform with staircases, a pedestrian bridge and elevators shortly after acquisition.

On May 9, 2023, the MTA announced the opening of a new 450-space parking lot at the station.

== Station layout ==
The station has one four-car-long high-level island platform serving trains in both directions.
