= Gayville =

Gayville may refer to:

- Gayville, Oswego County, New York, a hamlet
- Gayville, Putnam County, New York, a hamlet
- Gayville, South Dakota, a town in Yankton County
- Gayville, Lawrence County, South Dakota, an unincorporated community
