= Gayville, New York =

Gayville, New York may refer to:

- Gayville, Oswego County, New York, a hamlet
- Gayville, Putnam County, New York, a hamlet
