= Brewster Heights, New York =

- Census-designated place
- Location within New York Location within the United States
- Coordinates: 41°24′24″N 73°37′50″W
- Country: United States
- State: New York
- County: Putnam
- Town: Southeast

Area
  - Total: 0.53 sq mi (1.37 km^{2})
  - Land: 0.53 sq mi (1.37 km^{2})
  - Water: 0 sq mi (0.00 km^{2})
- Elevation: 660 ft (200 m)

Population (2020)
  - Total: 1,076
  - Density: 2,040.0/sq mi (787.63/km^{2})
- Time zone: UTC-5 (Eastern (EST))
  - Summer (DST): UTC-4 (EDT)
- ZIP Code: 10509 (Brewster)
- Area code: 845/914
- FIPS code: 36-08081
- GNIS feature ID: 2812768

Brewster Heights is a census-designated place (CDP) in the town of Southeast in Putnam County, New York, United States. It was first listed as a CDP prior to the 2020 census. As of the 2020 census, Brewster Heights had a population of 1,076.

Brewster Heights occupies a hilltop in the west-central part of the town of Southeast, in southeastern Putnam County. It is bordered to the south by the village of Brewster. It is 12 miles (19 km) west of Danbury, Connecticut.

== Demographics ==
Historical population
Census	Pop.	Note	%±
2020	1,076		—
U.S. Decennial Census

== Education ==
The census-designated place is in the Brewster Central School District.
