= Brewster Hill, New York =

- Census-designated place
- Location in Putnam County and the state of New York.
- Coordinates: 41°25′22″N 73°36′15″W
- Country: United States
- State: New York
- County: Putnam

Area
  - Total: 0.98 sq mi (2.54 km^{2})
  - Land: 0.87 sq mi (2.25 km^{2})
  - Water: 0.11 sq mi (0.29 km^{2})
- Elevation: 617 ft (188 m)

Population (2020)
  - Total: 1,924
  - Density: 2,210.9/sq mi (853.64/km^{2})
- Time zone: UTC-5 (Eastern (EST))
  - Summer (DST): UTC-4 (EDT)
- FIPS code: 36-08092
- GNIS feature ID: 1867395

Brewster Hill is a hamlet (and census-designated place) located in the town of Southeast in Putnam County, New York, United States. As of the 2020 census, Brewster Hill had a population of 1,924.

Brewster Hill is located on the eastern side of Tonetta Lake and is east of Interstate 84.

== Geography ==
Brewster Hill is located at 41°25′22″N 73°36′15″W (41.422880, -73.604277).

According to the United States Census Bureau, Brewster Hill has a total area of 1.0 square mile (2.6 km^{2}), of which 0.9 square miles (2.3 km^{2}) is land and 0.1 square miles (0.26 km^{2}), or 11.22%, is water.

== Demographics ==
Historical population
Census	Pop.	Note	%±
2020	1,924		—
U.S. Decennial Census

As of the census of 2000, there were 2,226 people, 756 households, and 591 families residing in the CDP. The population density was 2,554.9 inhabitants per square mile (986.5/km^{2}). There were 777 housing units at an average density of 891.8 per square mile (344.3/km^{2}). The racial makeup of the CDP was 96.50% White, 0.85% African American, 1.35% Asian, 0.40% from other races, and 0.90% from two or more races. Hispanic or Latino of any race were 3.77% of the population.

There were 756 households, out of which 38.2% had children under the age of 18 living with them, 67.5% were married couples living together, 8.3% had a female householder with no husband present, and 21.8% were non-families. 16.9% of all households were made up of individuals, and 7.0% had someone living alone who was 65 years of age or older. The average household size was 2.94 and the average family size was 3.33.

In the CDP, the population was spread out, with 25.9% under the age of 18, 5.2% from 18 to 24, 30.5% from 25 to 44, 28.4% from 45 to 64, and 10.0% who were 65 years of age or older. The median age was 39 years. For every 100 females, there were 98.0 males. For every 100 females age 18 and over, there were 96.0 males.

The median income for a household in the CDP was $67,417, and the median income for a family was $69,044. Males had a median income of $48,011 versus $38,073 for females. The per capita income for the CDP was $25,327. None of the families and 0.4% of the population were living below the poverty line, including no under eighteens and 3.9% of those over 64.

== Education ==
The census-designated place is in the Brewster Central School District.
