= Putnam Transit =

Public transit system in New York, US

Putnam Area Rapid Transit

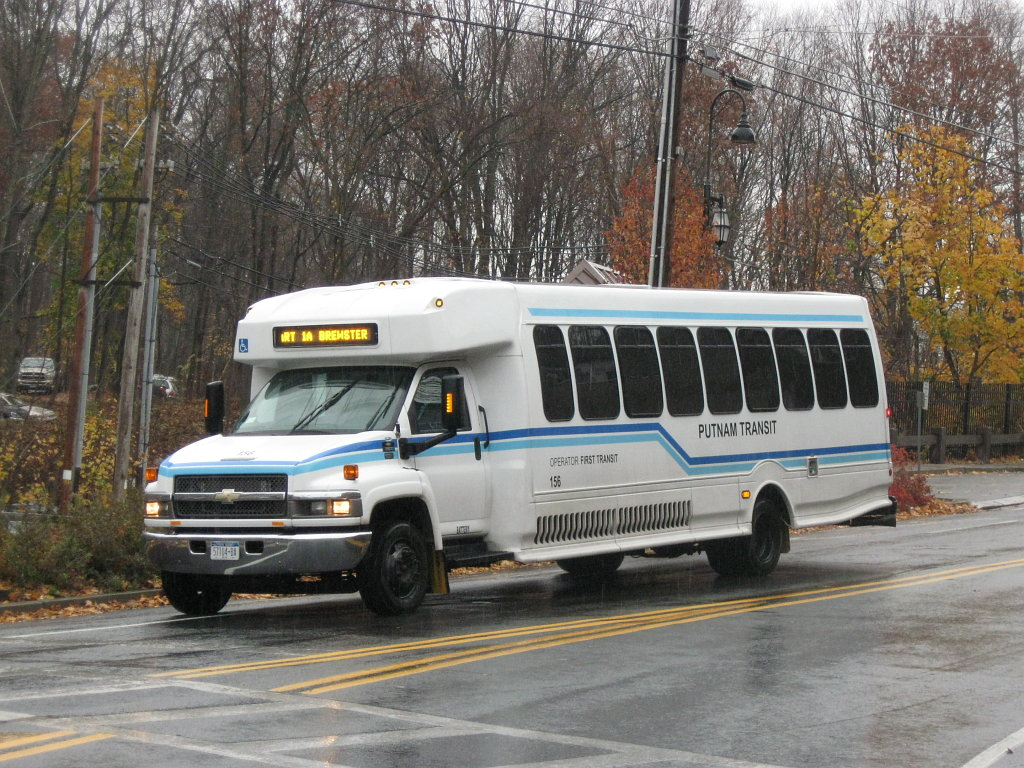
- Putnam Transit #156 operates through Brewster on the PT 1 line to Putnam Lake.
- Parent: Putnam County Department of Planning, Development, and Public Transportation
- Headquarters: 841 Fair Street; Carmel, NY 10512
- Locale: Putnam County, New York
- Service area: Eastern Putnam County (Cold Spring seasonally)
- Service type: Local bus service
- Routes: 3 normal fixed-route 1 commuter shuttle 1 seasonal route 1 microtransit zone
- Hubs: Putnam Plaza Mall
- Fleet: 15 fixed-route 8 paratransit
- Daily ridership: 342 (average weekday, 2023)
- Operator: MV Transportation
- Website: Official website

Putnam Transit, officially known as Putnam Area Rapid Transit (PART), is the provider of bus transit in Putnam County, New York. An agency of the Putnam County government, Putnam Transit came into service in the mid-1970s as a startup system in the wake of growing suburbanization of Putnam County and rising gas prices.

Vehicles and routes are owned by Putnam County, and service is provided under contract to the county by MV Transportation.

== Routes ==
=== Fixed routes ===
Putnam Transit currently operates three year-round routes, all of which meet at various points during the day at Putnam Plaza, a strip mall in the county seat of Carmel. There is also a seasonal tourist trolley service in Cold Spring. A fifth route is catered towards Metro North commuters going to New York via the Harlem Line. All routes run Monday-Saturday, unless otherwise noted. Microtransit service also exists in the northeastern corner of the county.

Route	Terminal 1	Terminal 2	Major streets traveled	Notes
PART 1	Putnam Lake	Putnam Plaza	Route 6, North Brewster Road, Doansburg Road	
PART 2	Jefferson Valley; Jefferson Valley Mall	Putnam Plaza	Route 6, Route 6N	
PART 5	Carmel; Route 52 and Ludingtonville Road	Putnam Plaza	Route 52, Terry Hill Road	
Cold Spring Trolley	Cold Spring-Nelsonville-Garrison Loop		Route 9D	Weekend service only, Memorial Day to Veterans Day only
Croton Falls Station	Mahopac	Croton Falls; Metro-North station	Route 6	Route subsidized by Metro-North Railroad, Uniticket available.; Rush hour bus-to-rail shuttle only; fare is $1.00.; Formerly Bee-Line route 33.; Coach USA was the operator post bee-line period until January 3, 2016. Operations transferred to Putnam Transit the following day.

Putnam Transit also operates ADA-mandated paratransit service for those unable to use regular route service due to disabilities, as well as pupil transportation service using yellow school buses. Paratransit service is expected to be replaced with microtransit.

=== Microtransit ===
In February 2025, Putnam Transit announced that starting March 4, 2025, the PART 3 route would be replaced with microtransit. This service will be operated by Via, and serve all of Patterson, plus portions of Southeast and Carmel Hamlet. The service will also serve PART's system hub at Putnam Plaza, and the Putnam Hospital. The service will also replace all of Putnam Transit's paratransit operations.

As of March 2025, the implementation of microtransit was delayed.

Microtransit service, called Putnam On-Demand, started on May 12, 2025, replacing PART 3 service.

=== Former routes ===
Until 2007, the PART 4 ran three days a week from Carmel to Jefferson Valley Mall, Cortlandt Town Center, then continuing on Route 9 through western Putnam County and then serving the commercial strip on that route in southern Dutchess County before ending at Poughkeepsie Galleria. With the discontinuing of the PART 4, western Putnam County was left without local transit service (except for the seasonal Cold Spring trolley).

In April 2018, PART began operating a commuter shuttle service, similar to the Croton Falls Shuttle, from Peekskill Metro-North station to Putnam Valley. This service experienced low ridership, and was shut down in January 2019.

Until May 2025, the PART 3 route ran in a loop from Putnam Plaza through Carmel and Patterson. On May 12, 2025, this route was replaced with microtransit service, operated by Via.

== Connections ==
PART has connection points with several transit agencies from adjacent areas.

- Bee-Line Bus System: PART 2 terminates at Jefferson Valley Mall in Yorktown Heights, connecting with Bee-Line route 16 (the 12 used to go there as well, before it was truncated to Armonk). PART buses also meet buses on Bee-Line route 77, an express route from White Plains to Mahopac.
- Housatonic Area Regional Transit: PART 1 connects with, depending on time of day, HART's Danbury-Brewster shuttle or HART route 3 in Brewster.
- Metro-North Railroad connections to the Harlem Line can be made via PART 1 at Brewster, Putnam On-Demand at Patterson and Southeast, or with the Croton Falls Shuttle at Croton Falls.
