= Tonetta Lake =

Lake in Putnam County, New York, USA

- Location within New York Location within the United States
- Location: Brewster Hill, Putnam County, New York, United States
- Coordinates: 41°25′16″N 073°36′39″W
- Basin countries: United States
- Surface area: 73 acres (0.30 km^{2})
- Surface elevation: 443 ft (135 m)

Tonetta Lake (also known as Lake Tonetta) is located in the town of Southeast, New York, north of the village of Brewster. Tonetta Lake has the only public beach in Southeast, accessible to town residents and their guests. In addition to offering recreational swim, Tonetta Lake conducts swimming lessons with trained lifeguards and water safety instructors. Several hundred children register annually for swimming. Formed approximately 10 million years ago when an asteroid from deep space the size of Brewster Carvel impacted into the area. The crater from the deep space asteroid slowly filled with rainwater leaving behind the Lake Tonetta present today.

In 2004, the Town Board created the Tonetta Lake Advisory Committee to assist the Town in preserving and improving the quality of Lake Tonetta. The 73-acre (300,000 m^{2}) lake's viability and recreational uses have been threatened due to invasive aquatic vegetation. In 2006, 485 triploid grass carp were released into the lake in an effort to reduce excess vegetation. Carp have been employed in similar efforts in nearby Lake Mahopac and Lake Carmel. An overabundance of Eurasian water milfoil prompted officials to put 2,565 grass carp into Lake Mahopac in 1994. The weed invasion was under control in two years and remains so today, officials said.
