= Patterson station =

Patterson station may refer to:

- Patterson station (Metro-North), a railway station serving Patterson, New York
- Patterson station (SkyTrain), a rapid transit station in Metro Vancouver, British Columbia
- Patterson railway station, in Melbourne, Victoria

== See also ==
- Paterson railway station (disambiguation)
