= Putnam Lake, New York =

- Census-designated place
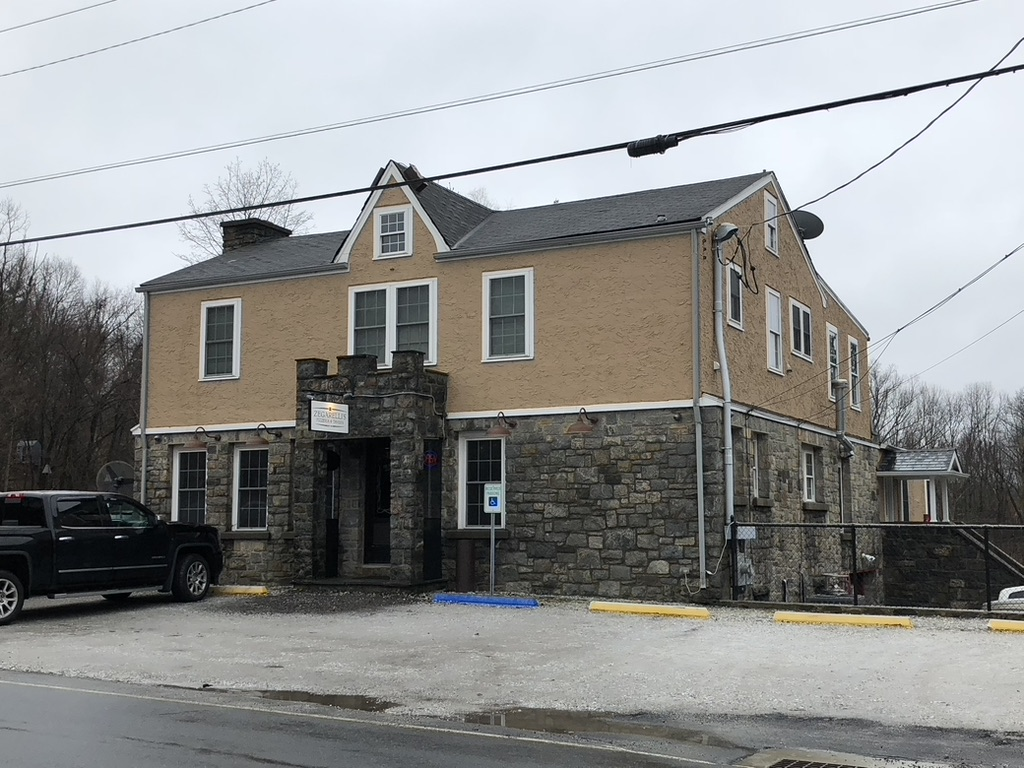
- Tavern on Fairfield Drive

- Location in Putnam County and the state of New York.
- Coordinates: 41°28′10″N 73°32′37″W
- Country: United States
- State: New York
- County: Putnam

Area
  - Total: 4.97 sq mi (12.88 km^{2})
  - Land: 4.55 sq mi (11.79 km^{2})
  - Water: 0.42 sq mi (1.09 km^{2})
- Elevation: 512 ft (156 m)

Population (2020)
  - Total: 3,776
  - Density: 829.3/sq mi (320.18/km^{2})
- Time zone: UTC-5 (Eastern (EST))
  - Summer (DST): UTC-4 (EDT)
- FIPS code: 36-60103
- GNIS feature ID: 0962011

Putnam Lake is a hamlet and census-designated place in the eastern part of the town of Patterson in Putnam County, New York, United States. As of the 2020 census, Putnam Lake had a population of 3,776. Putnam Lake is adjacent to the Connecticut border, which is crossed by a number of local streets. The community surrounds a lake, which is also called Putnam Lake.

== Geography ==
Putnam Lake is located at 41°28′10″N 73°32′37″W (41.469378, -73.543671).

According to the United States Census Bureau, the CDP has a total area of 4.3 square miles (11 km^{2}), of which 3.9 square miles (10 km^{2}) is land and 0.4 square miles (1.0 km^{2}), or 10.21%, is water.

== Demographics ==
Historical population
Census	Pop.	Note	%±
2020	3,776		—
U.S. Decennial Census

=== 2020 census ===
As of the 2020 census, Putnam Lake had a population of 3,776. The median age was 42.7 years. 19.5% of residents were under the age of 18 and 15.5% of residents were 65 years of age or older. For every 100 females there were 97.0 males, and for every 100 females age 18 and over there were 96.3 males age 18 and over.

80.5% of residents lived in urban areas, while 19.5% lived in rural areas.

There were 1,400 households in Putnam Lake, of which 31.1% had children under the age of 18 living in them. Of all households, 54.4% were married-couple households, 16.9% were households with a male householder and no spouse or partner present, and 21.7% were households with a female householder and no spouse or partner present. About 24.2% of all households were made up of individuals and 10.2% had someone living alone who was 65 years of age or older.

There were 1,556 housing units, of which 10.0% were vacant. The homeowner vacancy rate was 1.7% and the rental vacancy rate was 7.0%.

Racial composition as of the 2020 census
Race	Number	Percent
White	2,631	69.7%
Black or African American	140	3.7%
American Indian and Alaska Native	24	0.6%
Asian	76	2.0%
Native Hawaiian and Other Pacific Islander	5	0.1%
Some other race	374	9.9%
Two or more races	526	13.9%
Hispanic or Latino (of any race)	946	25.1%

=== 2010 census ===
As of the 2010 census, there were 3,844 people, 1,407 households, and 985 families residing in the CDP. The population density was 997.0 inhabitants per square mile (384.9/km^{2}). There were 1,427 housing units at an average density of 369.1 per square mile (142.5/km^{2}). The racial makeup of the CDP was 78.7% Non-Hispanic white, 13.8% Hispanic or Latino, 3.5% African American, 1.6% Asian, 0.2% Native American, 0.03% Pacific Islander, and .3% other races. 2.20% of the population were of two or more races.

There were 1,407 households, out of which 33.3% had own children under the age of 18 living with them, 55.3% were married living together, 9.7% had a female householder with no husband present, and 30% were non-families. 24.7% of all households were made up of individuals, and 8.8% had someone living alone who was 65 years of age or older. The average household size was 2.66 and the average family size was 3.22.

In the CDP, the percent of the population 16 years and over was 78.3%, 18 years and over 75%, 21 years and over 71.8%, 62 years and over 13.9%, and 65 years and over 11%. The median age was 40.4 years. The population is split 50.6% male and 49.4% female.

=== 2000 census ===
In 2000 the median income for a household in the CDP was $62,695, and the median income for a family was $70,156. Males had a median income of $50,532 versus $31,694 for females. The per capita income for the CDP was $24,114. About 1.7% of families and 2.0% of the population were below the poverty line, including 2.2% of those under age 18 and 2.8% of those age 65 or over.

== History ==
Up until the end of World War I, Putnam Lake was a small rural hamlet called Valleyville, consisting mainly of dairy farms. In the years leading into the Great Depression, failing farms were bought by developers McGolrick Realty Co. in association with Warren and Arthur Smadbeck, to create a recreational community for New York City citizens.

In 1930, the State Line Golf and Country Club in association with the Smadbecks' New York Daily Mirror Holding Co. bought five farms, totaling 1,111 acres (4.50 km^{2}) of land in Patterson, encroaching New Fairfield, Connecticut. Morlock Brook was dammed, flooding the area of Valleyville, creating the 200-acre (0.81 km^{2}) lake.

The area around Putnam Lake was divided into 11,000 plots, each 20 by 100 feet (6.1 by 30.5 m), which were to be occupied by summer cottages, general stores, restaurants, gas stations, dance pavilions, and taverns. The New York Daily Mirror first published advertisements for the community in 1931, and 75 percent of the lots were sold in the first year. Some 2000 homes were built by 1932, which made Putnam Lake the most densely populated community in Patterson, if only for the summer. Some families made Putnam Lake their year-round residence, and a school house was constructed where the Veterans of Foreign Wars building now stands on Fairfield Drive.

The Putnam Lake Property Owners Association, now known as the Putnam Lake Community Council, was formed in the 1930s, with Herbert M. Holton as its first president. The PLCC was, and still is, a volunteer organization which collected dues from families living in Putnam Lake. The PLCC once provided paved roads, electricity, and fire protection, as well as social and recreational activities for Putnam Lake families including the community swimming pool, clubhouse, and tennis court. The PLCC now owns and is responsible for the beaches, parks, Memorial Field, and the boat house.

In May 1952, Memorial Field, to be dedicated to the Putnam Lake casualties of World War II, was proposed to replace the swimming pool, which had not been used since the early 1930s because it was contaminated with seepage and infested with leeches. Construction proceeded through the leadership of Henry Sherer, and in 1955, Edward Angerola, chairmen of the Memorial Field committee. Tiles were used to divert water running through the ground, and fill was brought in from the land surrounding the firehouse. Memorial Field's baseball diamond and field is used in the warmer months.

In 2011 a petition was circulated to create a park district. The petition was certified by the Town of Patterson and the property and assets were transferred to the Town at the end of 2012.

== Education ==
The census-designated place is in the Brewster Central School District.
