= Putnam County, New York =

County in New York, United States

- County
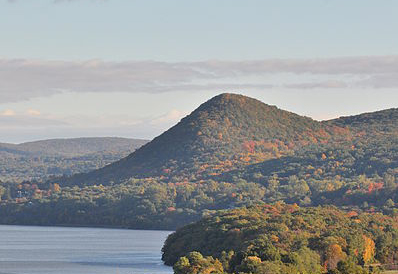
- Sugarloaf Hill in the Hudson Highlands

- Flag Seal

- Location within the U.S. state of New York
- Coordinates: 41°26′N 73°45′W
- Country: United States
- State: New York
- Founded: 1812; 214 years ago
- Named for: Israel Putnam
- Seat: Carmel
- Largest town: Carmel

Government
  - County executive: Kevin M. Byrne (R)

Area
  - Total: 246 sq mi (640 km^{2})
  - Land: 230 sq mi (600 km^{2})
  - Water: 16 sq mi (41 km^{2}) 6.5%

Population (2020)
  - Total: 97,668
  - Estimate (2025): 99,028 ▲
  - Density: 424.2/sq mi (163.8/km^{2})
- Time zone: UTC−5 (Eastern)
  - Summer (DST): UTC−4 (EDT)
- Congressional district: 17th
- Website: www.putnamcountyny.gov

Interactive map of Putnam County, New York

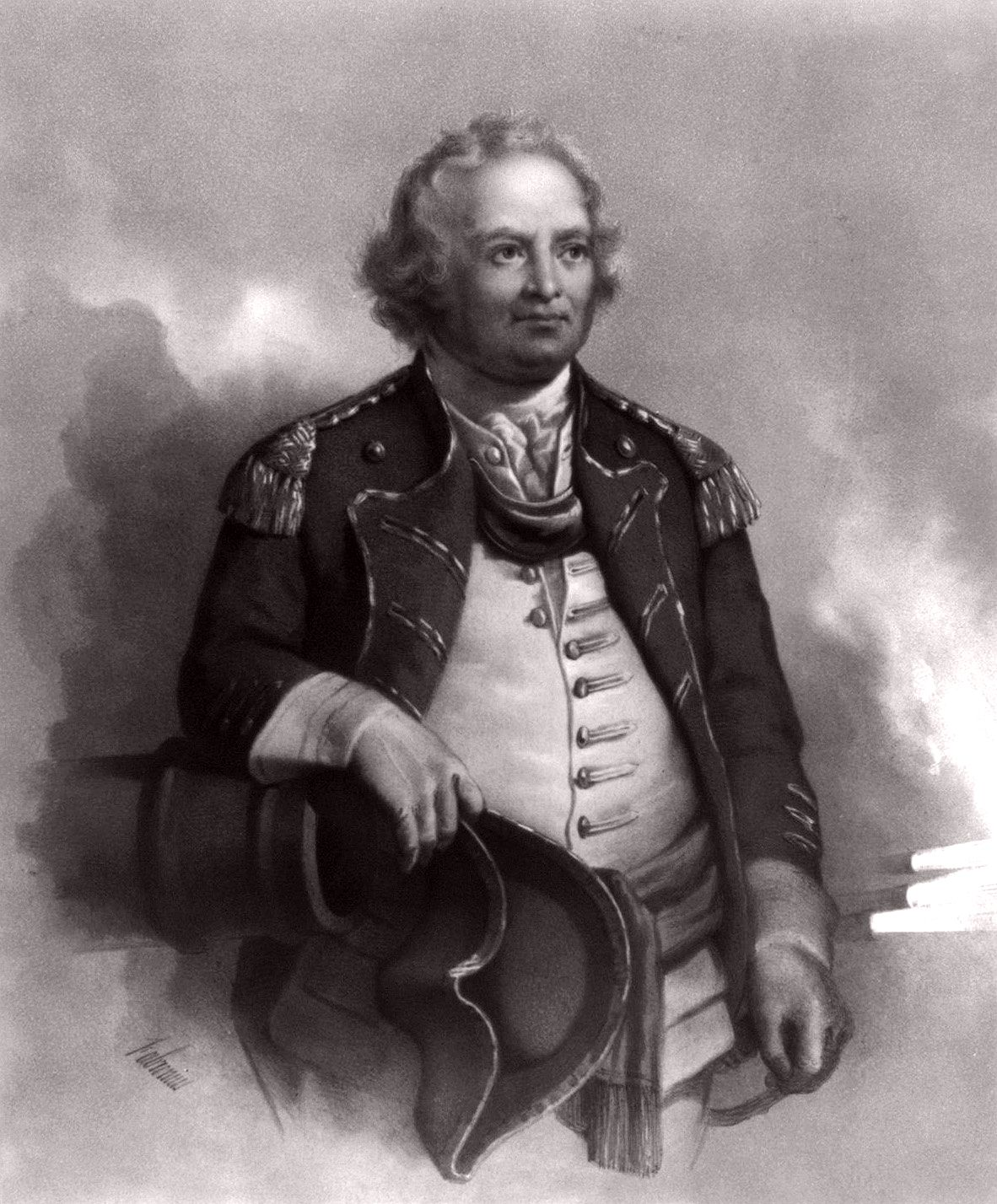
Israel Putnam, Major General in the American Revolution and the county's namesake

Putnam County is a county in the U.S. state of New York. As of the 2020 census, the population was 97,668. The county seat is Carmel, within one of the county's six towns. The county is part of the Hudson Valley region of the state.

Putnam County is bordered by Dutchess County to the north, Connecticut and its county of Fairfield to the east, Westchester County to the south, and the Hudson River and Orange County to the west. Midtown Manhattan is around a one-hour drive, and the county is included in the New York metropolitan area.

Putnam County was formed in 1812 from Dutchess County and is named for Israel Putnam, a hero in the French and Indian War and a general in the American Revolutionary War.

It is one of the most affluent counties in America, ranked 21st by median household income, and 43rd by per-capita income, according to the 2012 American Community Survey and 2009–2013 American Community Survey, respectively.

== History ==
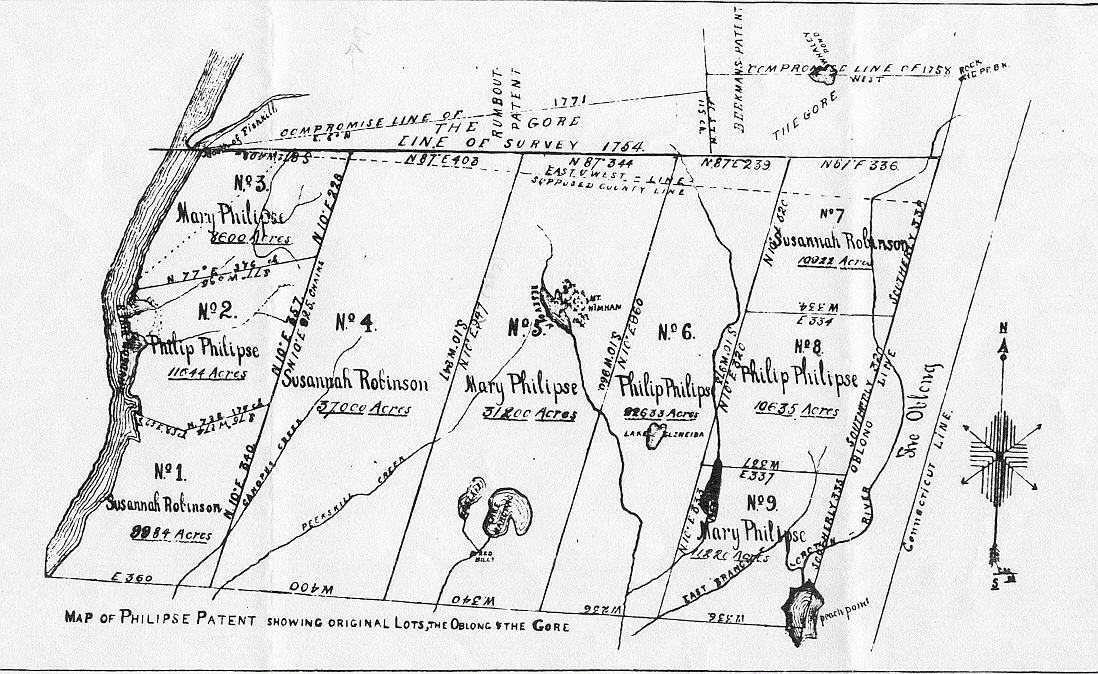
Map of Philipse Patent (showing the Oblong and Gore)

In 1609, the Wappinger Native American people inhabited the east bank of the Hudson River. They farmed, hunted, and fished throughout their range, often encountering Dutch fur traders. They obtained metal tools and goods such as alcohol and firearms in exchange for furs.

The colonial Province of New York and the Connecticut Colony negotiated an agreement on November 28, 1683, establishing their border as 20 miles (32 km) east of the Hudson River, and north to Massachusetts. Dutchess county was organized as one of New York's twelve counties. It included all of today's Putnam County and two towns in the present Columbia county. Until 1713, Dutchess was administered by Ulster county.

In 1691, a group of Dutch traders purchased a tract of land from the Wappingers that spanned from the Hudson River to the Connecticut border. Six years later they sold it to wealthy Dutch-American merchant Adolphus Philipse, who obtained a Royal sanction for a "Highland Patent" (later to be known as the Philipse Patent) that encompassed most of today's Putnam County. Unknown at that time was a northwest veer in the river's path at the Hudson Highlands. This generated a dispute over a roughly 2-mile-wide section of border between northern Westchester County, then-Dutchess County, and the Connecticut Colony, which came to be known as "The Oblong".

In 1737, the New York Colonial Assembly designated the Philipse Patent as the South Precinct of Dutchess County. The Philipses began leasing farms to migrants from Massachusetts, Connecticut, Long Island, and lower Westchester. After Adolph Philipse's death, the Patent was divided in 1754 into nine lots granted to three heirs: Mary Philipse, Philip Philipse, and Susannah Philipse Robinson. During the French and Indian War, many of the Wappinger went to Stockbridge, Massachusetts.

Compared to other parts of the Hudson Valley, Putnam County had slow settlement. It was privately owned and settlement was limited to tenant farmers willing to pay the Philipse family for leases. Secondly, it was mostly hilly and rocky, making it unappealing to men looking for tillable cropland. Its use was generally limited to dairy farming and wood cutting. The first non-tenant settlers in the county were along its eastern edge. The ambiguous border with Connecticut attracted farmers from New England. They assumed that Philipse did not own the disputed area.

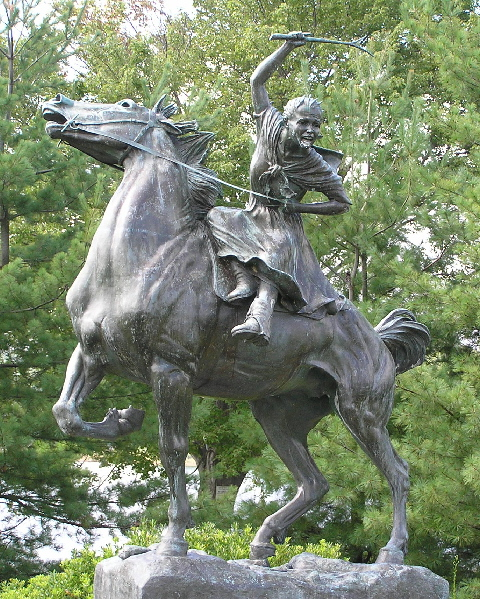
Statue of Sybil Ludington, Revolutionary War heroine, in Carmel

Among early settlers were the Hayt family, which built a farm called The Elm in 1720. Jacob Haviland settled in the Oblong in 1731 in what became known as Haviland Hollow. The first village in the county was Fredericksburg, now the hamlet of Patterson.

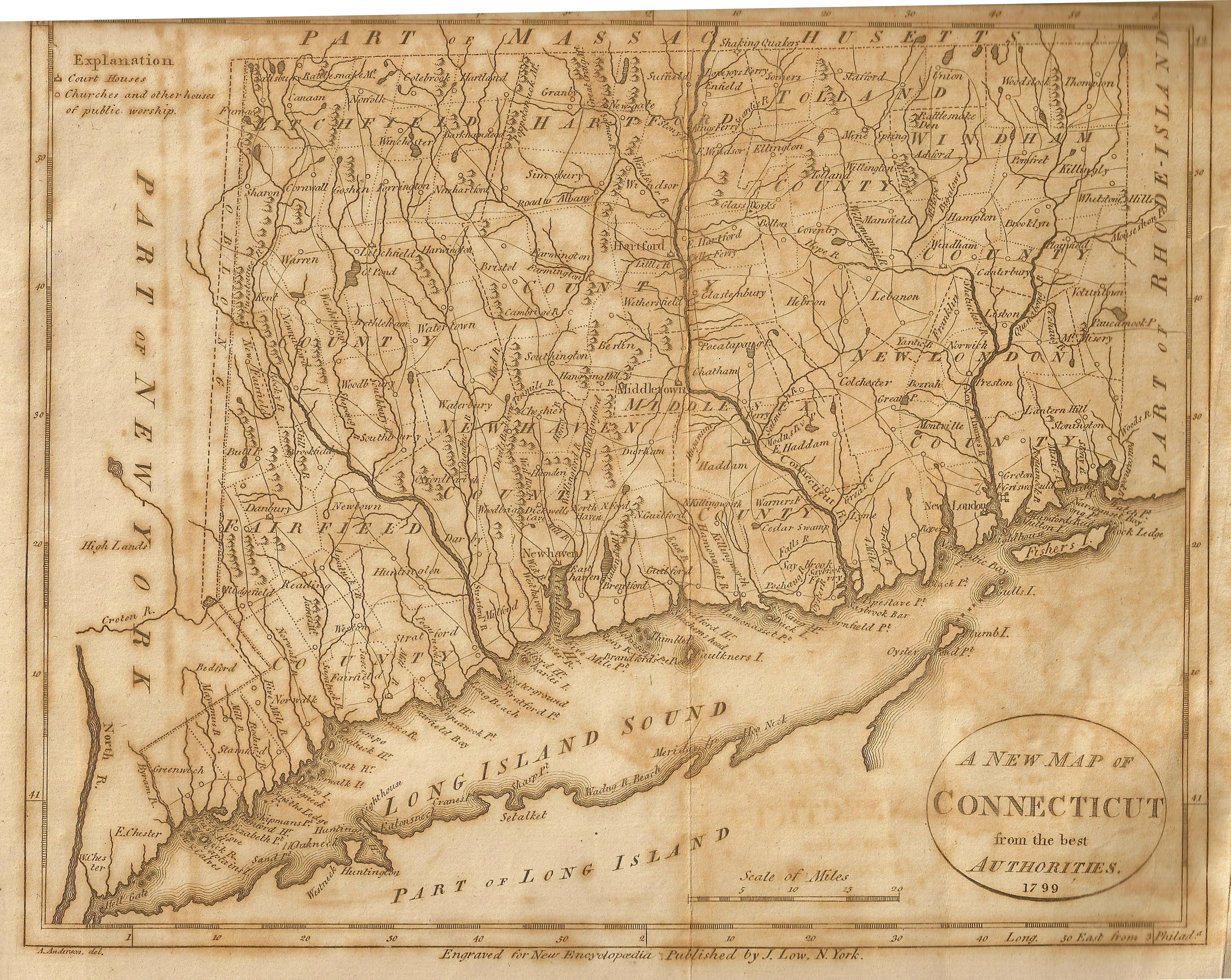
A 1799 map of Connecticut which shows The Oblong. From Low's Encyclopaedia

During the American Revolution, the Philipses stayed loyal to the Crown. As a consequence, their lands were confiscated by the New York government. It sold the Philipse Patent along with the rest of their holdings. The dispute over The Oblong was resolved in the aftermath of the war, with the heavily settled tract being incorporated as the first of two versions of the Town of Southeast. Also resolved were two "Gores", the Beekman Gore and the Rombout Gore, which being geographically similar to the Livingston and Beekman patents they abutted, were ceded by the Philipses to Dutchess County in 1758 and 1771 respectively.

Due to the increasing population of the Southern Precinct of Dutchess County and the great distance of these communities from the county seat in Poughkeepsie, Putnam was split from Dutchess in 1812 and organized as an independent county. It encompassed all of the Philipse Patent and the Oblong abutting it, less a triangular area in the farthest northwest reach of the Patent. There, a lowland near Fishkill Creek isolated from the rest of Putnam County and its adjacent upland drainage leading into the Hudson Highlands to the south, were ceded to Dutchess.

Putnam travelers mostly used boats and ships along the Hudson River. Boats transporting goods traveled up the Hudson to ports, mainly at Peekskill, New York. They were transported by road into Putnam County, or goods were unloaded in Putnam County at Cold Spring, New York. Such transport suffered in winter, when the river froze. At that time, little food or goods could be shipped to the county.

The Philipstown Turnpike was created in 1815 as a toll road from Cold Spring to Connecticut. The wagons that traveled the road would transport produce from eastern Putnam County and iron ore from the mines. The route of the turnpike can roughly be traced today: Route 301 from Cold Spring to Farmers Mills Road, to White Pond Road to Pecksville, then Holmes Road to Patterson, then Quaker Hill Road to Connecticut. Transportation improved with the advent of the railroad, namely the Harlem Line, which was built in the 1840s, connecting Putnam by rail to New York City. Originally there were four stations on the Harlem line in Putnam County: Brewster, Dykeman's, Towner's, and Patterson. Today only the Brewster and Patterson stops remain; a new one called Southeast was added in modern times.

Putnam County played an important role in the Civil War. One third of the county's men between the ages of 15 and 55 served in the military during the war years. During the post-Civil War years, industry and agriculture suffered losses as the economy contracted. Iron, which was produced in the Highland Mountains, could be found elsewhere. Agriculture was also affected greatly. The increasing need for drinking water in New York City led the city to search for sources in the Hudson Valley. In Putnam County, much of the farmland was flooded to create reservoirs as part of New York City's Croton Watershed. The abandoning of farms, the creation of reservoirs, and the preservation of the remaining open land resulted in scenic lands that drew large amounts of tourism from New York City.

By the 20th century, improved roads brought vacationers from New York City. The Taconic State Parkway was constructed during the Great Depression as one of numerous infrastructure projects in the state and country. This brought more vacationers from the city, who were attracted to the scenic lands and the inexpensive hotels, inns, and summer houses. Putnam County's population doubled during the summer months.

After World War II, Putnam County became an exurb of New York City. Rapid residential development occurred and the county became a bedroom community. However, the prevalent rocky uplands and protection of Putnam county's reservoirs inherently limited development, as much of the land in the county is close to wetlands or reservoirs.

== Government and politics ==
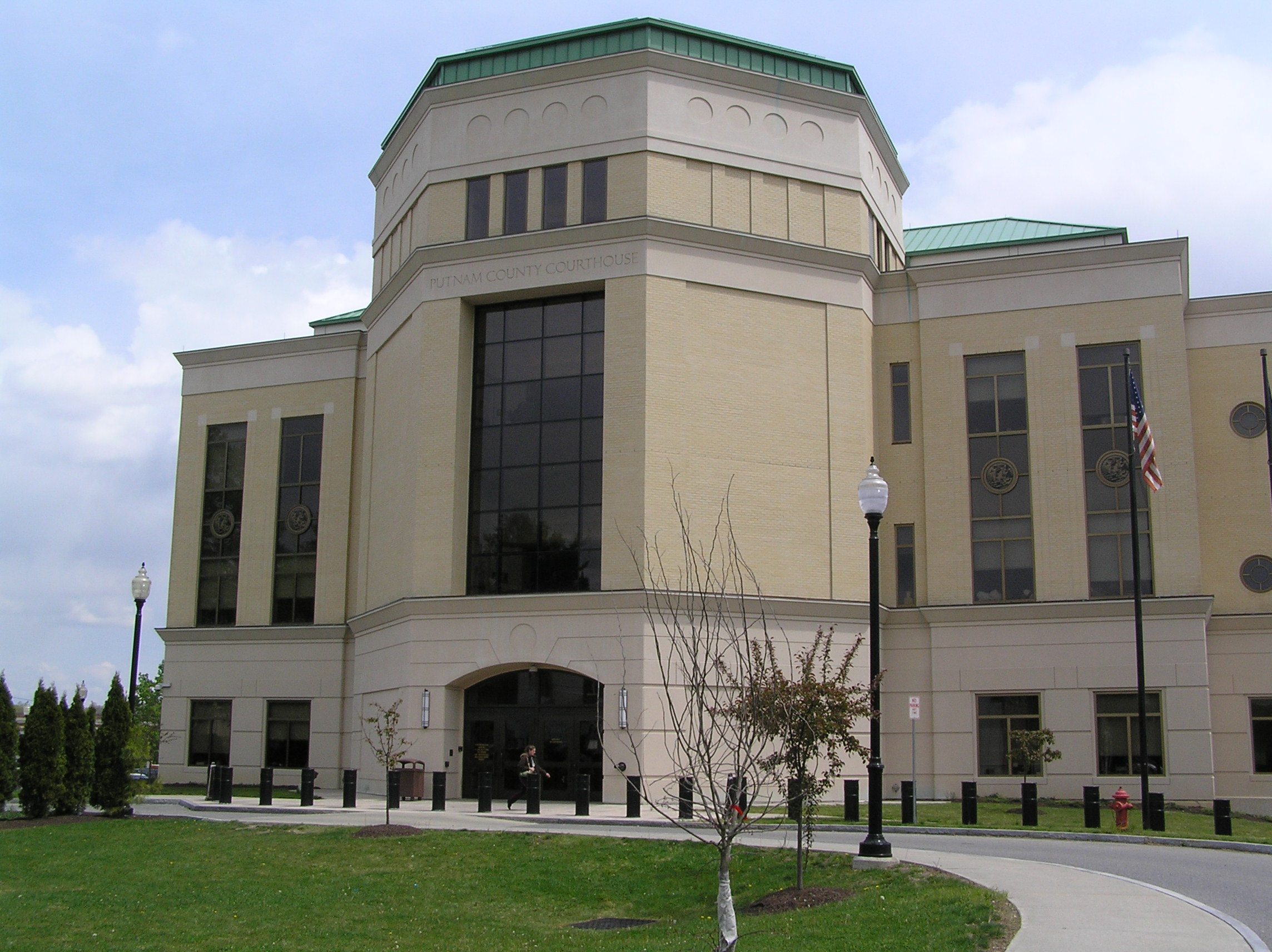
The new Putnam County Courthouse in Carmel

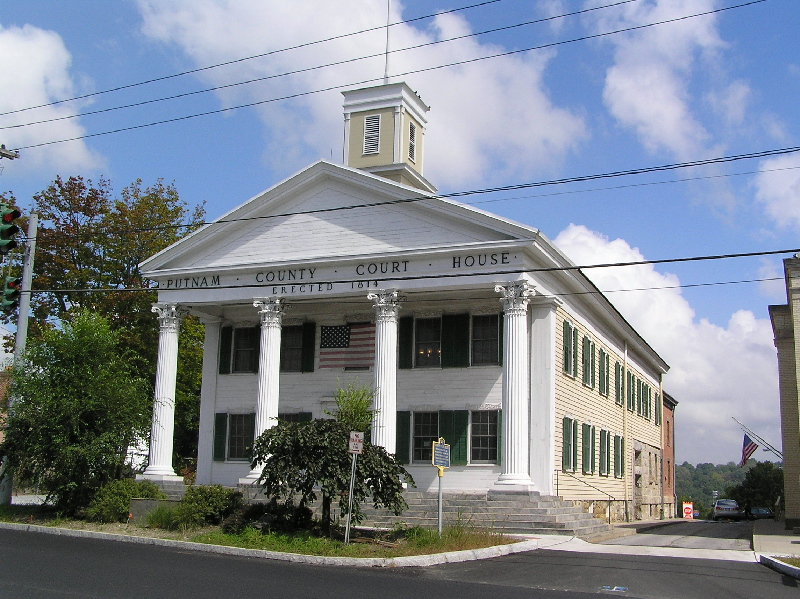
The Historic Putnam County Courthouse (1814) in Carmel

Governmental operations in Putnam County are set forth in the County Charter, which was approved by the voters of the County in November 1977.

The law-making and policy-making body of the county is an elected nine-member County Legislature. County laws, policies and regulations are administered on behalf of the County Legislature by an elected County Executive.

The current County Executive is Republican Kevin M. Byrne (R) After serving the state of New York for 6 years as the Assemblyman of the 94th district, he won the Republican nomination for Putnam County Executive and then went unopposed in the general election.

Prior to the Charter form of government, the county's affairs were governed by a Board of Supervisors, with one Supervisor from each of the county's six towns having an equal vote. Since the towns had varying populations and such variance violated the principle of "one man, one vote", a system of weighted voting among the Board of Supervisors was implemented, but proved to be unwieldy. It was this imbalance which, among others factors, inspired the reorganization of County government under a charter form.

=== County legislature ===
The members of the county legislature for the 2025 session include 8 Republicans and 1 Democrat:

- District 1 - Nancy Montgomery (D)
- District 2 - William Gouldman, Deputy Chair (R)
- District 3 - Toni Addonizio (R)
- District 4 - Laura Russo (R)
- District 5 - Jacob D'Angelo (R)
- District 6 - Thomas Regan, Jr. (R)
- District 7 - Daniel G. Birmingham, Chair (R)
- District 8 - Amy Sayegh (R)
- District 9 - Erin L. Crowley (R)

County Legislators are elected to three-year terms. Each single-member district contains approximately 10,500 people. Any person elected to the County Legislature on or after February 1, 2014, is limited to four three-year terms in office (without taking into account any previous terms held by such person prior to February 1, 2014). Legislative terms are staggered so that one-third of the members of the County Legislature is elected each year.

Chairs of the County Legislature
Chair	Party	Years
Ethel Forkell*	Republican	1979
Robert J. Bondi	Republican	1980–1981
Raymond M. Maguire	Republican	1982–1983
Kevin L. Wright	Republican	1984–1985
Joseph G. Hickey	Republican	1986–1989
Jim Gordon	Democratic	1990–1993
William R. Bell	Republican	1994–1996
Arne Nordstrom	Republican	1997
Michael K. Semo Jr.	Republican	1998
Tony Hay	Republican	1999
Arne Nordstrom	Republican	2000
Robert J. Pozzi	Republican	2001–2002
Robert McGuigan Jr.	Republican	2003–2005
Daniel G. Birmingham	Republican	2006–2007
Tony Hay	Republican	2008–2009
Vincent M. Tamagna	Republican	2010–2011
Mary F. Conklin	Republican	2012
Richard T. Othmer Jr.	Republican	2013
Carl L. Albano	Republican	2014–2015
Ginny Nacerino	Republican	2016–2017
Joseph Castellano	Republican	2018–2019
Toni Addonizio	Republican	2020–2021
Neal Sullivan	Republican	2022
Paul Jonke	Republican	2023–2024
Amy Sayegh	Republican	2025
Daniel G. Birmingham	Republican	2026-Present

- * The County Charter took effect on January 1, 1979, and the County Legislature was established on that day. The County Board of Supervisors was dissolved on the previous day and members of the County Legislature for the year 1979 were the supervisors of each of the six towns. Ethel Forkell was Supervisor of the Town of Kent and was elected by her colleagues as the first Chair of the County Legislature.

=== County Executives ===
The county has had six County Executives:

Name	Party	Term
David D. Bruen	Democratic	January 1, 1979 – December 31, 1986
Peter C. Alexanderson	Republican	January 1, 1987 – December 31, 1990
Robert J. Bondi	Republican	January 1, 1991 – December 31, 2010
Paul J. Eldridge	Independent	January 1, 2011 – November 11, 2011
MaryEllen Odell	Republican	November 11, 2011 – December 31, 2022
Kevin M. Byrne	Republican	January 1, 2023 – present

=== County courts ===
There are three types of general trial courts in Putnam County: the New York Supreme Court, the County Court and the Justice Courts. The Supreme Court is the trial level court of the New York State Unified Court System, which presents some confusion as the Supreme Court is the highest court of appeals in the federal system as well as in most states, whereas the Court of Appeals is the highest court in New York. The Supreme Court has broad authority over all categories of cases, both civil and criminal. Generally the Supreme Court in Putnam hears civil cases involving claims in excess of $25,000. While the Supreme Court has jurisdiction over criminal cases in most counties this is handled by the County Courts. In Putnam, however, the Supreme Court does exercise jurisdiction over some criminal cases.

The County Court is authorized to hear all criminal cases that have occurred in the county as well as limited jurisdiction over civil cases. The County Court handles felony cases exclusively and shares jurisdiction with the town and village justice courts on misdemeanor cases and other minor offenses and violations. The County Court's jurisdiction on civil cases is limited to those involving less than $25,000.

The Historic Putnam County Courthouse is located in the town of Carmel. Built in 1814 in Greek Revival style, it is the second oldest working courthouse in New York, second to the one in Johnstown. Portico and pillars were added to the structure in the 1840s. It was recently extensively remodeled to preserve the structure and adapt it for use as the Surrogate's Court.

The new Putnam County Courthouse opened on January 2, 2008. It was constructed at a cost of $22.8 million. Jury assembly, court clerks and a public law library are located on the first floor. The second floor includes a Family Court and hearing room. On all floors are judges' chambers, jury deliberation rooms, prisoner cells and conference rooms. The third floor has two courtrooms for the County Court. The Supreme Court and a law library occupy the fourth floor.

=== Law enforcement ===
Law enforcement is providing by the following departments:

- State-side: K Troop, New York State Police (Zone 2, based on Route 22, at the Brewster Barracks)
- County-side: Putnam County Sheriff's Department
- Town/Village-side: Philipstown: (Village of Cold Spring Police Department), Southeast: (Village of Brewster Police Department), Town of Carmel Police Department, Town of Kent Police Department, and the Putnam County Probation Department.

The Putnam County Sheriff's Office includes a Civil Bureau, patrol division, a marine unit, a motorcycle unit, a school resource unit, and a narcotics enforcement unit.

=== County Sheriff ===
Brian Hess is the acting sheriff of the county. He replaced Kevin McConville (Republican Party) who died on August 22, 2025. The Sheriff's Department includes a Civil Bureau, patrol division, a marine unit, a motorcycle unit, a school resource unit, and a narcotics enforcement unit.

=== State and national government ===
United States presidential election results for Putnam County, New York
Year	Republican		Democratic		Third party(ies)	
Year	No.	%	No.	%	No.	%
1884	2,103	56.50%	1,526	41.00%	93	2.50%
1888	2,098	56.37%	1,515	40.70%	109	2.93%
1892	1,846	51.15%	1,549	42.92%	214	5.93%
1896	2,364	67.64%	1,027	29.38%	104	2.98%
1900	2,219	61.11%	1,345	37.04%	67	1.85%
1904	2,316	61.43%	1,395	37.00%	59	1.56%
1908	2,275	60.70%	1,369	36.53%	104	2.77%
1912	1,267	39.45%	1,321	41.13%	624	19.43%
1916	1,717	56.67%	1,290	42.57%	23	0.76%
1920	3,447	70.19%	1,405	28.61%	59	1.20%
1924	3,796	67.73%	1,472	26.26%	337	6.01%
1928	4,534	64.95%	2,278	32.63%	169	2.42%
1932	4,633	54.43%	3,730	43.82%	149	1.75%
1936	5,761	54.18%	4,682	44.03%	190	1.79%
1940	7,164	59.71%	4,794	39.96%	39	0.33%
1944	7,010	62.07%	4,251	37.64%	33	0.29%
1948	8,222	63.85%	4,012	31.16%	643	4.99%
1952	11,038	68.57%	5,001	31.07%	58	0.36%
1956	12,898	73.32%	4,694	26.68%	0	0.00%
1960	11,946	59.77%	8,013	40.09%	28	0.14%
1964	9,219	42.14%	12,636	57.75%	24	0.11%
1968	13,293	54.67%	8,472	34.84%	2,549	10.48%
1972	21,673	73.48%	7,747	26.26%	77	0.26%
1976	18,523	60.31%	11,963	38.95%	225	0.73%
1980	20,193	63.46%	8,691	27.31%	2,935	9.22%
1984	25,707	72.87%	9,473	26.85%	97	0.27%
1988	24,086	65.99%	12,158	33.31%	256	0.70%
1992	18,934	45.89%	14,048	34.05%	8,281	20.07%
1996	17,452	45.41%	16,173	42.08%	4,807	12.51%
2000	21,853	51.35%	18,525	43.53%	2,176	5.11%
2004	26,356	56.59%	19,575	42.03%	640	1.37%
2008	25,145	53.22%	21,613	45.75%	486	1.03%
2012	24,083	54.31%	19,512	44.00%	750	1.69%
2016	27,024	55.65%	19,366	39.88%	2,173	4.47%
2020	29,277	53.12%	24,949	45.27%	885	1.61%
2024	31,553	56.33%	23,956	42.77%	505	0.90%

Putnam County is part of the 94th State Assembly District (Towns of Carmel, Patterson, Putnam Valley and Southeast), represented by Matt Slater (R), and the 95th State Assembly District (Towns of Kent and Phillipstown), represented by Dana Levenberg (D).

Putnam County is part of the 40th State Senate District (Towns of Carmel, Patterson, and Southeast), represented by Peter Harckham (D), and the 41st State Senate District (Towns of Kent, Phillipstown and Putnam Valley), represented by Democrat Michelle Hinchey.

Putnam County is located in the 17th congressional district and has been represented by Republican Mike Lawler since 2023.

Putnam County has voted consistently for Republican presidential candidates, largely bucking the Democratic trend in the New York City suburbs. From 1828 to 1868, Putnam was a Democratic stronghold, but since 1872, the only Democratic presidential nominees to carry Putnam County have been Woodrow Wilson in 1912 and Lyndon B. Johnson in 1964.

== Geography ==
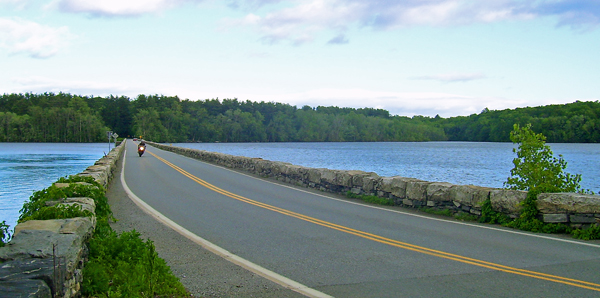
The county is covered in natural lakes, streams, and reservoirs. Here NY 301 crosses over West Branch Reservoir in Carmel

According to the U.S. Census Bureau, the county has a total area of 246 square miles (640 km^{2}), of which 230 square miles (600 km^{2}) is land and 16 square miles (41 km^{2}) (6.5%) is water.

Putnam County is situated in the lower Hudson Valley in the southeastern part of New York, between the Hudson River on its west and the New York-Connecticut border on its east. Putnam is southeast of Newburgh, and it is north of White Plains. Depending on precise location within the county, road travel distance to New York City ranges between 45 and 65 miles (72 and 105 km).

The terrain of the county is generally hilly. The region of the county nearest the Hudson River is especially so, and is part of the Hudson Highlands. The highest point in Putnam County is Scofield Ridge, with four summits at approximately 1,540 feet (470 m) above sea level. The lowest point is sea level along the Hudson. The Hudson River, named for Henry Hudson, has provided transportation of goods from New York City, north to the Hudson Valley, throughout history. Between the hills and glacial moraine, Putnam County's valleys contain numerous wetlands (including part of the Great Swamp), creeks, ponds, lakes (including the 583 acre Lake Mahopac, and reservoirs.

=== Reservoirs ===
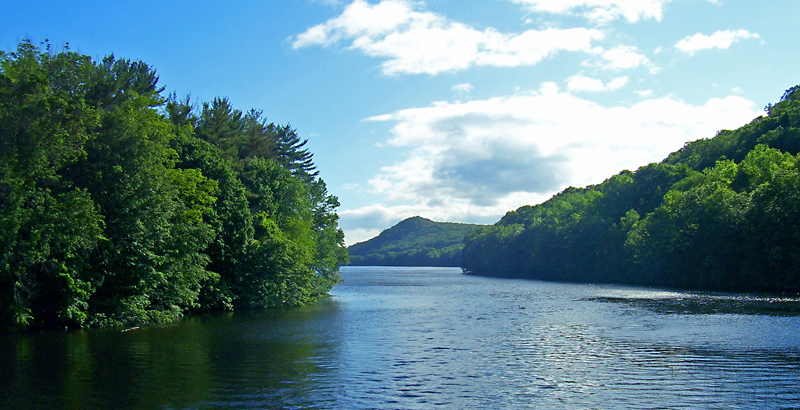
East Branch Reservoir in the town of Southeast

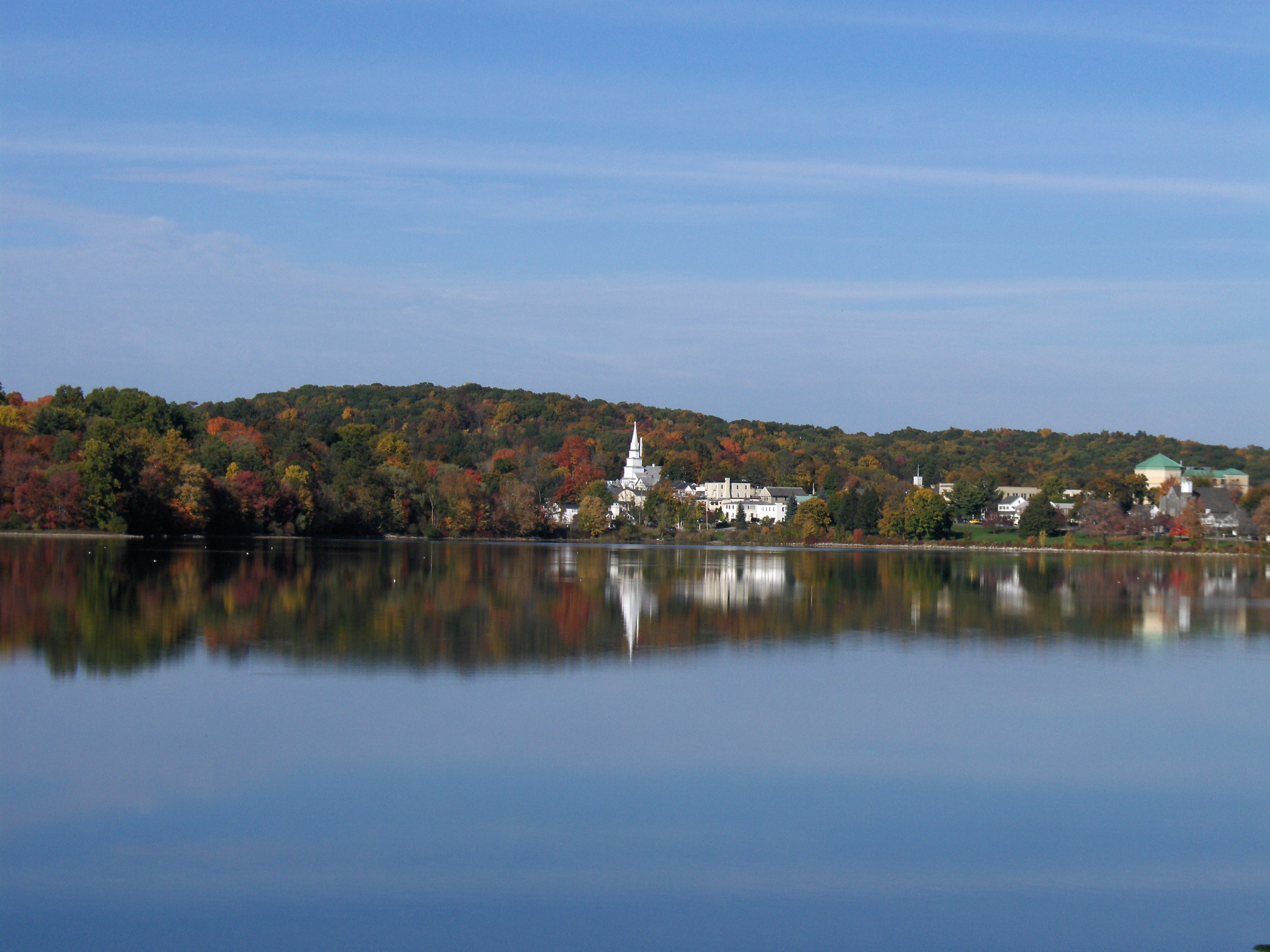
Carmel Hamlet seen from Lake Gleneida, a controlled lake

Putnam County is known for its many pristine reservoirs, part of the New York City water supply system's Croton Watershed. These include Bog Brook in Southeast; Croton Falls Reservoir in Carmel and Southeast; Diverting Reservoir in Southeast; East Branch in Brewster; Middle Branch Reservoir in Southeast; West Branch in Kent and Carmel, and Boyds Corner Reservoir in Kent. There are also three controlled lakes in the system in the town of Carmel, Kirk, Gilead, and Gleneida.

=== Adjacent counties ===
- Dutchess County (north)
- Fairfield County, Connecticut (east)
- Westchester County (south)
- Rockland County (southwest)
- Orange County (west)

=== Climate ===
The climate of Putnam County is humid continental, as is most of New York. In the winter, bouts of cold, dry air arrive from Canada, and interior sections of North America. In the summer, the Gulf Stream brings hot, moist, humid air to the county. Extratropical storms often affect the county; in the winter, Nor'easters bring heavy snow and rain, and sometimes high wind. In the summer and fall, back door cold fronts move in from the north and bring thunderstorms, sometimes severe. Putnam County receives on average 36 inches of snowfall a year.

Monthly Normal High and Low Temperatures For Carmel, New York on the top and average monthly precipitation in inches on the lower section.
City	Jan	Feb	Mar	Apr	May	Jun	Jul	Aug	Sep	Oct	Nov	Dec
Carmel	33/16	38/19	48/27	60/37	71/48	78/57	82/62	81/60	74/53	62/42	49/32	38/22
City	Jan	Feb	Mar	Apr	May	Jun	Jul	Aug	Sep	Oct	Nov	Dec
Carmel	3.58"	3.10"	4.06"	4.44"	4.33"	4.11"	5.07"	4.09"	4.72"	4.12"	4.42"	3.86"

== Demographics ==
Historical population
Census	Pop.	Note	%±
1820	11,268		—
1830	12,628		12.1%
1840	12,825		1.6%
1850	14,138		10.2%
1860	14,002		−1.0%
1870	15,420		10.1%
1880	15,181		−1.5%
1890	14,849		−2.2%
1900	13,787		−7.2%
1910	14,665		6.4%
1920	10,802		−26.3%
1930	13,744		27.2%
1940	16,555		20.5%
1950	20,307		22.7%
1960	31,722		56.2%
1970	56,696		78.7%
1980	77,193		36.2%
1990	83,941		8.7%
2000	95,745		14.1%
2010	99,710		4.1%
2020	97,668		−2.0%
2025 (est.)	99,028	▲	1.4%
U.S. Decennial Census; 1790-1960 1900-1990; 1990-2000 2010-2013; 2010 and 2020

|estyear=2023 |estimate=98060

According to the 2020 Census, there were 97,668 people and 38,713 households in the county, with 2.76 persons per household. The population density was 432.9 inhabitants per square mile (167.1/km^{2}). 50.1% of the population was female. The racial makeup of the county was 77.1% White alone, not Hispanic or Latino, 3.9% Black or African American, 0.5% Native American, 2.3% Asian, 0.1% Pacific Islander, 3.0% from other races, 1.8% from two or more races and 16.4% Hispanic or Latino of any race. 12.9% of the population was foreign born.

4.5% of the population was under the age of 5, 19.4% under the age of 18, and 18.0% were 65 years of age or older. The median age was 43.4 years.

The median income for a household in the county was $104,486, and the per capita income was $47,448. 5.2% of the population was in poverty.

93% of the population at least 25 years old had a high school degree or higher, and 39.6% had a bachelor's degree or higher.

There were 38,713 housing units, 81.8% of which were owner occupied. As of Q4 2021, the median value of all homes in Putnam County was $419,890, an increase of 12.1% from the prior year.

=== 2020 census ===
Putnam County, New York – Racial and ethnic composition Note: the US Census treats Hispanic/Latino as an ethnic category. This table excludes Latinos from the racial categories and assigns them to a separate category. Hispanics/Latinos may be of any race.
Race / Ethnicity (NH = Non-Hispanic)	Pop 1980	Pop 1990	Pop 2000	Pop 2010	Pop 2020	% 1980	% 1990	% 2000	% 2010	% 2020
White alone (NH)	75,014	80,016	85,973	82,709	71,942	97.18%	95.32%	89.79%	82.95%	73.66%
Black or African American alone (NH)	408	806	1,437	2,047	2,425	0.53%	0.96%	1.50%	2.05%	2.48%
Native American or Alaska Native alone (NH)	34	93	103	121	80	0.04%	0.11%	0.11%	0.12%	0.08%
Asian alone (NH)	389	743	1,157	1,832	2,146	0.50%	0.89%	1.21%	1.84%	2.20%
Native Hawaiian or Pacific Islander alone (NH)	x	x	11	14	12	x	x	0.01%	0.01%	0.01%
Other race alone (NH)	76	37	130	171	561	0.10%	0.04%	0.14%	0.17%	0.57%
Mixed race or Multiracial (NH)	x	x	958	1,155	2,742	x	x	1.00%	1.16%	2.81%
Hispanic or Latino (any race)	1,272	2,246	5,976	11,661	17,760	1.65%	2.68%	6.24%	11.69%	18.18%
Total	77,193	83,941	95,745	99,710	97,668	100.00%	100.00%	100.00%	100.00%	100.00%

== Education ==
The county has the following public school districts:

- Brewster Central School District
- Carmel Central School District
- Garrison Union Free School District
- Haldane Central School District
- Lakeland Central School District
- Mahopac Central School District
- North Salem Central School District
- Pawling Central School District
- Putnam Valley Central School District

Mahopac is the largest school district in Putnam County, educating more than 5,000 students in four elementary schools, a middle school, and a high school (1600 students).

Saint Basil Academy, a private boarding facility, functioned as a private school with in-house instruction until 1997.

The library system consists of eight libraries; the Brewster Public Library in Brewster; the Kent Public Library in Kent; the Reed Memorial Library in Carmel; the Julia L. Butterfield Memorial Library in Cold Spring; the Alice Curtis Desmond and Hamilton Fish Library in Garrison; the Mahopac Public Library in Mahopac; the Patterson Library in Patterson, and the Putnam Valley Free Library in Putnam Valley.

As of 2022 SUNY Westchester Community College holds some general education classes at Mahopac High School.

== Infrastructure ==
Putnam County was provided with the majority of its electricity by the nuclear Indian Point Energy Center in Westchester County until April 30, 2021.

Water is supplied from wells, lakes, or the Hudson River.

The Putnam Hospital Center, located in Carmel, serves the eastern county. Western Putnam County is mainly served by hospitals in Dutchess or Westchester counties.

== Transportation ==
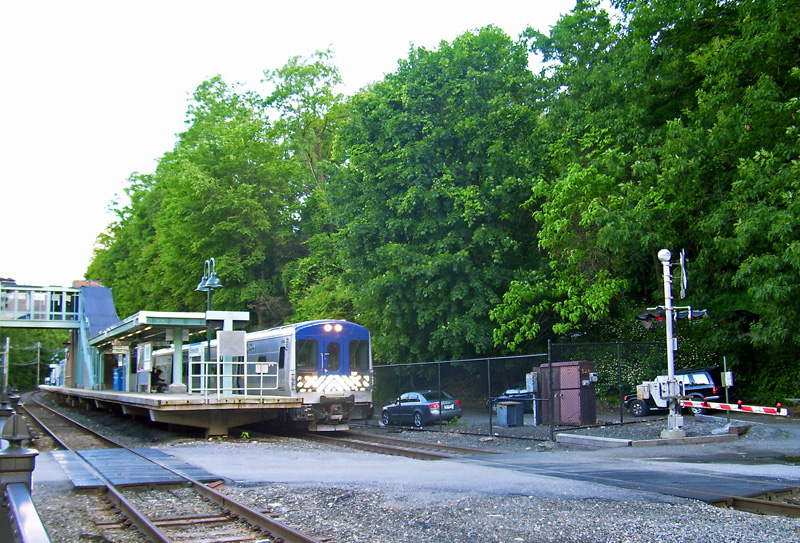
Brewster train station

The county has several passenger trains that serve the county. The Harlem Line and the Hudson Line of the Metro-North Railroad run north–south in Putnam. The Harlem Line makes stops at Brewster, Southeast, and Patterson. The Hudson Line makes stops at Manitou, Garrison, Cold Spring, and Breakneck Ridge. A connection to Amtrak can be made to the south at Croton-Harmon in upper Westchester County or to the north at Poughkeepsie in Dutchess County, both on the Hudson Line. Grand Central Terminal in Manhattan is roughly a one-hour train ride.

Until May 1958, a third commuter line, the New York Central's Putnam Division, operating between the Bronx and points in the county, served the region. With no direct connection to Grand Central Terminal (a transfer was required in the Bronx), ridership on the line was weak compared to its counterparts. Freight service was also scant. The line was eventually abandoned in waves between 1962 and 1980. The former railbed has been converted to trails, and now serves as the South County Trailway, North County Trailway, and Putnam County Trailway rail trails.

Putnam Transit, operated by the county, provides local public transportation.

In contrast to the surrounding counties, Putnam has no airport.

=== Major roadways ===
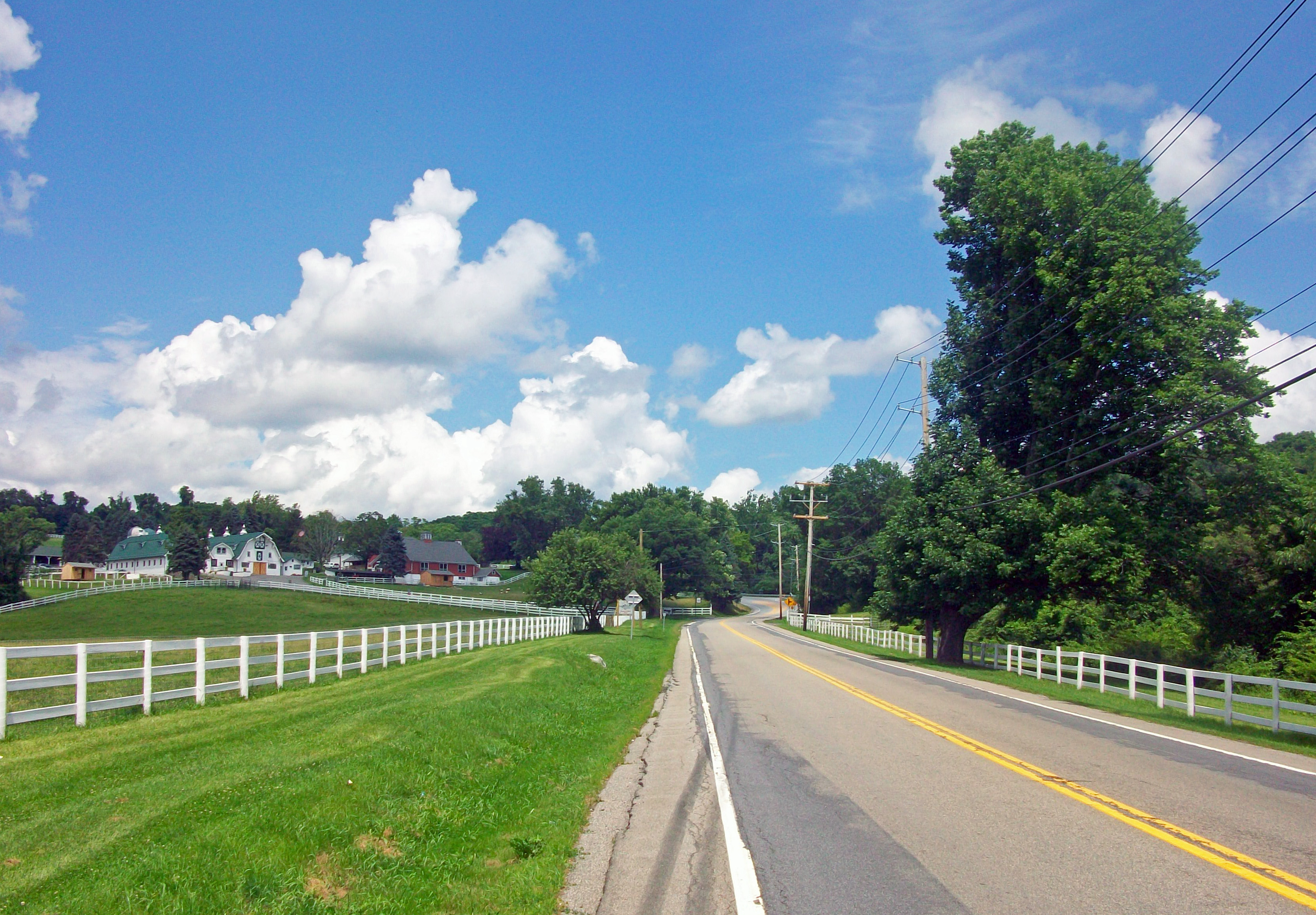
Route 312 along Tilly Foster Farm in Southeast

Putnam has two interstate highways. The east–west Interstate 84 comes in from the north near Ludingtonville, and connects to the southbound Interstate 684 in Southeast toward the Connecticut border. The Taconic State Parkway runs north–south through central Putnam. Three of the region's major east–west routes traverse the eastern half of the county. NY 52 enters alongside I-84 from Dutchess County, to end at US 6 south of Carmel. East of Brewster, US 6 joins US 202 and the routes leave the county and state concurrently aside the interstate.

- I-84
- I-684
- US 6
- US 9
- US 202
- NY 6N
- NY 9D
- NY 22
- NY 52
- NY 118
- NY 121
- NY 164
- NY 292
- NY 301
- NY 311
- NY 312
- NY 403
- Taconic State Parkway

== Points of interest ==
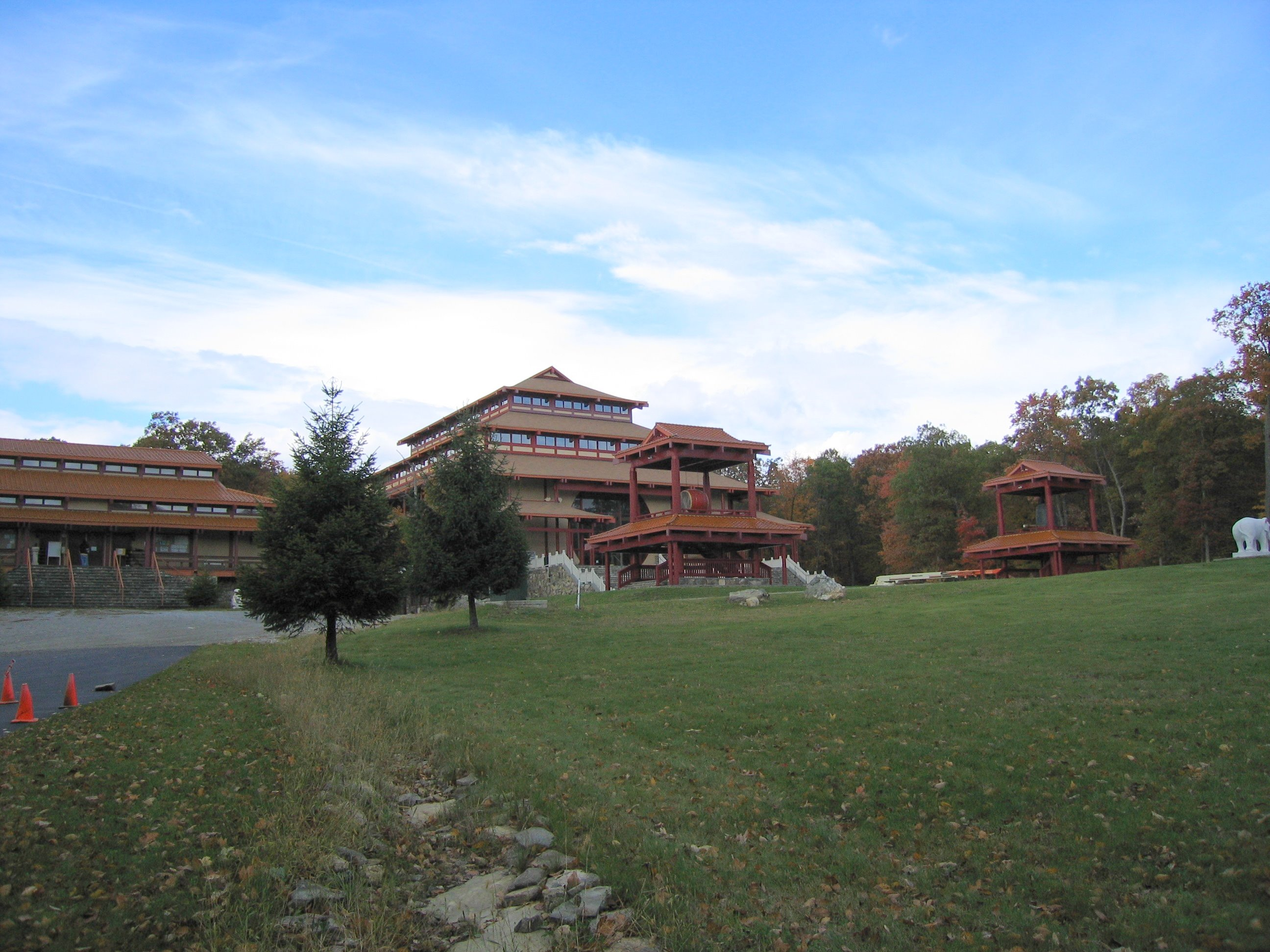
The Chuang Yen Monastery (莊嚴寺), in Kent, houses the largest indoor statue of Buddha in the Western Hemisphere.

Chuang Yen Monastery, located in Kent, is home to the largest indoor Buddha statue in the Western Hemisphere. It has the only library in the United States specializing in Buddhist history.

Clarence Fahnestock State Park is a 14,000-acre (57 km^{2}) natural area containing over 50 miles of trails for walking and hiking, including nine miles of the Appalachian Trail. Donald J. Trump State Park (currently closed) is a 436-acre (1.76 km^{2}) park located in Putnam and Westchester counties. A small ski resort, Thunder Ridge Ski Area, with 30 trails and three lifts is located in the town of Patterson.

== Media ==
The Journal News serves the region known as the Lower Hudson Valley, which comprises Westchester County, Rockland County, and Putnam County. The Journal News is owned by Gannett Company, Inc. Before Gannett merged its local dailies into the Journal News, Putnam County was served by an edition of the Reporter Dispatch.

Putnam County newsreaders were served for generations by the Putnam County News and Recorder, formerly an independently owned newspaper devoted to local affairs. The oversized broadsheet – measuring seventeen by twenty inches – was first published in Cold Spring as The Recorder in 1866. In July 2008, the local ownership sold the paper to Roger Ailes, chairman of Fox News, who named his wife Elizabeth as the new publisher. The paper altered its editorial content substantially, generating local controversy. In 2009 the Ailes family also purchased the Putnam County Courier, when it was shut down by Journal Register Co. (The first issue after publication resumed listed Roger Ailes as owner and chairman, but Elizabeth Ailes has since been identified as the owner). The Courier was first established as the Putnam County Democrat in 1841. Under Ailes ownership, the Courier closed its Carmel office. The News and Recorder remained a full broadsheet, with a 17-inch-wide front page, until 2017. Both newspapers are now standard-sized broadsheets. The two newspapers share an editor and many of the same stories appear in both. Douglas Cunningham, editor-in-chief of the Courier and News and Recorder since 2011, purchased the two papers from the Ailes in December 2016 and became publisher.

Two other weeklies are the Putnam County Times (historically Times & Republican) and Putnam County Press, virtually identical except that the former is distributed free. Both have been owned since 1958 by Don Hall. Hall and Roger Ailes, though both Republicans, are bitter rivals. Hall had long derided Ailes as a part-time resident. When Ailes faced harassment allegations, leading to his ouster from Fox News, his Putnam County connection contributed to his being featured on the front pages of the Times and Press.

In 2010, Gordon Stewart, a businessman living in Garrison, launched a news website to compete with the Ailes-owned PCNR called Philipstown.info. In 2012 a print version was launched called The Paper. Shortly Stewart's death in 2014, the publication became a nonprofit led by a board of directors. It changed its name in 2016 to The Highlands Current to reflect its coverage of neighboring Beacon.

== Communities ==
There are six towns and three incorporated villages in Putnam County. There are no cities:

=== Towns ===
==== Carmel ====
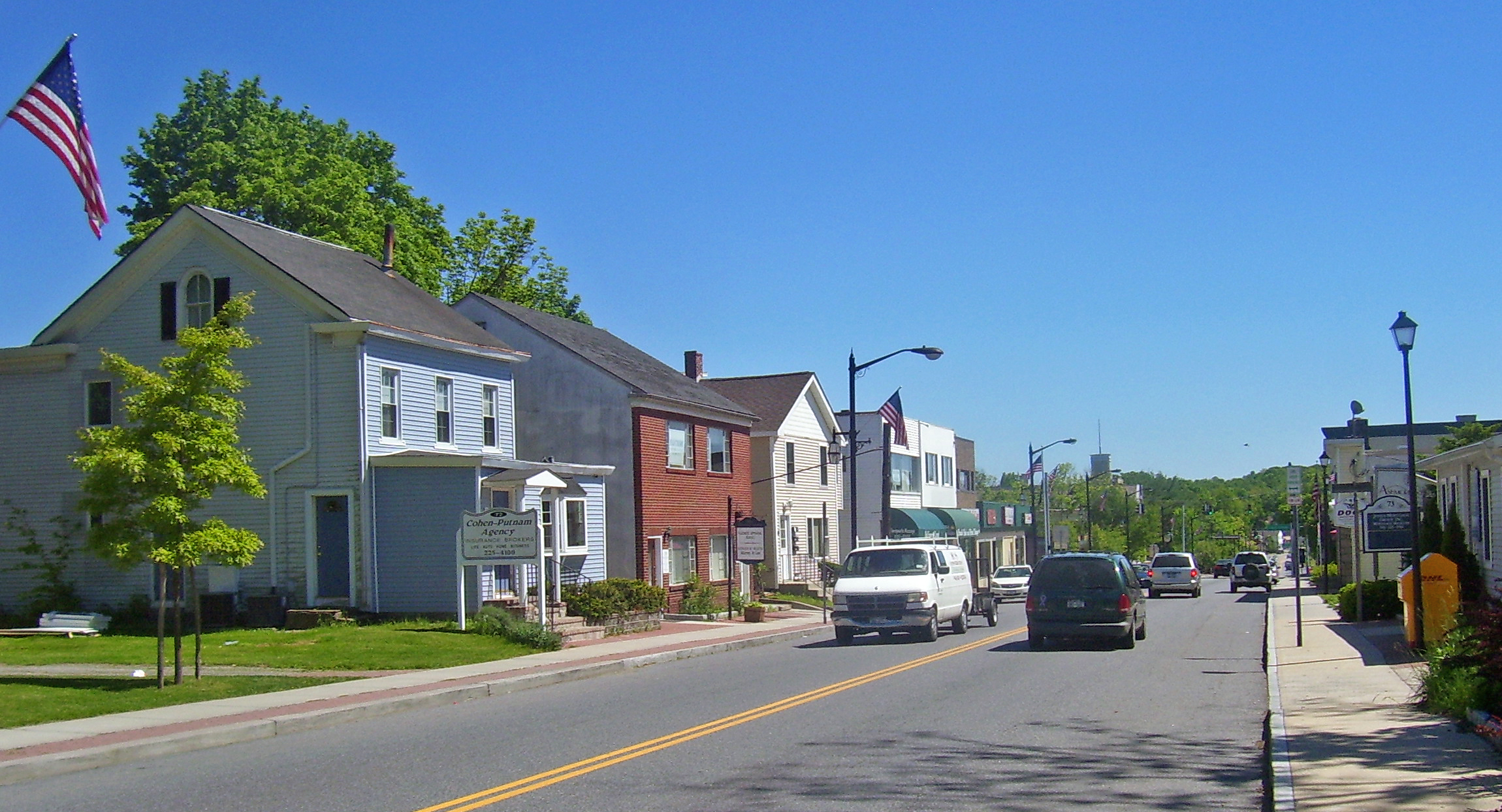
Downtown Carmel

Carmel is the largest town of Putnam County, with a population of 33,576. The Town of Carmel includes the hamlets of the county seat Carmel, Carmel Hills, Field Corners, Hopkins Corners, Mahopac, Mahopac Falls, Secor Corners, Tilly Foster, and West Mahopac. Carmel is along the southern border of Putnam County.

Carmel is known for its historic courthouse and high school, which serves grades 9–12. Carmel was taken in 1795 from Frederickstown, a town which encompassed the present towns of Kent, Patterson, and Carmel.

==== Kent ====
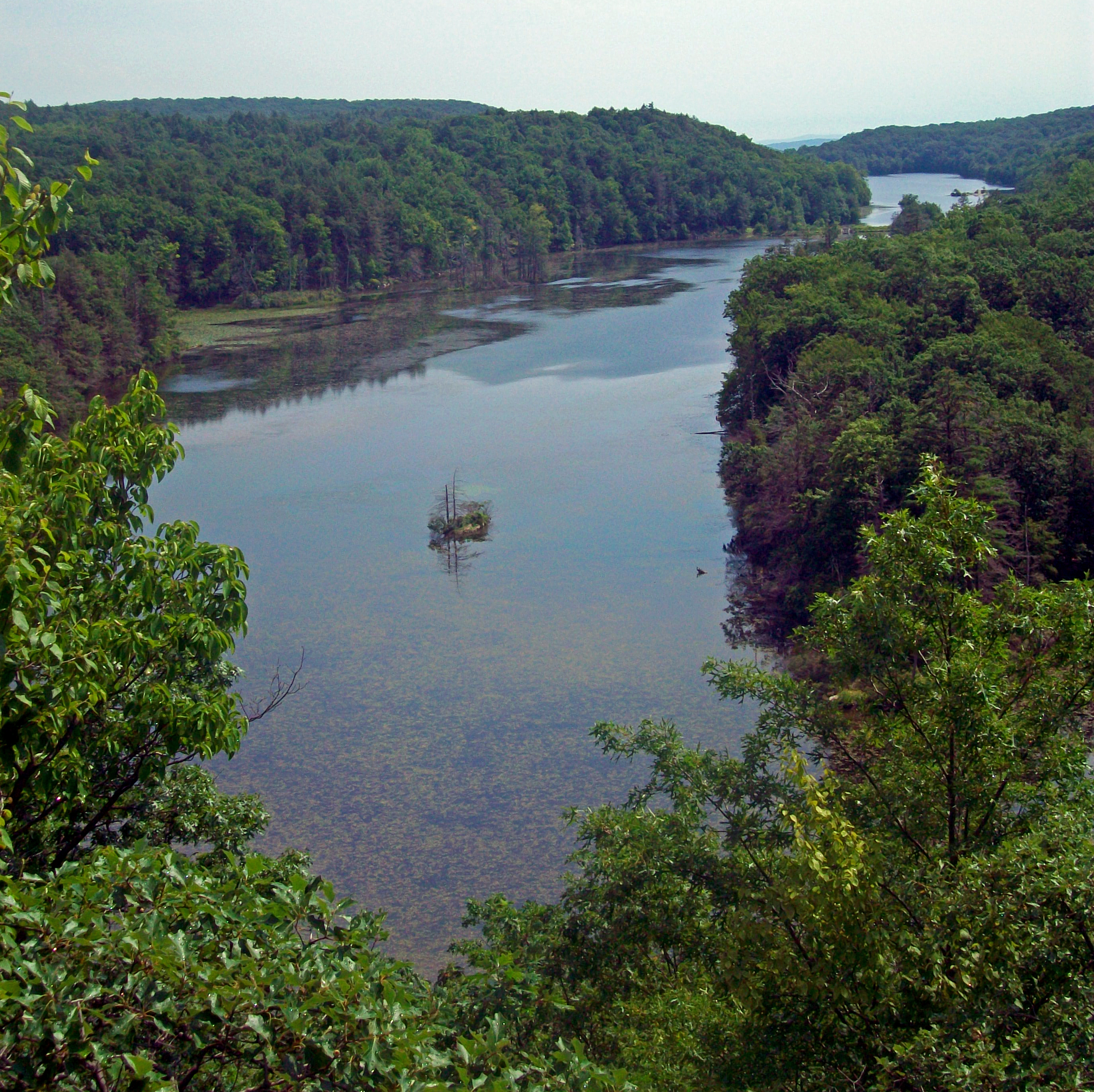
Canopus Lake in Clarence Fahnestock Memorial State Park, lying in part in Kent

Kent is a town located along the northern border of Putnam with a population of 12,900. Coles Mills was settled in 1747 at the outlet of Barrett Pond into the West Branch of the Croton River. Kent contains the hamlets of Lake Carmel, Kent Corners, Kent Hills, and Ludingtonville. Kent was the last remaining section of Frederickstown, after the towns of Carmel and Patterson were divided from it in 1795. Frederickstown was founded in 1788.

==== Patterson ====
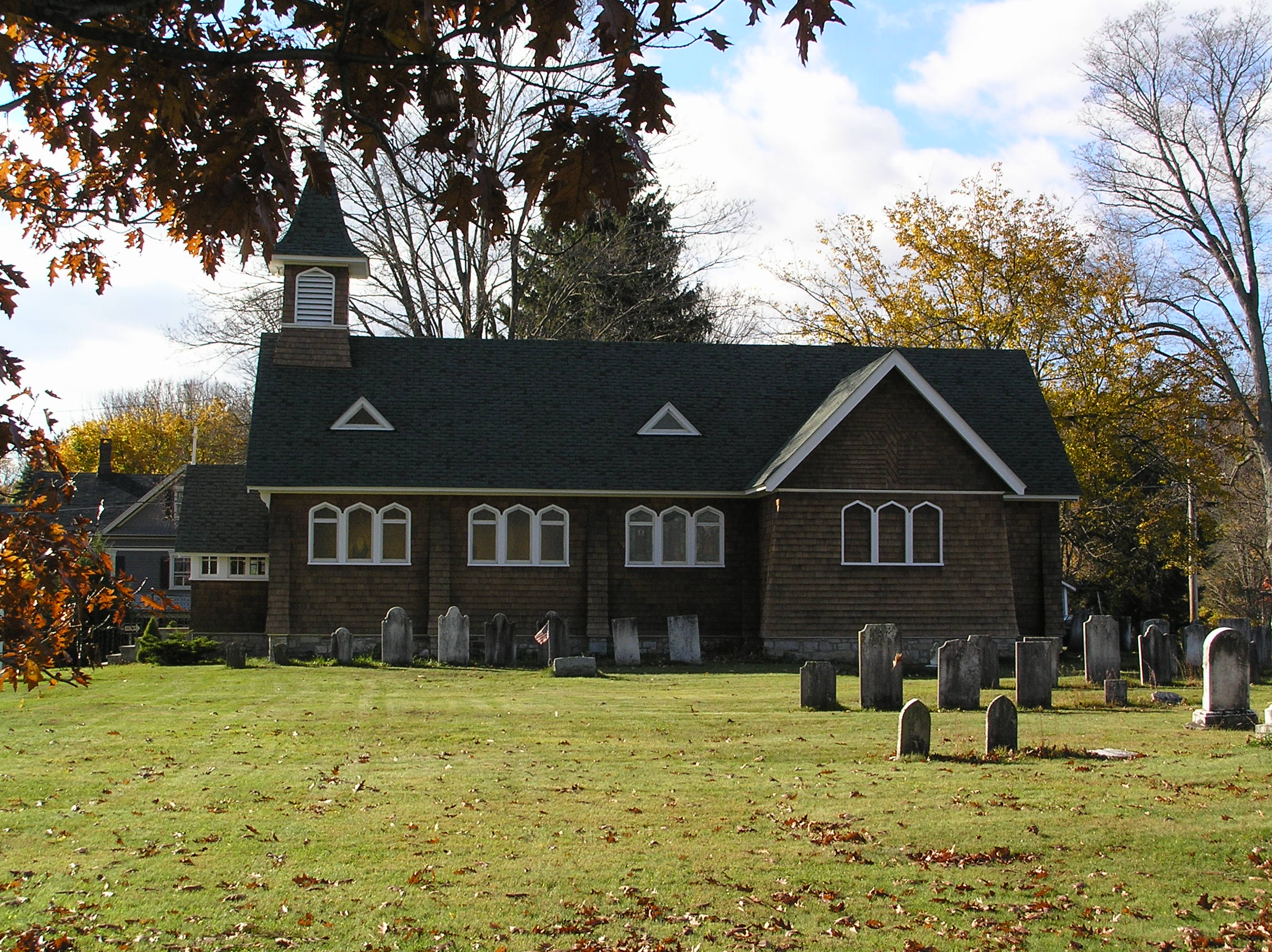
A church in Patterson

The Town of Patterson is located in the northeast area of Putnam County and has a population of 11,541. Patterson, originally named Franklin, was divided from the former town of Frederickstown, in 1795. Patterson contains the hamlets of Patterson, Barnum Corners, Camp Brady, Fields Corners, Haines Corners, Haviland Hollow, Putnam Lake, Steinbeck Corners, Towners, and West Patterson.

==== Philipstown ====
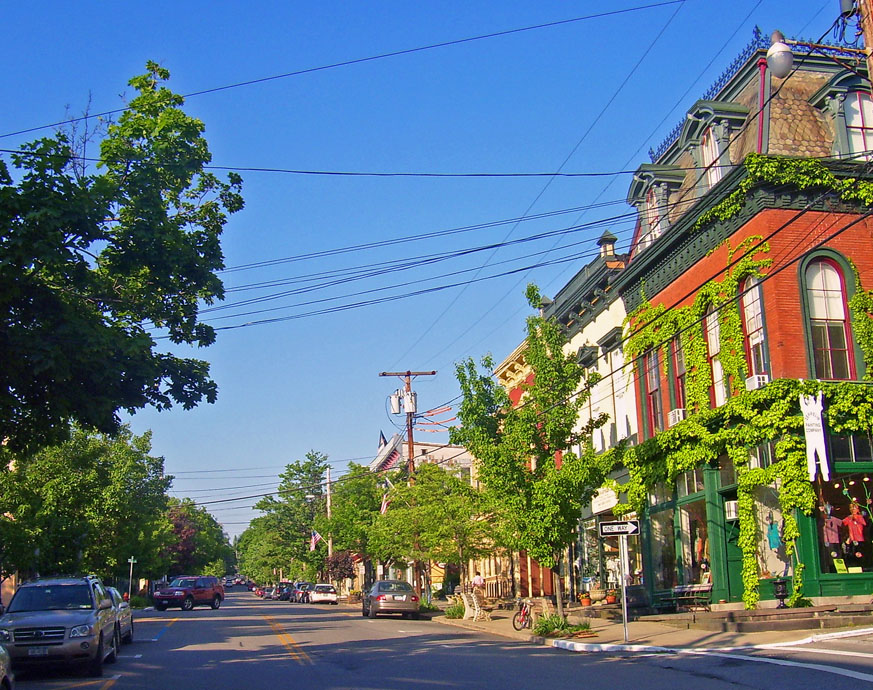
Cold Spring's Main Street, part of the federally recognized historic district in the village within the town of Philipstown

Philipstown is a town located along the western end of Putnam County and it has a population of 9,831. Philipstown contains the villages and hamlets of Cold Spring, Forsonville, Garrison, Garrison Four Corners, Glenclyffe, Manitou, McKeel Corners, Nelsonville, North Highlands, Storm King, and the north side of Continental Village. It was founded in 1788. West Point (in Orange County) is located across the Hudson River from the village of Cold Spring. It has three stations on the Metro North Railroad Hudson line: in Garrison, Cold Spring and Manitou, which has limited train service.

Two public libraries are located in Philipstown: the Desmond-Fish Library in Garrison and the Julia L. Butterfield Library in Cold Spring.

==== Putnam Valley ====
Putnam Valley is a town located on the southern border of Putnam County with a population of 11,762. It is the third largest town in the county. Putnam Valley contains the hamlets of Adams Corners, Christian Corners, Gilbert Corners, Lake Peekskill, Oscawana Corners, Putnam Valley, Tompkins Corners, Sunnybrook.

Putnam Valley was created in 1835 as the Town Of Quincy, taking its current name the following year. The town was created by splitting off from Philipstown. Putnam Valley is home to the Clarence Fahnestock State Park, which covers much of Putnam County and some of Dutchess County.

==== Southeast ====
The Town of Southeast is located in the southeastern corner of Putnam County, with a population of 18,058. It was founded in 1788 as one of the three original towns in what would later become Putnam County. Its shape changed greatly in 1795, when it lost its northern half to Patterson and gained a great amount on its western side.

It is the second-largest town in Putnam County, second only to Carmel. The crossroads of Interstate highways 684 and 84; State Routes 22 and 312; and US Highways 6 and 202 are located here. Metro-North Railroad's Harlem Line has two stops that service the area, at Brewster Village and Southeast Station (formerly Brewster North) off Route 312. Southeast contains the village of Brewster, and the hamlets of Brewster Hill, Brewster Heights, Deans Corners, DeForest Corners, Drewville Heights, Dykemans, Milltown, Peach Lake, Sears Corners, and Sodom.

=== Villages ===
==== Brewster ====
Brewster is an incorporated village within the Town of Southeast.

==== Cold Spring ====
Cold Spring is an incorporated village within the Town of Philipstown, bordering the village of Nelsonville.

==== Nelsonville ====
Nelsonville is an incorporated village within the Town of Philipstown, bordering the village of Cold Spring.

=== Census-designated places ===
- Brewster Heights
- Brewster Hill
- Carmel
- Lake Carmel
- Mahopac
- Peach Lake (shared with Westchester County)
- Putnam Lake

=== Other hamlets ===
- Dykemans
- Farmers Mills
- Garrison
- Gayville
- Lake Peekskill
- Ludingtonville
- Milltown
- Sodom
- Tompkins Corners

=== Ghost towns ===
- Coles Mills
- Dicktown
- Doanesburgh
- Towners

== See also ==
- The 25th Annual Putnam County Spelling Bee
- Downstate New York
- Hudson Valley
- List of counties in New York
- National Register of Historic Places listings in Putnam County, New York
- New York metropolitan area
- Putnam Transit
