= Milltown, New York =

Hamlet in Southeast, New York, United States

- Hamlet
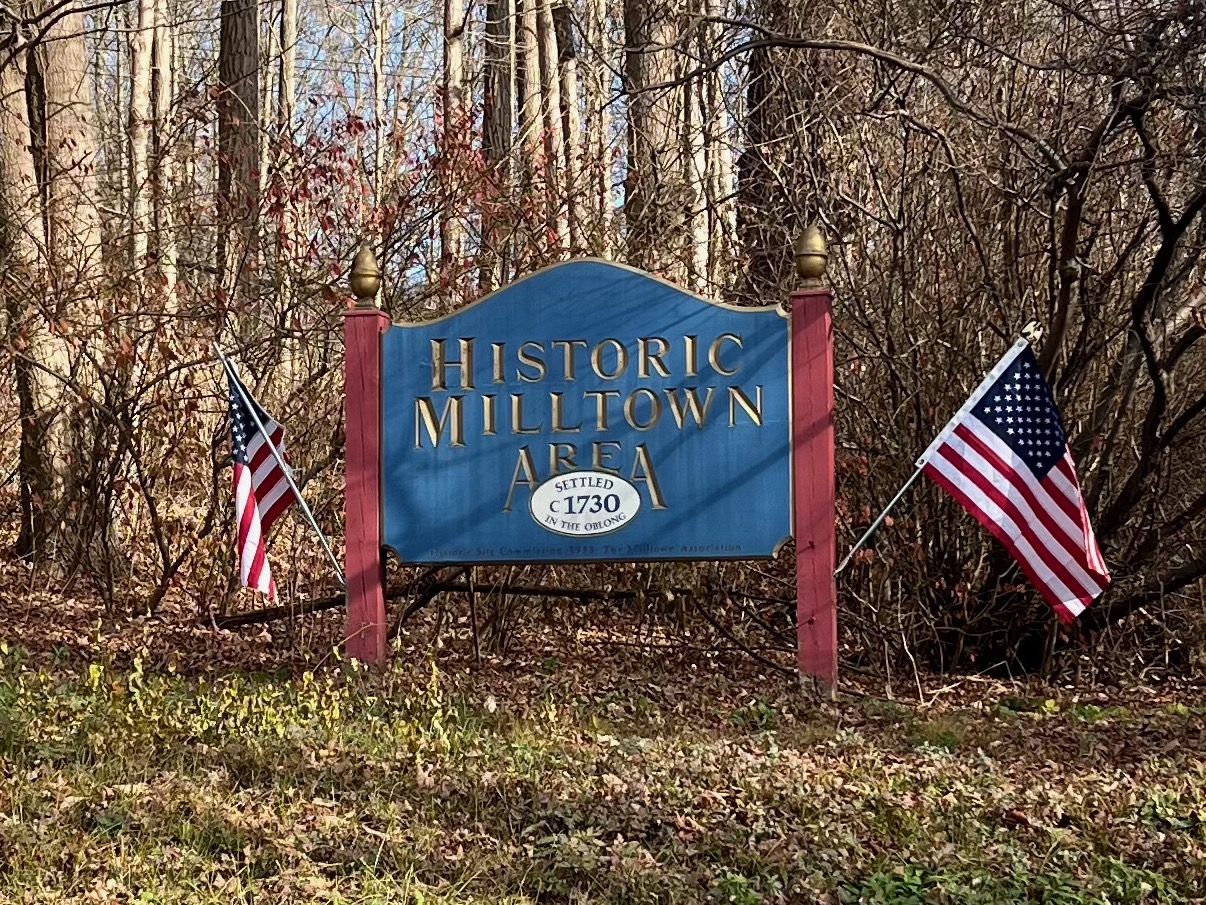

- Location within New York Location within the United States
- Coordinates: 41°24′45.34″N 73°33′36.45″W
- Country: United States
- State: New York
- County: Putnam
- Town: Southeast
- Elevation: 436 ft (133 m)
- Time zone: UTC-5 (Eastern (EST))
  - Summer (DST): UTC-4 (EDT)
- ZIP Code: 10509
- Area codes: 845
- GNIS feature ID: 972803

Milltown is a hamlet in the town of Southeast located in Putnam County, New York, United States. It is in the easternmost part of town, bordering the city of Danbury, Connecticut.

== History ==
Located on the Croton River, Milltown took its name from the mills built along its banks. The first settlers to the area arrived in 1679. At this time, Milltown sat in the middle of the Oblong, a long-disputed strip of land between New York and Connecticut.

Southeast's first library was established here in 1825, operating out of Asa Raymond's general store & post office. It would eventually be given the name Columbia Library, until the entire collection was sold at auction. The post office was in service from 1826 to 1867.

Milltown is also the site of what local historians believe to be the oldest house in all of Putnam County. The Gage House, a saltbox farmhouse, was built in 1719. It is now an apothecary and center for spiritual healing.

The Milltown Historic District was established in 1988. Three years later, a sign marking the "Historic Milltown Area" was installed at Milltown and Federal Hill Road.

== Geography ==
Milltown is situated along the East Branch of the Croton River, which flows into the East Branch Reservoir. This is one of 12 reservoirs that feed New York City's Croton Water Supply System. To create the reservoir, a dam was constructed in 1890 and the western section of Milltown was flooded as a result. In times when water levels have been significantly low, remnants of nineteenth century Milltown, such as stone walls, home foundations, and roads, have been made visible.

On the other side of Milltown is the exclusive and mysterious Morefar Golf Course. The 500 acres (2.0 km^{2}) extend from New York into the Joes Hill / Mill Plain section of Danbury.
