= Paterson railway station =

Paterson railway station may refer to:

- Paterson railway station (Manitoba), a Via Rail flag stop station in Canada
- Paterson railway station, New South Wales, on the North Coast line in Australia
- Paterson station, an NJT station in New Jersey, United States

== See also ==
- Patterson station (disambiguation)
