= Housatonic Area Regional Transit =

Transportation provider in and around Danbury, Connecticut

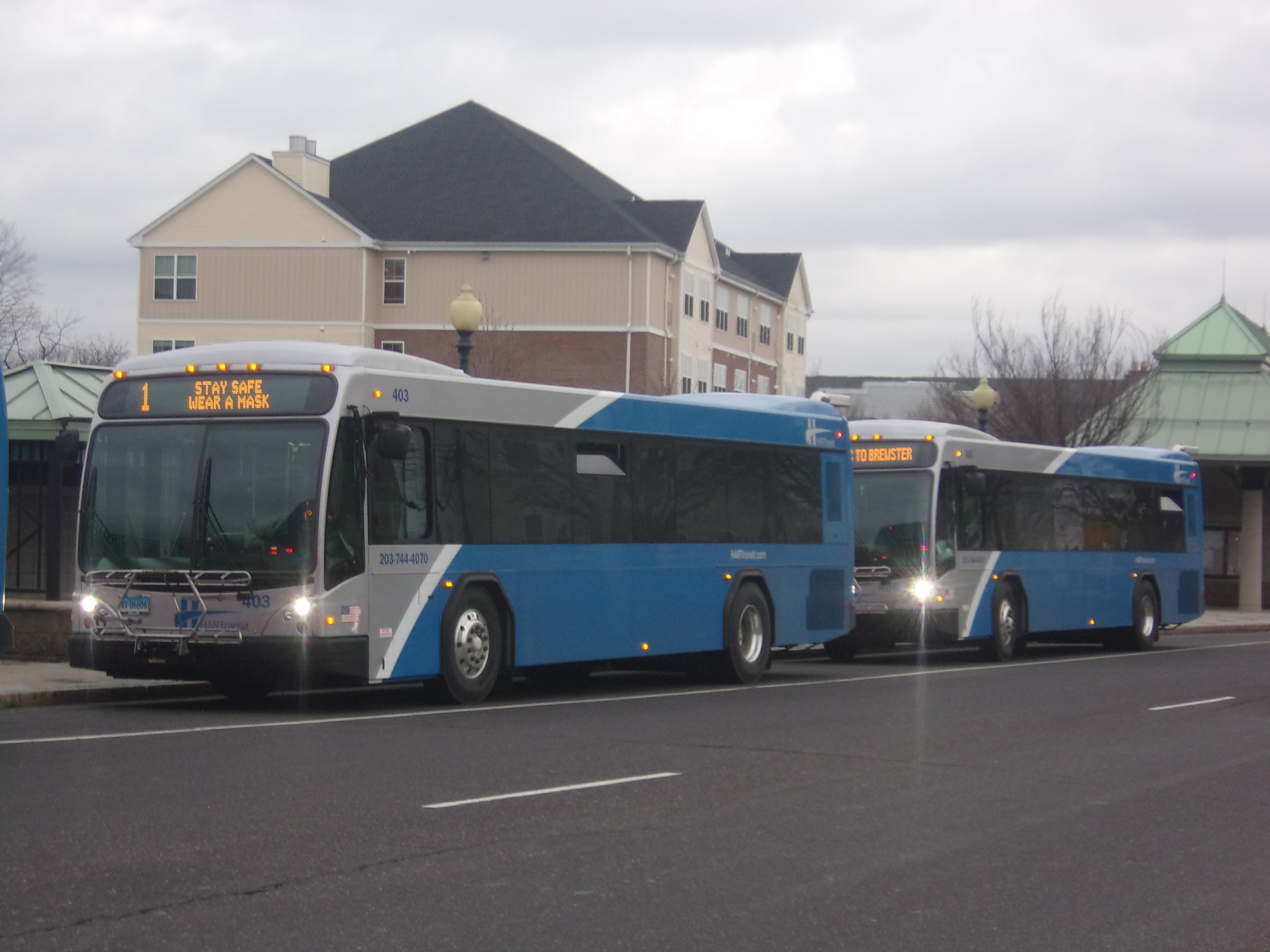
- 2019 Gillig BRT 400 series in Danbury
- Parent: Housatonic Area Regional Transit
- Founded: 1972
- Headquarters: 62 Federal Road; Danbury, Connecticut 06810
- Service area: Greater Danbury, and surrounding areas
- Service type: Local and shuttle bus service
- Routes: 15
- Fleet: 28 fixed route 34 paratransit (2009 figures)
- Daily ridership: 3,378 (weekday); 1,539 (Saturday); 458 (Sunday)
- Operator: HARTransit
- Website: www.hartransit.com

Housatonic Area Regional Transit, known popularly as HARTransit (formerly as HART), is the provider of public transportation for Danbury, Connecticut and surrounding communities. HARTransit was founded in 1972 as the Danbury-Bethel Transit District by the two municipalities. The name was changed to Housatonic Area Regional Transit in 1979 after the addition of other municipal members. The agency receives funding from municipal contracts, the Connecticut Department of Transportation, Federal Transit Administration and (on a limited basis) the New York State Department of Transportation. Prior to HARTransit's establishment, Danbury had gone without transit service since 1967 when the privately owned ABC Bus Company which had replaced the Candlewood Bus Company a few months before, ceased operations. The first local bus transit operator in the area, Danbury Power & Transportation Company, operated bus services in Danbury and Bethel from 1926 to 1965. HARTransit provides service to a greater number of towns than its predecessors.

In 2009, HARTransit was recognized as the Urban Community Transportation System of the Year by the Community Transportation Association of America (CTAA).

The municipalities served by HARTransit are as follows:

- Connecticut: Danbury, Bethel, Brookfield, New Fairfield, New Milford, Newtown, Bethel, Redding, and Ridgefield. Norwalk and Wilton also see limited HARTransit service but are served primarily by the Norwalk Transit District WHEELS Services.
- New York: Brewster, Katonah, Lewisboro and Southeast. Brewster and Southeast are also served by PART, while Katonah is primarily served by the Bee-Line Bus System.

== Services ==
HART currently provides the following services:

- Urban Fixed Route: HART operates 7 urban fixed routes which run on a "pulse point" system in which all buses meet at a terminal in downtown Danbury to easily facilitate transfers. The site is near the Danbury Metro-North station
  - 1 Hospital/Town Park
  - 2 Stony Hill Road/Newtown Road
  - 3 Mill Plain/Brewster
  - 4 Brookfield
  - 5 Bethel Center
  - 6 Danbury Fair Mall/Lake Avenue
  - 7 New Milford
- 15 Danbury-Norwalk Route 7 Link, operated formerly along with WHEELS, is a weekday-only commuter line which connects Danbury to Norwalk and communities along the Route 7 corridor now solely run by HARTransit.
- SweetHART: HARTransit operates ADA paratransit service for the disabled which parallels the hours and service area of the fixed route system. This service is not offered to those in WHEELS territory or New York. HARTransit also operates Senior (65 or older)/disabled SweetHART dial-a-ride service for Bethel, Brookfield, Danbury, Newtown, New Fairfield and Ridgefield. Dial-a-ride hours and policies vary by municipality.
- Bus to Rail Service: Peak hour shuttles which connect Danbury to the Brewster station on the Harlem Line and Ridgefield to Katonah, also on the Harlem Line. A third shuttle, connecting New Fairfield to Southeast, began operations in 2009.
  - 12 Danbury-Brewster
  - 16 Ridgefield-Katonah
  - 14 New Fairfield-Southeast
- Nighttime/Sunday LOOP services: Four routes serving Danbury, New Milford, Brookfield and Bethel which operate during nighttime hours and on Sundays and holidays to offer increased economic opportunities to low-income workers though anyone can use these services.
  - 8 Mall-Mill Plain Road LOOP
  - 9 New Milford LOOP
  - 10 Rose Hill- Hospital LOOP
  - 17 Stony Hill-Newtown Road LOOP

== Fleet ==
HARTransit's fleet is made up of Gillig fixed-route buses (35' BRT Low Floor series and a single low floor trolley) and Ford cutaway minibuses with Goshen Coach and StarTrans bodies. In the past, Orion buses were also a part of the fleet, specifically the Orion V (some of which were formerly owned by Bee-Line Bus System in Westchester County, New York) and the Orion VII. In addition, HARTransit formerly operated RTS buses.

=== Gallery ===
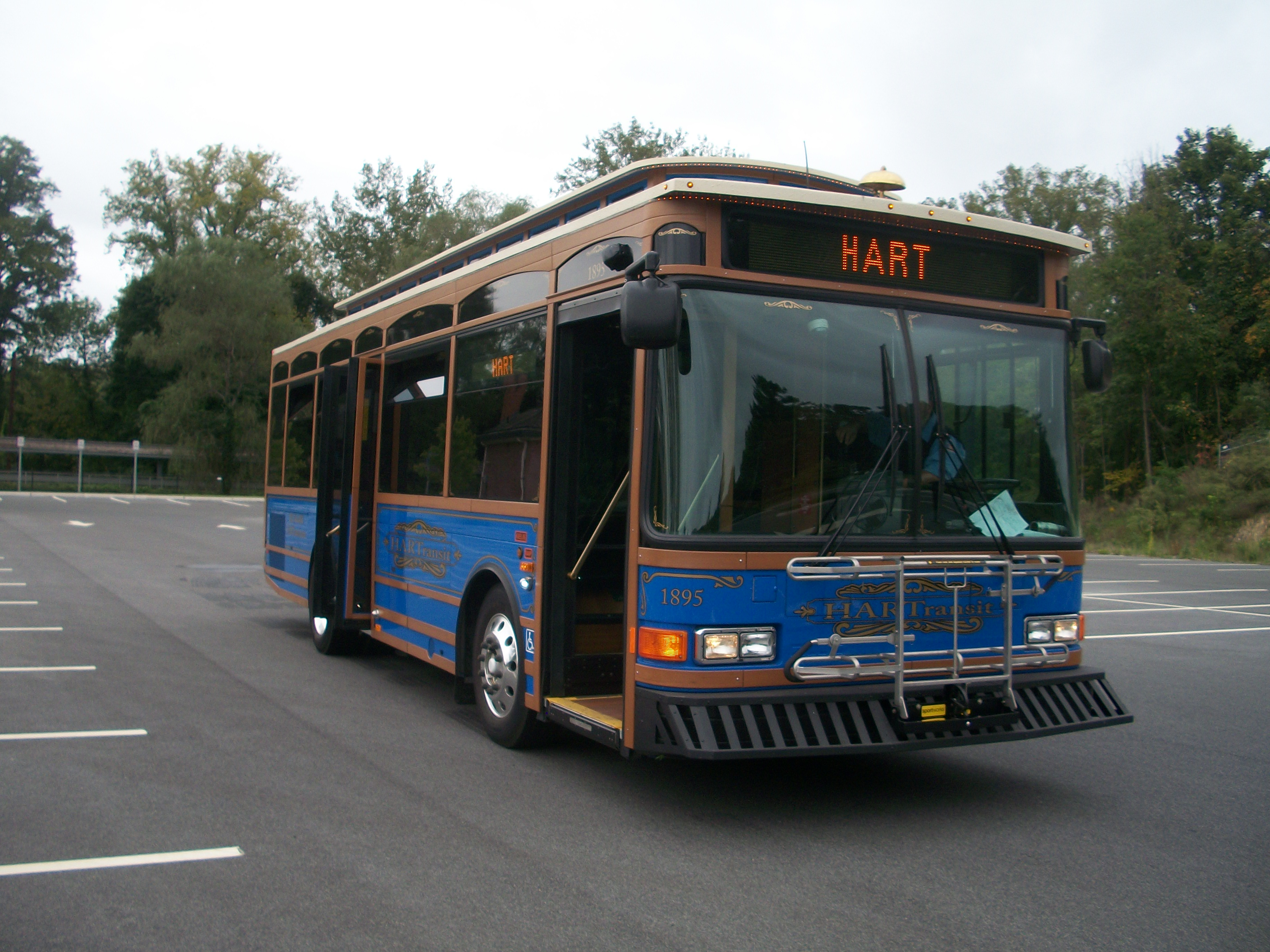
A Gillig Low Floor trolley replica

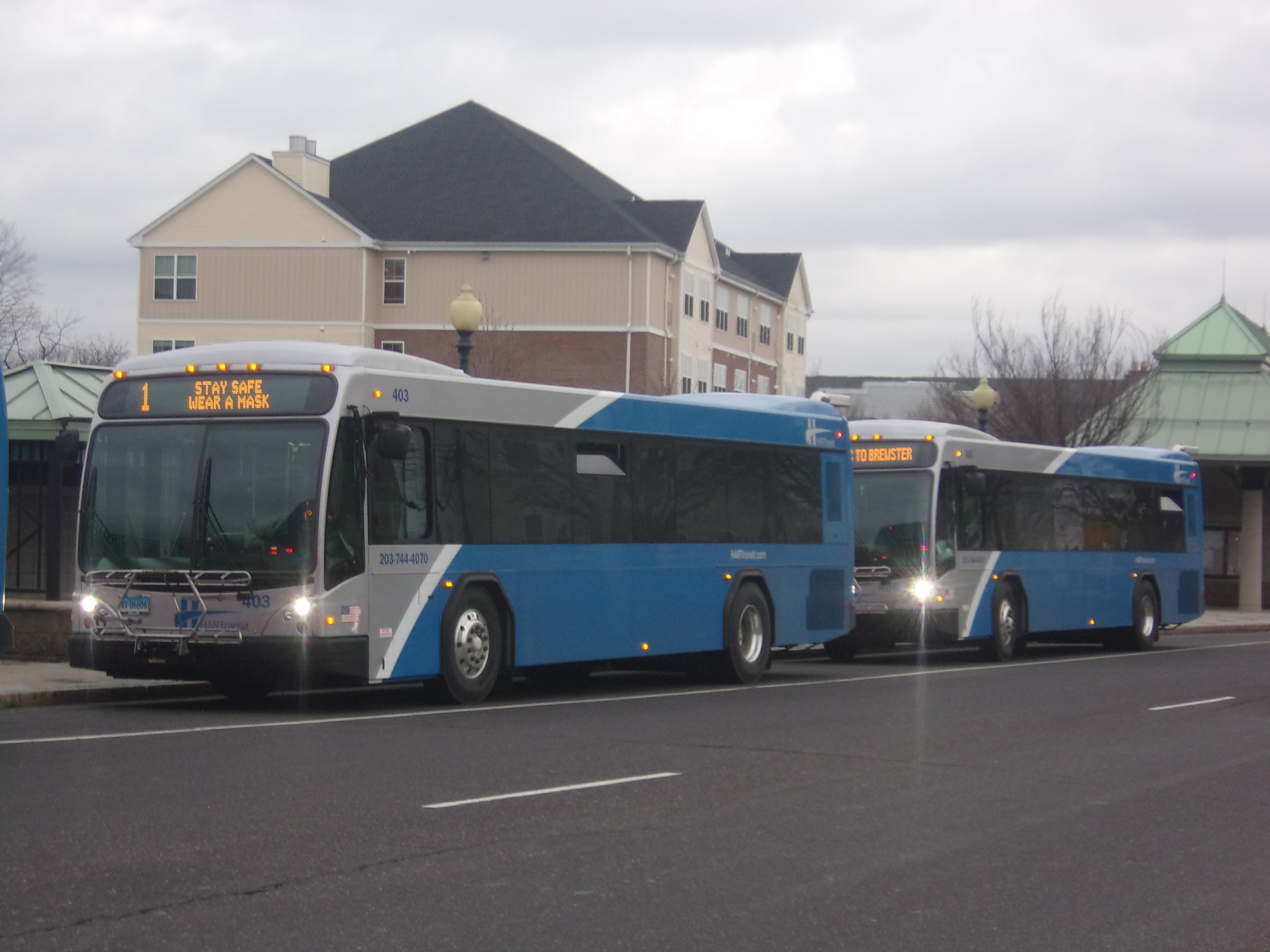
Two Gillig BRTs

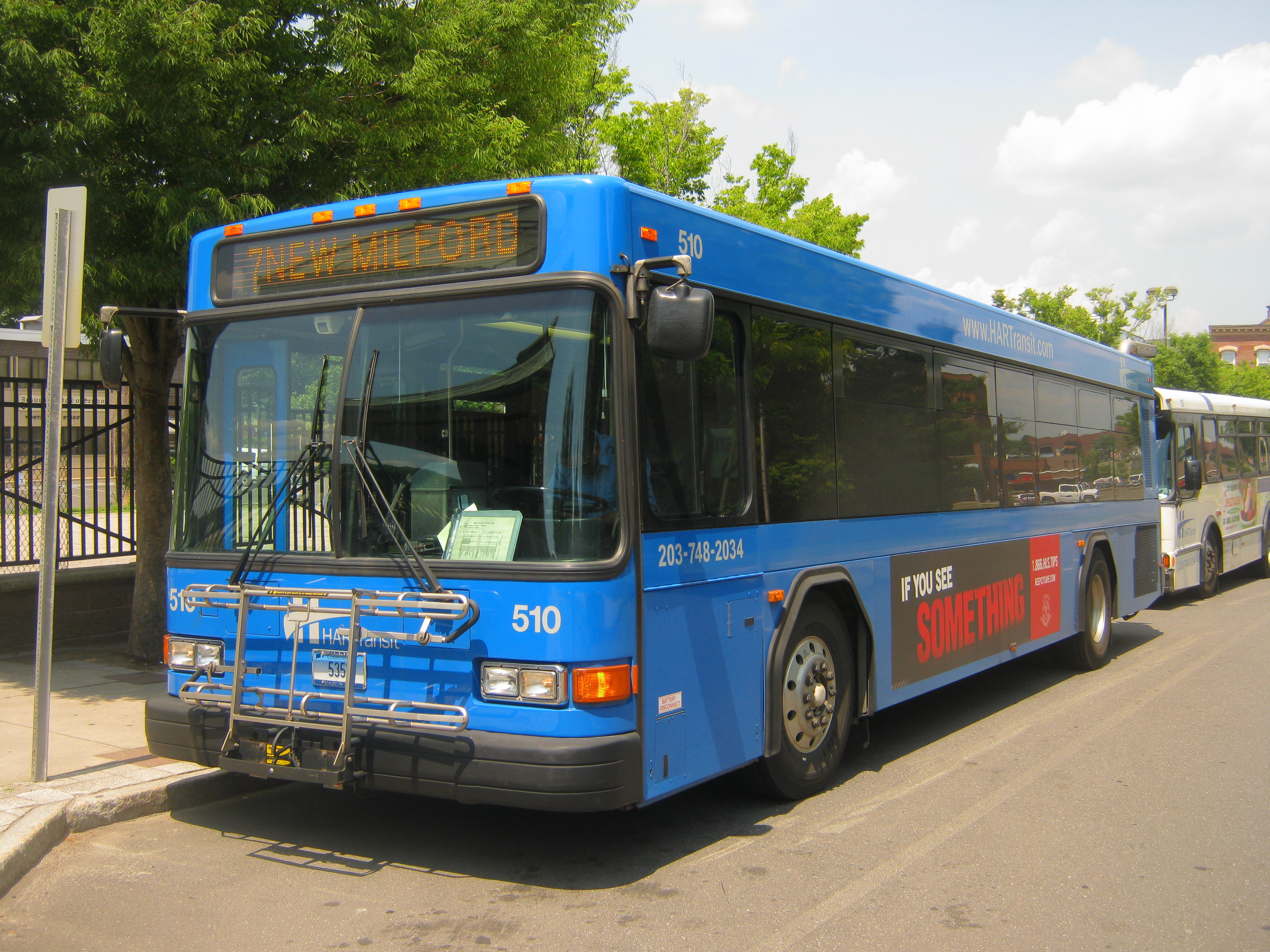
A now-retired Gillig Low Floor

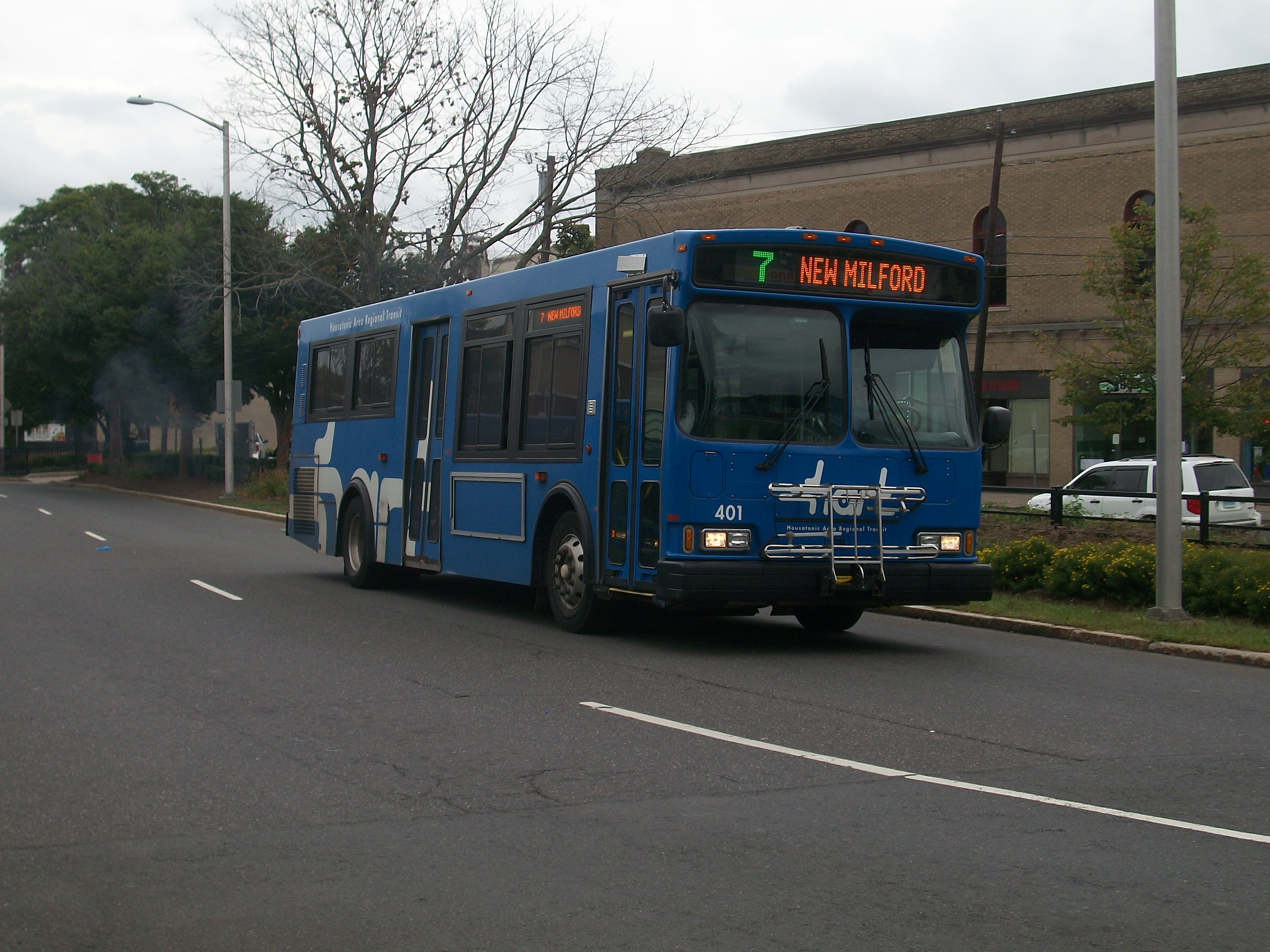
A now-retired Orion VII

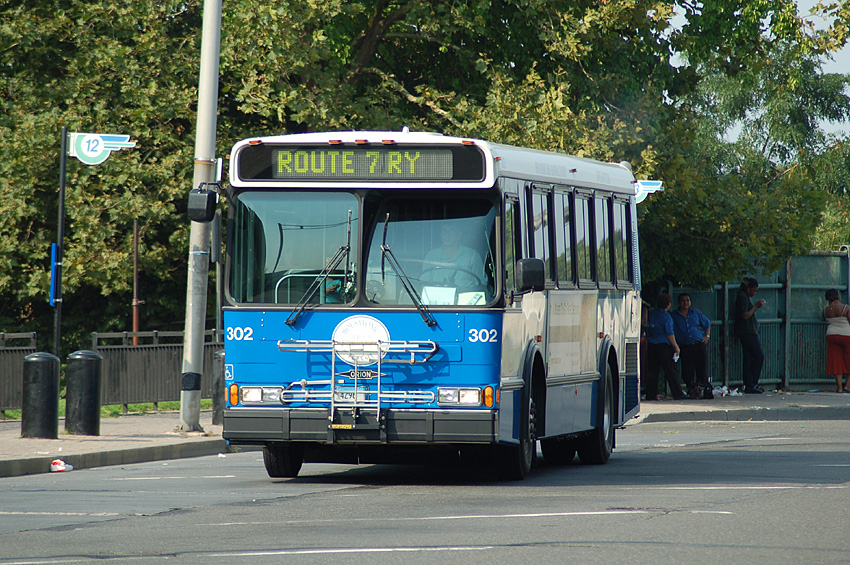
A now-retired Orion V

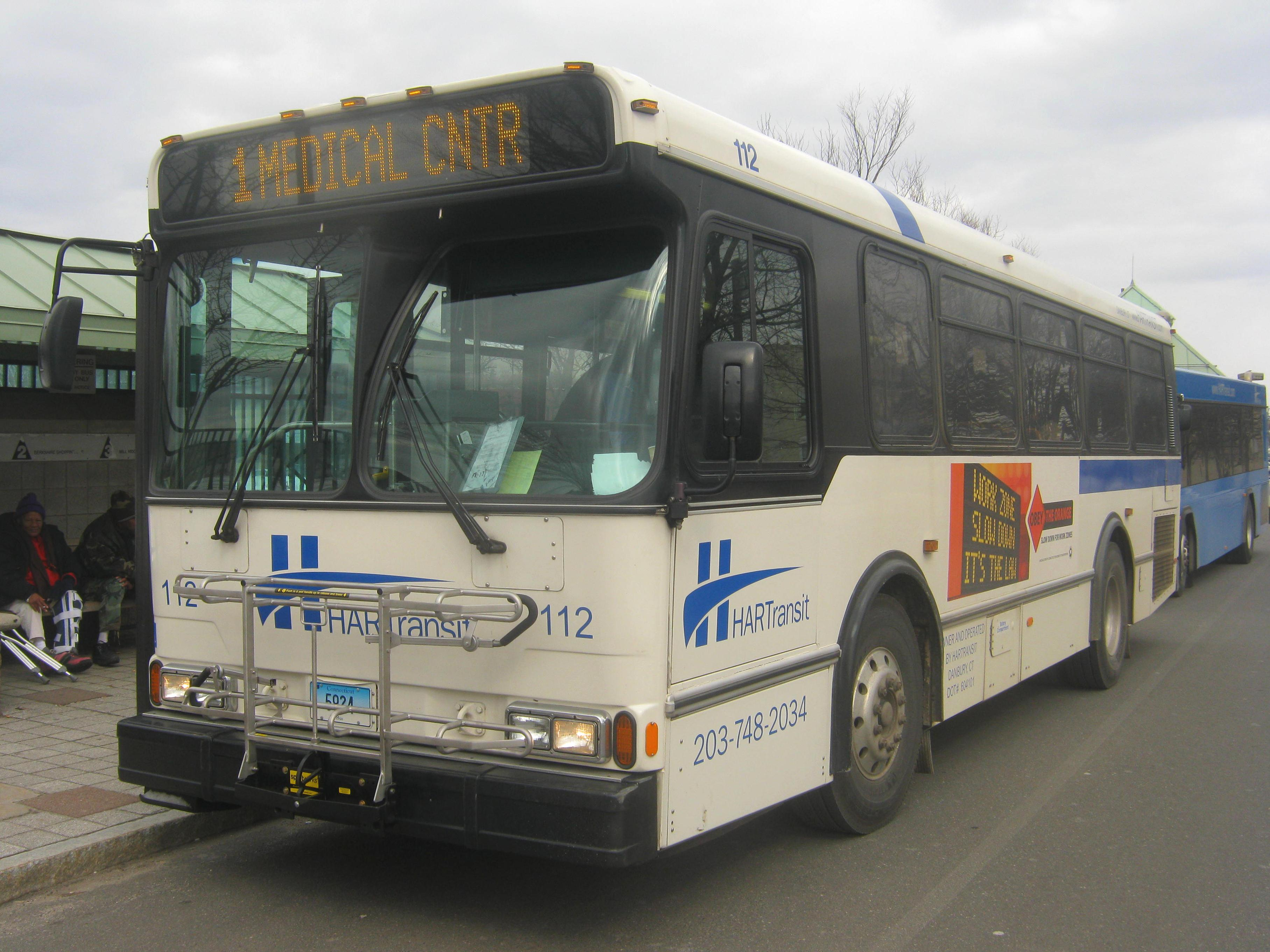
A now-retired Orion V, formerly owned by Bee-Line Bus System

== See also ==
- Norwalk Transit District
- Putnam Transit
- Bee-Line Bus System
