= Patterson station (Metro-North) =

Metro-North Railroad station in New York

Patterson
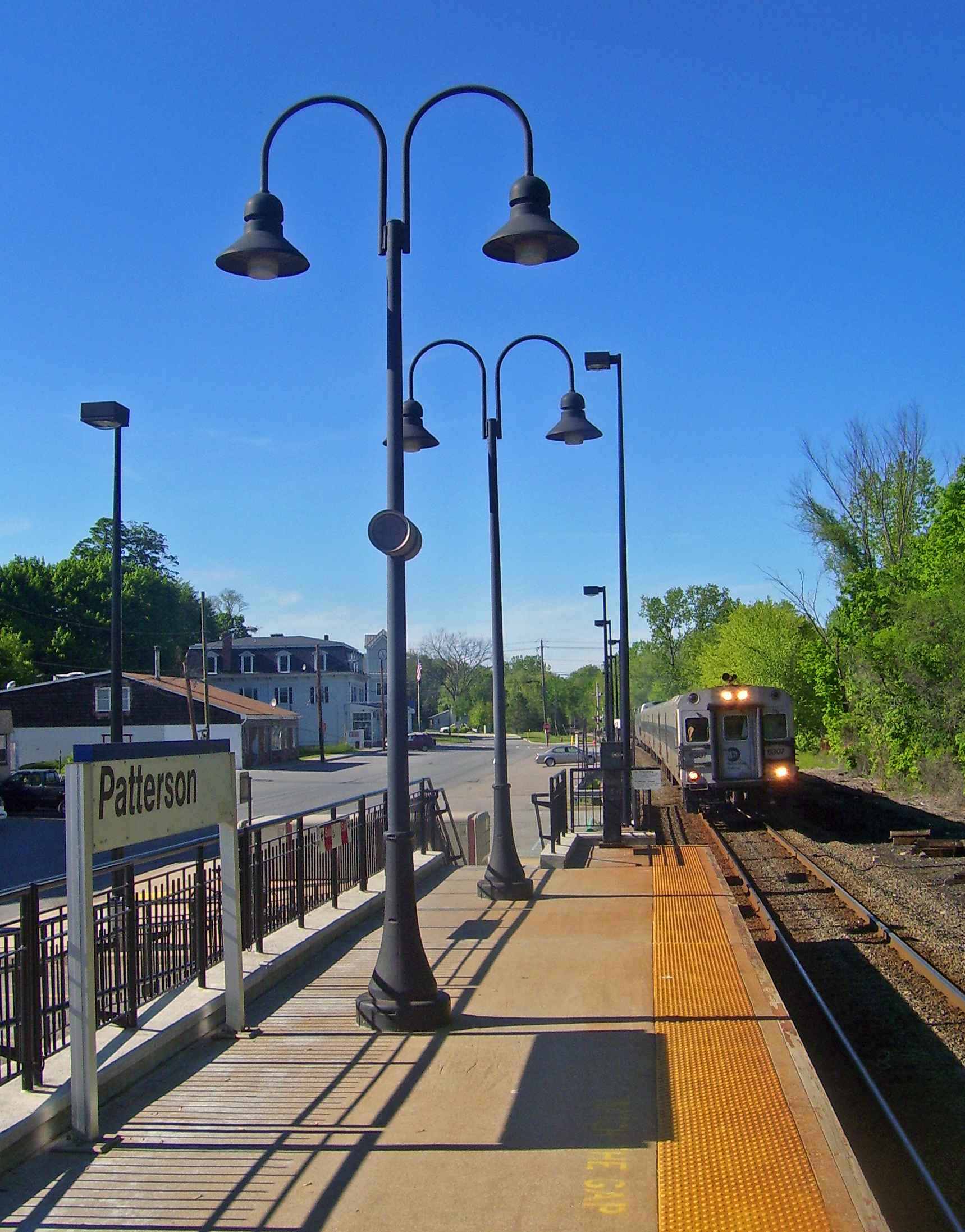
- Southbound train approaching Patterson station

General information
- Location: 1 Front Street, Patterson, New York
- Coordinates: 41.51174°N 73.60428°W
- Line: Harlem Line
- Platforms: 1 side platform
- Tracks: 1
- Connections: Putnam Transit: Putnam On-Demand Microtransit

Other information
- Fare zone: 8

History
- Opened: December 31, 1848

Key dates
- June 1959: Station agent eliminated

Passengers
- 2018: 110 (Metro-North)
- Rank: 99 of 109

Services
Preceding station	Metro-North Railroad	Following station
Southeast Terminus	Harlem Line	Pawling toward Wassaic
Southeast toward Grand Central	Harlem Line	Pawling toward Wassaic

Former services
Preceding station	New York Central Railroad	Following station
Towner's toward New York	Harlem Division	Pawling toward Chatham
Location

Patterson station is a commuter rail stop on the Metro-North Railroad's Harlem Line, located in Patterson, New York.

It is the northernmost station on the line in Putnam County, and the first station beyond the end of electrification.

== History ==
The New York and Harlem Railroad built their main line through Patterson towards Dover Plains in 1848, when Patterson station opened. NY&H was acquired by the New York Central and Hudson River Railroad in 1864 and eventually taken over by the New York Central Railroad. On August 3, 1952, a derailment of milk cars and other freight at the station took place, which resulted in no injuries or deaths, but nevertheless damaged the station and startled the community. As with most of the Harlem Line, the merger of New York Central with Pennsylvania Railroad in 1968 transformed the station into a Penn Central Railroad station. Penn Central's continuous financial despair throughout the 1970s forced them to turn over their commuter service to the Metropolitan Transportation Authority, who eventually converted into a Metro-North station in 1983.

== Station layout ==
The station consists of a four-car-long high-level side platform to the west of the track.
