= Gayville, Oswego County, New York =

Gayville, New York
- hamlet
- Location within the state of New York
- Coordinates: 43°18′22″N 76°0′50″W
- Country: United States
- State: New York
- County: Oswego
- Time zone: UTC-5 (Eastern (EST))
  - Summer (DST): UTC-4 (EDT)

Gayville is a hamlet lying five miles (8 km) north of the hamlet of Constantia in the town of Constantia in Oswego County, New York, United States.

Gayville centers upon the intersection of County Route 23, County Route 23A, and Grannis Road. Within Gayville Potter Creek joins Scriba Creek, which flows southward to empty into Oneida Lake.

== History ==
Before the American Revolution, the eastern portion of what is now Oswego County was part of the territory of the Oneida Nation. Although there were no known settlements in the region, the Oneidas used the land for hunting and fishing. Oneida Lake provided their principal means of transportation. To reach Lake Ontario, approximately twenty miles (32 km) north of Oneida Lake, they would canoe up Scriba Creek. About six miles (10 km) north, where Scriba Creek bears eastward, they began an eight-mile (13 km) portage, traveling overland to Little Salmon Creek, which took them to Lake Ontario. This route was preferable to continuing to the end of Oneida Lake, down the Onondaga River (now known as the Oneida River), and down the Oswego River. The Oswego River route was approximately sixty miles (97 km) longer, and it passed the rapids at Oswego Falls (now known as Fulton) and ended at the military fortifications of Fort Ontario and Fort Oswego.

After the Revolution, the government of New York acquired vast inland territories from the Oneida Nation and sold the land to speculators. George Scriba, born in Germany and a naturalized citizen of New York, purchased 500,000 acres (2,000 km^{2}) of land in what is still known as Scriba's Patent. He established two villages that were to serve as ports: on Oneida Lake, at the mouth of Scriba Creek, he built Rotterdam, now known as Constantia. On Lake Ontario, at the mouth of Little Salmon Creek, he built Vera Cruz, near the present-day hamlet of Texas. He had a road cut through the forests between the two settlements. This road paralleled Scriba Creek, followed the route of the Oneida Nation portage, and paralleled Little Salmon Creek. Although it was never accomplished, he also envisioned creating a canal along the Oneida Nation portage between the two creeks.

Among the many hamlets of farming families that developed along the route of the Rotterdam-Vera Cruz road was Gayville. Its name came from early landowners Erastus and Charlotte Gay, who purchased all of Lot 14 in Section 11 (the town of Constantia) in 1831. Lot 14 was about a quarter of the land in the area that came to be known as Gayville. In 1854 they lost the land in a mortgage foreclosure, and they left the area, leaving their name in common usage. The road from Constantia was called the Gayville Road, and when the sixth school district was established in the town of Constantia it was called the Gayville District. The district operated until 1952, when the New York State Education Department consolidated small rural district schools into central districts, and Gayville became part of the Central Square Central Schools. The Gayville Post Office was established in 1880. Between 1900 and 1910 the Rural Free Delivery system was established, and the Gayville Post Office closed. Once more the residents of Gayville received their mail from the Post Office in Constantia Village.

At one time Gayville had a hotel with a ballroom and bar, several sawmills, and a Methodist Protestant congregation that met in the schoolhouse.

== Present community ==
Gayville today is a residential community. A number of original farmhouses and a few barns remain, but most of the homes are contemporary. No trace can be seen of the schoolhouse, hotel, or mills.
