= Gayville, Putnam County, New York =

Hamlet in the United States of America

Coordinates: 41°26′26″N 73°35′01″W

Gayville is a hamlet in Putnam County, in the U.S. state of New York.

Gayville was named for a family of early settlers.
