= Brewster Central School District =

School district in the U.S. state of New York

The Brewster Central School District is composed of four schools:

- Brewster High School
- Henry H. Wells Middle School
- C. V. Starr Intermediate School
- John F. Kennedy Elementary School

The village of Brewster is located within the town of Southeast, approximately 50 miles (80 km) north of New York City in Putnam County. The Town of Southeast surrounds the independent and separately governed 134-acre (0.54 km^{2}) Village of Brewster. Although the Town of Southeast is the larger municipality, the area is commonly referred to as "Brewster," the name recognized by the Post Office.

== Schools ==
=== Brewster High School (Grades 9-12) ===
Brewster High School is a comprehensive public secondary school for grades 9 to 12 with an enrollment of approximately 220 in each grade and over 110 teachers and support personnel.

=== Henry H. Wells Middle School (Grades 6-8) ===
The Henry H. Wells Middle School was the second school building built in the Brewster Central School District and it opened in 1957, at which time it was known as Brewster High School. At that time, it housed grades 6 to 12. During this period, Garden Street School served as the lone elementary building in the district for grades K to 5. Over time, as the district continued to grow, the 'new' Brewster High School could not keep up with the needs of the school community. In 1971, when Brewster High School was opened on Foggintown Road, the original high school was rededicated as the Henry H. Wells Middle School, a school designed to work with the unique characteristics of the middle school child, grades 6 to 8. As the Brewster community continued to grow and prosper, the Middle School was called upon to assist by taking the 5th graders into their midst to crowded. From September 1990 to January 1998, the Middle School served grades 5 to 8. With the opening of C.V. Starr in January 1998, the building went back to grades 6 to 8.

=== C. V. Starr Intermediate School (Grades 3-5) ===
The C. V. Starr Intermediate School was opened in January 1998. The building helped solve some of the overcrowding situations in the elementary schools and the middle school. When the doors were opened, 4th grade students from JFK Elementary and GSS Elementary, along with 5th grade students from the Wells Middle School began attending this school.

=== John F. Kennedy Elementary School (Grades K-2) ===
John F. Kennedy Elementary School was erected in 1964 with 21 classrooms in the original building. In 1968, ten "open" classrooms were added as the "roundhouse." There was also an expansion of the school cafeteria. During the summer of 2001, the "roundhouse" was renovated and each of the ten classrooms completely enclosed. Four portable classrooms were added in 1988 to accommodate the influx of children.

John F. Kennedy had served as a kindergarten through grade five facility until 1990 when the fifth grade was moved to Henry H. Wells Middle School to accommodate its again growing population. With the building of C.V. Starr Intermediate School in 1998, the fourth grade vacated and JFK now houses kindergarten through second grades.

== Former schools ==
=== Garden Street Elementary School ===
Originally built in the late 19th century, Garden Street School burned to the ground and was rebuilt in 1925. The school served as the sole educational facility in Brewster until the Henry H. Wells "High School" was built in 1957. Over the years, two additions were built.

In 1990, the fifth grade was moved to H.H. Wells Middle School to alleviate overcrowding at Garden Street School. In 1998, Garden Street lost its fourth grade students and staff, as they moved to C.V. Starr Intermediate School.

Garden Street Elementary School closed in June 2012.

In 2019, under the Village of Brewster's 'Urban Renewal Plan', the old school was to be transformed into a 'Arts and Cultural Center' to host artists working studios and galleries. However this plan did not come to fruition. The building was sold to a Manhattan developer for $1,475,000 in 2020. There was a small fire at the building in 2022 and it was once again for sale in 2023. In 2024, the mayor of the village of Brewster described the building as a "blight".

== District office ==
- Michelle Gosh, Superintendent of Schools
- Victor Karlsson, Assistant Superintendent for Business

== Board of education ==
The Board of Education usually meets two Tuesdays each month. The seven members of the Board are elected by the qualified voters of the district to serve without remuneration for three-year terms.
