= Briarcliff Manor Public Library =

Public library serving Briarcliff Manor, New York

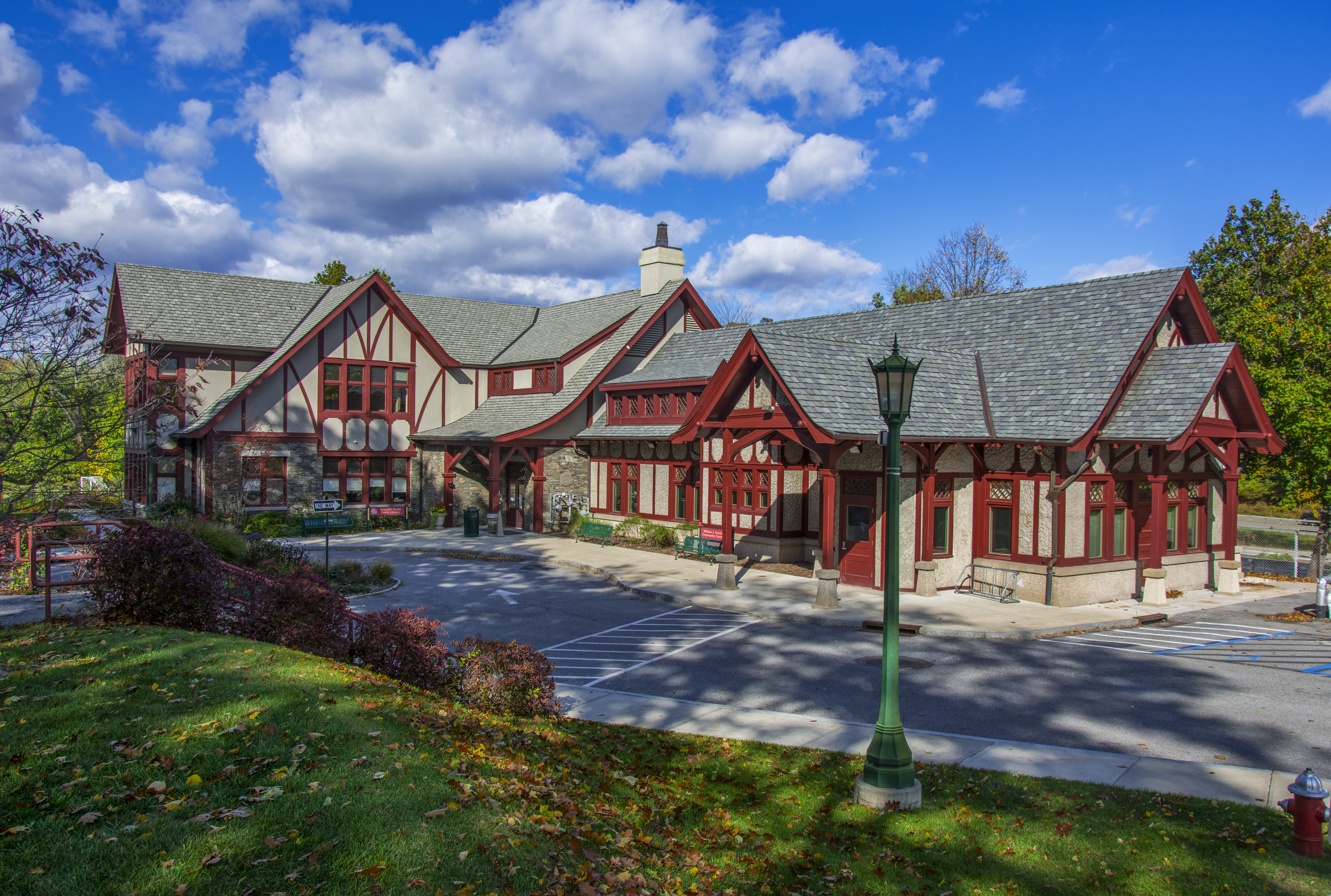
- Library and community center from Library Road (2016)
- Location in Briarcliff Manor
- 41°08′48″N 73°49′28″W
- Location: Briarcliff Manor, New York, U.S.
- Type: Municipal public library
- Established: 1914 (112 years ago); 1921 (105 years ago) (as the Briarcliff Free Library)

Collection
- Size: 40,000

Access and use
- Circulation: 110,336
- Population served: 7,867

Other information
- Budget: $661,609
- Director: Kim Naples
- Employees: 11 (5.21 FTE)
- Website: briarcliffmanorlibrary.org

The Briarcliff Manor Public Library is the public library serving the village of Briarcliff Manor, New York, United States, and is located on the edge of the Walter W. Law Memorial Park.

The library is a founding member of the Westchester Library System. It is staffed by a director and eleven employees, including reference and youth librarians, and is governed by a ten-member board, with a liaison to the village board of trustees. The library offers computer classes, book discussion groups, young adult programs, a children's room and a local history collection. The library building also houses the Briarcliff Manor-Scarborough Historical Society, the Briarcliff Manor Recreation Department, and the William J. Vescio Community Center.

The library was founded in 1914 in the Briarcliff Community Center. Around 1921, the library was established as the Briarcliff Free Library, an association library within the New York State library system. From the building's destruction in 1929 and over the next thirty years, the library was without a permanent location, and was moved between sites, including public school buildings and the village recreation center.

In 1959, the library purchased the former Briarcliff Manor station of the New York and Putnam Railroad, which had been ordered and funded by Briarcliff Manor founder Walter Law in 1906. In 1964, the association library became a public library and adopted its current name.

In 1981, the trackbed which ran alongside the building became part of a 48-mile-long (77-kilometre) rail trail, consisting of the South County, North County, and Putnam County Trailways. The biking, running, and walking trail stretches from the Bronx north to Brewster.

After library renovations in the 1980s and 1990s, a significant expansion was completed in 2009, adding the section in which the library is housed today. In 2016, the village's community center opened in the original portion of the building.

== History ==
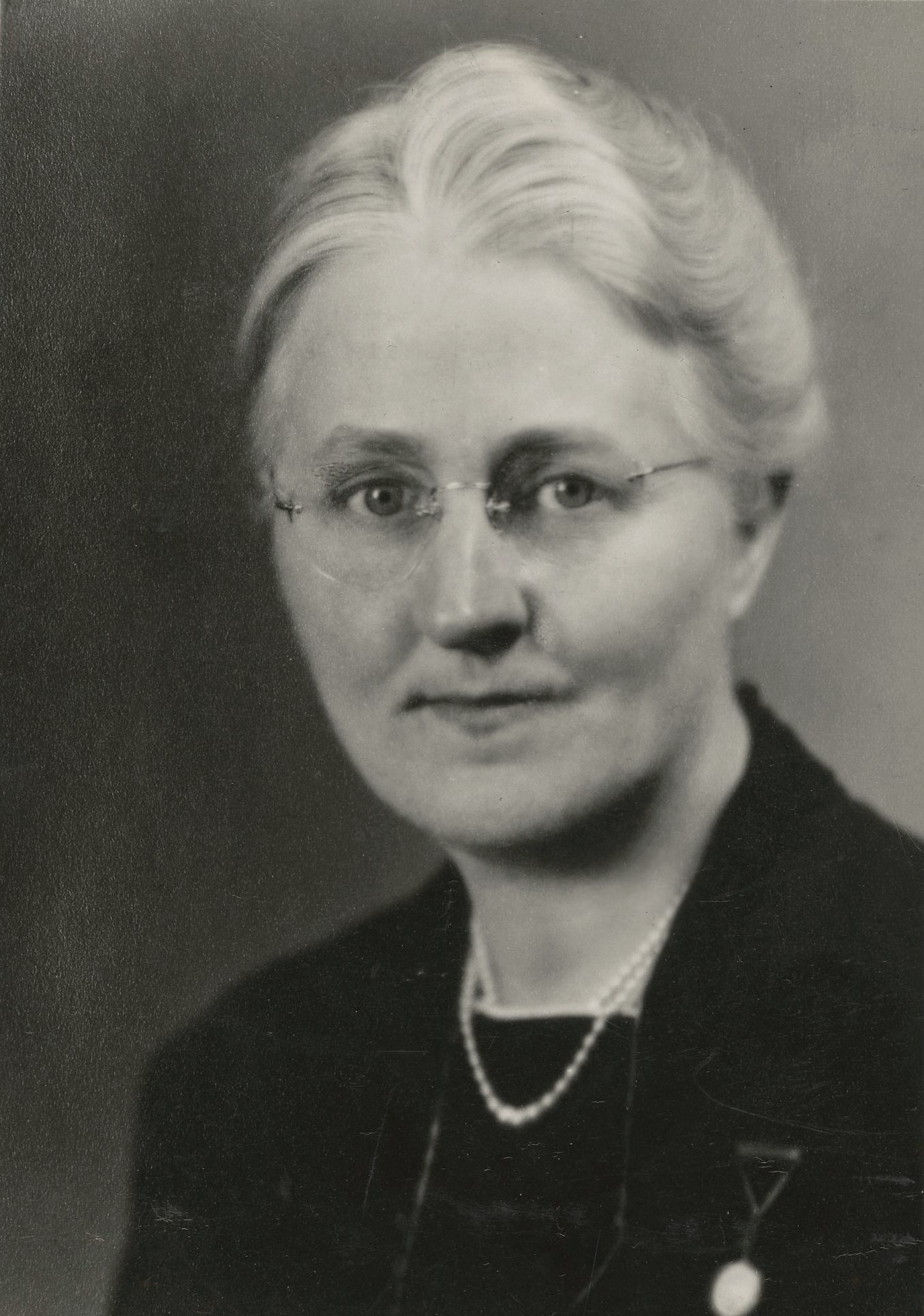
Amy Bookwalter

Librarians (1921–1955) Directors (1955–present) (Note: From 1921 to 1955 there was only one paid librarian among a volunteer staff.)
Name	Tenure	Notes	References
Louise Miller	1921–1926	Acting while studying library service at Columbia University	
Elizabeth Kelly	1926–1927	Part-time art teacher at Briarcliff High School	
Grace Baird Hersey	1928–1956	Mother of Pulitzer Prize-winning writer John Hersey	
Mrs. William Osborne	1956–1963		
Marjorie Tully Widenhorn	1963		
Helen Barolini	1964–1965	Wife of poet and author Antonio Barolini	
Sally R. Dow	1965	Interim director	
Bettie Diver	1965–1968		
Charles Farkas	1968–1996	Father of government official and journalist Evelyn Farkas	
Geraldine S. Mahoney (née Baldwin)	1997–2010	Founding director of the Desmond-Fish Library, Garrison	
Melinda Greenblatt	2011–2016		
Shelley Glick	2016–2017	Interim in 2011; also serving as the reference librarian	
Donna Pesce	2017–present		

A public library was founded by Edward S. Arnold in 1914 within the Briarcliff Community Center (also referred to as "the Club"). The Community Center's building had been built as a Briarcliff Manor public school in 1898. In the library's early years, it did not have a librarian or regular library hours. The library was significantly affected by World War I, as all volunteer efforts were refocused to aid the country's war effort.

By 1921, the library was described as "practically moribund" though progress resumed in 1921 largely due to the efforts of Amy Bookwalter, who in that year became the first president of the library. Bookwalter was credited with reopening the library and officially establishing it as the Briarcliff Free Library on March 8, 1921. She was largely unassisted in these efforts.

On September 1, 1922, the club's library funds were transferred to the Library Committee of the Briarcliff Free Library. The library was registered with the New York state library system on September 22 of that year and an eight-member board of trustees was appointed. A paid part-time librarian alongside volunteers operated the circulation desk and created the library's card catalog. (Until 1955, there was only one paid librarian among a staff of volunteers.)

In 1925, the village government donated US$500 ($9,600 today) to the library and established an annual appropriation for it. At that time, it had 1,900 volumes, which became 3,000 by 1926, 6,000 by 1939, and 8,000 by 1952. By 1988, the library's collections had grown to 25,000; its current collections contain 40,000 volumes.

Interactive map highlighting historical and current locations

In its early years, the library received book donations from the village Sunday school and the club. In July 1928, the library moved from the Community Center building (Note: The Community Center building had been sold to the Westchester Parkway Commission and was to be demolished to create a ramp to the new Briarcliff–Peekskill Parkway, however the building burned down shortly after its sale, in 1929.) to the tower room of the former Briarcliff Farms office building, currently a branch of the International Union of Operating Engineers. The Community Center building was sold in October 1929 for $16,000; these funds were required to be used for recreational purposes. Thus, the organization gave $11,000 to the village for the construction of the Law Memorial Park pool, and $5,000 to the library. Upon the building's sale and the club's dissolution, the library was reconstituted as an association library with a 15-member board of trustees.

The librarians sought a larger and more centrally located space than the Briarcliff Farms building. On March 18, 1930, after invitation from the Briarcliff school district's Board of Education, the library was relocated again. It moved to a large room on the main floor of Briarcliff High School's extension to its Law Park school building. In August 1949, the school required more classroom space, so the Board of Education asked the library to relocate. The village board then provided the library with two rooms on the second floor of its recreation building near the village downtown on Old Route 100 (then part of NY Route 100). From the beginning, the recreation center rooms were too small to hold the library's collection (only holding about 7,000 of its 8,500 books), had insufficient room for tables and chairs, and no space for exhibits or displays. As well, the area was busy with traffic, due to its location at the intersection of two highways. It was also far from the village's public school buildings and had no sidewalks nearby, making it poorly accessible and hazardous for children to visit.

One referendum proposal was to build a $50,000 library on the site of a proposed addition to Todd Elementary School. Prior to the referendum, at a school district meeting, concern was raised over the proposed location, given that it would legally be only temporary and was not centrally located in the village. The proposed building would be 1,400 square feet (130 m^{2}) as opposed to their present 750 square feet (70 m^{2}). On March 18, 1952, the New York State Board of Regents granted the library a provisional charter.

=== Current location ===
On January 19, 1959, the library moved to its fifth location and first permanent home, the former Briarcliff Manor station originally on the New York City & Northern Railroad (later the New York and Putnam Railroad). The station had been built in 1906 by village founder Walter W. Law in the Tudor Revival style, as a replacement for a smaller station, which was moved to nearby Millwood. In its later operation as a station, the building was rarely used, and only four trains stopped there each day. Due to the railroad's tracks ending in the Bronx and requiring a transfer to continue on to Manhattan, many Briarcliff Manor residents would drive to Pleasantville or Scarborough, which had stations along lines ending in Manhattan, and more trains ran along those lines. The passenger railroad, then known as the Putnam Division of the New York Central Railroad, discontinued service in 1958, freeing up use of the building for the library.

With closer proximity to schools, more parking, and double the availability of shelf space, the village purchased the former station for $12,500 ($138,100 today) and leased the building and its acre of land to the library. The library required $20,500 ($226,400 today) for purchasing and renovating the building; it raised $14,000 ($154,600 today) from village residents, with the remainder funded by the village board. On April 19, 1959, the refurbished building was dedicated and the village board named the street that led to the library Library Road. With its own space, the library increased its collection, hired more staff, and doubled its operating hours. Also in 1959, the library received its absolute charter, and transferred the charter in 1964 from a free library association to a fully tax-supported public library and thus changed its name from the Briarcliff Free Library to the Briarcliff Manor Public Library.

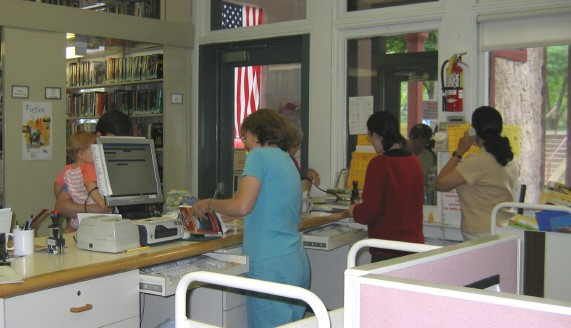
Circulation desk in the former station

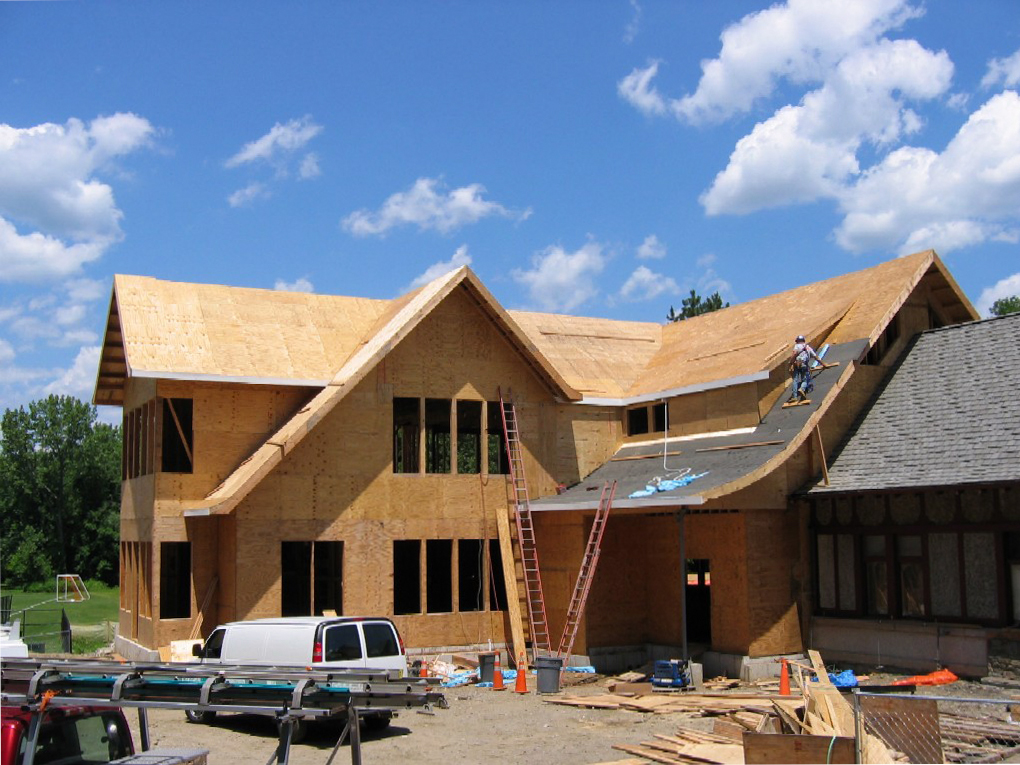
Constructing the library extension, June 2008

In 1963, Briarcliff resident and artist Myril Adler proposed a series of exhibits of graphic art; the first showing was in October of that year and recurred each month thereafter, each with Sunday opening receptions. Exhibitors included Adler, Michael Ponce de Leon, Seong Moy, Rodolfo Abularach, Fritz Eichenberg, Jacob Landau, George Earl Ortman, Minna Citron, and Alfredo Da Silva. Exhibited works included etchings and engravings, woodcuts, cellocuts, lithographs, collage intaglios, and serigraphs. As a result of these exhibits, the library began a collection of prints donated by the exhibiting artists. In the library's small space, Adler displayed prints between shelves and in the youth and children's reading rooms.

The library, which was 3,200 square feet (300 m^{2}), was too small for readers and events; other significant problems included no wireless capacity and poor shelving and lighting. In 1980, a large interior renovation took place; former mayor Chester L. Fisher and his wife led a fundraising effort, raising $50,072 ($195,700 today). Construction started in March 1980 and included interior painting, new shelves, cabinets, and carpeting for the main room, a mezzanine on the south side, a relocated checkout desk and remodeled children's room, and a vestibule in the main entrance designed to match the original building.

In 1981, the first section of the Putnam Division trackbed was repurposed as a trailway; the section ran from the library south to New York Route 117. The current 48-mile biking, running, and walking trail was completed in 2014, and consists of the South County, North County, and Putnam County Trailways. It stretches from Van Cortlandt Park in the Bronx north to Brewster. In 1985, the library and the Briarcliff Lodge were among 60 sites given historical markers by Westchester County Tricentennial Commission. In 1995, village residents held a referendum for a new $1.8 million library of 10,600 square feet (980 m^{2}) to be built behind the village municipal building; it failed by 13 votes, from the 871 cast. A 1996 proposal for a smaller building, costing $1.7 million, was rejected by 199 votes. From 1997 to 1999, major renovations took place on the building's interior and exterior.

In the early 2000s, plans began for expansion of the library building. A modular building was set up in 2004 as a temporary children's room. In November 2006, a $4 million bond resolution ($6.39 million today) for the addition passed by 228 votes, from the 2,632 cast. Construction of the two-story 6,600-square-foot (610-square-metre) addition began in summer 2007 and was completed on February 19, 2009. The Club at Briarcliff Manor pledged 2.25 million for the renovation and sponsored its opening celebration on March 8, 2009. The original station building was renovated to become a village community center in 2016. The plans were in development since as early as 2013 and the finished project held a cost of $1.8 million. On May 30, 2016, Mayor Lori Sullivan and former mayor William J. Vescio presided over the center's opening and dedication to Vescio. (Note: Vescio, a village resident since about 1973, had served on the village board for 29 years, including eleven as trustee and ten as mayor. Vescio oversaw construction of the library and community center, and of a new water supply system for the village.)

== Location and architecture ==
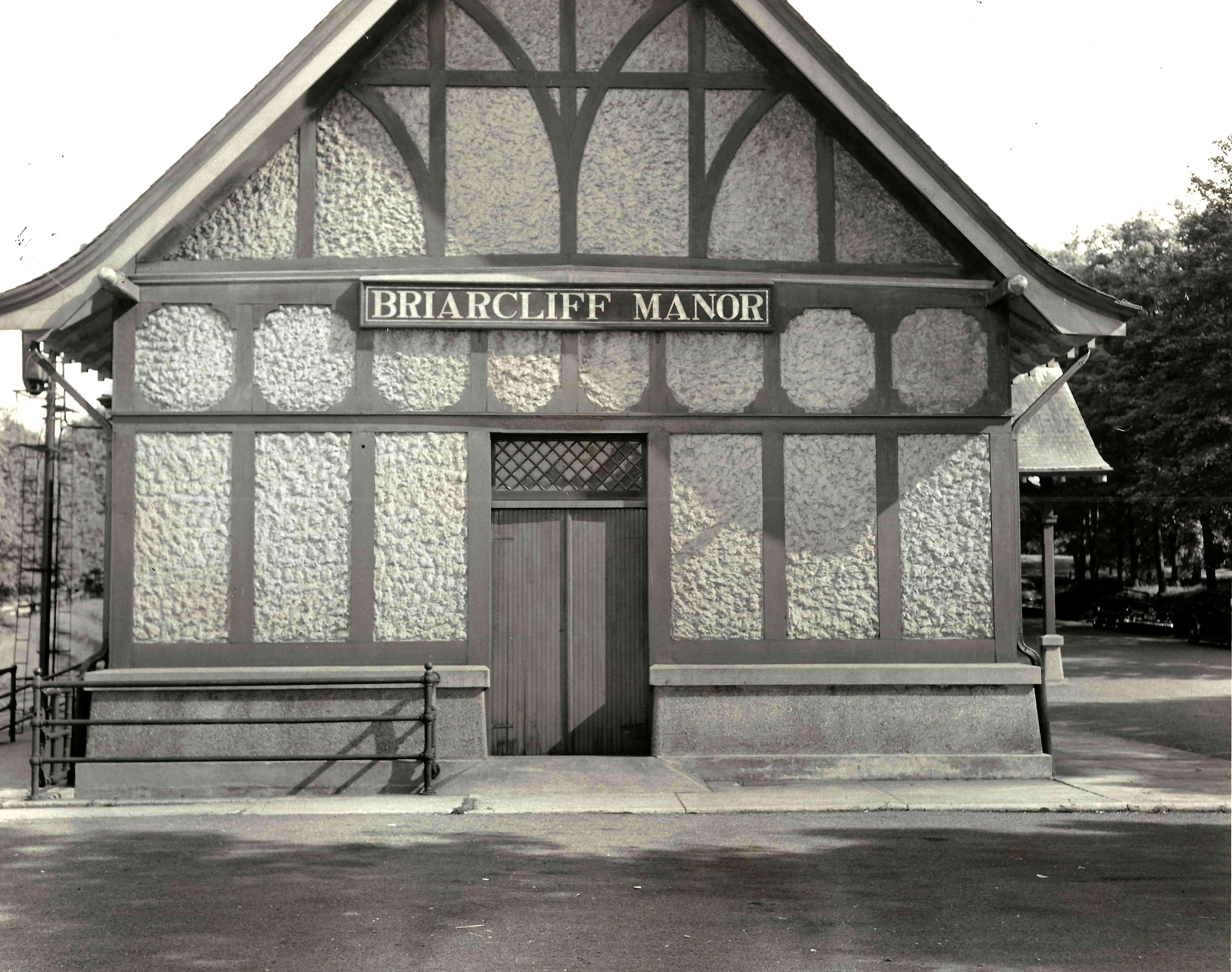
The half-timber and stucco train station, 1952. This facade was demolished in 2008.

The Briarcliff Manor Public Library is located on the eastern edge of the Walter W. Law Memorial Park on Library Road, and has a large parking lot accessible from Library Road. The site is near the library's first and third locations and borders the pool that was constructed using funds from the sale of the Community Center. The current structure consists of the 1.5-story former train station on the south end and the two-story extension on the north side.

=== Station building ===
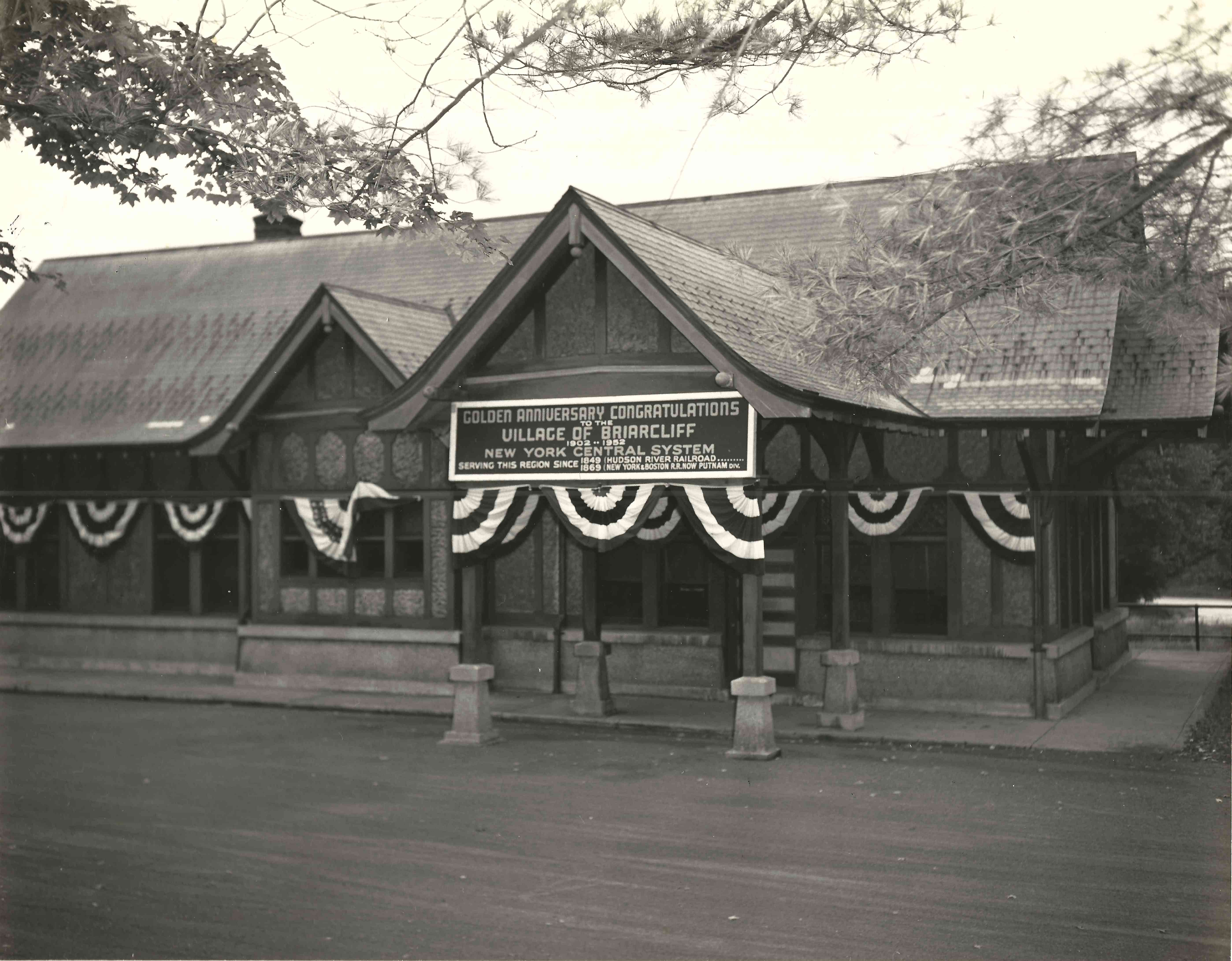
Briarcliff Manor station, 1952

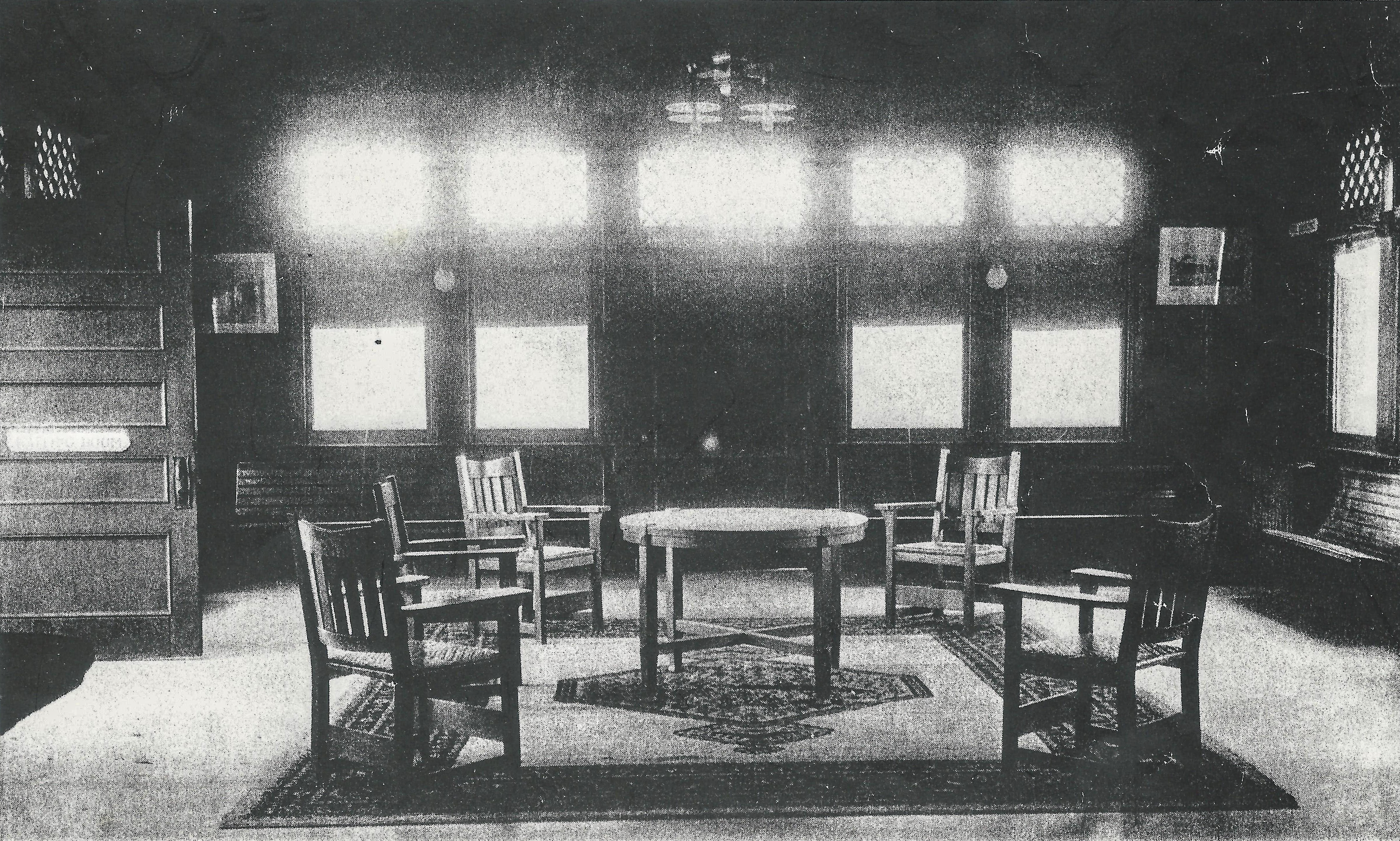
The 1906 station's original decor

The original building's exterior was designed in an English Tudor Revival style, which The New York Times observed as "pseudo-medieval". It features multiple gables, arcs of red-painted wood, and a gently-sloping portico. When active as a train station, the timbering was painted a shade of green used for other New York Central stations. When the library moved in, it spent $1,000 to repaint and clean the outside timbers and stucco.

The original building's interior initially had dark wood panels and was decorated with flowers, oriental rugs on the terrazzo floor, and tables and chairs in the Mission style. In 1959, when the library moved in, local architect and village resident William Anders Sharman planned the building's $2,000 renovation; he later became the first president of the Briarcliff Manor-Scarborough Historical Society. The station's circular ticket office was replaced by the librarian's desk, bookshelves replaced station furniture, and the baggage room became the children's section. Former library president Theodore R. Malsin dedicated the children's room in memory of his son Donald. From 1959 until 2009, the building housed a main reading room and children's room; a vestibule and second-story balcony were added in 1980.

The community center, opening in 2016 in the same space, was designed by architectural firm Peter F. Gaito & Associates. It holds a meeting room and kitchen on the first floor and an oculus opening on the full-length second floor, which is intended for presentations, exhibits, reading, studying, and computer usage. The community center also has a backup generator for use as an emergency broadcast and a warming and cooling center. It can hold 80 people on its first floor and 110 on its second, and has movable furniture and a large television on each floor to accommodate a variety of programming.

=== Extension ===
The building's extension has the same half-timber and stucco exterior as the original structure, also complementing the Law Park pavilion to form one complex. The extension houses an elevator between the basement and two above-ground floors. The first floor has a circulation desk of cherry- and caramel-stained wood with a granite countertop. It was sold to the library by craftsman and village resident Leonard Rerek at a significant discount. The first floor also includes a teen center with computers and a breakout room, as well as a children's room with its own breakout room. The second floor holds the adult fiction, non-fiction, and reference collections, as well as four computers, library offices, and a partitionable program room seating up to 80 people. The extension's interior was designed by architect, village resident, and library board member Catherine Bukard. The exterior was designed by Lothrop Associates.

Robert Wilson Crandall, namesake of the Crandall Room and president of the library board in the 1960s, helped endow the library's capital campaign. The children's room was named in memory of Juliette Wasserman, and was endowed by the Juliette Wasserman Children's Foundation.

== Operations ==
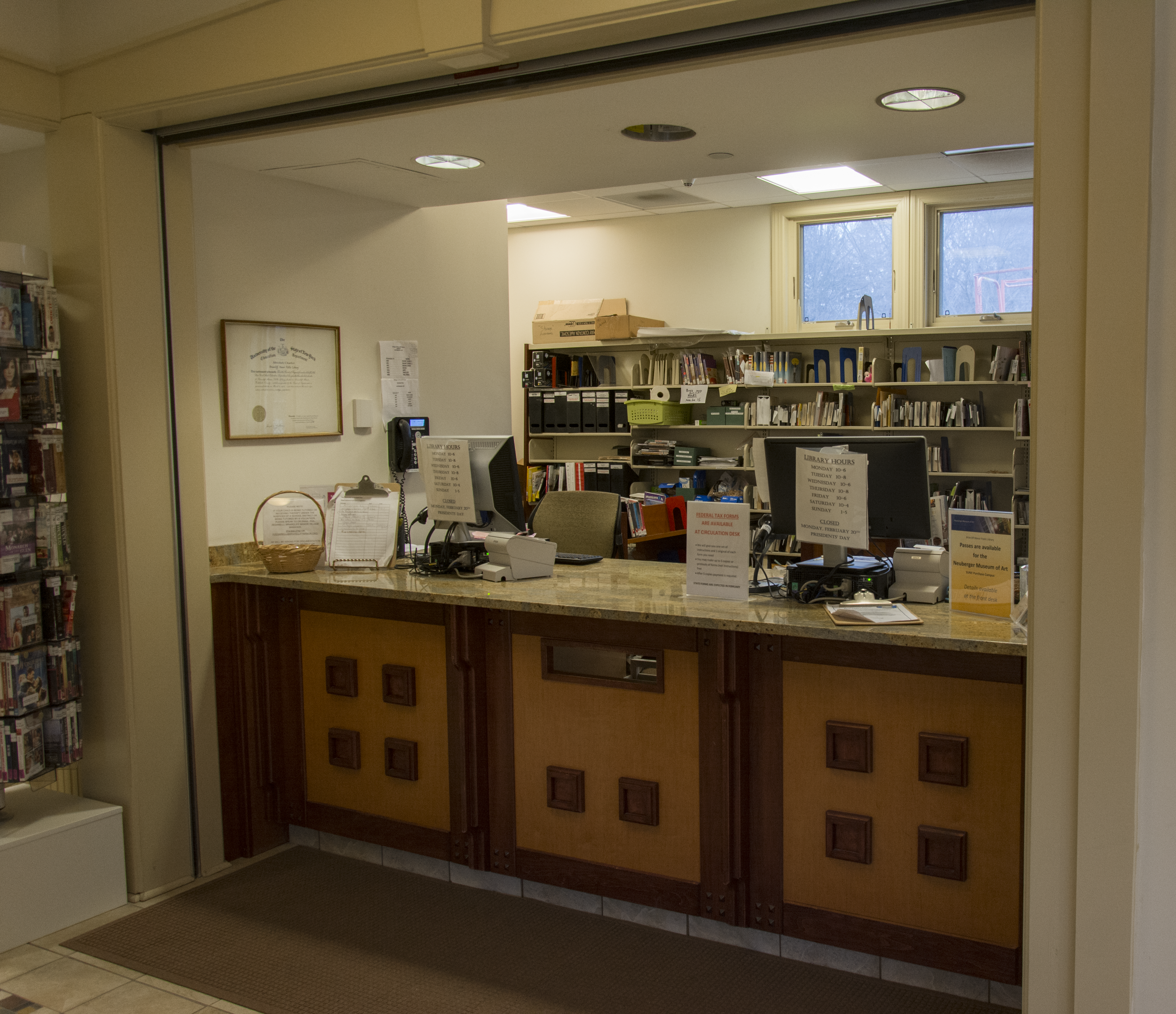
Circulation desk and program room in the library extension

The library is chartered as a Municipal Public Library, serving residents of the village of Briarcliff Manor. The western portion of the village, in the Ossining Union Free School District, is also served by the Ossining Public Library. The Ossining library, as a School District Public Library, includes the entire school district as its service area.

The Briarcliff library is open seven days per week, except in August when it is closed each Sunday. The library hosts four computer workstations and eight laptops, and has its own WiFi network. There are eleven staff members, including reference and youth librarians. The library employs an equivalent of 5.21 full-time employees, as most staff work part-time. The library is governed by a ten-member board, with a liaison to the village board. Services include computer classes, book discussion groups, young adult programs, a children's room, and a local history collection. Library spending constitutes about four percent of the village budget. Community members support the library through the Friends of the Briarcliff Manor Public Library organization. The organization's volunteers have helped shelve, repair, and check out books, provided art shows, sponsored adult discussion groups, and participated in all of the library's fundraising campaigns.

The Briarcliff Manor Public Library is a member of the Westchester Library System, the 38-member library system for Westchester County. Around 1940, the library was integrated with the Union Catalog of the Westchester Library Association, and it became one of the founding 31 members of the Westchester Library System in 1958.

== Organizations ==
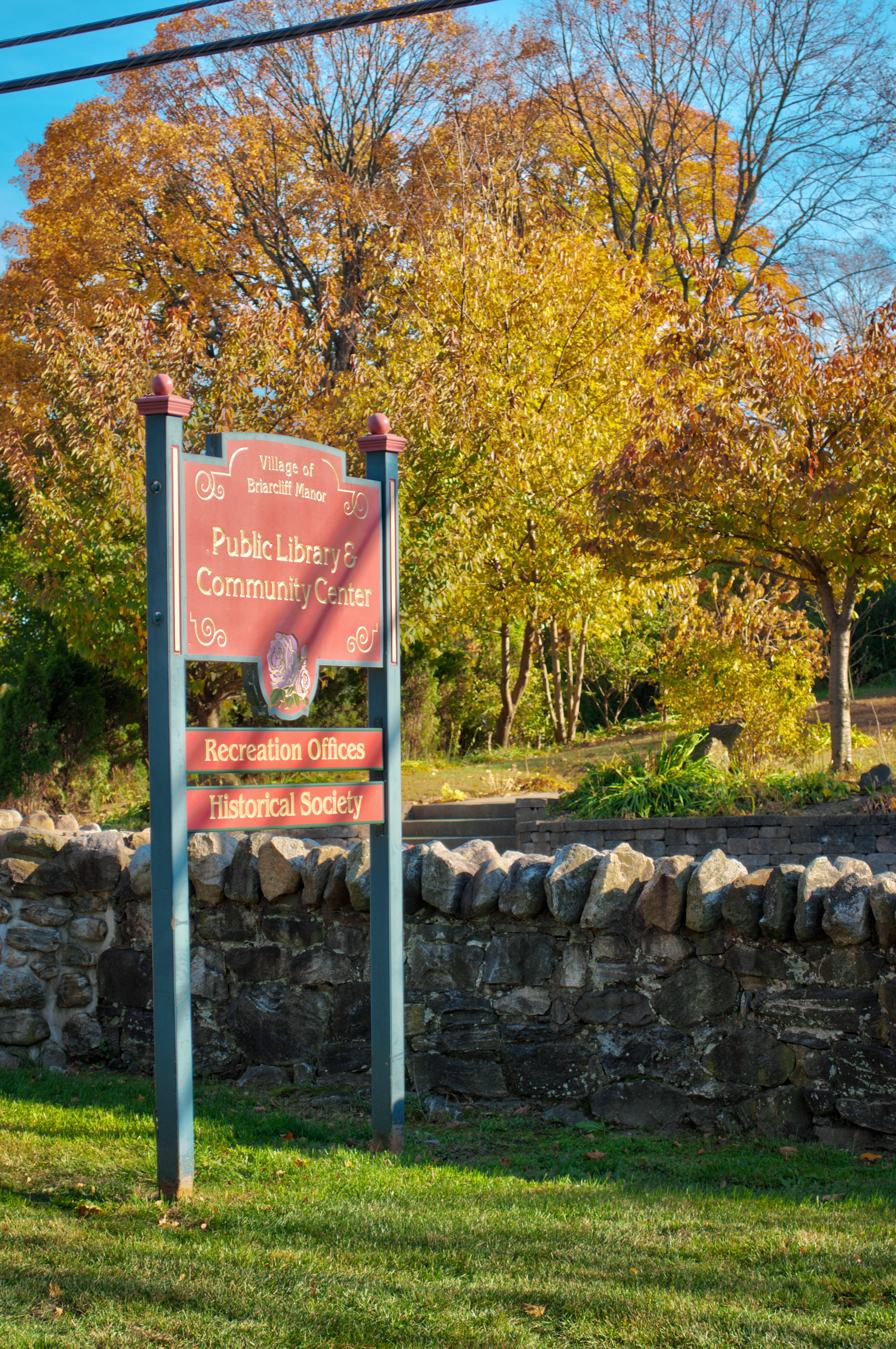
The library houses the Briarcliff Manor-Scarborough Historical Society and the Briarcliff Manor Recreation Department

=== Briarcliff Manor-Scarborough Historical Society ===
The Briarcliff Manor-Scarborough Historical Society (BMSHS) is a 501(c)(3) not-for-profit organization committed to local preservation, research, and education. In March 1974, after the village mayor appointed twelve people for a 75th anniversary committee, the committee began by forming the Briarcliff Manor-Scarborough Historical Society, which received its provisional charter around that time. The historical society published an updated village history (A Village Between Two Rivers: Briarcliff Manor) in 1977, marking the 75th anniversary of the village. The organization has since published several books, including a comprehensive history of the village. The publication, The Changing Landscape, a History of Briarcliff Manor-Scarborough, was written by Mary Cheever, wife of novelist John Cheever. In 2016, the society and village government created and dedicated a memorial to Medal of Honor recipient John Koelsch at Law Memorial Park.

The historical society was initially located at the Law Park school building; it later moved to the second floor of a realty building on Pleasantville Road, and then moved back to the school building after the building was leased by Pace University, occupying that space for eight years. In September 1982, the society moved to the Weber-Tufts building at 1123 Pleasantville Road. On March 21, 2010, the BMSHS was given a permanent location at the Eileen O'Connor Weber Historical Center in the library building, established as part of the library's expansion. The current president, Karen Smith, heads a board of trustees, members of which have three-year terms with a required one-year recess between terms.

Members of the historical society joined the nine-member Centennial Committee in 2002 to organize events for Briarcliff Manor's centennial. The Centennial Committee and BMSHS helped organize several events for the village's 2002 centennial celebration, including the Briarcliff Centennial Variety Show held at the Briarcliff High School auditorium in a sold-out two-night run on April 26–27, 2002. The two-act show consisted of interpretations of village life by village organizations and a revue of Briarcliff Manor history in skits and songs. Other society-sponsored events have included tours of homes and churches, bus tours, Hudson River cruises on historic boats such as the M/V Commander (built in 1917 and listed on the national and state registers of historic places), dances, antique-car exhibits, day trips to historic points of interest, film and art exhibits and events with authors and elected officials.

=== Briarcliff Manor Recreation Department ===
The library houses the village's recreation department, which has four employees and a six-member advisory committee, and provides recreation programming for the village. This includes regular programs and special events at the pool, parks, and sports fields and courts. It issues about 1,400 pool permits annually and manages about 400 summer camp registrations each year. The department has operated the recreation center on Macy Road since 1980, and also runs a youth center on Van Lu Van Road. Its 2017–18 operating budget is $1,432,116.

The department had its origins in a recreation committee formed in 1943. The first recreation center opened that year at the village's public works building. In 1952, among the programs held were movies, music, square dances, arts and crafts, and lessons in swimming, tennis, golf, and archery.

== See also ==
- History of Briarcliff Manor

== Notes ==
Preceding station	New York Central Railroad	Following station
Former services
Millwood toward Brewster	Putnam Division	Graham toward Sedgwick Avenue
