= Briarcliff Lodge =

Luxury resort in the village of Briarcliff Manor, New York

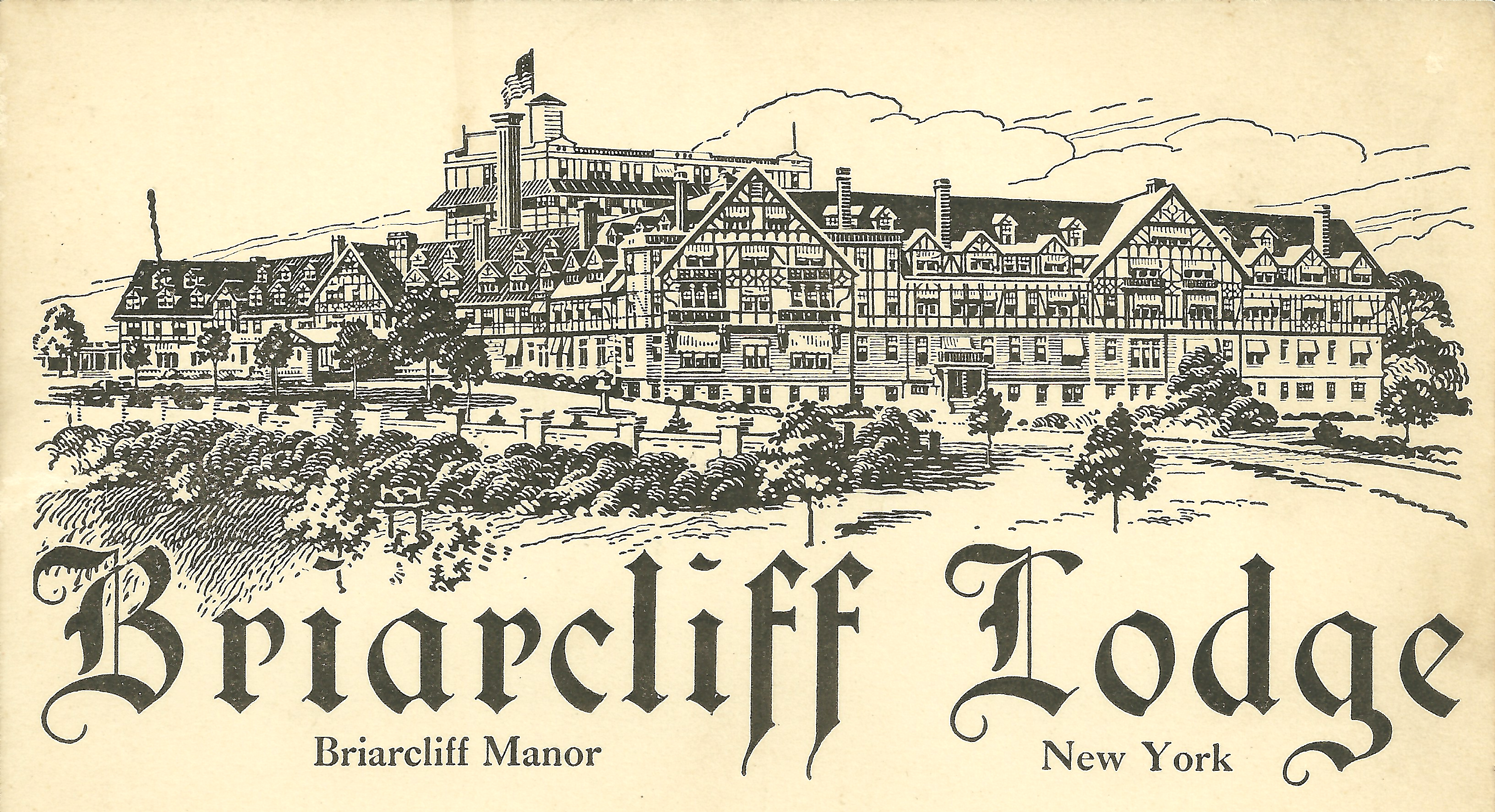
- Early 1900s postcard of the Briarcliff Lodge

General information
- Status: Demolished
- Type: Resort
- Architectural style: Tudor Revival
- Location: 25 Scarborough Road, Briarcliff Manor, New York, United States
- Opened: June 26, 1902 (124 years ago)
- Destroyed: January 16, 2004 (22 years ago)
- Owner: Walter Law and family (1902–37); Edgewood Park School (1937–54); The King's College (1955–94)

Technical details
- Floor count: 4 (original and north wing); 7 (west wing)

Design and construction
- Architects: Guy King (1902); John Clark Udall (1907–09)
- Interactive map pinpointing the site of the hotel
- 41.148111°N 73.839722°W

The Briarcliff Lodge was a luxury resort in the village of Briarcliff Manor, New York, United States. It was a notable example of Tudor Revival architecture, and was one of the largest wooden structures in the United States. It was also the first hotel in Westchester County.

Walter William Law had it built on his estate, and the Law family owned it until 1937. When the lodge opened in 1902, it was one of the largest resort hotels in the world. The lodge hosted presidents, royalty, and celebrities, and was the scene of numerous memorable occasions for visitors and local residents who attended weddings, receptions, and dances in the ballroom and dining room. For a long time, the lodge was situated among other businesses of Walter Law, including the Briarcliff Farms and Briarcliff Table Water Company.

In 1933, the lodge ended year-round service and housed a "health-diet sanitarium" until the Edgewood Park School for Girls began operation there from 1937 to 1954. From 1936 to 1939, the lodge was run again as a hotel in the summer months while the school was closed. From 1955 to 1994, The King's College used the lodge building and built dormitories and academic buildings.

Abandoned and unmaintained after 1994, the Briarcliff Lodge was destroyed between 2003 and 2004.

== History ==
=== Hotel ===
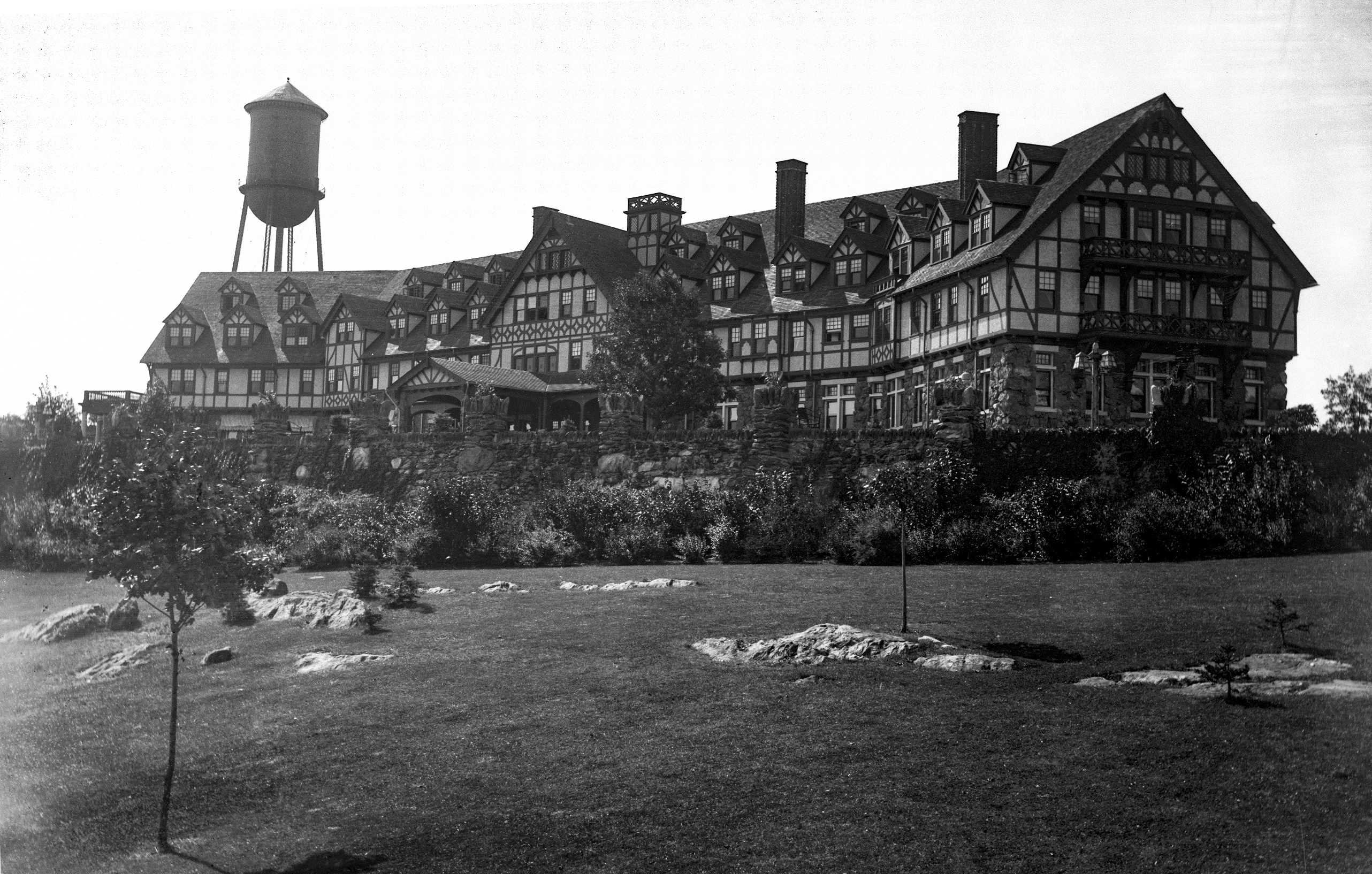
The lodge before its 1907 and 1909 additions

Walter Law hired Pennsylvania architect Guy King to construct the Briarcliff Lodge on the highest point of Law's estate. At its June 26, 1902 opening, the Tudor Revival-style building was a premier resort hotel with 93 rooms. The Olmsted Brothers, sons of the eminent landscape designer Frederick Law Olmsted, designed the lodge's surrounding grounds, including a large hillside landscape garden with shady walks, winding drives, green lawns, and flowers. In 1903, the lodge additionally began being used by Mary Elizabeth Dow as Mrs. Dow's School. Walter Law gave Dow a 35-acre (14 ha) property on Elm Road (later the site of Briarcliff College and then a Pace University campus).

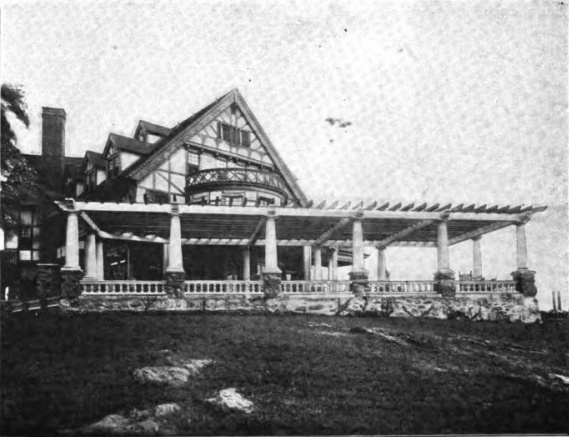
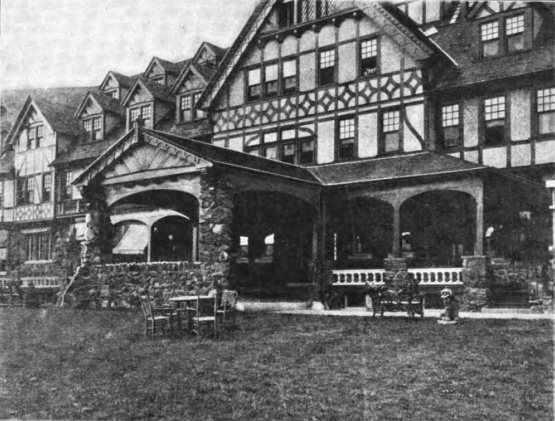
Exteriors ca. 1907: south-facing pergola; porch and porte-cochère

At The Briarcliff Lodge
From Carmino Ravosa's Briarcliff show

In 1907, John Clark Udall oversaw construction of a north wing, increasing the number of rooms to 150. In 1909, Udall oversaw a 72-room seven-story west wing, further increasing the rooms to 221. In Germany, it was advertised in January 1909 that the management of the Briarcliff Lodge and its architect Guy King planned to construct the platform to launch and dock airships, to cost $100,000. The platform would extend over the whole roof, and the tracks for the airship launch would be on an incline 105 meters long. The plans also included the purchase of a searchlight to guide the airships. A mooring mast for docking airships was constructed on top of the west wing, however no record exists of it having been used. The mooring mast nonetheless was the first built for docking airships.

There were two sets of greenhouses near the property; one set behind Law's home produced decorations for Law's Briarcliff Farms, his house, the lodge, and workers' houses. The other set, the Pierson Greenhouses, were used for growing the American Beauty rose and rare carnations, producing between 5,000 and 8,000 per week. Foreman George Romaine first propagated the Briarcliff rose there. The lodge also ran an annual American Beauty carnival, with events including a golf tournament, water sports, moonlight bathing and night diving, a dinner dance, cinema program, and a concert. During the lodge's service, carriage transportation was provided for guests from the Scarborough and Briarcliff Manor train stations to the lodge.

The lodge had a large Roman-style pool; when it was built in 1912, it was the largest outdoor pool in the world and was used for the 1924 Olympic trials. The Briarcliff Lodge was noted for its cuisine (including Briarcliff dairy and table water), a golf course, fifteen tennis courts, a music room, theater, indoor swimming pool (measuring 30 by 70 feet, with a depth of 4 to 10 feet), casino, library, stable, repair shops and a fleet of Fiat automobiles. The water tower at the property was constructed by the Chicago Bridge & Iron Company. The grounds were decorated with Japanese lanterns that Law had obtained from missionaries. The lodge had elevator service and electric lighting. The Carnegie Endowment for International Peace held its National Conference on International Problems and Relations at the Briarcliff Lodge from May 10–14, 1926.

In 1923, a year before Walter Law's death, the Law family leased the lodge to Chauncey Depew Steele for 20 years. Under Steele's management, the lodge reached its prominence. The lodge also was opened to a wider variety of clientele, but continued to be known as a resort for the wealthy and famous. A 6,500-yard (5,900 m) 18-hole golf course was completed in 1923, designed by Devereux Emmet. In May 1925, The New York Times reported that the Briarcliff Lodge installed the first artificial spa; using radioactive mineral torbernite to affect the water, believed to counter ailments associated with old age. United States Senators Chauncey Depew, James Wolcott Wadsworth, Jr., and Royal S. Copeland were to each place a bag containing the minerals into the lodge's swimming pool. In June of that year, the newspaper mentioned in its report of an upcoming Briarcliff Lodge performance that the swimming pool was popular in the summer heat and that "the cool spring radioactive water gave considerable relief to several hundred guests".

=== Decline and lease ===
The hotel declined during the 1930s. Walter Law's son Henry (also village mayor from 1918 to 1938) attributed the decline to the 1920–1933 prohibition of alcohol. Another factor was the increasing usage of automobiles, as guests would be less inclined to stay throughout the summer. Steele ended up surrendering his lease in 1933; at the time, the building was valued at $750,000 ($18.7 million in 2025).

The lodge remained in use, housing a "health-diet sanitarium" until the Edgewood Park School for Girls, a nonsectarian Christian college- and occupational-preparatory school, leased the property in 1936, and purchased it a year later; at the time, the lodge was valued at $1,000,000 ($22.4 million in 2025). The lodge was run as a hotel in the summer months while the school was closed until 1939. The Edgewood Park School operated there until 1954.

In September 1955, The New York Times reported that the lodge was being reopened as a 225-room resort; after being purchased by a partnership led by Emanuel Shapiro, counsel for then-New York Governor Thomas E. Dewey. It was assessed at $400,000 ($4.81 million in 2025) at the time.

=== College use, demolition, and present-day site ===
Briarcliff Manor and Pleasantville Fire Departments fighting the lodge fire

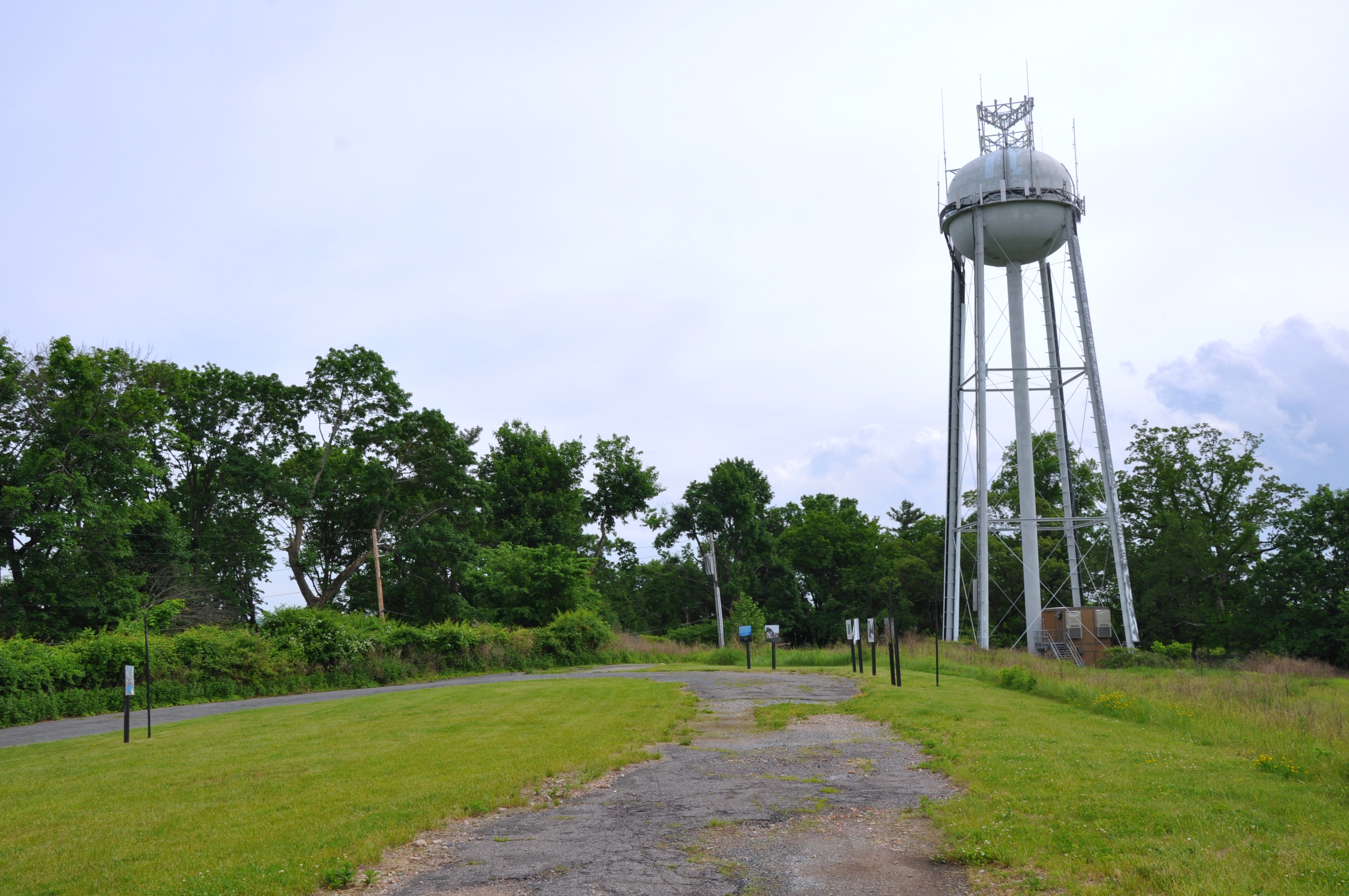
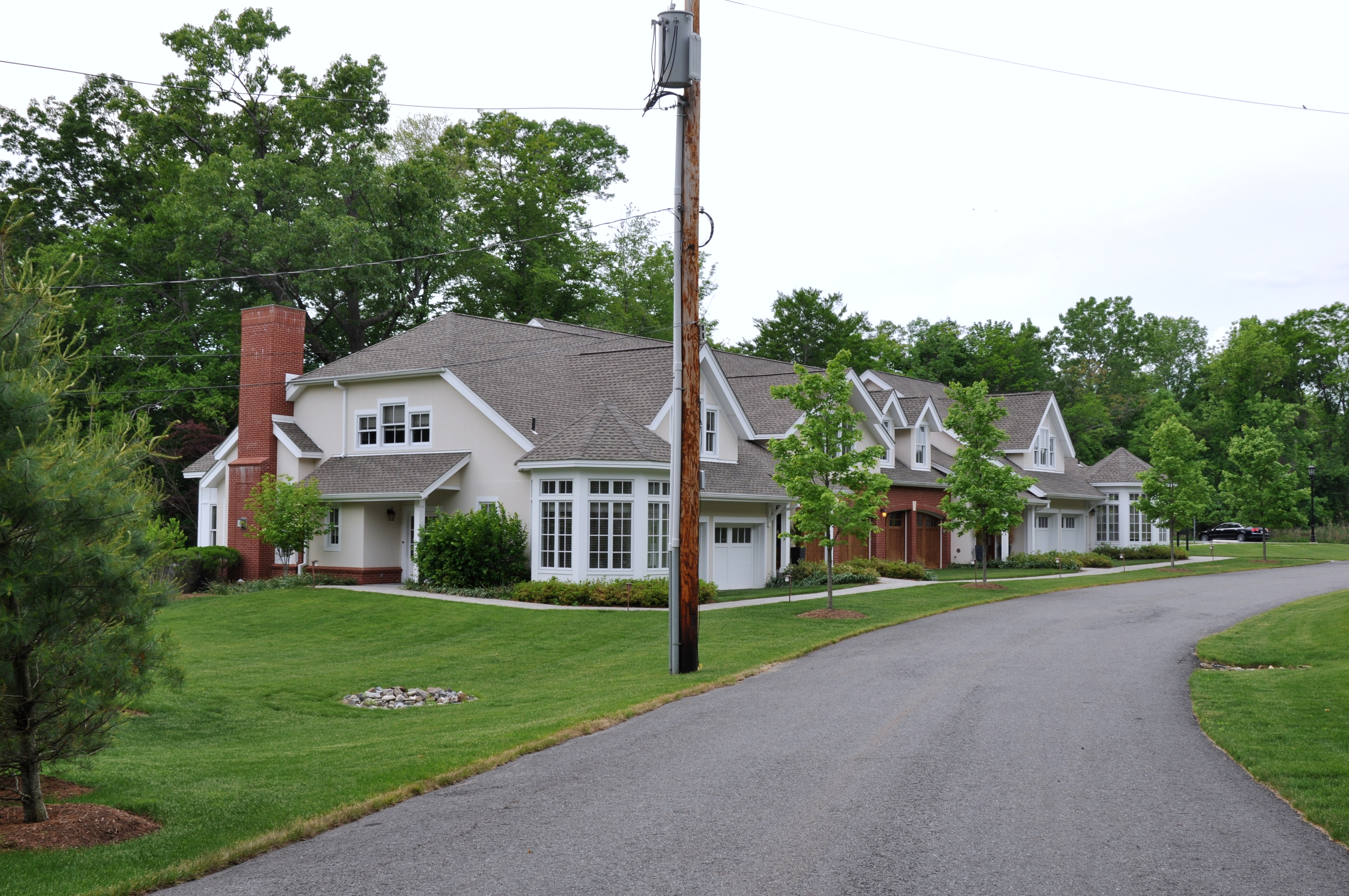
The Briarcliff Lodge site in 2014 and the Club's demonstration residence and offices

From 1955 to 1994, The King's College, a non-denominational coeducational Christian liberal arts college, relocated to the Briarcliff Lodge property. The school used the lodge building and built dormitories and academic buildings. During that time, in 1985, the lodge and the Briarcliff library were among sixty sites given historical markers by Westchester County Tricentennial Commission.

The New York State Board of Regents closed the school in 1994 due to financial difficulties and a deficiency of qualified faculty. After it closed, the nonprofit Tara Circle planned to build an Irish-American cultural, education, and athletic center, which was approved by the village in November 1994. The site was again purchased in 1996 by Blue Lake Properties.

The original 1902 Briarcliff Lodge building burned to the ground on September 20, 2003. The building was scheduled for demolition within 18 months (they had applied for demolition permits the week before the fire). The owner, Barrington Venture, had planned to raze the building and construct the Garlands, a 385-unit senior living center, which was opposed by local historians and architects. The fire thus ended the preservation effort.

The fire started near the main entrance and was suppressed by mid-day; it was deemed suspicious by fire officials, including Briarcliff's fire chief. Residents began calling at 6:37 am, after noticing smoke coming from the site. The Briarcliff Manor Fire Department was the first to arrive, at 6:40 am, later followed by Ossining, Sleepy Hollow, Millwood, Pleasantville, Chappaqua, Croton, and Pocantico Hills, totaling about 150 firefighters. The fire also spread to the lodge's nine-story west wing, through its wooden attic even though a concrete block firewall stood between both sections. The fire departments contained the fire to prevent it from spreading north or to the village water tower, and therefore saved the water tower and village and commercial radio antennae. The north wing was damaged but still standing.

After the fire, Westchester County's Cause & Origin Team sent an arson investigative unit, which sifted through the debris along with trained dogs, and found no evidence of arson. Most that remained of the original section was the stone facade and chimneys. Contemporary portions of the lodge and other campus buildings were later demolished.

From about 2010 to 2019, the site was redeveloped into a retirement home. Plans had existed for the site to be converted to senior living since 1999. In 2010, the Club at Briarcliff Manor built model homes and an information center on-site. The main senior-living facility was built from 2017 to 2019, although originally scheduled to open in 2013. Briarcliff Manor's village government took about five years to grant zoning changes, and several more years to approve the site plan.

The senior-living center has a luxury market, with plans for tennis courts, a health spa, gardens, a surround-sound theater, hiking trails, an indoor pool, a business center, a cocktail lounge, and multiple restaurants. The Club at Briarcliff Manor has sponsored a variety of village amenities, including a $2.25 million pledge for the village library's extension, sponsoring the extension's opening celebration, contributing $500,000 for a village fire truck, and replacing the water tower with a modern hydro-pneumatic pump station. In addition, the Club oversaw the former King's College football and soccer field replacement at a cost of $1.2 million, and transferred it to the village government around 2013.

== Architecture ==
=== Main building ===
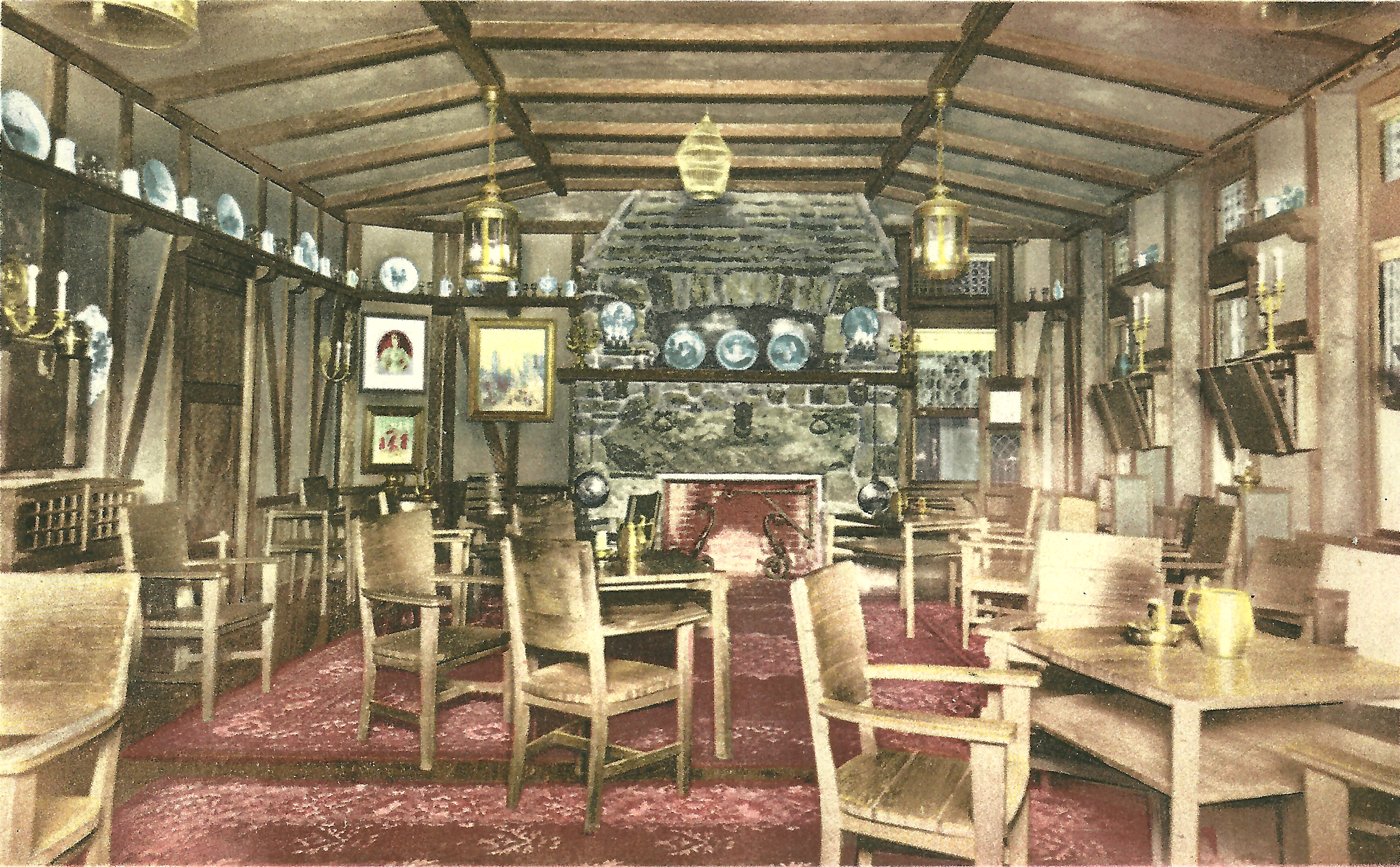
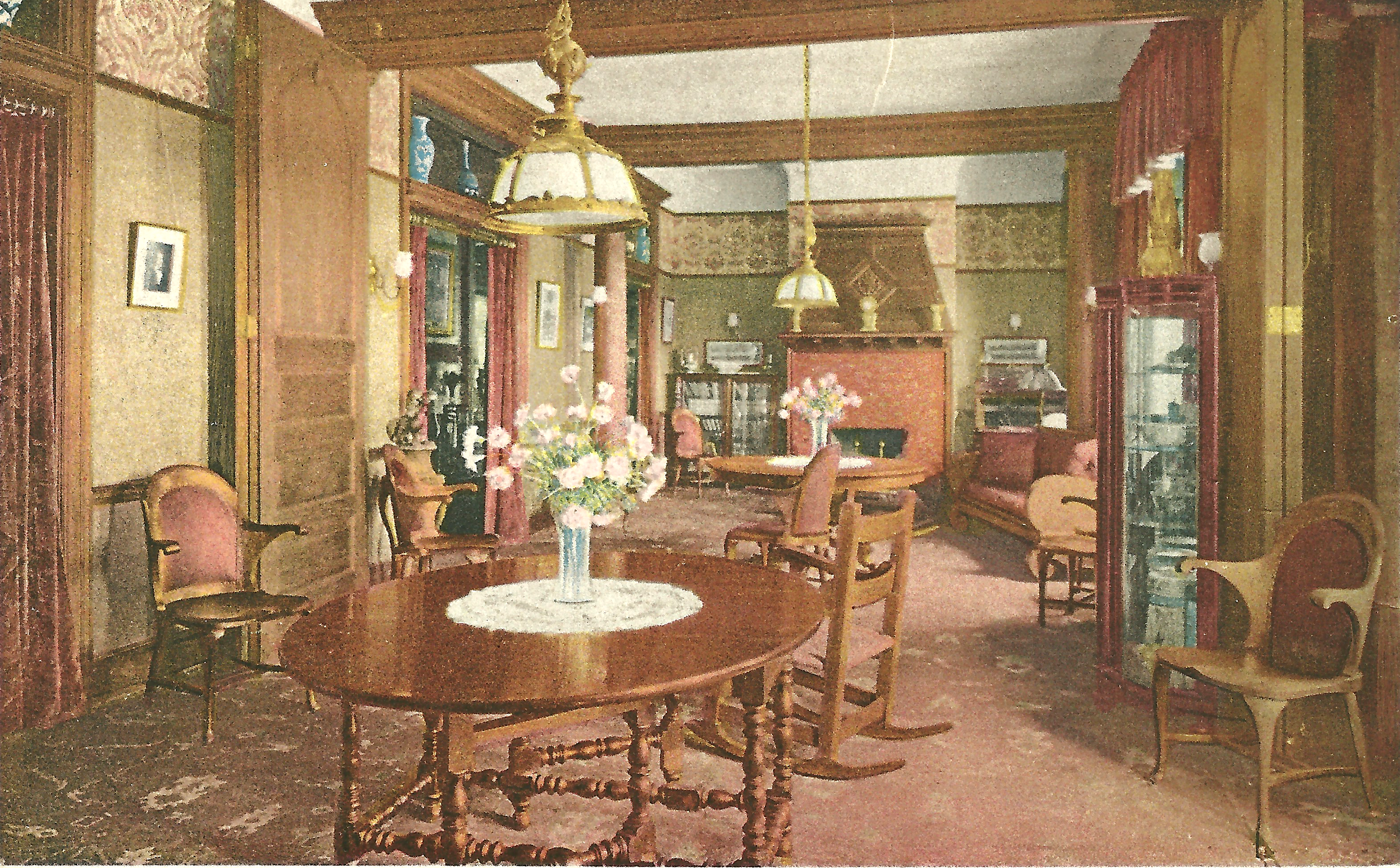
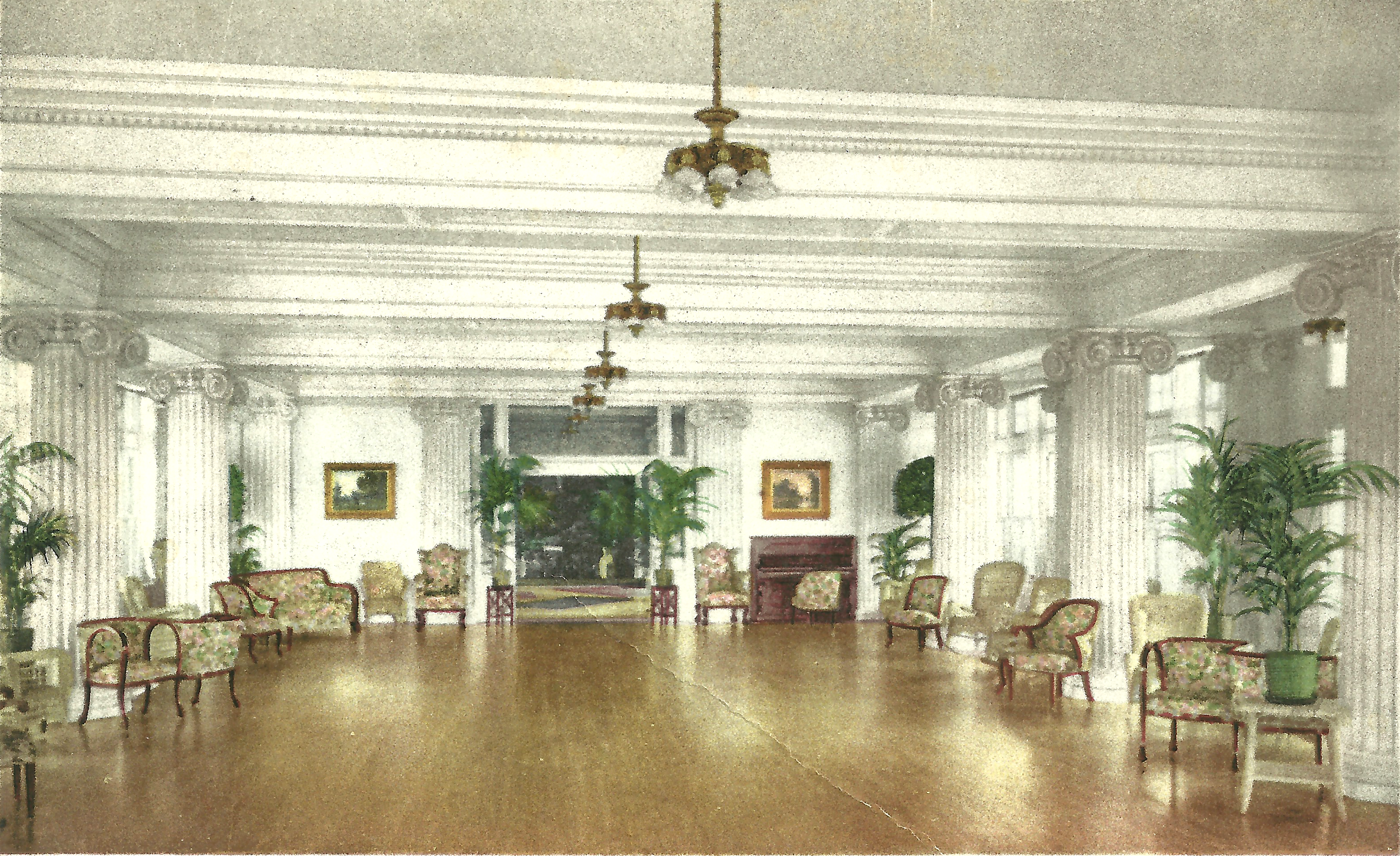
From left to right: the Dutch room, the library, and the ballroom
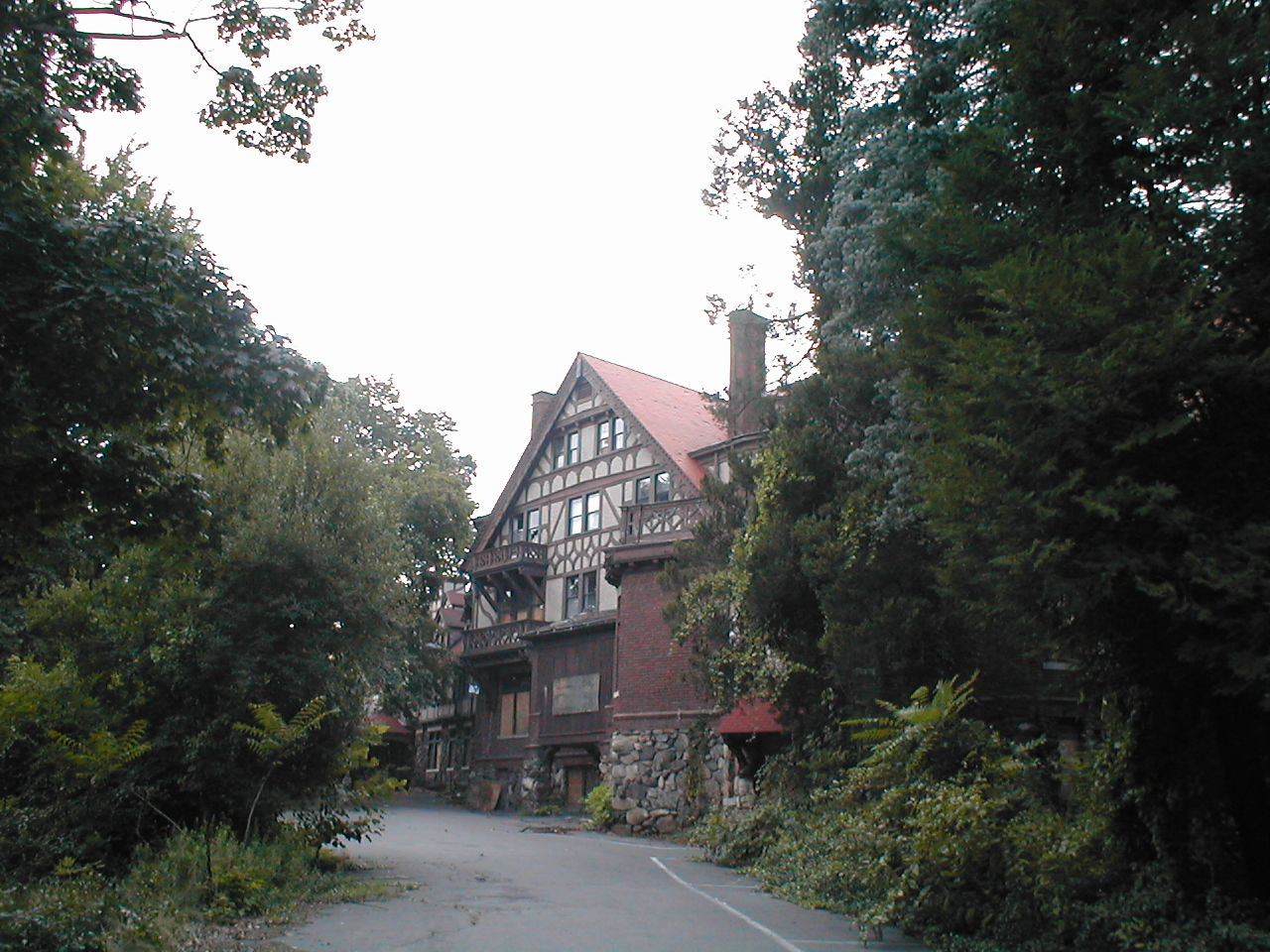
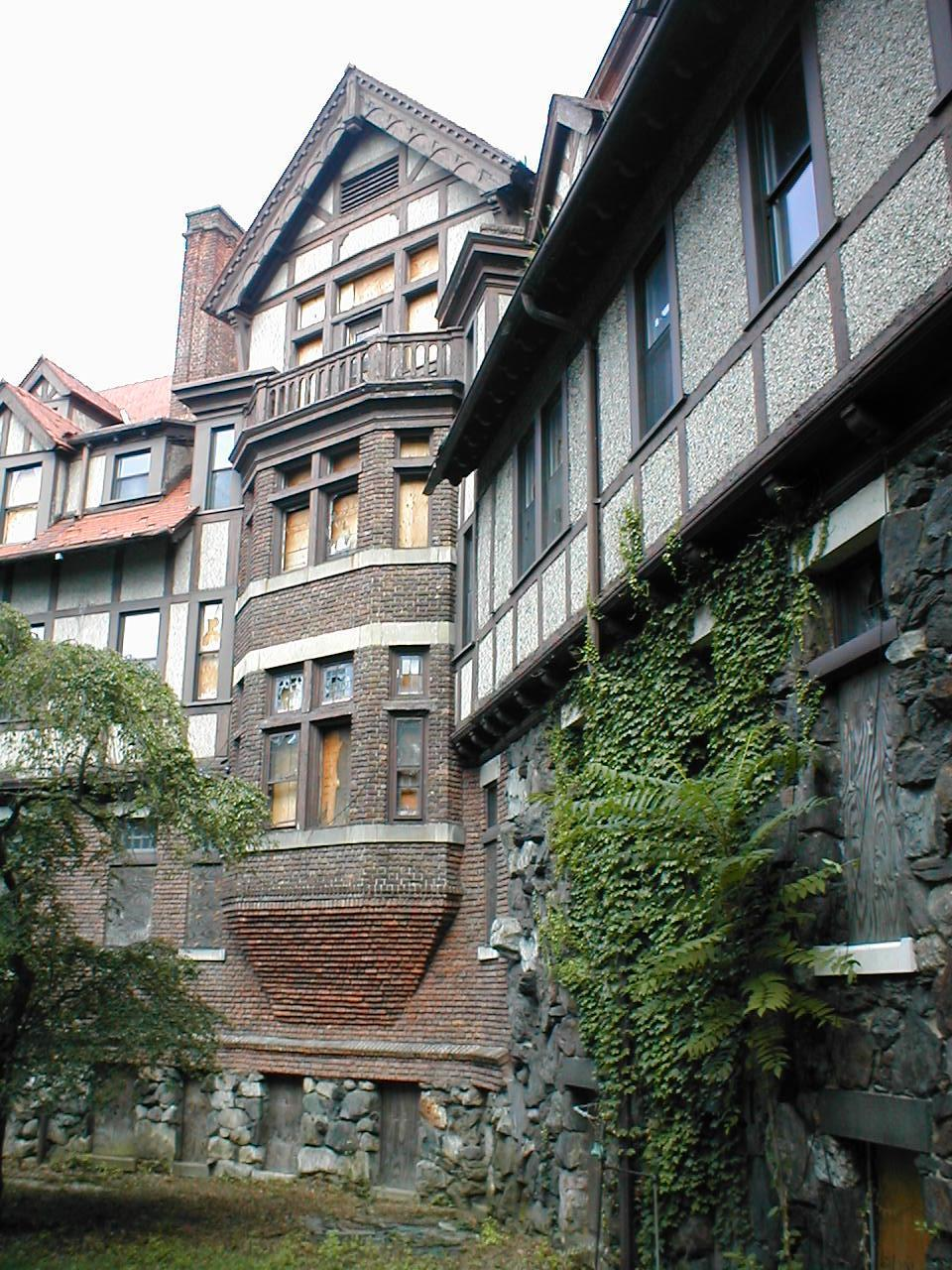
The east and west sides at the south end of the 1907 wing, 2003

The Briarcliff Lodge was located on a 184-acre (74 ha) site on the highest point of Law's estate. The original wing was designed by Pennsylvania architect Guy King, on the highest point of Walter Law's estate, which was about 600 feet above sea level and 29 miles (47 km) north of New York City.

The building's first-floor exterior walls were constructed of stones from nearby forests, and Indiana limestone was used for trimmings. the second-floor exterior walls were decorated with richly colored half timber and pebbledash. The roof had red shingles and tall red-brick chimneys. The main facade of the building was two stories high, while the third and fourth floor had many gables and dormer windows present on the roof. The overall design of the building was in the Tudor Revival-style, and was described to be in "the fashion of the old English inns". The building was 307 feet (94 m) long and had 93 rooms. Each room had Colonial mahogany furniture, a long-distance telephone, concealed fire escape, electric lights, and suction ventilators. As well, each room had an exterior wall with a window.

In 1902, the hotel's first floor held its reception rooms, parlors, dining rooms, library, and a lounge area called the Dutch kitchen. The library was adjacent to and north of the large dining room. The ballroom had classical fluted Ionic columns and Italian-marble walls. Thomas Edison was honored there in 1909. The Dutch kitchen had decorations and furnishings from Holland and was based on a restaurant in Edam. It had rough adze-hewn timbers, a hipped ceiling, etchings from England, and European and American oil paintings.

Much of the furniture was purchased from Law's former employer, home furnishings pioneer W. & J. Sloane. Art and decorations throughout the building were largely sourced from markets in Europe and Asia, and included expensive paintings, bronzes, marble sculptures, rare books, and carved antique furniture. The hotel also had a Chinese tea room and a dark room for amateur photographers. The kitchen was kept clean (such that it was proposed to serve lunches in the kitchen). It was reported to be of elegant design, utilizing white tile and marble. The kitchen equipment was of white porcelain and aluminum, and included numerous glass-lined refrigerators. It sourced its milk, butter, eggs, and vegetables from Briarcliff Farms. The kitchen's trash was frozen to prevent odors before its eventual removal; the lodge also had an ice-producing plant that used sterilized well water.

John Clark Udall oversaw construction of the north wing in 1907, increasing the number of rooms to 150. In 1909, Udall oversaw a 72-room seven-story west wing, further increasing the rooms to 221.

=== Garage ===
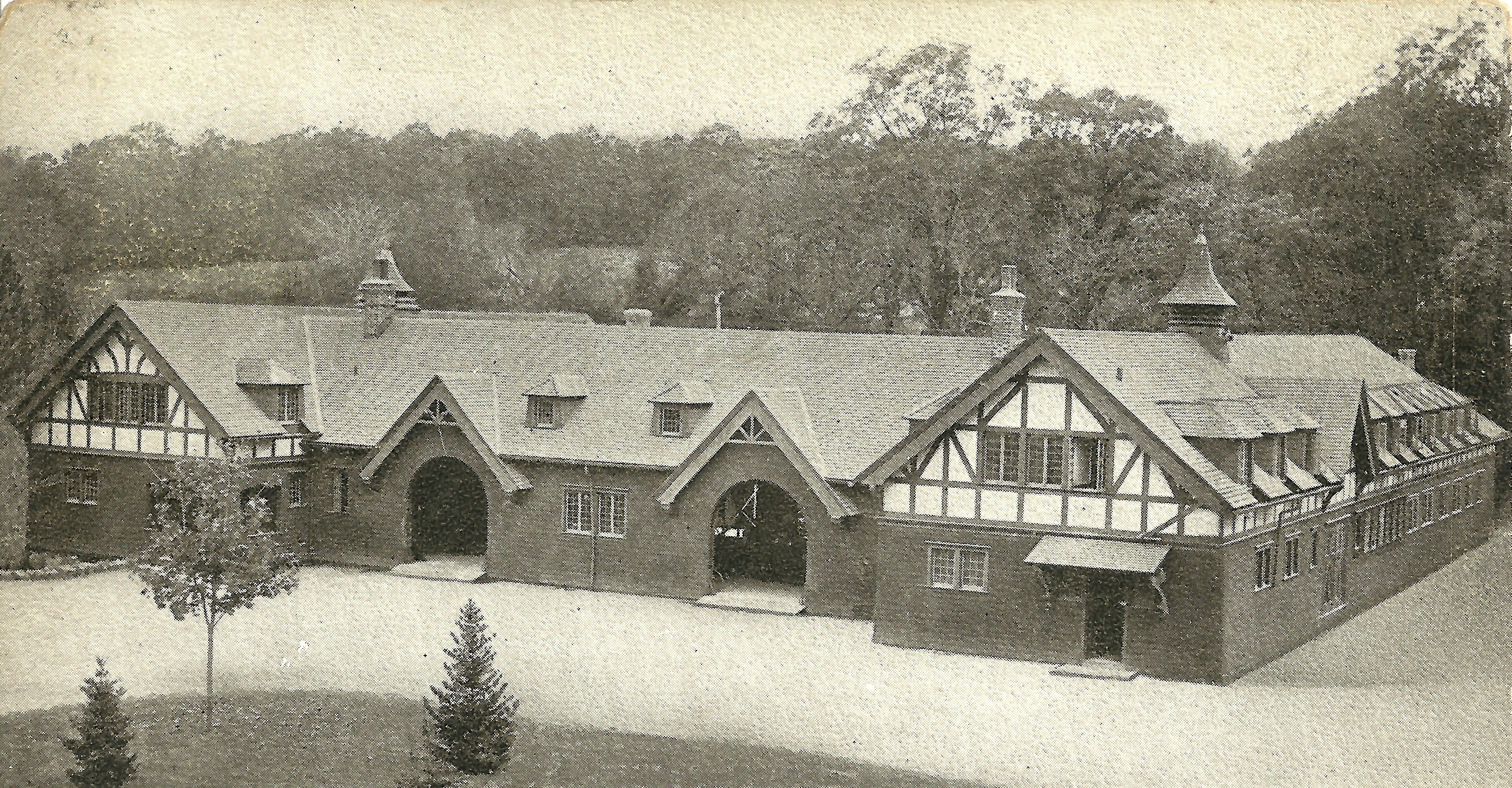
The garage building

In its first operating year, a stable was built for the lodge, at the lodge's south driveway about 100 yards from Scarborough Road. In 1909 an addition was built (of 62 by 126 feet) and the entire structure became used for an automobile garage. The interior of the old stable was replaced. The east end held a commercial kitchen, dining room, and a billiard and smoking room. The west end held a repair shop. The front of the building held supply rooms, closets, and an office. The upstairs held bedrooms and bathrooms for the chauffeurs.

=== Other buildings ===
Nearby the lodge was the amusement building, with a dance hall, swimming pool, bowling alley, squash court, and billiard room.

== Notable guests ==
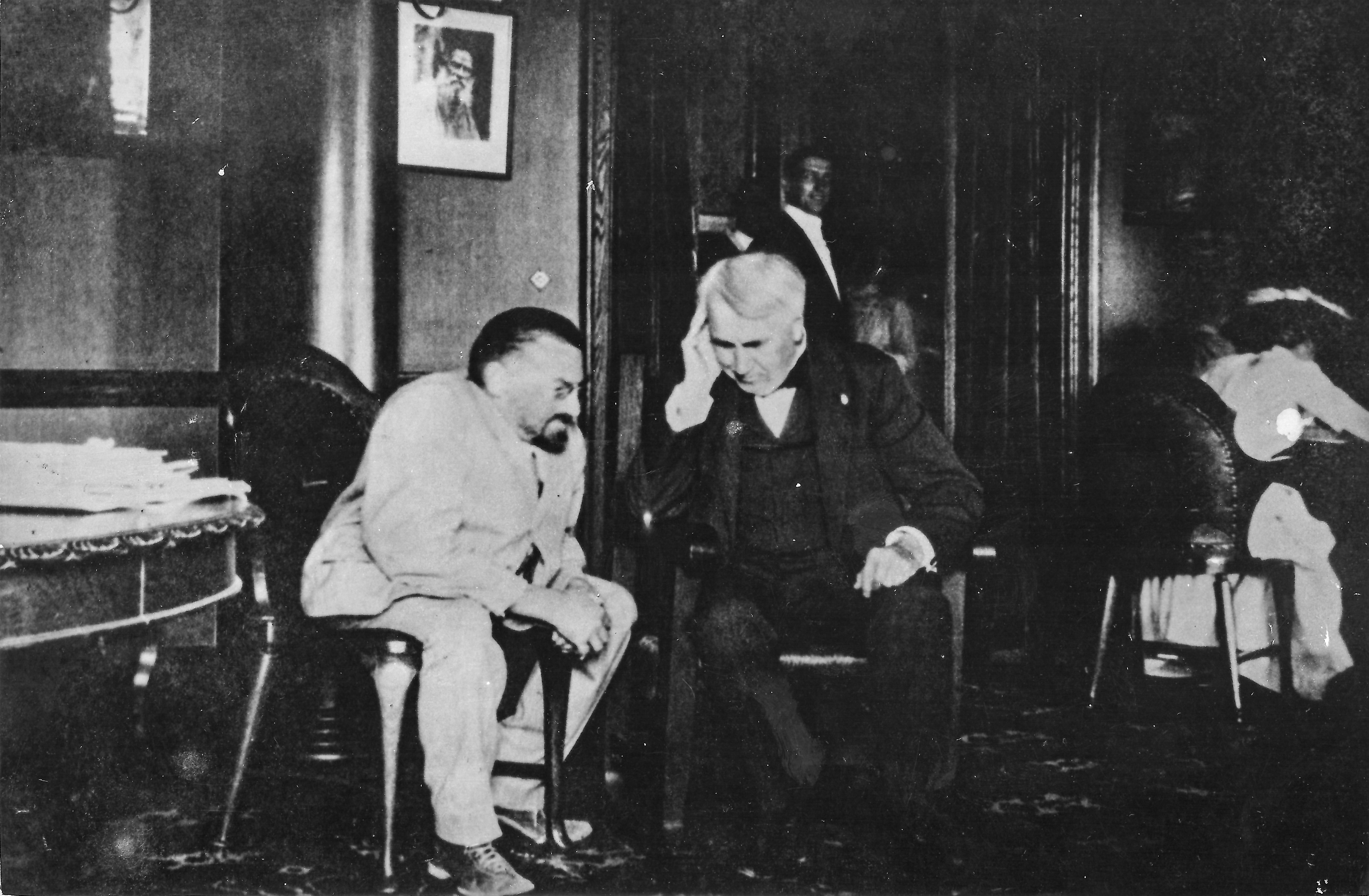
Thomas Edison and Charles Proteus Steinmetz in the library of the lodge during a meeting of the Edison Lighting Company (1909)

Franklin and Eleanor Roosevelt were guests at the Briarcliff Lodge. In the early 1930s, Eleanor spoke there several times on behalf of the Women's Democratic Club of Mount Pleasant; her daughter Anna Roosevelt Halsted was chairwoman of the club at the time. In 1930, Franklin spoke there as New York Governor to the Westchester County Bankers Association.

John W. Davis, U.S. representative and nominee for president against Calvin Coolidge, visited the lodge in 1924. U.S. senator Chauncey Depew visited in 1924 and 1927. Composer and pianist Percy Grainger gave a recital at the ballroom of the lodge in 1925.

The final German emperor Wilhelm II's son, Crown Prince Wilhelm, was a guest at the Lodge for the 1909 Hudson-Fulton Celebration. He led a Prussian regiment in a parade of fifty floats held in honor of the celebration in New York.

Other notable guests included Thomas Edison, Tallulah Bankhead, Sarah Bernhardt, Boris Bakhmeteff, Johnny Weissmuller, Jimmy Walker, Babe Ruth, Edward S. Curtis, George B. Cortelyou, Mary Pickford, F. W. Woolworth, J. P. Morgan, Warner Baxter, Vincent Richards, and Ernestine Schumann-Heink. Elihu Root, Al Smith, and a king of Siam were guests at the lodge in the 1920s, and John Campbell frequently hosted parties there.

Ella Holmes White and her partner, Marie Grice Young, lived in the Briarcliff Lodge; an extension known as the Oak Room was constructed on the building's east side for them. The two held a long-term lease there before they boarded the RMS Titanic in 1912 and survived its sinking; they continued to live at the lodge until later in their lives.

== Influences ==
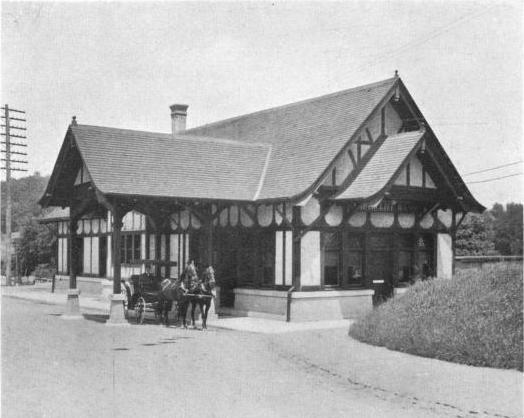
Southwest view of Law's train station in 1907

In 1906, Walter Law replaced the Briarcliff Manor railroad station and moved the original building to serve as Millwood's station in the nearby Millwood hamlet to the north. The new Briarcliff station, now part of the Briarcliff Manor Public Library (the village library) was modeled in the style of his Briarcliff Lodge, and had Mission-style furniture, rugs, and flowers decorating the interior.

Central Briarcliff West is a neighborhood which has a number of mansions built by 20th-century millionaires who stayed at the Briarcliff Lodge and later built estates in the area.

The Seven Sisters, a 1915 romantic-comedy silent film was filmed at the Briarcliff Lodge.

== See also ==
- History of Briarcliff Manor
- List of hotel fires in the United States
