= Ella Holmes White =

American Titanic survivor (1856–1942)

Ellen Holmes White
- Holmes circa 1910
- Born: Ella B. Holmes White; December 18, 1856; New York City, New York, U.S.
- Died: January 31, 1942 (aged 85); New York City, New York, U.S.

Ella B. Holmes White (December 18, 1856 – January 31, 1942) was an American woman who was a survivor of the sinking of the RMS Titanic.

== Biography ==
Ella Bertha Holmes was born on December 18, 1856, in New York, the daughter of Edwin Holmes and Eliza Ann Richardson. She had two brothers and a sister. Holmes later moved to Briarcliff Manor, New York, staying at the Briarcliff Lodge (her apartment was The Oak Room), and when in New York City she would stay at the Waldorf-Astoria or the Plaza Hotel.

On December 12, 1894, she married John Stuart White. White died on May 19, 1897. Holmes never remarried. Until her death she lived and travelled with 20‑years younger Marie Grice Young, a piano teacher and fellow Titanic survivor whose pupils included the children of President Theodore Roosevelt.

Ella Holmes White died in New York City on January 31, 1942, while living at the Plaza Hotel (with Young). Her will left to Young, personal effects and life estate in a trust to yield US$250 ($4,926 in 2025 dollars) per month for life. Historian Jonathan Ned Katz has suggested that Holmes had an intimate relationship with Marie Grice Young, in a time when same-sex relationships were usually kept very quiet.

== Titanic ==
Ella Holmes White boarded the Titanic at Cherbourg with her maid Amelia Bissette and manservant Sante Ringhini. She travelled first class sharing a cabin with Marie Young. They also brought along some exotic French-bred chickens, intending to keep them at their New York country home. White and her maid were rescued in lifeboat 8. Her manservant Sante Ringhini died. She later testified before the American Inquiry that the Titanic had broken in two before sinking.
