= Edwin Holmes (inventor) =

American burglar alarm inventor (1820–1901)

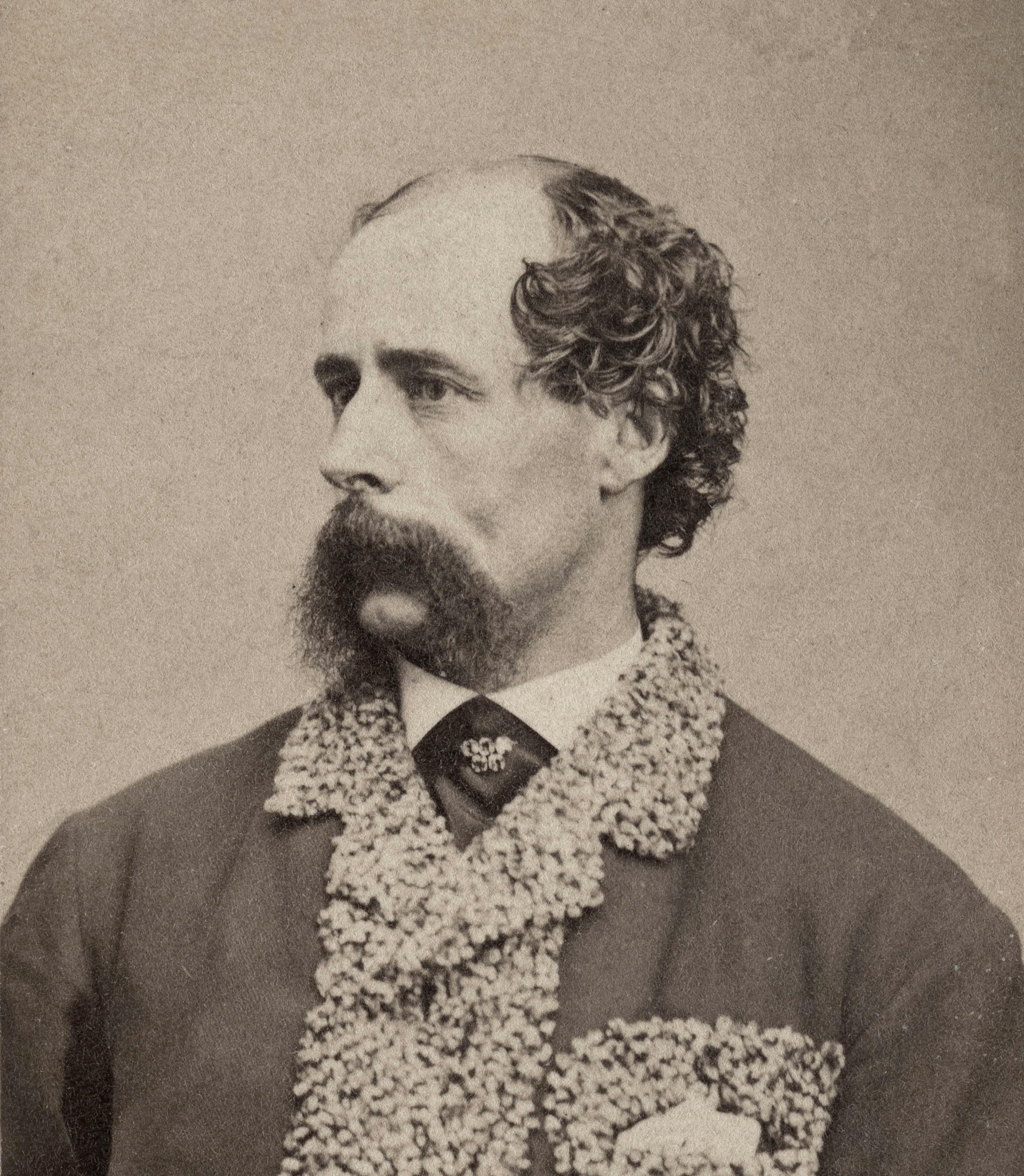
- Born: April 25, 1820; West Boylston, Massachusetts, US
- Died: 1901
- Known for: Burglar alarm

Edwin Holmes (April 25, 1820 – 1901) was an American businessman who is credited with inventing, commercializing the electromagnetic burglar alarm and with establishing the first burglar alarm networks.

== Biography ==
Holmes was born in West Boylston, Massachusetts, to Sally Graves and Thomas Holmes. His father was from New Hampshire where he served as the town postmaster. Holmes married Eliza Ann Richardson. They had four children (two boys and two girls). One girl was Titanic survivor Ella Holmes White.

Edwin started his business in 1849 in Boston, as a seller of household items and entrepreneur, and acquired skills which later helped him in establishing the burglar alarm industry.

== Burglar alarm ==
The alarm was patented in 1853 by the Reverend Augustus Russell Pope (1819–1858) of Somerville, Massachusetts. Edwin Holmes acquired Pope's patent rights in 1857 for US$1500 and manufactured the device in his factory in Boston, Massachusetts. He began to sell them in 1858. His son Edwin Thomas Holmes took over his father's company after his death and documented the events in his biography, A Wonderful Fifty Years.

Initially, people were fearful of and skeptical about using electricity for alarms, and the business did not go well. Therefore, in 1859, in search of a new and bigger market Holmes moved his business to New York, which was then perceived as a place where "all the country's burglars made their home". There, by 1866 he installed 1,200 home alarms and began successful marketing among business enterprises. By 1877, he established the first network of alarms monitored by a central station in New York and sent his son to copy this system in Boston. Edwin Thomas, however, discovered that the network could use the pre-existing phone cables instead of laying its own. In this way, he quickly assembled a 700-alarm network, which his father then copied in New York.

In 1878, Holmes became the president of the newly established Bell Phone Company. While he sold his interests two years later for US$100,000, he kept his rights to use the company phone lines for his alarm system. The use of electricity for street lights in 1880 changed the market, as people started accepting electrical models. The American Telephone and Telegraph Company bought the Holmes Burglar business in 1905, linking it to emergency call systems for contacting police and fire fighting personnel. After World War II, many inventions were introduced into the business of home alarm systems. It became less expensive and more versatile for use in the 1980s and by the middle of the 1990s the system had become a standard feature. In the most advanced examples of anti-burglary systems, motion detectors, surveillance equipment and electronic tracking devices are being used.

== See also ==
- American District Telegraph
