= Ossining Public Library =

Public library in Westchester County, New York

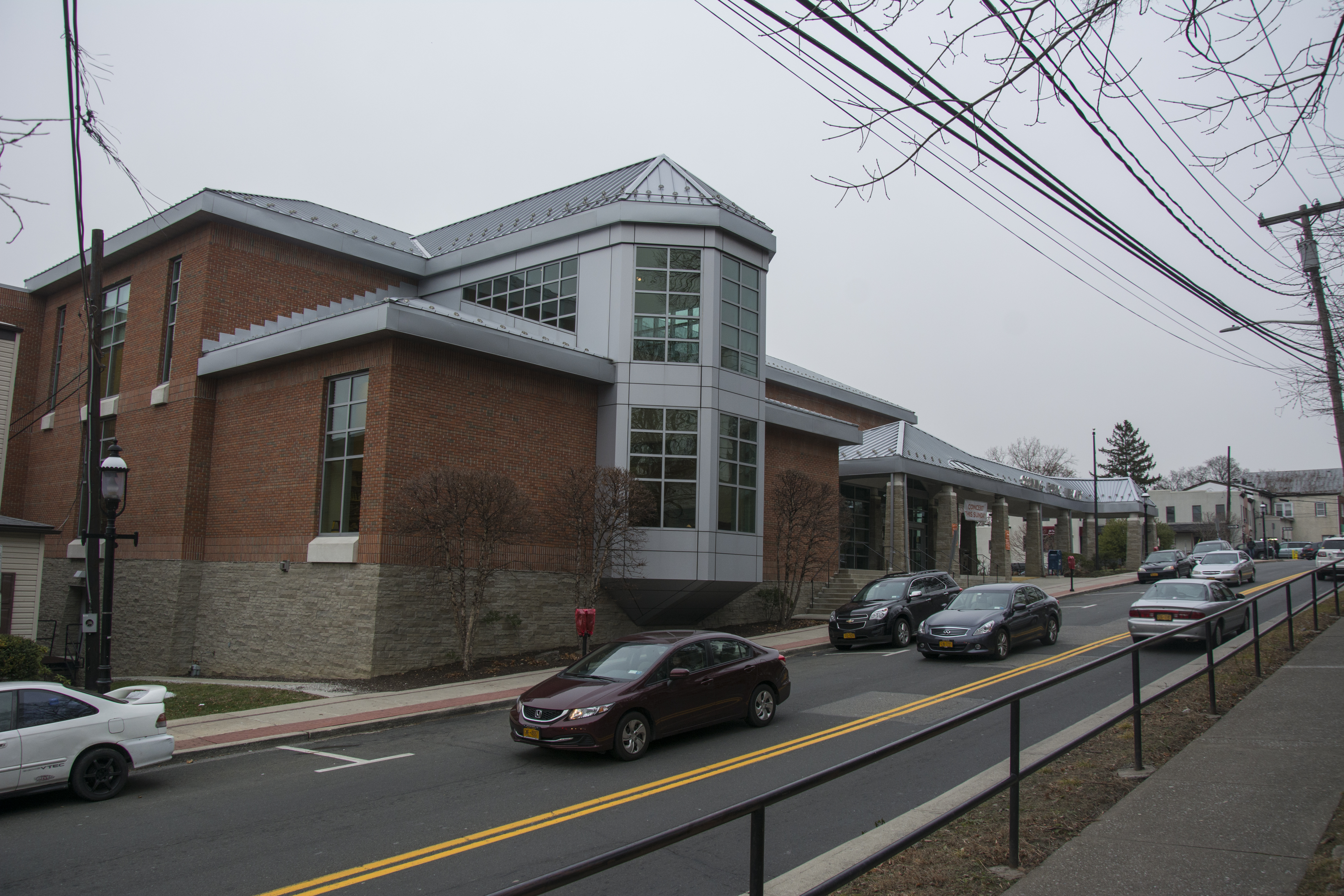
- Main, southeast facade
- 41°09′51″N 73°51′37″W
- Location: Ossining, New York
- Type: School District Public Library

Collection
- Size: 117,987

Access and use
- Circulation: 308,279
- Population served: 34,230

Other information
- Director: Karen LaRocca-Fels
- Employees: 33
- Website: Official website

The Ossining Public Library (OPL) is a public library in serving the village of Ossining, New York. The library serves Ossining's school district, including the town of Ossining and neighboring areas.

The library was created in the 1880s at the village's Park School. It was first chartered as the Sing Sing Public Library in 1893. Its first permanent location was a Carnegie library on Croton Avenue, replaced by a modern building in 1968, and again replaced with the current facility in 2007.

== History ==
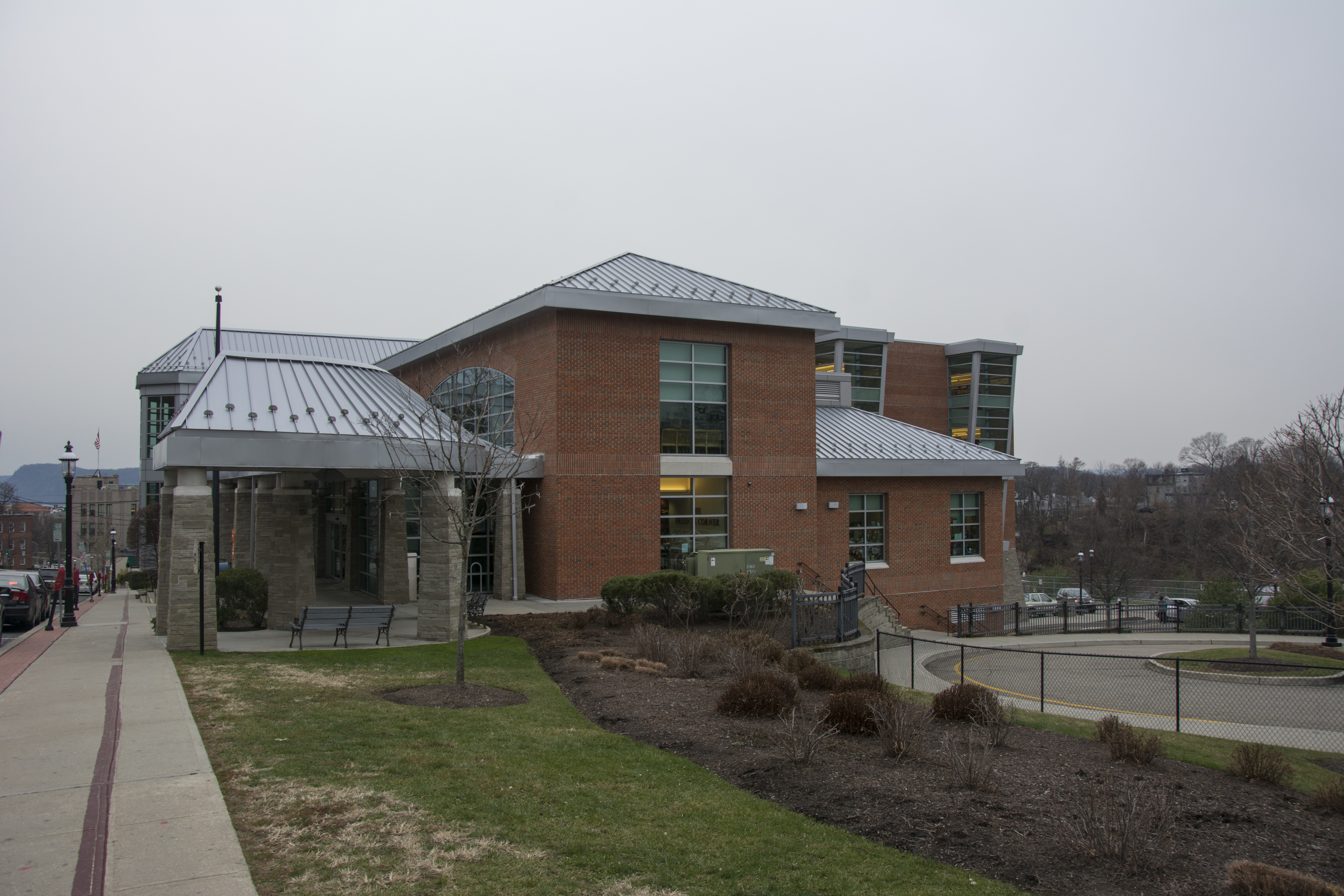
Northeast facade

The library began as a collection of 700 books in the superintendent's office at Park School in the 1880s. It was first chartered in 1893 as the Sing Sing Public Library. It was renamed the Ossining Public Library in 1901. In 1903, the library moved to the Twiggar Building on Main Street, and a few years later to the YWCA. The library was looking to expand, and so a letter was written to philanthropist Andrew Carnegie, noted for his funding of public library buildings. Carnegie funded the new library, a Carnegie library, on Croton Avenue. The building was of brick, with arched windows and large heavy wooden doors at the entrance. Desiring further expansion, the Carnegie building was torn down in 1967, and its replacement opened in September 1968. This library was too small by 2003, when Ossining residents voted to build another building.

A new library was approved in 2003, with a public vote of 1,640 to 633. It was built from 2005 to 2007, at a cost of $15.8 million. The project involved purchasing the adjacent lot and building the new library there; demolishing the old structure once the new building was complete. The new library opened on March 25, 2007 and added many new or enhanced services, including over 50 public internet terminals, the 205-seat Camille Budarz Theater, an art gallery, and Westchester County's first radio frequency (RFID) circulation system. 1,000 visitors attended on the opening day, which include guided tours and a piano performance by Ossining resident Camille Antoinette Budarz. The theater's Steinway piano was once hers.

In 2018, for the library's 125th anniversary, a time capsule was created and buried on the library grounds, to be opened on the 150th anniversary in 2043. Other celebratory events, including a film series, library history lecture, ice cream social, and genealogy program, were scheduled as part of the celebration. As well, the library was gifted a desk that was the circulation desk of the Carnegie building, now serving as the library's information desk.

== Location and architecture ==
The 2007 building has four floors and 48,000 square feet (4,500 m^{2}). It was designed by Beatty, Harvey and Associates, and is modern, made of glass, metal, and brick, made larger and more open than the prior building. It is on a steep hill, directly adjacent to a parking lot, where the 1968 library stood. The new library has features that allude to historic Ossining architecture, and uses natural stone and brick, materials of the Hudson Valley. The curving entrance has wide concrete steps, modeled after the steps at the Metropolitan Museum of Art. The library uses geothermal energy for heating and cooling.

The lower level has a cafe, art gallery, and theater; the first floor has the circulation desk, media section, multicultural collection, and children's room. The second floor has the reference and nonfiction collections and the teen room; the mezzanine level at the top has the fiction collection. The main reading room of Ossining's library was named in honor of longtime Ossining resident and author John Cheever. The room was designed resembling a living room, including a stone-clad gas fireplace; the room also features artifacts of Cheever's. The lower level art gallery includes two sections: the Main Gallery and the Hallway Gallery. The gallery has monthly art exhibits, and sometimes has two to three shows per month.

The former library, completed in August 1968, was modern, square, and flat-roofed. It had 17,390 square feet (1,616 m^{2}). It was designed by Malsin & Reiman and cost $574,000.

== Operations ==
The collections of the library include 117,987 items. As a member of the 38-member Westchester Library System, the Ossining Public Library can also offer its patrons access to the holdings of the other county libraries.

The library is chartered as a School District Public Library, serving residents of the Ossining Union Free School District. It serves areas of the town of Ossining, Chappaqua, Yorktown, and Briarcliff Manor, with overlapping service in parts of the town of Yorktown (also served by the John C. Hart Memorial Library) and village of Briarcliff Manor (also served by the Briarcliff Manor Public Library).

Given Ossining's large Hispanic population, the library has services including a weekly English Conversation Group, English as a Second Language classes twice weekly, a Spanish film series, a multicultural collection, and performances and celebrations during National Hispanic Heritage Month.

The library's collections include several non-traditional circulating items: nature observation kits, cake pans, fishing poles, and Wii games. The library also offers free admission to local and regional museums and nature centers.
