= Marie Grice Young =

Singer and Titanic survivor (1876–1959)

- Born: January 5, 1876
- Died: July 27, 1959 (aged 83); New York City, US
- Occupation: Piano teacher
- Known for: Survivor of Titanic

Marie Grice Young (January 5, 1876 – July 27, 1959) was an American woman who survived the sinking of RMS Titanic.

== Early life ==
Marie Grice Young was born on January 5, 1876, the daughter of Samuel Grice Young and Margaret Brown (Wilson) Young. She belonged to a political upper-class family in Washington, and was the niece-in-law of Alexander Robey Shepherd, who had married her aunt, Mary Grice Young. The Young Family was originally from Virginia.

== Music and the Roosevelt family ==
In 1897 she studied music under John Porter Lawrence. In 1904 she toured with a musical reading, "Enoch Arden", Young at the piano and Helen Weil reading the poem. The Young family was very involved in music. Young's brother, Wilson Young, was himself involved as his wife was a known soprano in New York, and his daughter Hildreth Young also eventually became a singer. Young herself also sang as soprano occasionally at their local St. Matthew's Catholic Church.

In the middle of the decade of the 1900s, Young was a piano teacher who numbered among her pupils Ethel, Archibald, and Quentin Roosevelt, the children of President Theodore Roosevelt. Her extensive involvement with the Roosevelt family allowed her in 1907 to provide information regarding management of their household. She remained in the Washington, D.C. area until around 1911.

== Titanic ==
For a long time she shared her house with Ella Holmes White; already in 1911 there are reports of the two of them travelling together by car in France. Young was a close personal friend of Thomas Nelson Page and his wife, Florence Lathrop Field.

Marie Grice Young boarded the Titanic on April 10, 1912, at Cherbourg with White, traveling in first class. They also brought along some exotic French-bred chickens, intending to keep them at their New York country home. She was helped into her lifeboat by Archibald Butt, President Roosevelt's military aide. She was covered by The Washington Post as one of the several women in the lifeboats that took charge to ensure more lives were saved by taking passengers from the waters into the lifeboats.

Historian Jonathan Ned Katz suggested that she was intimately related to her travel partner, 20-year older Ella Holmes White, making her an LGBT passenger aboard Titanic.

== Death ==
When White died in 1942, she was living at the Plaza Hotel in Manhattan with Young. White's will bequeathed to Young "personal effects and life estate in a trust to yield $250 per month for life" ($4,926 in 2025 dollars). Young died on July 27, 1959.
