= Association library =

An association library is a library that is privately controlled, but which meets the statutory definition for a public library in a given state of the United States. The association governing this type of library is established for the express purpose of governing said library (i.e., a board is established for the purpose of governing the library; the library is not governed, for example, by a school board, which has other, non-library-related, purposes). Association libraries are especially common in states such as New York and Vermont; in New York State, association libraries are one of four types of public library.
