= Millwood station (New York Central Railroad) =

Millwood
- The former depot at Millwood in June 2006.

General information
- Coordinates: 41.189224°N 73.797684°W
- Tracks: 0

History
- Opened: 1881
- Closed: May 29, 1958

Former services
Preceding station	New York Central Railroad	Following station
Kitchawan toward Brewster	Putnam Division	Briarcliff Manor toward Sedgwick Avenue
Location

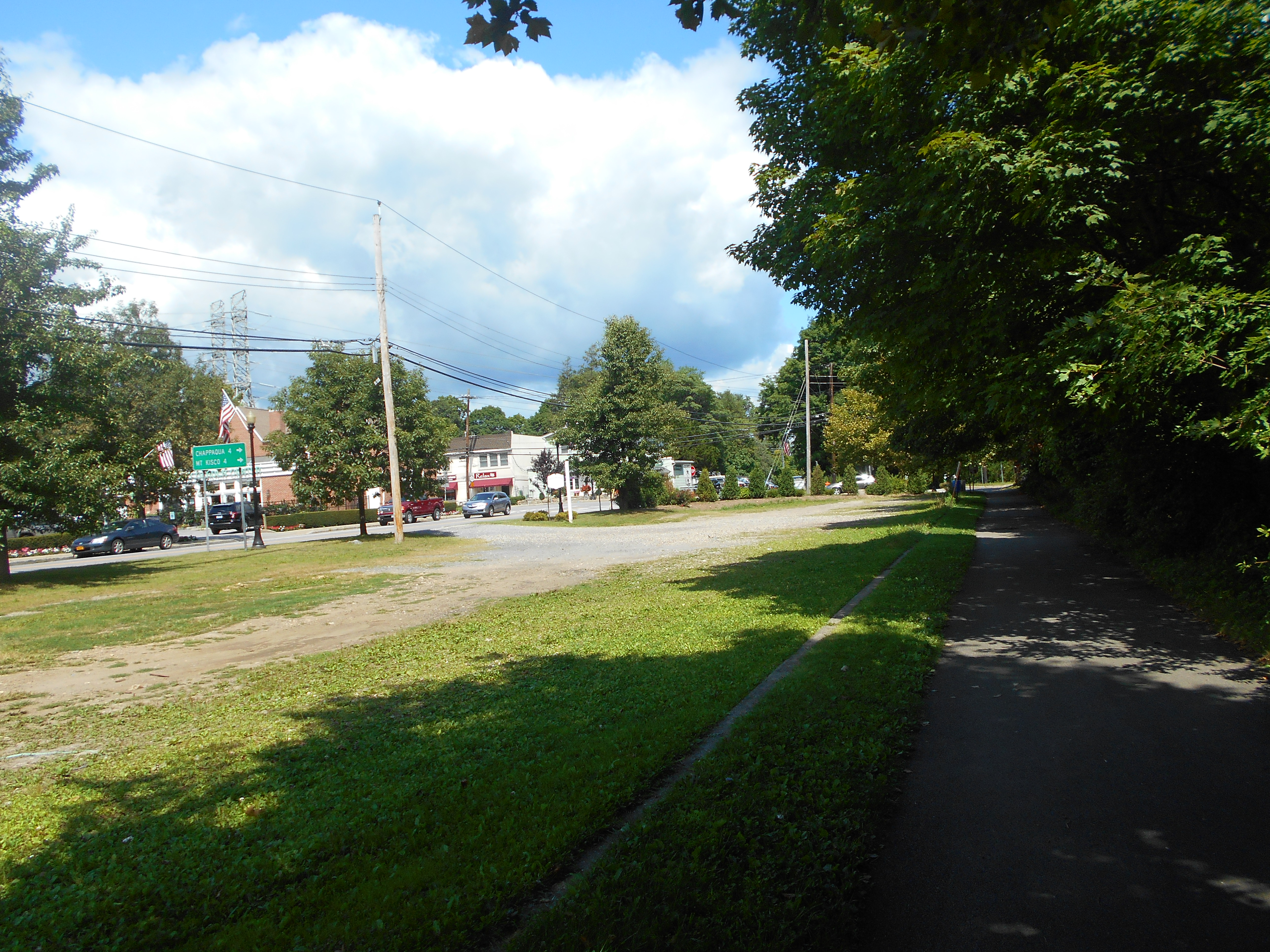
Site of the Millwood station

Millwood was a railroad station on the New York and Putnam Railroad in the hamlet of Millwood in New Castle, New York. It was located on Station Road just south of the southeast corner of the west end of the NY 120/133 overlap. Originally built by the New York and Putnam Railroad in 1881, this later became the Putnam Division of the New York Central Railroad. The original station house was built in 1888 but burnt to the ground soon after. The station was replaced in 1910 when the old Briarcliff Manor station was moved by flat car to the current location. The Putnam Line ended passenger service in 1958; the line was abandoned and now serves as the North County Trailway rail trail.

Demolition on May 9, 2012

After the line's passenger use ended, the station variously served as a real estate office and fruit and vegetable market.

The station, which had fallen into a state of disrepair, was demolished on May 9, 2012 after it was determined that it would be too costly to repair. According to demolition workers, several support beams on the inside of the building had fallen down, and several others had nearly been eaten through by insects. The station was identical to the Ardsley, Yorktown Heights, Baldwin Place, and two other stations on the line.
