= MV Commander =

- M/V COMMANDER
- U.S. National Register of Historic Places
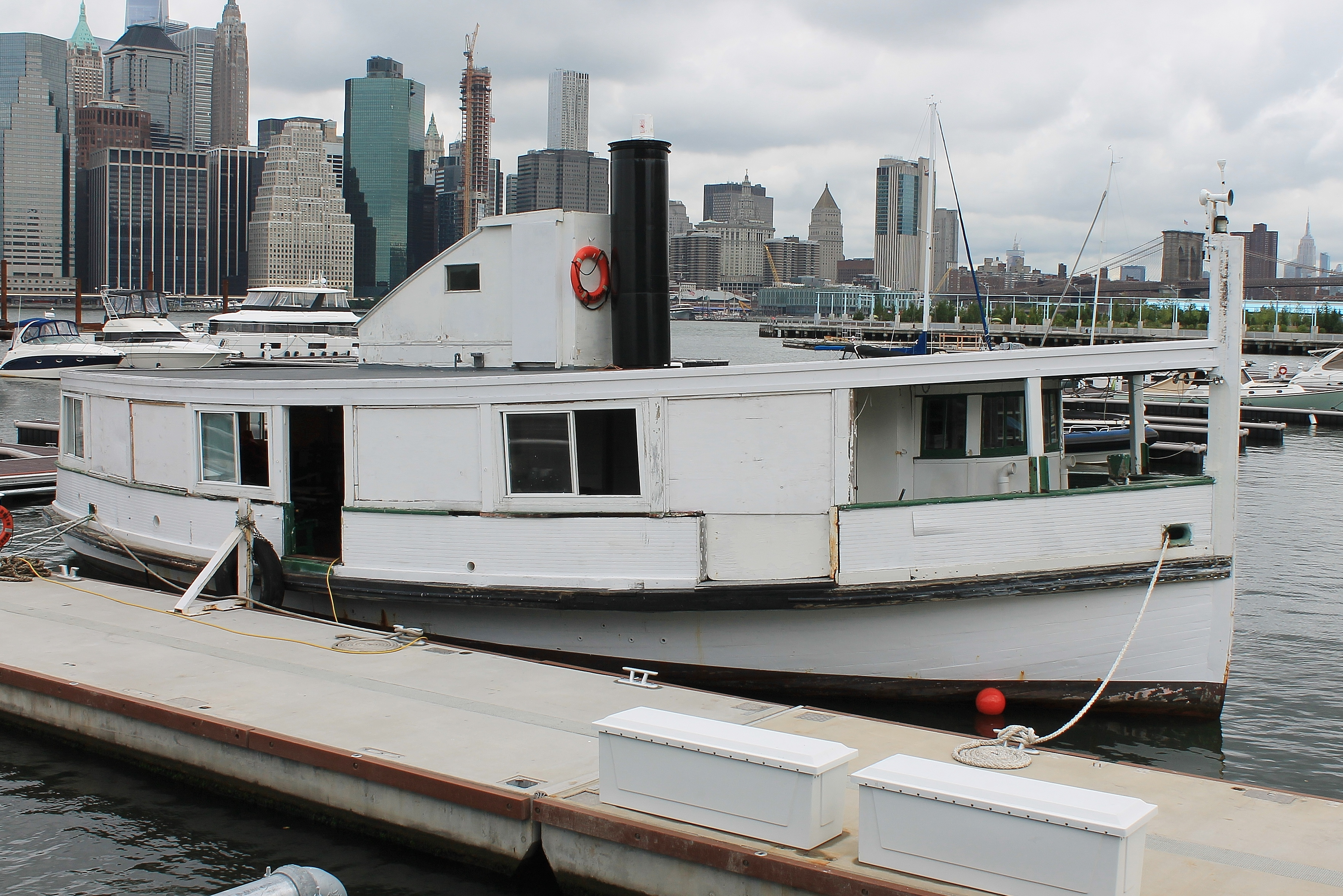
- Commander moored in Brooklyn Bridge Park, July 2018

- Location within New York Location within the United States
- Nearest city: West Haverstraw, New York
- Coordinates: 41°12′59″N 73°58′03″W
- Area: less than one acre
- Built: 1917
- Architect: Beele Wallace Co.
- NRHP reference No.: 84002951
- Added to NRHP: September 27, 1984

MV Commander is a historic motor vessel built in 1917 and designed by Beele Wallace Co. of Morehead City, North Carolina, United States. She is homeported at the Haverstraw Marina in West Haverstraw, Rockland County, New York. She is a wooden 275-passenger excursion boat approximately 60 feet in length, 25 feet in breadth (18.3 m × 7.6 m), and weighing 70 tons. MV Commander was built as an excursion boat for service between Rockaway and Brooklyn, New York.

She was leased to the United States Navy on 17 September 1917 and commissioned on 3 January 1918. She operated around the New York Navy Yard during World War I to outfit submarine chasers and tow manned observation balloons off the entrances of New York Harbor. The Commander was decommissioned from the Navy on 5 February 1919 and returned to her civilian owner.

The Commander spent the next 8 decades with Rockaway Boat Line, one of the longest uninterrupted services in excursion boat history in the United States. She is now operated in the Hudson River Highlands as an excursion vessel. The Commander is the only former U.S. Naval vessel of World War I vintage still operating under her own motor power and in its original condition.

She was listed on the National Register of Historic Places in 1984.

And in late 2019, the boat was listed for sale, and as of early 2020 she has not been sold.
