= Hudson Link =

Bus service in New York

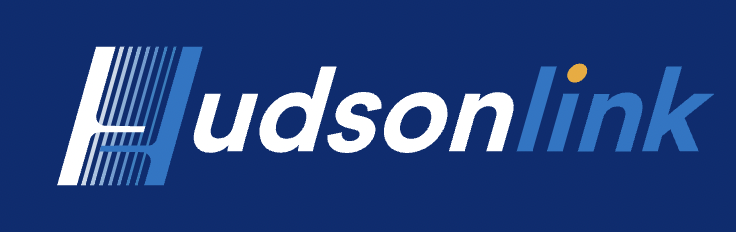

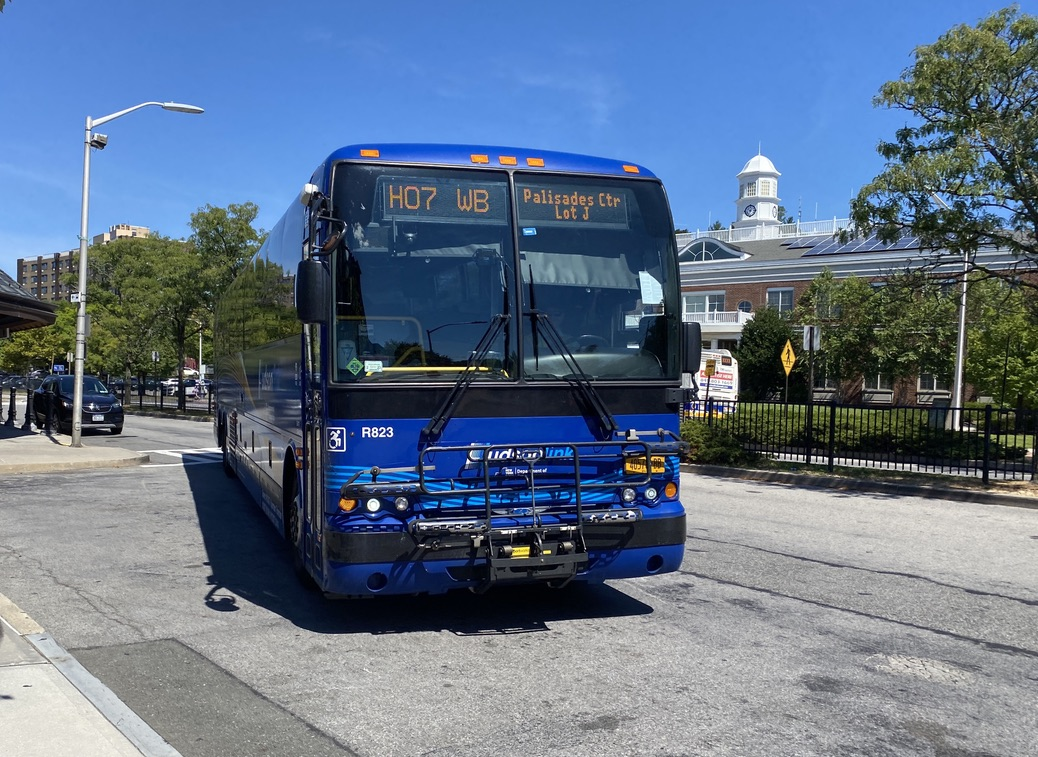
- Hudson Link bus at Tarrytown in 2022
- Commenced operation: 2018
- Locale: Hudson Valley
- Service area: Rockland and Westchester Counties
- Service type: Commuter bus service
- Alliance: Metro-North Railroad
- Routes: 6
- Stops: 18
- Hubs: Palisades Center
- Fleet: 31 Prevost X3-45
- Daily ridership: 41,355 (August 2019)
- Operator: Coach USA
- Website: ridehudsonlink.com

Hudson Link is a commuter bus service in Rockland and Westchester counties in New York State, funded by the New York State Department of Transportation. Service began operation in 2018, replacing Transport of Rockland's Tappan ZEExpress service. Hudson Link operates 6 routes along the Interstate 287 corridor, connecting Suffern and White Plains via the Tappan Zee Bridge. The service is currently operated by Coach USA since June 2026. Previously, the service was operated by Transdev.

== History ==
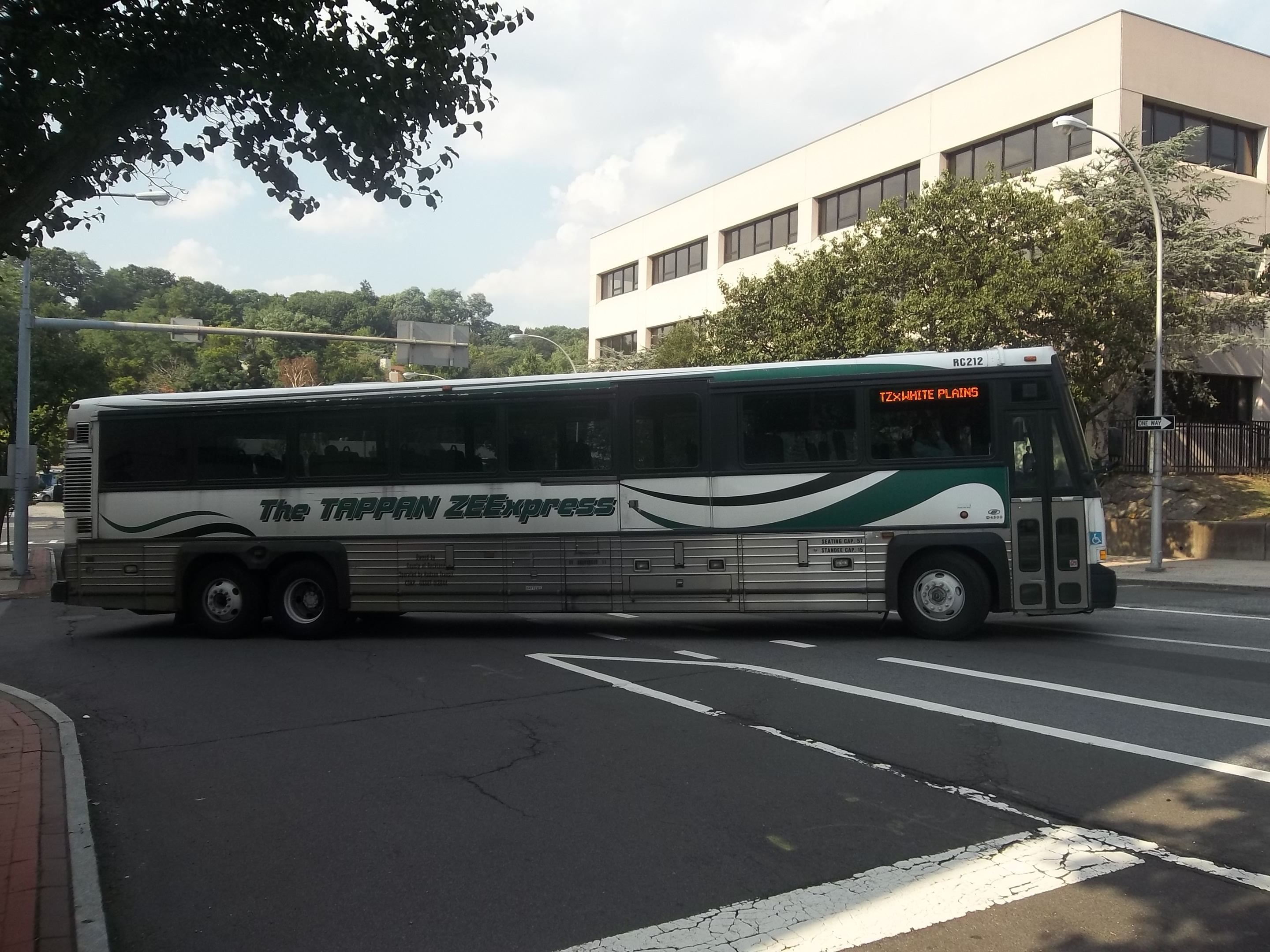
A Tappan Zee Express bus in 2012, the predecessor of the Hudson Link service

Bus services over the original Tappan Zee Bridge began operating when the bridge opened in 1955, including a subsidized commuter bus service that operated from 1963 to 1965. Suburban growth on both sides of the bridge contributed to traffic congestion, which became a major political issue in the 1970s. A series of studies by NYSDOT and the New York State Thruway Authority in the 1980s provided proposals for HOV lanes on the bridge, but those plans were cancelled by Governor George Pataki in 1997.

Transport of Rockland began service over the Tappan Zee Bridge in 1989, supported by funding from NYSDOT. The Tappan Zee Express service operated on weekdays from Spring Valley to White Plains, and served approximately 20,000 passengers per month in 1996. The service was revised in 2000, introducing a park and ride lot at the Palisades Center mall in West Nyack and adding Saturday service.

Plans for the construction of the new Tappan Zee Bridge included expanded public transit options, replacing the Tappan Zee Express service. A 2014 study supported by NYSDOT and the Thruway Authority argued that transit service over the new bridge should take the form of bus rapid transit. The study proposed an expanded bus route network, with local service on Route 59 in Rockland County and extensions to Westchester Medical Center, Port Chester, and The Bronx. The 2014 study also proposed additional BRT infrastructure to be built within 15 years of the bridge opening, including a new bus station at the Palisades Center.

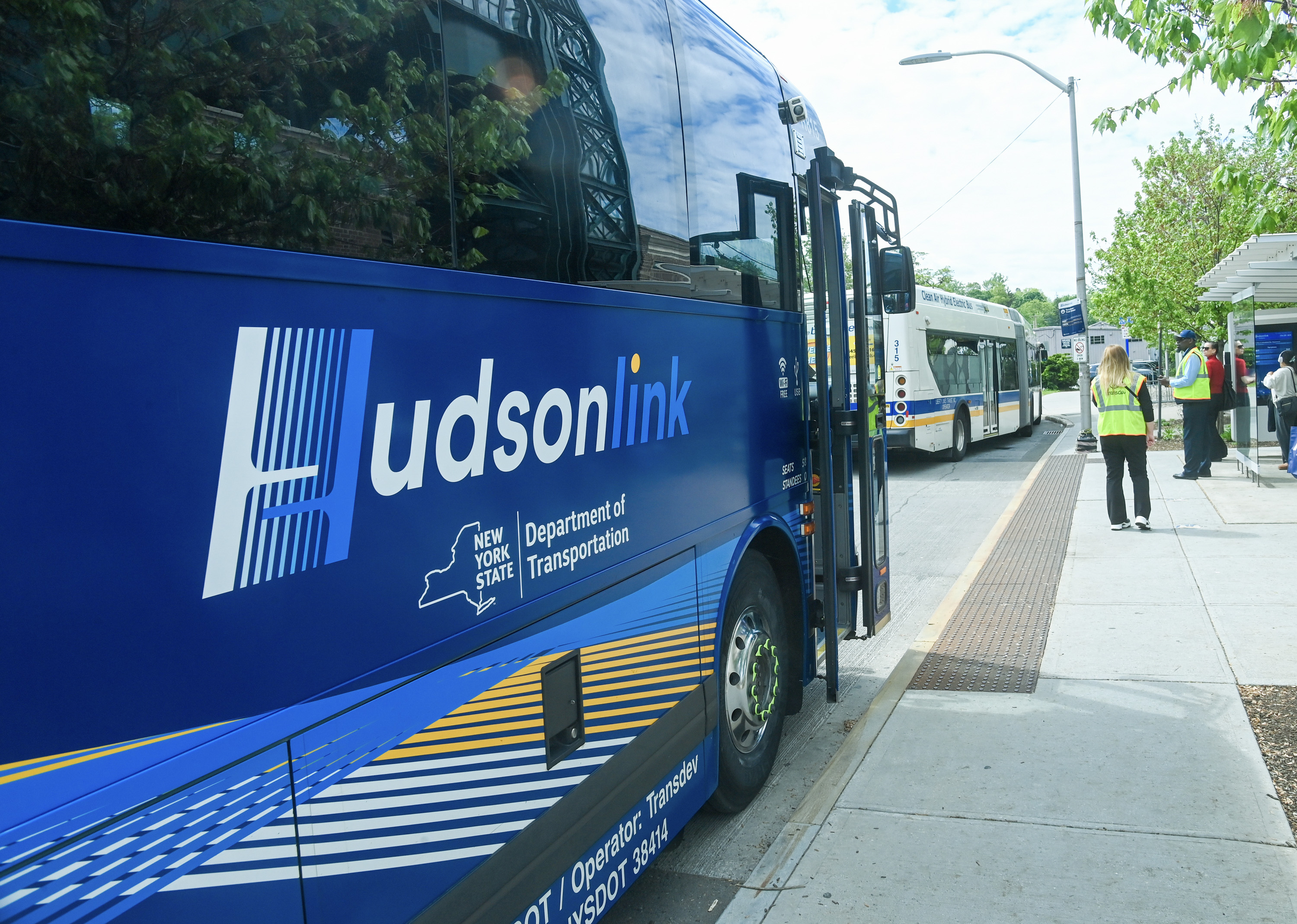
Hudson Link boarding platforms at Tarrytown station

The route network of the proposed bus service added more express services to White Plains, connecting with the Metro-North Harlem Line. Planners argued that trips from Rockland County to New York City would be faster via White Plains, despite that route's additional travel distance compared to trips via Tarrytown and the Hudson Line. Opposition from Rockland County political leaders and residents caused the service to be revised to offer more service to Tarrytown. The other proposed routes from the 2014 study have become future provisions of the network, which will be expanded on "as ridership warrants". There are some initiative to roll out the White Plains-Port Chester service (proposed Platinum route), but no implementation schedule is set for that, or the other future provisions.

The Hudson Link service was operated by Transdev, which replaced the Tappan Zee Express' operator Brega Transport. Service began in October 2018, and schedules were revised shortly after service began to add more trips to Tarrytown. Riders and political leaders criticized Transdev's management when service began, highlighting missed connections from Metro-North trains and overly strict policies for bus drivers.

In 2020, Hudson Link introduced a free shuttle service for users of the newly-completed bicycle and pedestrian path on the north side of the Tappan Zee Bridge. The shuttle service operates on weekends in the summer, serving stops at either end of the path. A Hudson Link bus was destroyed by fire on the bridge in November 2025, with no injuries.

On May 22, 2026, NYSDOT released a statement informing that Coach USA was awarded the contract to continue operating Hudson Link service. The transition from Transdev to Coach USA was finalized the weekend of June 27-28, 2026.

== Fares ==
The standard fare for Hudson Link services is $2.75. Reduced fares are available for senior citizens, individuals with disabilities, and students. A special discounted fare is available for travel within Tarrytown. Hudson Link offers discounted transfers to local buses operated by Bee-Line, Transport of Rockland, CT Transit, and Clarkstown Mini Trans.

== Bus fleet ==
The Hudson Link bus service has a fleet of 31 buses, which are exclusively Prevost X3-45 commuter coaches, numbered R801–R831. Each bus has free Wi-Fi and USB ports. Some buses are also equipped with bike racks. The color scheme represents the New York State colors, with the Hudson Link and NYSDOT logos on the sides and at the front of the bus. All buses are wheelchair accessible.

Fleet number(s)	Photo	Year	Manufacturer	Model	Engine	Transmission	Notes
R801–R831		2018	Prevost	X3-45	Volvo D13	Allison B500	Same mechanical specifications as the NYMTA units.; Equipped with overhead TV screens, wifi, USB charging outlets, and bike racks (capacity of 3); Capacity of 57 passengers

== List of routes ==
The Lower Hudson Transit Link operates several routes:

Route	Terminals			Streets Traveled	Notes
H01	Suffern; Hallett Place & Chestnut St	↔ AM ↔ PM	West Nyack; Palisades Center Commuter Lot J	NYS Route 59, Interstate 287	Operates daily in the morning and afternoon only.; Some runs combined with H07X runs to continue to Tarrytown.
H03	Monsey; Main Street & NYS Route 59	↔	White Plains; Broadway & Main Street	NYS Route 59, Interstate 287, Tappan Zee Bridge	Non-stop between Westchester County Center and Palisades Center Lot J.
H05	West Nyack; Palisades Center Commuter Lot J	↔	White Plains; Broadway & Main Street	NYS Route 59, Main Street, South Broadway Interstate 287, Tappan Zee Bridge	Non-stop between Westchester County Center and Nyack.
H07	West Nyack; Palisades Center Commuter Lot J	↔	Tarrytown; Metro North station	NYS Route 59, Main Street, South Broadway, Tappan Zee Bridge, Broadway	Some rush hour H07 runs continue to Spring Valley; H07X is rush hour only; Two H07X runs in each direction per day continue to Suffern; Two H07X runs in each direction per day continue to Spring Valley; Special $1.00 fare applicable for travel from Tarrytown station to Elizabeth Street; H07 makes no stops between Palisades Center and Tarrytown station
H07X	West Nyack; Palisades Center Commuter Lot J	→ AM ← PM	Tarrytown; Metro North station	NYS Route 59, Interstate 287, Tappan Zee Bridge, Broadway	Some rush hour H07 runs continue to Spring Valley; H07X is rush hour only; Two H07X runs in each direction per day continue to Suffern; Two H07X runs in each direction per day continue to Spring Valley; Special $1.00 fare applicable for travel from Tarrytown station to Elizabeth Street; H07 makes no stops between Palisades Center and Tarrytown station
SHTL	West Nyack; Palisades Center Commuter Lot J	↔	Tarrytown; Metro North station	NYS Route 59, Interstate 287, Tappan Zee Bridge	Weekend only service from May 8 to October 31; Geared towards bikers/hikers; Only stops between terminals are at Bridge landings on both sides
