= Guillermo Silva =

Guillermo Silva may refer to:

- Guillermo Silva Gundelach (born 1947), Chilean jurist, president of the Supreme Court in 2020–2022
- Guillermo Silva Santamaria (1921–2007), Colombian painter and printmaker
- Guillermo Thomas Silva (born 2001), Uruguayan cyclist
