= Ana Tiscornia =

Uruguayan artist (born 1951)

Ana Tiscornia is a visual artist from Montevideo, Uruguay, currently living and working in New York. She makes art in a wide array of media, including sculpture, painting, printmaking, photography, and installation. Common themes are her Uruguayan past and the country's history of dictatorships, the deconstruction of architectural elements, and questioning mankind's place in the urban environment.

== Personal life ==
Ana Tiscornia was born in Montevideo, Uruguay in 1951. She recalls that as a child she was influenced by an uncle who was an architect, and that she had an early childhood desire to grow up to be a construction worker. From 1971 to 1977, Tiscornia studied architecture at the Universidad de la República in Montevideo, where she specialized in technical drawings for plumbing systems. During the repressive political climate of the Military Dictatorships of 1973-85, Tiscornia sought connection with members of the Engraving Club at the Montevideo School of Engraving (Escuela Taller de Artes Plásticas Guillermo Fernánde) who were prevented by the government from political assembly. Within these officially sanctioned meeting places, Tiscornia was free to discuss her political ideas and develop her style in a repressive artistic climate. Her 2007 book, Vicissitudes of The Imaginary: Between Utopia and Fragmented Identity, describes her views on the artistic climate in Uruguay at this time. 1986 marked the beginning of Tiscornia gaining artistic recognition, winning prizes at the 2nd Biennial in Havana, Cuba, the 34th Municipal Salon in Montevideo, achieving first place for the Paul Cézanne Fellowship Award, and earning a scholarship to study at the Académie de Paris. Upon returning from Paris, having gained international attention, Tiscornia contemplated emigrating from Uruguay to New York City, which she did in 1991. In the diverse art world of New York, she established not only her Uruguayan identity, but also her identity within the larger Latin American arts community. Much of her work from this period, she says, reflects her growing sense of identity and what it meant to be stereotyped. Encountering professional difficulties in New York, as well as on the art market in Montevideo, Tiscornia turned to curating and teaching in 1996. Retired from both fields, she is Professor Emeritus at SUNY College at Old Westbury, and currently in New York City.

== Work ==
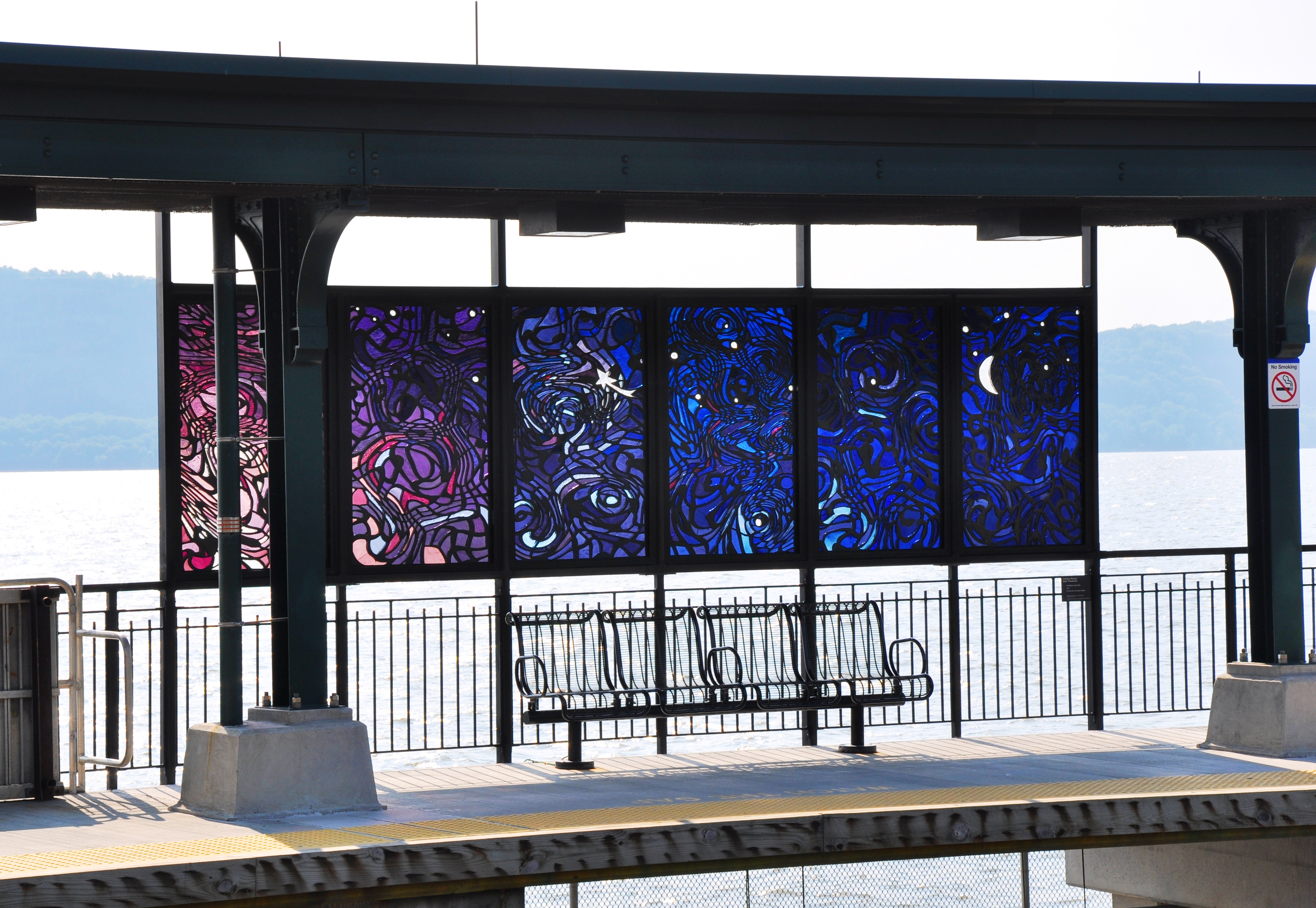
Untitled with Sky (six stained glass windows and twelve seats covered in mosaic tiles) by Liliana Porter and Ana Tiscornia using Willet Hauser Architectural Glass. At the Scarborough station in Briarcliff Manor, New York.

Ana Tiscornia works in a variety of media, including painting, sculpting, collage, photography, printmaking, and installation. Employing traditional materials and everyday objects, she explores Uruguay's complicated political history, emigration, urban spatiality, and identity.

After moving to New York in 1991, Tiscornia's work largely reflects her feelings toward Uruguay's political history under military dictatorships. Her work prior to leaving Uruguay was largely political and produced in collaboration with the Escuela Taller de Artes Plásticas. This mode of expression was continued in her earliest works after emigrating from her homeland. Her series, Portraits (sometimes referred to as Thirteen Portraits or Trece Retratos) from 1996, consisting of thirteen anonymous photo portraits printed to be near-transparent, has been read as focusing on the forced emigration of political refugees, including the artist's own self-imposed exile. Another examining of the series looks at it in the context of los desaparecidos (the disappeared) from the military dictatorship era and has been featured in a number of expositions dealing with this theme. Tiscornia returned to this theme with a second series in 2000 titled Portraits II/ Retratos II that features another series of thirteen photos, this time of the reverse side of antique photo-frames.

In 1996, Ana Tiscornia exhibited the first of two larger installation works, Camuflajes y olvidos at the [Museo Historico del Cabildo de Montevideo] in which Tiscornia juxtaposed negative space vinyl cutouts of a standing figure with meticulously placed domestic furnishing and household objects encapsulated by a box constructed of clear plastic. The work questions the homes left behind by people either abducted by the government or in exile abroad by highlighting the missing human element of the domestic interior. In the second installation, It Was the End of the Afternoon (1999), Tiscornia constructed a deteriorated room in the Smack Mellon Gallery (Brooklyn, New York). Filling odd cracks and displacements, she placed bits of text that referenced memory illnesses.

Starting in 2002, Tiscornia began a series of sculptural installation works that situated portions of chairs against walls and floors in such a way that they appear to be half submerged in the fabric of their physical surroundings. This effect of emerging objects appears in a number of her works in the mid-2000s, and includes a series in which she places matte-black hammers as an installation on the wall.

While the abstraction of physical space can be seen in a digital photo series from 2002, in 2007 Tiscornia's work looked to her architectural education by deconstructing the expectations of physical space. In House Project from 2007, she re-assembled cut pieces of a simple wooden model of a house at different angles. This artistic method is repeated again in works such as Situation (2008), For the Time Being (2010), and Untitled with Brick Wall (2012), as well as others, each time further abstracting the concept of physical space. In 2010, Tiscornia began exploring this idea in other media, Black Spots (2010), Red Grid (2011) and others, use cutouts of architectural drawings in order to assemble a collage, rendering the scenes chaotic, but with an underlying geometrical order. In 2011–12 she worked on a series of acrylic paintings that recreated this abstraction and deconstruction of form.

Tiscornia's concern with physical space continues to be explored in other mediums. Starting in 2011, she began using cardboard cutouts of architectural models for her collage work, embracing the three-dimensionality of the medium. Works such as The Project (2011) and Fact of the Matter II (2011) appear to spill off the collage and content with the viewer's physical space, bridging the gap between collage and sculpture.

She won the Mercosur Konex Award from Argentina in 2022.

== Publications ==
Ana Tiscornia has written one book, Vicissitudes of the Visual Imaginary: Between utopia and fragmented identity (White Wine Press, a division of Smart Art Press, Santa Monica, CA. 2007. ISBN 978-84-934236-1-2), and has published a large number of papers on the art of Latin America and Uruguay. She currently works as Art Editor for Point of Contact Gallery's The Journal of Verbal and Visual Arts (distributed by Syracuse University Press).
