= Margo Taft Stever =

American poet

Margo Taft Stever is an American poet, whose poetry collections include The End of Horses (Broadstone Books, 2020), winner of the Pinnacle Achievement Award in Poetry, 2022; Cracked Piano (CavanKerry Press, 2019); Ghost Moose (Kattywompus Press, 2019); The Lunatic Ball (Kattywompus Press, 2015); The Hudson Line (Main Street Rag, 2012); Frozen Spring (Mid-List Press First Series Award, 2002) and Reading the Night Sky (Riverstone Press Poetry Chapbook Competition, 1996).

== Biography ==
Stever is a graduate of Harvard University, and is a recipient of an Ed.M from the Harvard Graduate School of Education, and an M.F.A. in Poetry from Sarah Lawrence College.

Stever co-authored the book Looking East: William Howard Taft and the 1905 U.S. Diplomatic Mission to China (Zhejiang University Press, 2012).

Her poems, essays, and reviews have appeared widely in magazines and anthologies, including Verse Daily; Prairie Schooner; Connecticut Review; “poem-a-day” on poets.org, Academy of American Poets; Cincinnati Review; upstreet; Plume; and Salamander.

She is founder of the Hudson Valley Writers Center and founding and current co-editor of Slapering Hol Press. She lives in Sleepy Hollow, New York.
