= Liliana Porter =

Argentine artist (born 1941)

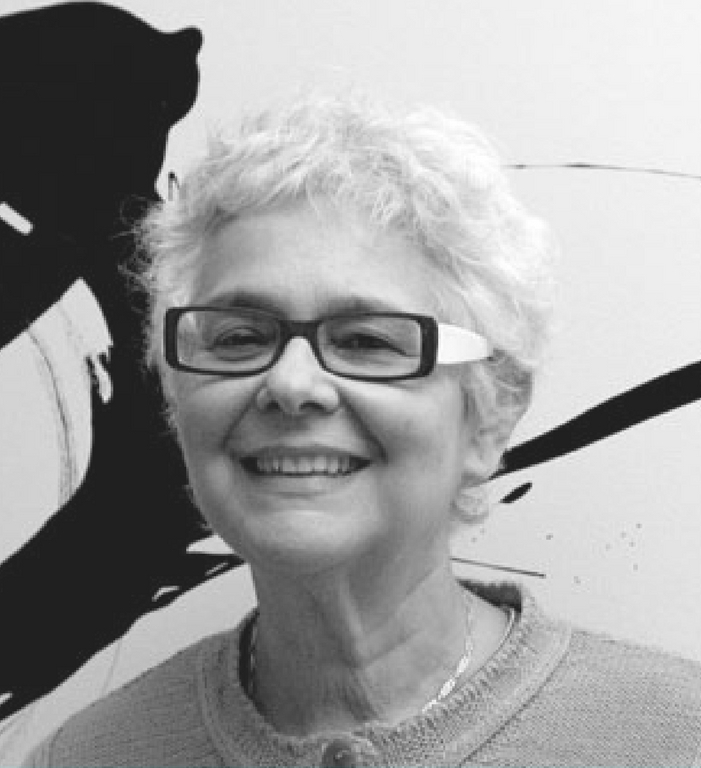
- Born: 1941 (age 84–85); Buenos Aires, Argentina
- Education: Escuela Nacional de Bellas Artes
- Known for: Photography; Printmaking; Mixed media Installation art Video art
- Website: lilianaporter.com

Liliana Porter (born 1941) is an Argentine contemporary artist working in a wide variety of media, including photography, printmaking, painting, drawing, installation, video, theater, and public art.

== Education and teaching experience ==
Porter was born in Buenos Aires, Argentina in 1941, lives and works in New York. As a teenager, she attended the Universidad Iberoamericana in Mexico City, Mexico, where she studied under Guillermo Silva Santamaria and Mathias Goeritz. She returned to Argentina and completed her training at the Escuela Nacional de Bellas Artes in Buenos Aires. In 1964, she moved to New York City, where she co-founded the New York Graphic Workshop with fellow artists Luis Camnitzer and José Guillermo Castillo. In 1974 she was a co-founder and etching instructor at Studio Camnitzer, an artist's residence studio near Lucca, Italy that welcomes artists working in all media. After holding teaching positions at the Porter-Wiener Studio, the Printmaking Workshop, SUNY Purchase and State University of New York at Old Westbury, Porter became a professor at Queens College, City University of New York in 1991 and remained there until 2007.

== Artwork ==
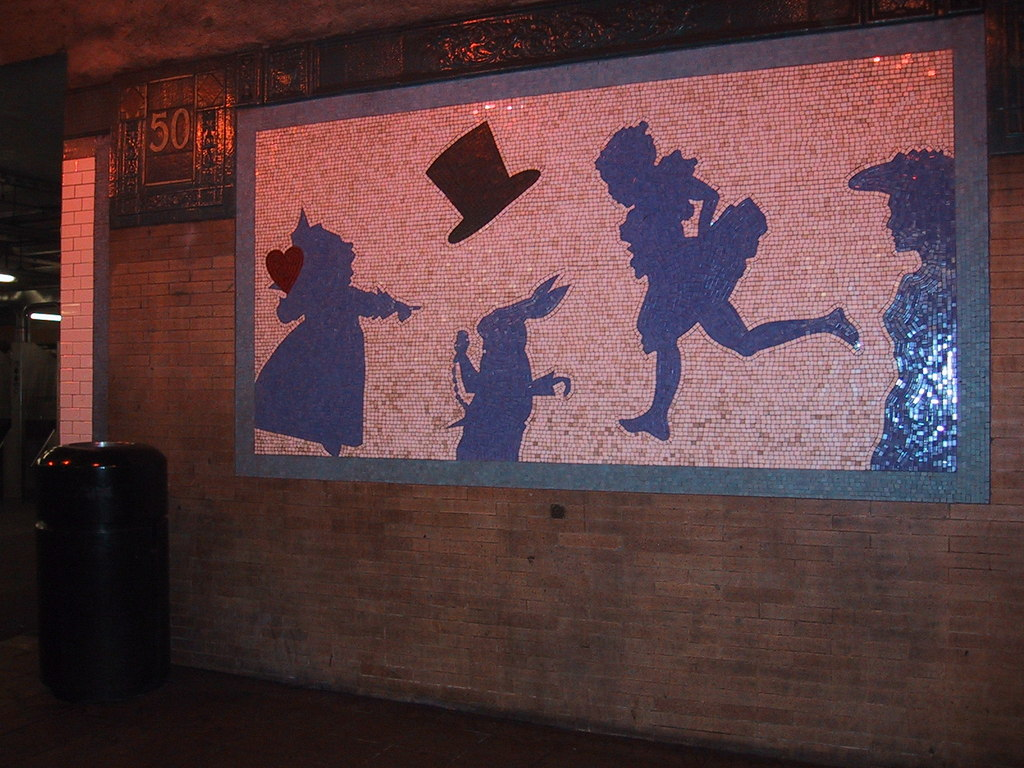
50th Street (IRT Broadway–Seventh Avenue Line)

Porter's work often focuses on themes of simulacrum, mass reproduction, entropy, and boundaries between image and reality. She cites Luis Felipe Noe, Giorgio Morandi, Roy Lichtenstein, the Arte Povera group, and the Guerrilla Girls as influences on her work. She has exhibited internationally, and currently lives and works in New York.

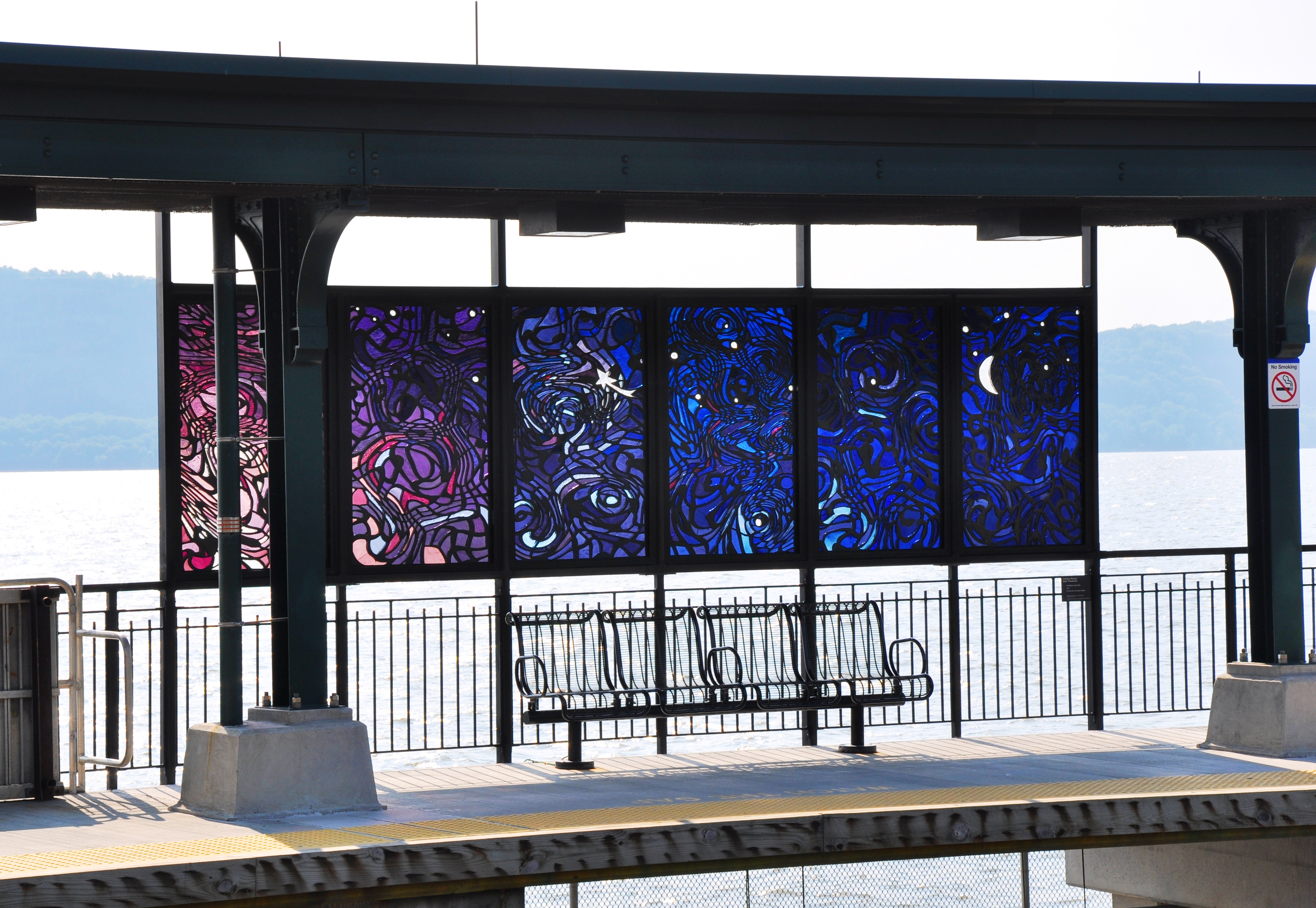
Scarborough Train Station (2)

She has twice created work for the MTA of New York City's Arts for Transit and Urban Design program—a program dedicated to creating public art for New York City Subway stations. In 1994, Porter created the mosaic series Alice: The Way Out, featuring imagery inspired by Lewis Carroll's Alice in Wonderland for the 50th Street subway station. In 2012, she collaborated with Uruguayan artist Anna Tiscornia to create Untitled With Sky, a glass windscreen and glass mosaic seating for the Scarborough station. Porter and Tiscornia are continuing their collaboration and will exhibit their new work in January 2013 at the Galería del Paseo in Montevideo, Uruguay.

In 2018, the Pérez Art Museum Miami, presented a major solo project by Porter. The site specific installation El hombre con el hacha y otras situaciones breves (2014/2017) comprised nearly one hundred individual sculptural pieces and fragments relating the artist's signature language, themes, and characters including elements first presented in Liliana Porter's 2017 Venice Biennale project for the Argentina pavilion.

== Permanent collections ==
Porter's work has been featured in the collections of the Museum of Contemporary Art San Diego, Museum of Modern Art New York, TATE Modern (London), Whitney Museum of American Art, Museo Tamayo (Mexico), Museo Nacional de Bellas Artes (Buenos Aires), The Metropolitan Museum of Art (New York), Boston Museum of Fine Art, Smithsonian Institution (Washington D.C.), Pérez Art Museum Miami, Museo de Bellas Artes (Santiago, Chile), El Museo del Barrio (New York), Museo de Arte Moderno de Bogotá, (Bogotá, Colombia) and more.

== Awards ==
- Guggenheim Fellowship (1980)
- The New York Foundation for the Arts Fellowship (1985, 1996, 1999)
- NEA Mid-Atlantic Regional Fellowship (1994)
- Professional Staff Congress-CUNY Research Award (awarded seven times between 1994 and 2004)
- Platinum Konex Award in Mixed Technics (2002), Konex Foundation
- Merit Diploma Konex Award (1992 and 2012), Konex Foundation

== Publications ==
- Gainza, Maria (March 2004). "Liliana Porter: Centro Cultural Recoleta". Artforum. p. 190. Archived from the original on 12 July 2011.
- Sorkin, Jenni (4 April 2002). "Liliana Porter, Annina Nosei Gallery, New York". frieze 66. Archived from the original on 24 October 2012.
- Bazzano-Nelson, Florencia (2008). Liliana Porter and the Art of Simulation. Ashgate Publishing. Archived from the original on 22 September 2015.
