= Hudson Valley Writers Center =

Non-Profit Writers Center in Philipsburg Manor, Sleepy Hollow, New York

Coordinates: 41°05′41″N 73°52′10″W

The Exterior of the Hudson Valley Writers Center, also the Philipse Manor Station House

The Hudson Valley Writer Center is a non-profit literary arts organization in the Philipse Manor neighborhood of Sleepy Hollow, New York. It was established on August 5, 1988, by Margo Taft Stever, a Sleepy Hollow poet, with the assistance of the Westchester Council of Arts, and moved into its permanent home at the Philipse Manor Railroad Station in 1996. The center hosts over 40 readings/workshops with poets, fiction and non-fiction authors, and playwrights over the course of a year, as well as popular recurring monthly events like Open Mic, Open Write and Submission Sunday. They also publish chapbooks annually under its imprint, Slapering Hol Press.

== History ==
The Philipse Manor Railroad Station House was built c. 1910 in the Tudor Revival style. The station continued to be in use until 1983 with the Metro-North's acquisition of the adjacent railroad. The station house fell into disarray due to its abandonment.

In 1983, with a grant from the Westchester Art Council (now ArtsWestchester), Margo Taft Stever created the forebear of the Hudson Valley Writers Center, the Sleepy Hollow Poetry Series (SHPS), through a series of readings at the Warner Library in Tarrytown.

To deal with financial realities, a nonprofit organization, the Hudson Valley Writers Center, was formed on June 28, 1988. The board of directors included Donald Stever, Nicholas Robinson, and Patricia Farewell. The board took it upon themselves to obtain the abandoned Philipse Manor Railroad Station as a home for the writing center.

In 1990, Stever founded Slapering Hol, (Old Dutch for Sleepy Hollow), dedicating the press to emerging poets. The first chapbook, Voices from the River, gets published in 1990. The press also brought many poets to the center for readings, such as Denise Levertov, Billy Collins, Donald Hall, Galway Kinnell, and Rita Dove. Slapering Hol only publishes poets who have not published a book or poets who have won the press's yearly chapbook contest.

The Intermodal Surface Transportation Efficiency Act of 1991 allocated $306,700 to repair and restore the Philpse Manor Station House. Also in 1991, the Philipse Manor Railroad Station got placed on the National and State Registers of Historic Places for being architecturally and historically significant as a highly intact example of a Tudor Revival style suburban commuter railroad station. The Philipse Manor Railroad Station is still an operating station serving Sleepy Hollow.

In 1993 the Hudson Valley Writers Center received the Westchester Arts Council Arts Award for Best Arts Organization.

The interior of the Hudson Valley Writers Center

The restoration of the Philipse Manor Station House involved things like reconstruction of the stone arches and porte-cochere's, stabilization of the foundation walls, and restoration of the interior millwork which began in 1995. A literacy project at the Coachman Family Center, a transitional shelter where Westchester County houses homeless families, gets established by the Hudson Valley Writers Center.

In 1996, the Hudson Valley Writers Center celebrated the opening of its renovated railroad station with a reading by Billy Collins.

In 2008 Slapering Hol Press publishes Poems in Conversation and a Conversation, by Elizabeth Alexander and Lyrae Van Clief-Stefanon. Also in 2008, The Writers Center receives The Westchester Arts Council 2008 Arts Organization of the Year, the 2008 Junior League of Westchester-on-Hudson's President's Award for Community Work, and the Westchester Magazine’s 2008 Best of Westchester Editors’ Pick for “Source for Literary Inspiration.

To celebrate the quadricentennial of the Hudson River's exploration, the Hudson Valley Writers Center publishes Hudson River Haiku by Helen Barolini.

In association with the African Poetry Book Fund/Prairie Schooner, The Poetry Foundation, and the University of Nebraska, Slapering Hol Press launched the inaugural chapbook box set for the African Poetry Chapbook Series. HVWC and SHP got featured at multiple AWP panels in Seattle.

In 2019, Hudson Valley Writers Center helped to plan and coordinate the First Annual Sleepy Hollow Literary Festival.

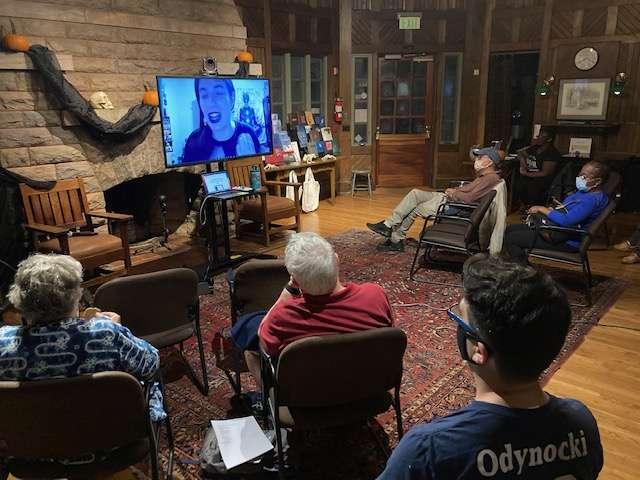
Hybrid Open Mic at the Hudson Valley Writers Center

=== COVID-19 Response ===
In response to the COVID-19 pandemic, all events, including reading and programming, went virtual. These events continued while adhering to new safety guidelines to protect the community's health. Zoom recordings of these past events are available on the Hudson Valley Writers Center YouTube page.

In September 2021, the Writers Center offered hybrid programming.

Starting in 2022, the Writers Center offers programming in three formats: virtual, in-person, and hybrid.

In 2023, the Writers Center celebrated 35 years of operations

== Events ==
=== Regular Events ===
Once a month, they host three events, an Open Mic, an Open Write, and Submission Sunday. Open Mic is every 3rd Friday of the month at 7:30 pm, allowing people to share their work with an audience. Open Write is every 2nd Saturday of the month also at 7:30 pm. Here, there are free writing prompts that people complete during the evening. Submission Sunday is a new, members-only event that allows writers across multiple genres to provide morale, material, and technical support to one another as they publish their work.

=== Special Events ===
The Hudson Valley Writers Center hosts readings where guest authors come in and read sections of their work. Additionally, there is an annual benefit gala, the biggest fundraiser of the year.

==== Notable Guest Author/Poet Readers ====
Julia Alvarez, author of How the Garcia Girls Lost Their Accents and In the Time of the Butterflies

John Ashbery, Pulitzer Prize winner

Anne Carson, poet, translator, and essayist, author of Autobiography of Red: a Novel in Verse

Chen Chen, winner of the A. Poulin Jr. Poetry Prize

Billy Collins, author of The Art of Drowning and Questions About Angels

Junot Díaz, former Pulitzer Prize chair and author of The Brief Wondrous Life of Oscar Wao

Denise Duhamel, author of Blowout

Jennifer Egan, Pulitzer Prize winner

Karen Finley, performance artist and poet, author of City Lights: Shock Treatment: Expanded 25th Anniversary Edition

Louise Gluck, former US Poet Laureate

Donald Hall, author of Without

Katherine Holabird, author of Angelina Ballerina

Philip Levine, former U.S. Poet Laureate

Frank McCourt, author of Angela’s Ashes and ‘Tis

Rick Moody, author of Garden State and The Ice Storm

Toni Morrison, author of Beloved, Song of Solomon, and The Bluest Eye

Pamela Paul, New York Times Book Review Editor

Seamus Scanlon, Irish playwright

Sara Shepard, author of Pretty Little Liars

Sharon Olds, Pulitzer Prize winner

Jacqueline Woodson, Newbery Honor winner, author of Brown Girl Dreaming

=== Courses ===
The Hudson Valley Writers Center offers a wide variety of courses ranging from Memoir Writing for Adults, Essay Writing, Screenplay, Fiction Workshops, How to Publish Your Work, and Poetry Workshops. The courses can run up to seven weeks, but the center also includes intensive classes and workshops.

==== Scholarships ====
The Writers Center offers four scholarship opportunities for intensives and writing workshops. The Altman Writers of Color Scholarship, The Need-Based Scholarship, The Karen Finley Need-Based Scholarship for Women and Non-Binary Writers, and The Limp Wrist LGBTQIA+ Scholarship. Scholarship applications and awards occur four times a year.

== Community Outreach ==
Since the origin of the Hudson Valley Writers Center, some writers have engaged in outreach work in underserved communities. The board of directors and affiliated writers in the community created a group that travels to nursing homes, residential homes for at-risk children, battered women's shelters, and homeless shelters to present one-day writing workshops. The center established a workshop at ARCS (Aids-Related Community Services). Additionally, the center created another long-term workshop at the Clear View School in Scarborough.

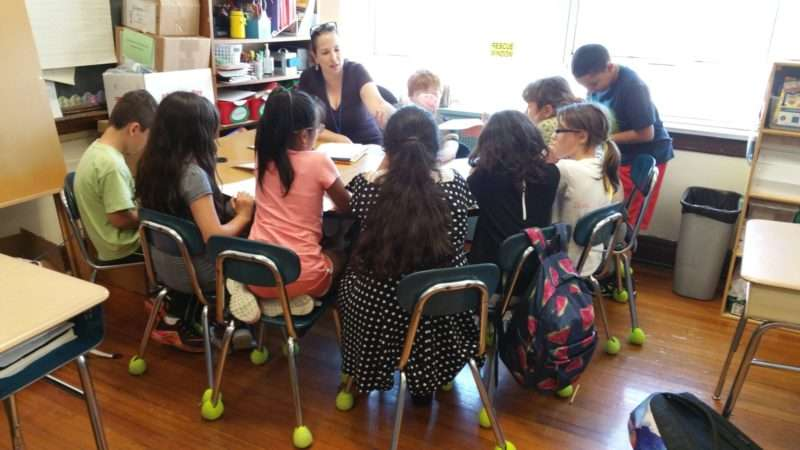
Children's Workshop

At the largest family homeless shelter in Westchester County, the Coachman Family Center, Margo Stever created the Comprehensive Literacy Program (CLP), which continued for over a decade. The program consisted of after-school homework help, writing and special art workshops, and a computer lab created by the center's outreach teachers.

In 2017, the Writers Center added to its outreach program with writing workshops at RSHM Life Center in Sleepy Hollow and the creation of workshops at Nepperhan Community Center in Yonkers and at Children's Village in Dobbs Ferry. They continue to run programming at LIFE and Children's Village.

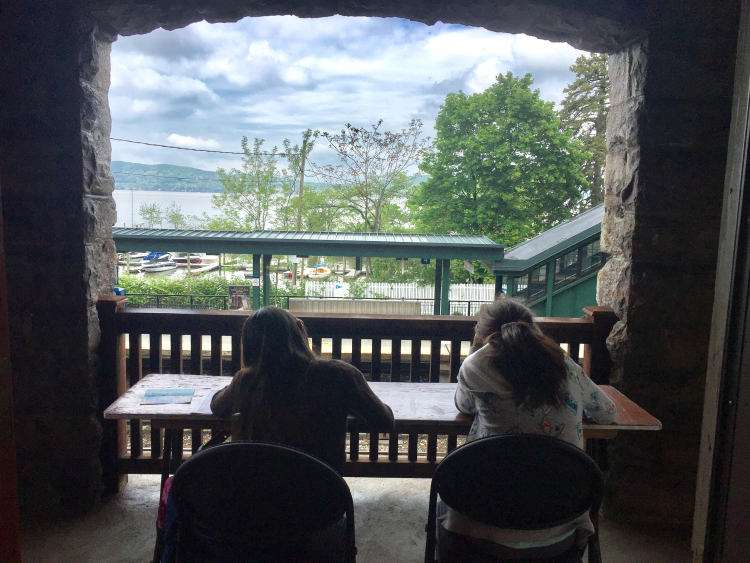
Children Writing at the Hudson Valley Writers Center

The Center realizes that the overwhelming influence of the internet, television, and other media make so many young people not get the benefit of literary work and are not learning the art of self-expression through creative writing. HVWC's past programs have included educational components for underserved children and people with special needs. The Board and Staff are committed to expanding this initiative. HVWC outreach volunteers are discussing with the Sing Sing Correctional Facility and other underserved communities to develop opportunities for teaching writing workshops within those venues.

The HVWC is working to buy, restore and modernize its historic building. In doing so, they launched the Foundation for the Future capital campaign, hoping to secure its legacy as a place to bring writers together.
