= Ossining station =

Metro-North Railroad station in New York

Ossining
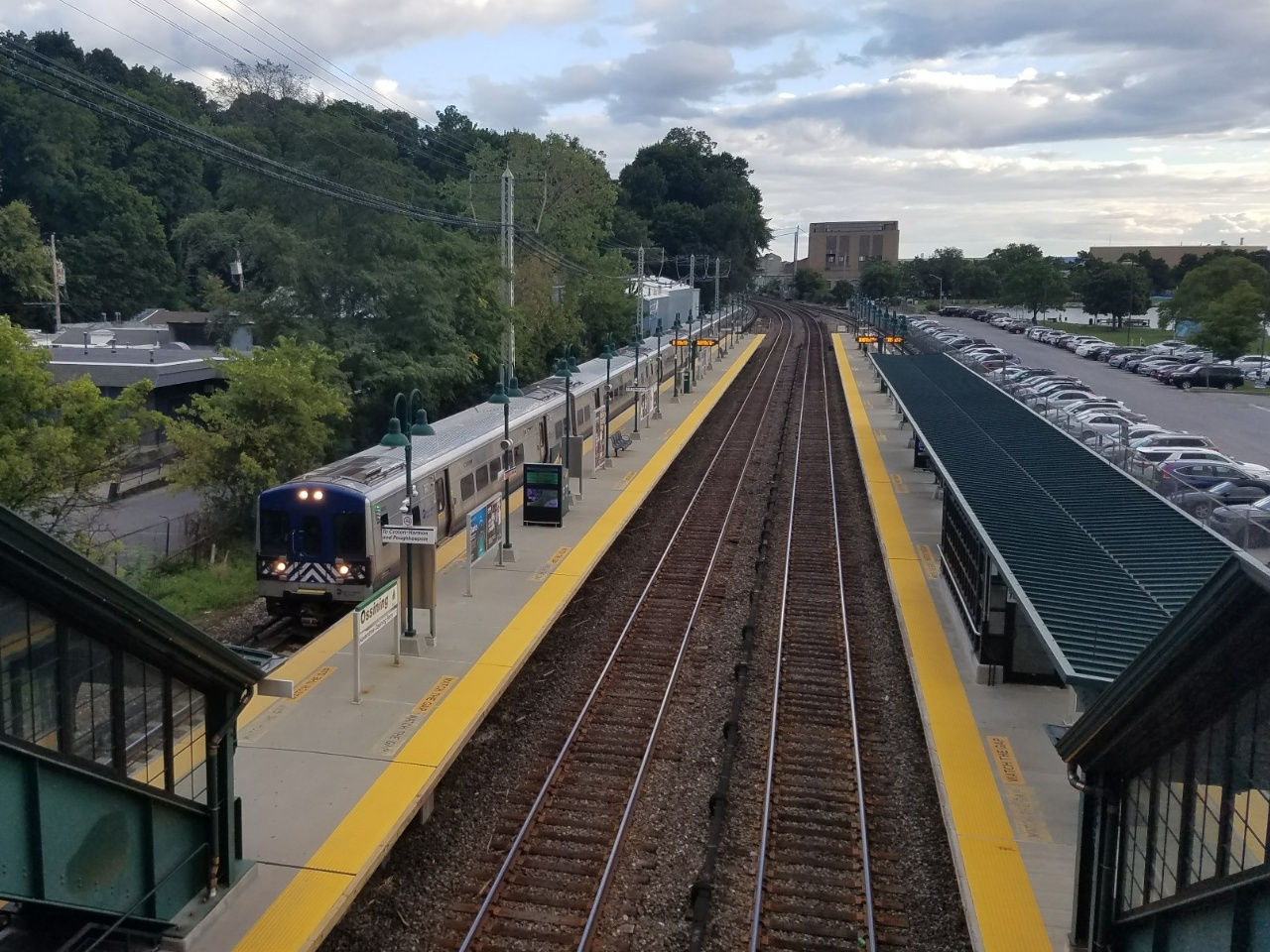
- Ossining station in September 2022

General information
- Location: 1 Main Street; Ossining, New York
- Coordinates: 41°09′27″N 73°52′09″W
- Line: Hudson Line
- Platforms: 2 island platforms
- Tracks: 4
- Connections: Bee-Line Bus System: 13, 19; NY Waterway: Haverstraw–Ossining Ferry

Construction
- Accessible: yes

Other information
- Fare zone: 5

History
- Opened: September 29, 1849
- Rebuilt: 1914
- Former names: Sing-Sing

Passengers
- 2018: 1,656 (Metro-North)
- Rank: 38 of 109

Services
Preceding station	Metro-North Railroad	Following station
Croton–Harmon Terminus	Hudson Line	Scarborough toward Grand Central
Croton–Harmon toward Poughkeepsie	Hudson Line	Tarrytown toward Grand Central
Former services
Preceding station	New York Central Railroad	Following station
Harmon toward Chicago	Main Line	Tarrytown toward New York
Harmon toward Peekskill	Hudson Division	Scarborough toward New York
Location

Ossining station is a commuter rail station on the Metro-North Railroad Hudson Line, located in Ossining, New York. Near the station is a ferry dock which is used by the NY Waterway-operated Haverstraw–Ossining Ferry. The station has two high-level island platforms, each 10 cars long, serving the line's four tracks.

== History ==
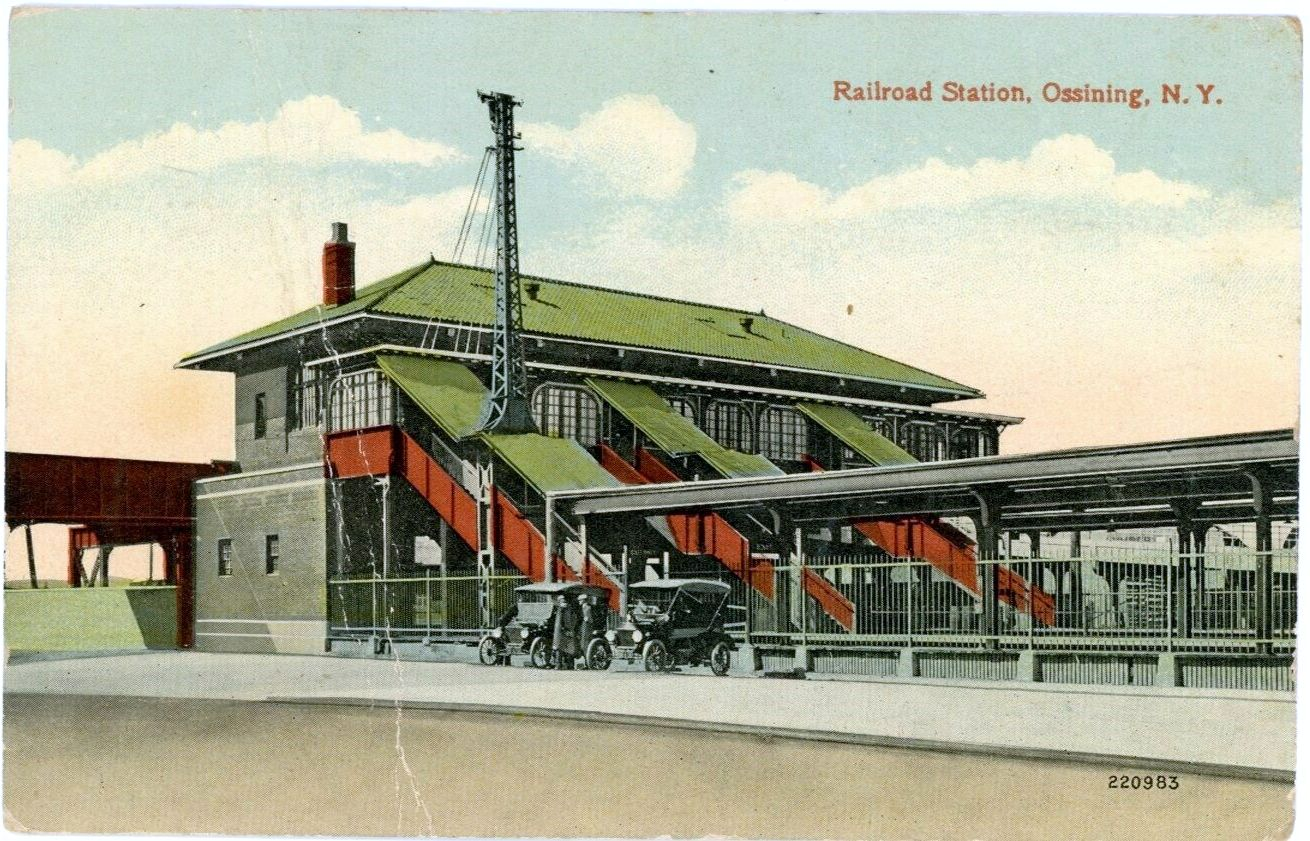
The station building in the early 20th century

The Hudson River Railroad reached Ossining on September 29, 1849, opening the village up to industrial development along the waterfront and allowing farmers inland to ship their produce to the markets of New York City. Among the riverside industrial concerns benefiting from the railroad were the marble quarries at Sing Sing Prison, Benjamin Brandreth's pill factory (still extant a short distance up the river) and others. These businesses gradually supplanted the boat builders and docks that had occupied the riverfront in the early 19th century.

Originally the station building was at grade level. In 1914 the New York Central Railroad, which the Hudson River had long been merged into, built a new station, the current building, in the Renaissance Revival style. It was placed on metal stilts to allow Main Street to pass over the tracks, eliminating the grade crossing that had been part of the original station. Like the rest of the Hudson Line, the station became a Penn Central station once the NYC & Pennsylvania Railroads merged in 1968. Penn Central's continuous financial despair throughout the 1970s forced them to turn over their commuter service to the Metropolitan Transportation Authority. The station and the railroad were turned over to Conrail in 1976, and eventually became part of the MTA's Metro-North Railroad in 1983. In 2000, New York Waterways used the station as the eastern port for the Haverstraw–Ossining Pedestrian Ferry creating a link between the station and Central Rockland County.
