= Tarrytown station =

Metro-North Railroad station in New York

Tarrytown
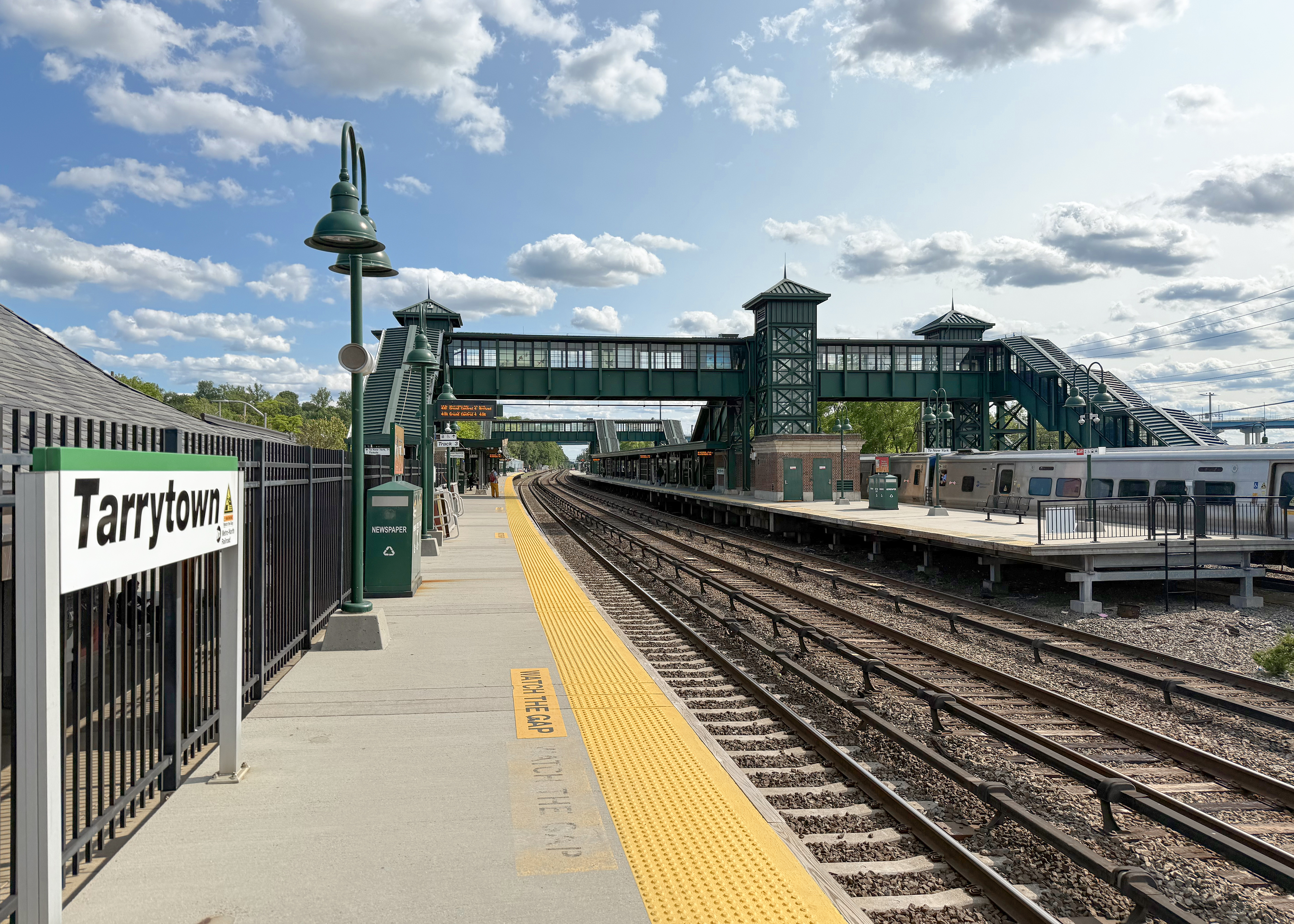
- Tarrytown station in 2025

General information
- Location: 1 Depot Plaza; Tarrytown, New York
- Coordinates: 41.0755°N 73.8656°W
- Line: Hudson Line
- Platforms: 1 island platform 1 side platform
- Tracks: 4
- Connections: Bee-Line Bus System: 1T, 13; Lower Hudson Transit Link: H03, H07, H07X

Construction
- Parking: 909 spaces
- Accessible: yes

Other information
- Fare zone: 5

History
- Opened: September 29, 1849
- Rebuilt: 1890, 1925, 2009–12

Passengers
- 2018: 3,263 (Metro-North)
- Rank: 13 of 109

Services
Preceding station	Metro-North Railroad	Following station
Philipse Manor toward Croton–Harmon	Hudson Line	Irvington toward Grand Central
Ossining toward Poughkeepsie	Hudson Line	Harlem–125th Street toward Grand Central
Former services
Preceding station	New York Central Railroad	Following station
Ossining toward Chicago	Main Line	Yonkers toward New York
Philipse Manor toward Peekskill	Hudson Division	Irvington toward New York
Location

Tarrytown station is a commuter rail stop on the Metro-North Railroad's Hudson Line, located in Tarrytown, New York. The Tappan Zee Bridge is not far from the station, resulting in its use by Rockland County commuters.

The station has two slightly offset high-level platforms, each able to accommodate 10 cars. An island platform is located between the western tracks of the four-track line, while a side platform serves the easternmost track.

== History ==
The land supporting the Tarrytown railroad station and its immediate surroundings were built on land reclaimed from the river and marshland in the 1840s during the construction of the Hudson River Railroad. The station opened on September 29, 1849, when the Hudson River Railroad opened between New York City and near Peekskill. An 1890-built station building, which also served as the terminus of John D. Rockefeller's private telegraph wire to his home in Pocantico Hills, was destroyed in a fire caused by a cigarette in April 1922. Plans for a new station were completed three years later in October 1925.

Almost 120 years after the station first went into use, an announcement was made in November 2007 concerning a large scale refurbishment of the station as part of the second phase of MTA's Capital Program. The renovated building was to include a ticket agent and waiting area, new heated overpasses, stairways and elevators as well as new platforms. Metro-North set aside $3.5 million for the project with the expectation that design work would be completed by the second quarter of 2008. Work at the Tarrytown station began in October 2009 and was completed, under budget and on schedule in 2012.

In March 2020, a bakery named The Bakehouse of Tarrytown opened inside the former station building.

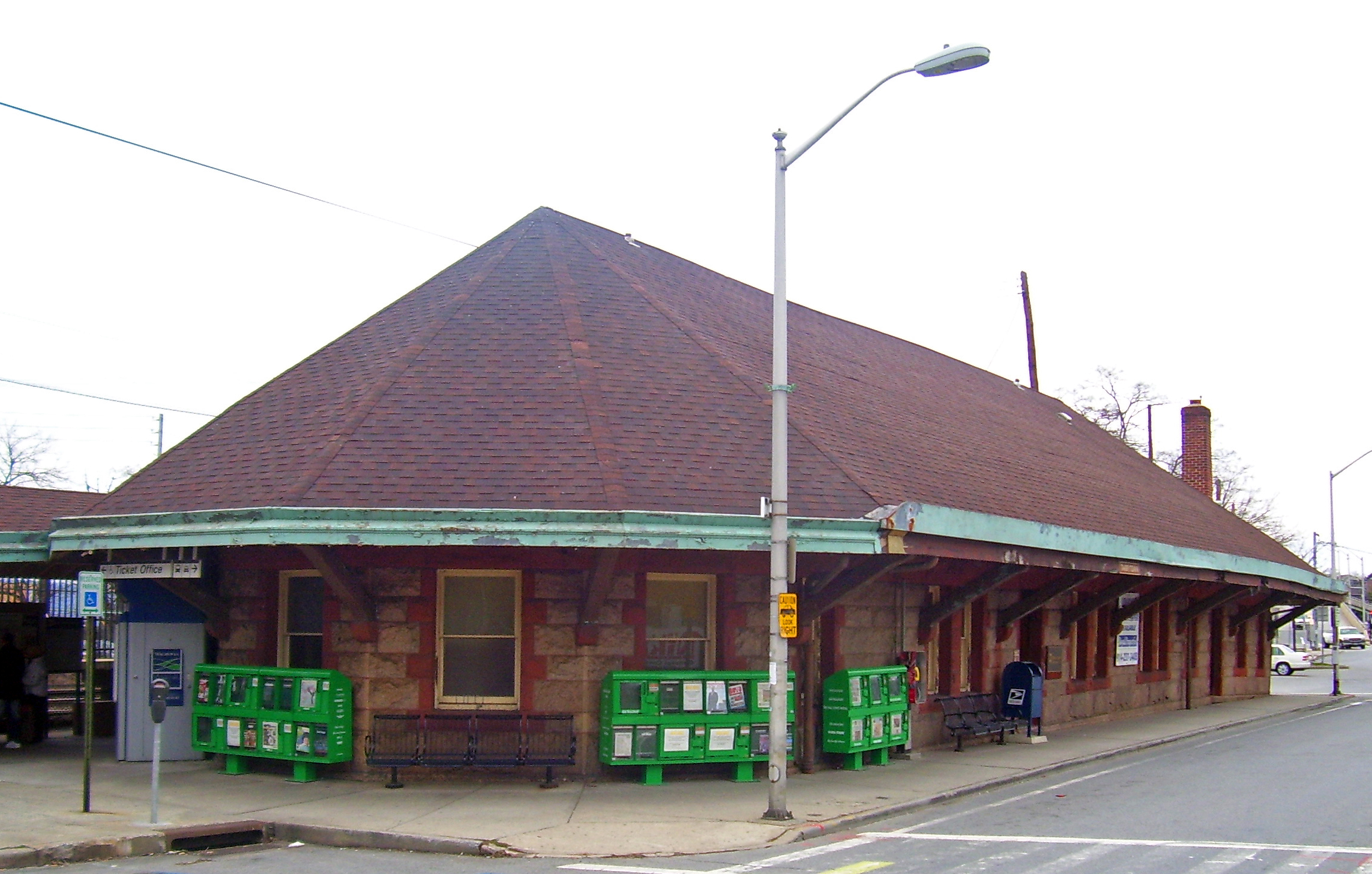
The 1925-built station building

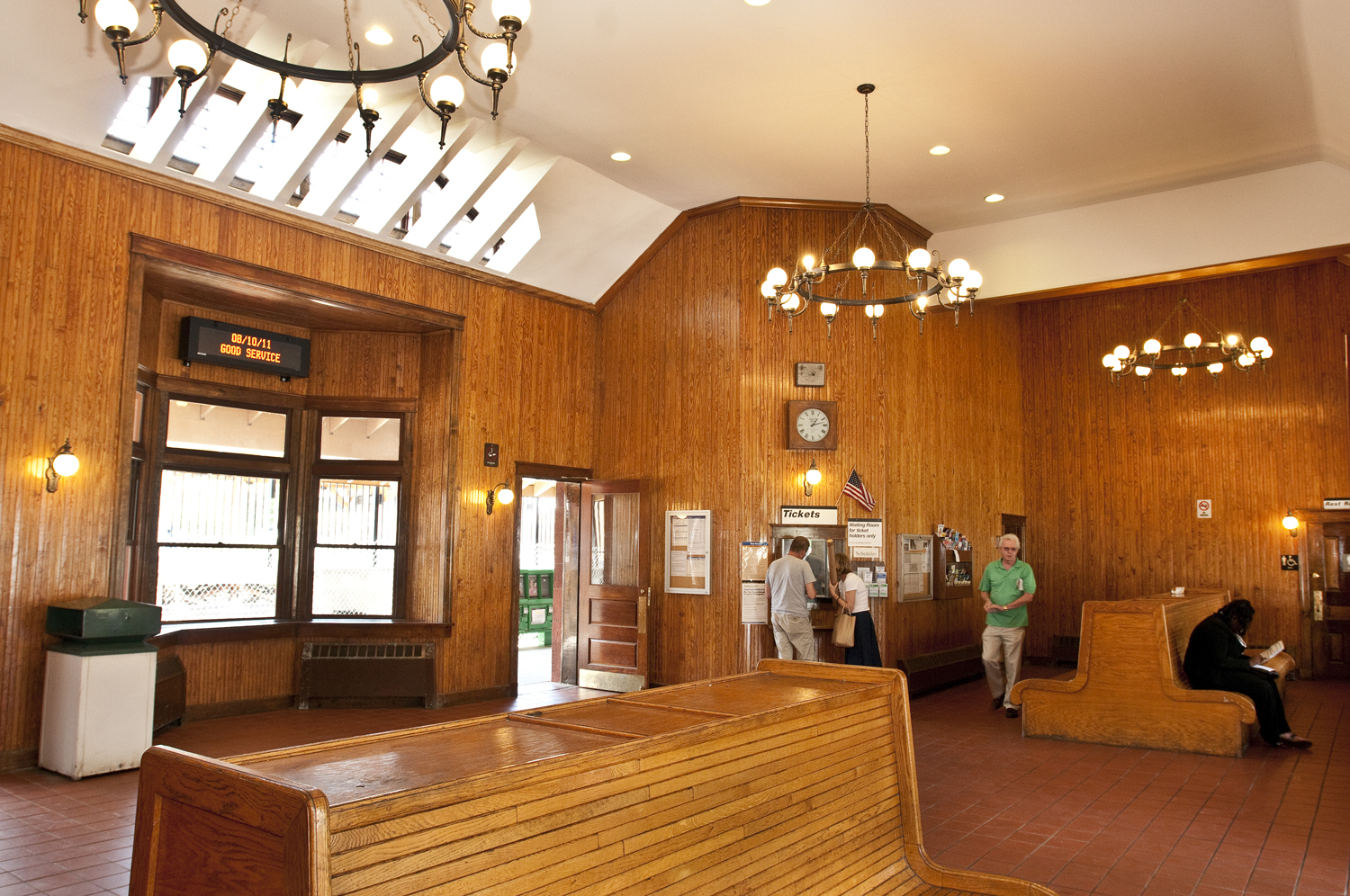
The waiting room and ticket office

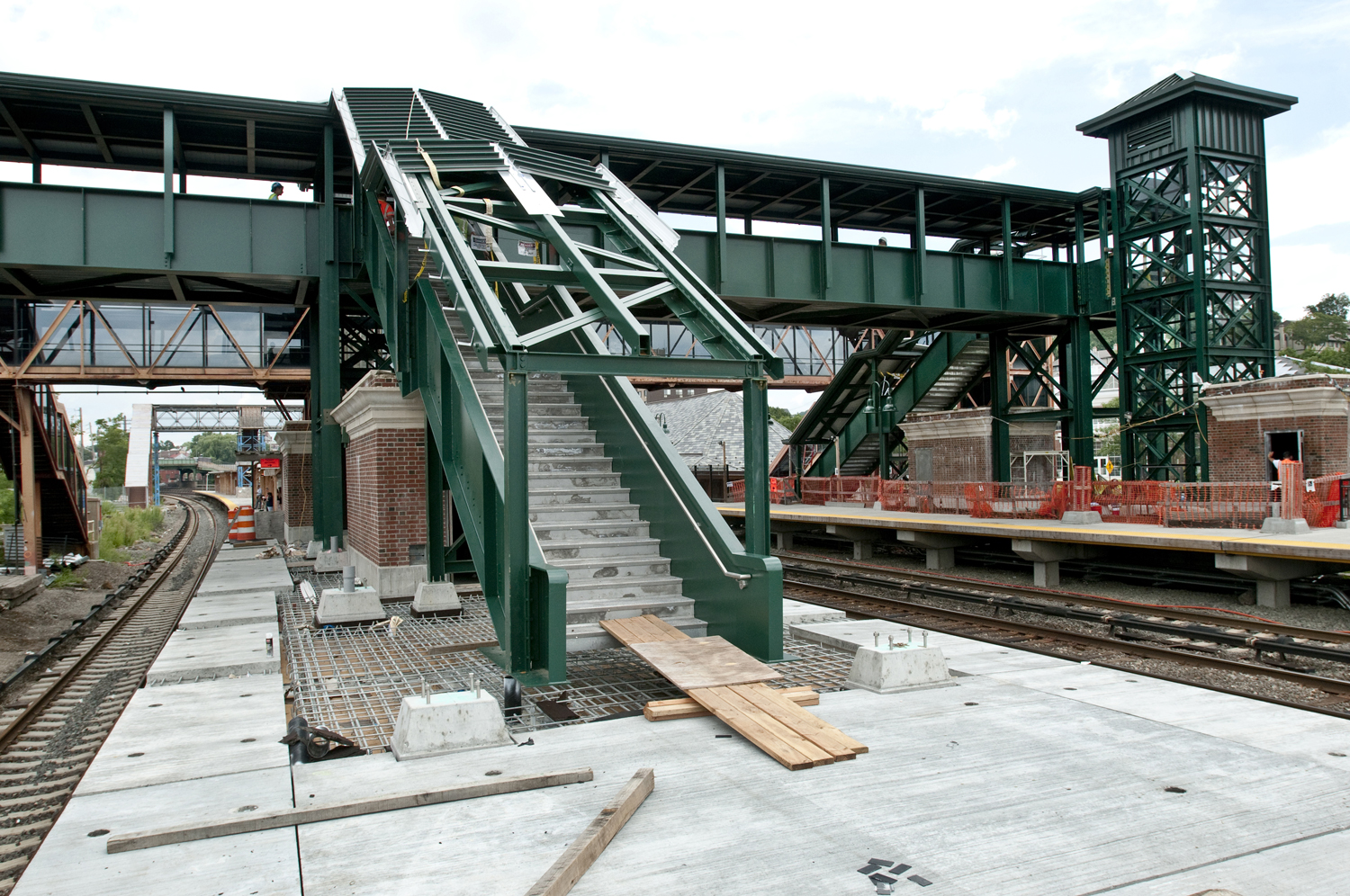
Reconstruction work in 2011
