= Philipse Manor station =

Metro-North Railroad station in New York

Philipse Manor
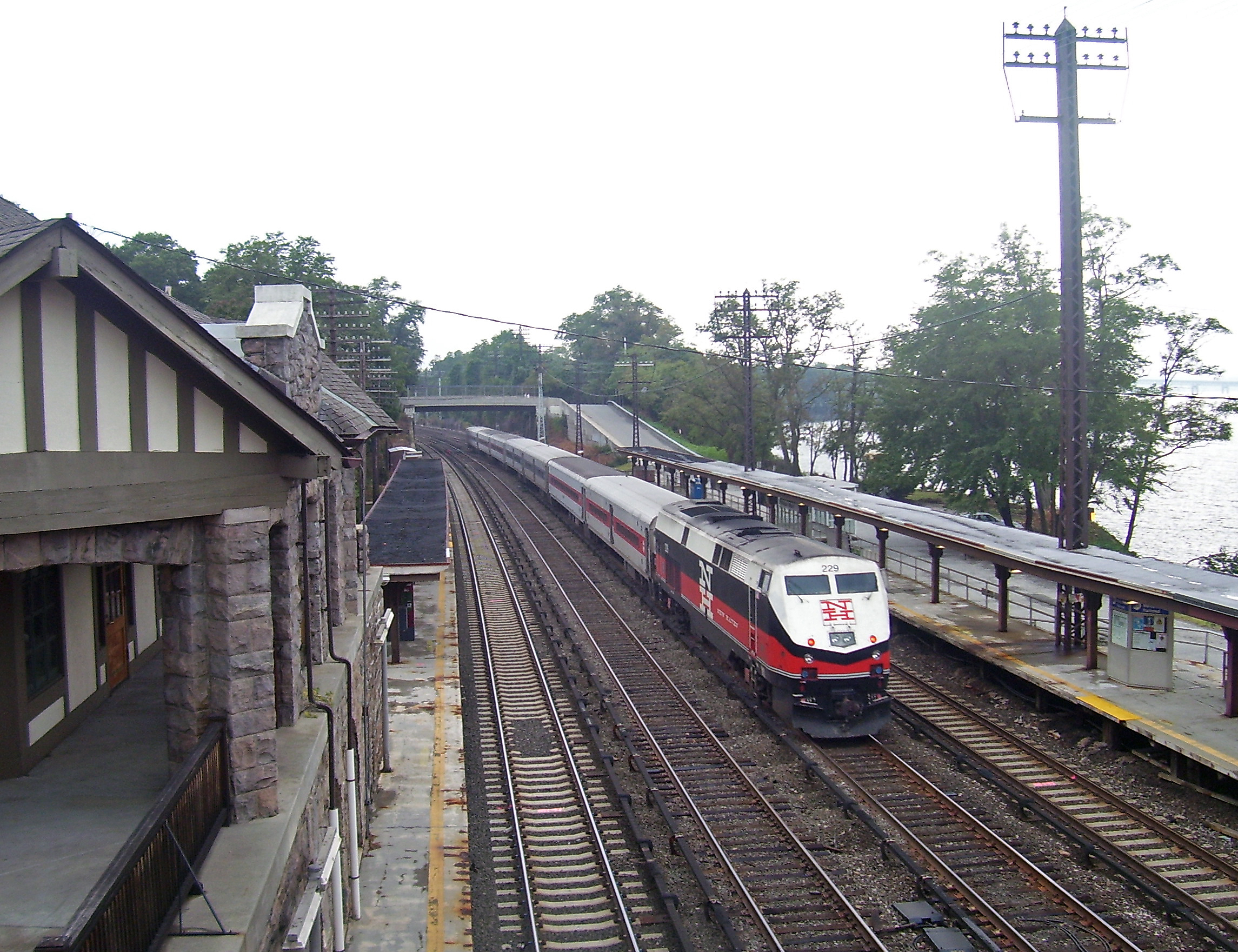
- A northbound express train passes through the station

General information
- Location: 78 Riverside Drive, Sleepy Hollow, New York
- Coordinates: 41°5′41″N 73°52′10″W
- Line: Hudson Line
- Platforms: 2 side platforms
- Tracks: 4

Construction
- Parking: PMIA permit West Side; Village of SH on East Side

Other information
- Fare zone: 5

History
- Opened: January 30, 1911
- Electrified: 700V (DC) third rail

Passengers
- 2018: 389 (Metro-North)
- Rank: 81 of 109

Services
Preceding station	Metro-North Railroad	Following station
Scarborough toward Croton–Harmon	Hudson Line	Tarrytown toward Grand Central

Former services
Preceding station	New York Central Railroad	Following station
Scarborough toward Peekskill	Hudson Division	Tarrytown toward New York
- Philipse Manor Railroad Station
- U.S. National Register of Historic Places
- Coordinates: 41°5′41″N 73°52′10″W
- Area: less than one acre
- Architectural style: Tudor Revival
- NRHP reference No.: 91000237
- Added to NRHP: March 14, 1991
Location

Philipse Manor station is a commuter rail stop on the Metro-North Railroad's Hudson Line, located in the Philipse Manor neighborhood of Sleepy Hollow, New York, United States.

Built around 1910 and opened on January 30, 1911, the Tudorbethan architecture of the station's original has earned it a listing on the National Register of Historic Places as an intact example of an early commuter rail station. It is the only station on the Hudson Line besides Poughkeepsie to be so recognized. The plot of land on which it was built had once been part of the vast Philipsburg Manor, which was confiscated at the end of the American Revolutionary War and auctioned off in parcels. That particular parcel went through several owners, from Rodrigo Curls, a Portuguese immigrant who used it for fishing, to Ambrose Kingsland, a wealthy merchant and politician who had a large country estate along this part of the Hudson River.

== History ==
The construction of the Hudson River Railroad and its later acquisition by the New York Central in the late 19th century opened up the river towns in Westchester County for suburbanization. It became possible for those of sufficient means to live in large houses amid the pastoral and scenic riverside, and accordingly villages like Irvington, Tarrytown and North Tarrytown (today's Sleepy Hollow) began to grow and develop.

Undeveloped areas along the railroad line were soon snapped up by developers who saw the possibilities. In 1899 one, John Brisben Walker, acquired the old Ambrose Kingsland estate in North Tarrytown and began subdividing its northern part while building an automobile plant, the Mobile Company of America, in the southern section. One of his selling points for the residential development, called Philipse Manor in a confused reference to nearby Philipsburg Manor House, (Note: The actual Philipse Manor is in Yonkers, some ten miles (16 km) to the south (both manor houses served the original Philipsburg Manor).) was the rail access, but this failed to materialize. The Mobile Company of America, which produced steam-powered carriages, also failed, and Walker had to sell the property to William Abraham Bell, who had invested in Walker’s automobile venture. The new owner continued the residential construction at Philipse Manor, and the subdivided land was sold under the name Philipse Manor Company. Bell, with his extensive experience in railroad development, made the rail service possible by building the station and presenting it to the railroad. Train service began on January 30, 1911, and wealthy New Yorkers started eagerly buying homes in Philipse Manor.

The station remained in use throughout the private ownership of the railroad. When the Metropolitan Transportation Authority assumed passenger commuter operations of the then-bankrupt Penn Central in the early 1970s and passed it along to Metro-North in 1983, it eventually closed the station house in favor of automated ticketing operations, and the main house fell into disrepair. The station has since been reused as the Hudson Valley Writers Center, which won an award from the Preservation League of New York State for its work on the station in 2005.

As of 2008, the MTA has been working to extend the platforms to accommodate eight-car trains and improve service and capacity. It is part of a $56 million program focused on all the Rivertowns stations. The agency expects it will be complete by 2010.

== Station layout ==
=== Station building ===
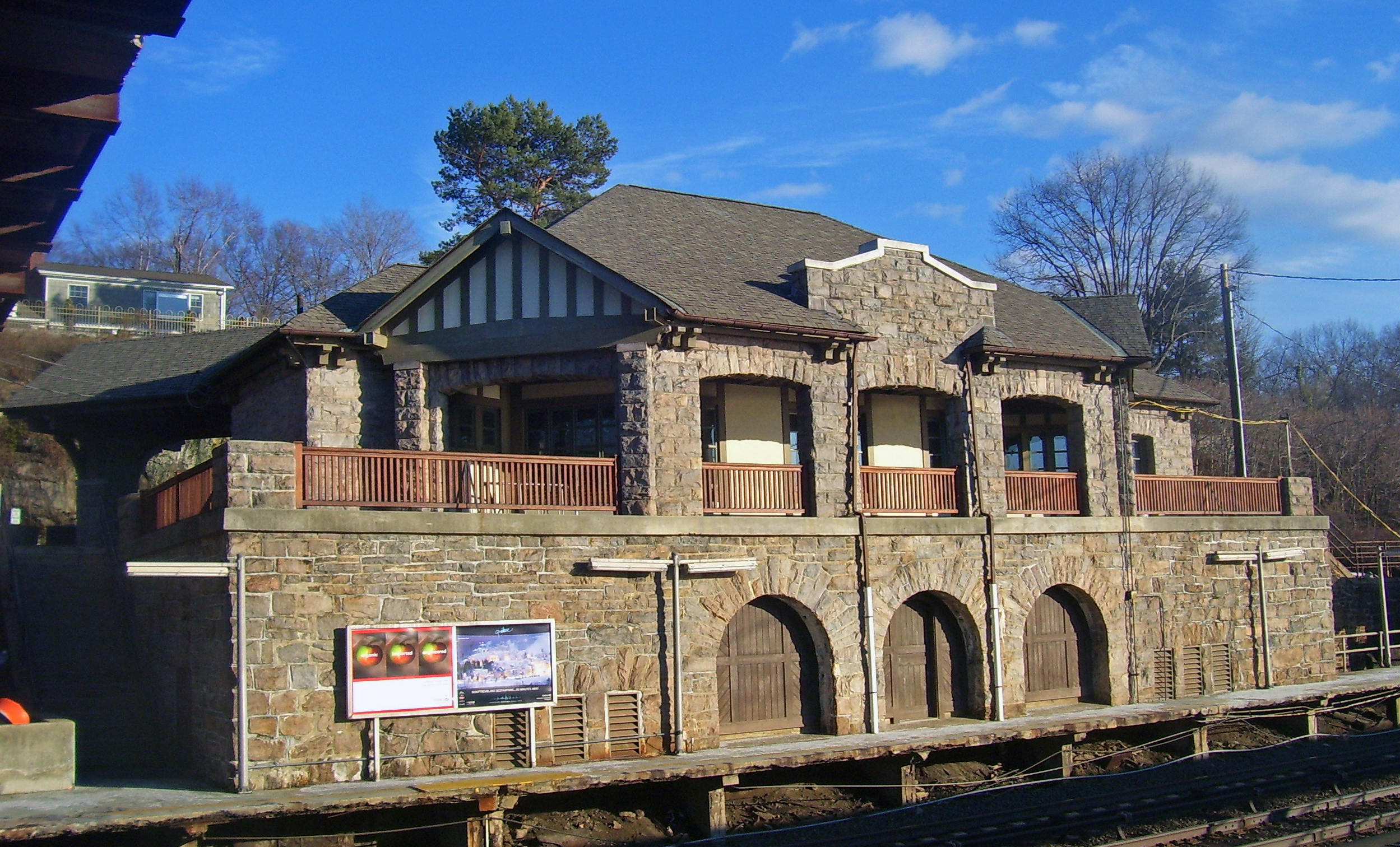
1910 main building, west elevation

The main building (no longer used for rail purposes) is a one-story hip-roofed octagonal structure of rock-faced granite block with stone, stucco and wood trim. It is built into the bluff created when the tracks were cut, and thus access to them was provided through the basement, through doors which have since been bricked off.

The station's east facade is augmented with two gabled porte-cocheres projecting at oblique angles, each supported by a heavy granite pier. Trapezoidal wings also jut from the narrow sides of the octagon. The loggia across the facade has central round arched opening with a parapet. This does not lead to an entrance, instead backing the fireplace and its corbeled stone chimney. The original roof used slate, but it has been replaced with asphalt shingles.

Inside, the fireplace uses several colors of granite, flanked with original iron radiators. It is complemented by dark oak matchboards over the stucco, laid to simulate paneling and form a dado. Further ornamentation includes a double frieze at ceiling level.

=== Platform and track configuration ===
The station has two high-level side platforms, each eight cars long.

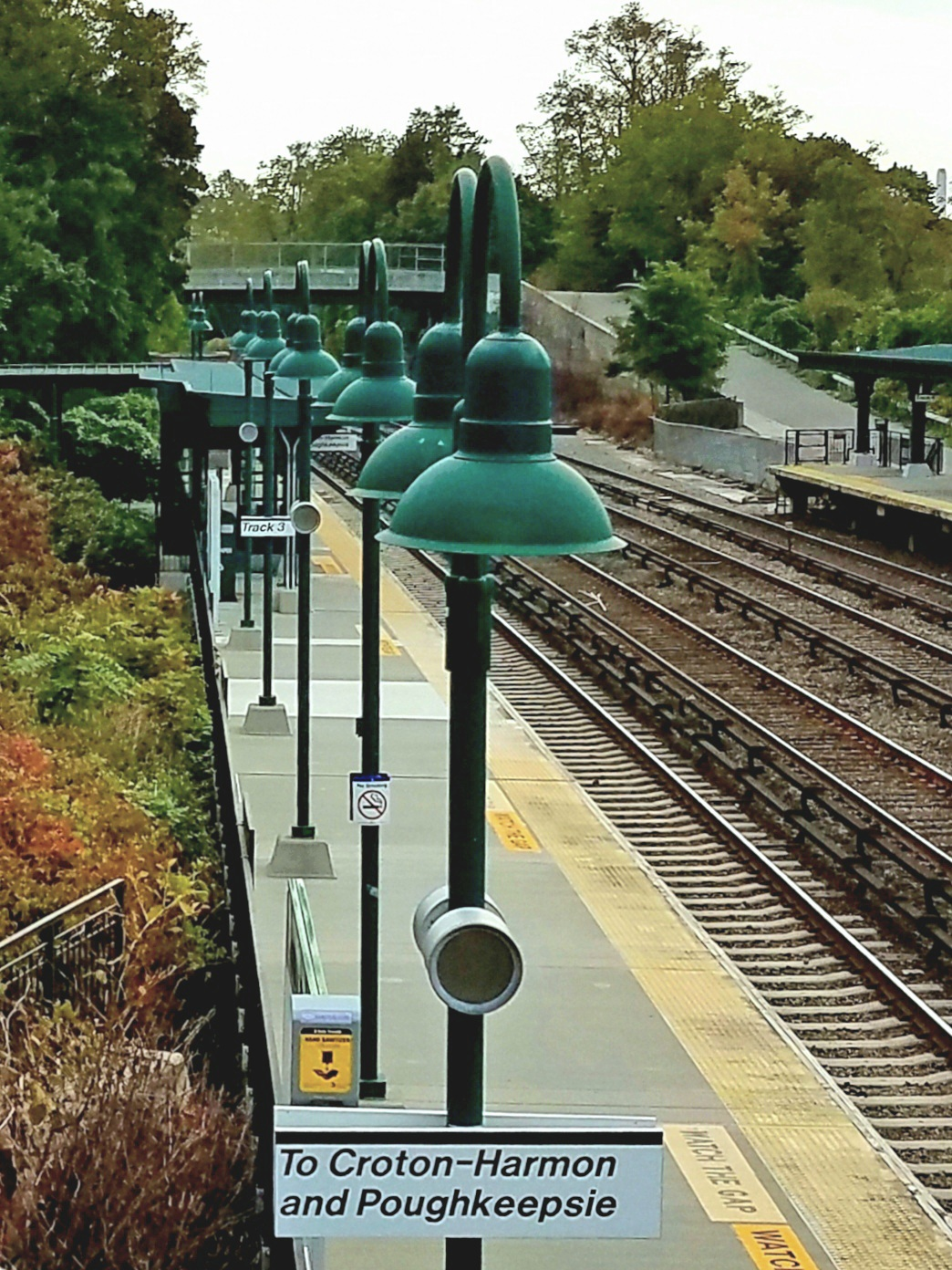
Northbound platform and tracks of the Philipse Manor station in 2020

The more modern station subsequently built by the Metropolitan Transportation Authority (MTA) consists of two long concrete, elevated side platforms with dark-green painted steel shelters. Between them are the four tracks of this section of the Hudson Line, all with third rails. The inside tracks carry express trains, and diesel-powered Amtrak and Metro-North trains bound for the non-electrified sections between Croton–Harmon and the northern end of the line at Poughkeepsie, none of which stop at Philipse Manor. An overpass connects the two platforms.

== Grand Central Eagle ==
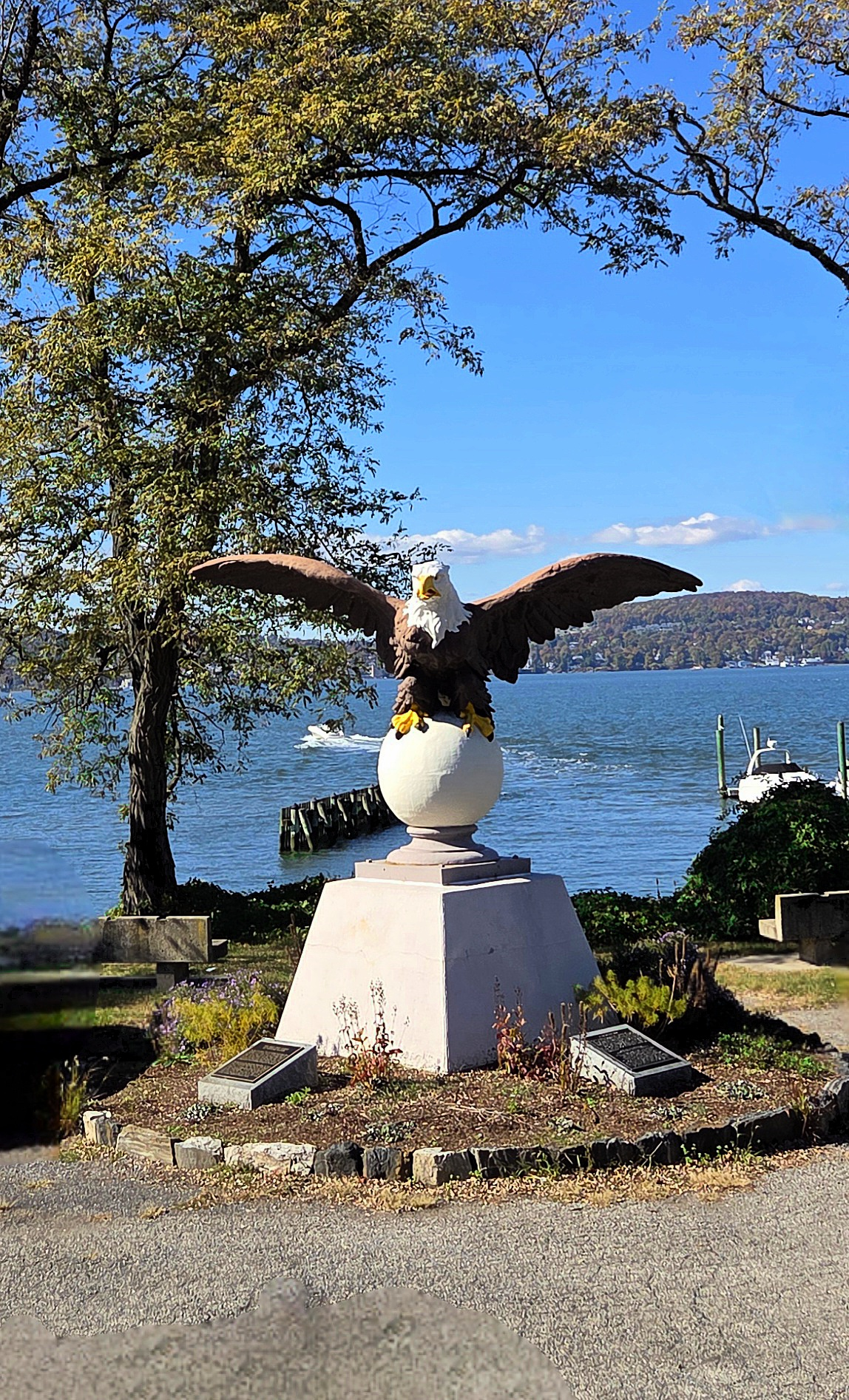
Grand Central Station eagle at Philipse Manor station

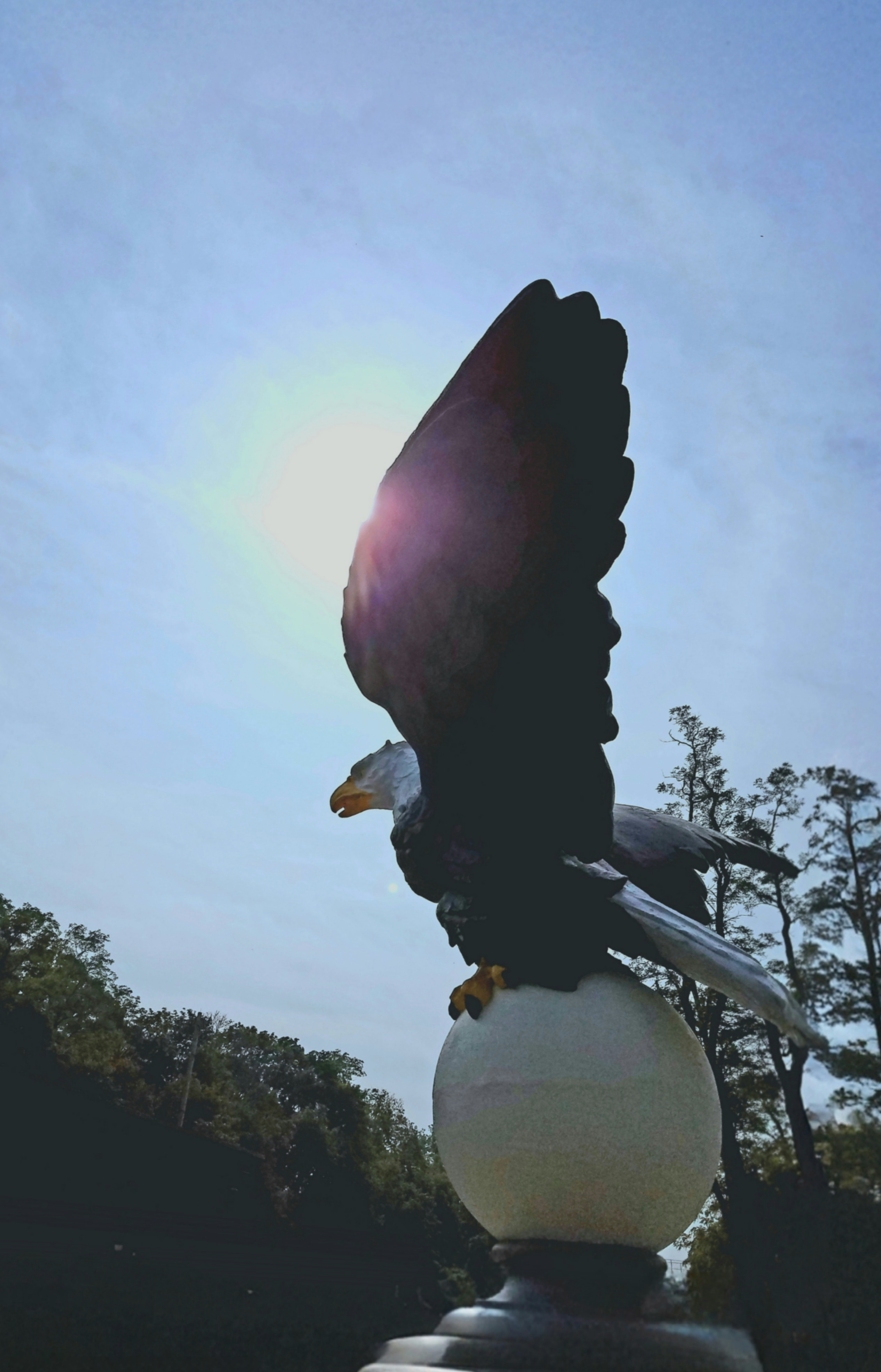
The eagle in 2020

The huge cast-iron eagle facing the southbound platform of the station is one of 11 that graced the monumental clock towers of New York City's Grand Central Station for 12 years between its 1898 renovation and 1910, when the eagles were removed in the process of the demolition of the station and construction of the current Grand Central Terminal building. The eagles were auctioned off to institutions and private estates throughout the metropolitan region. One of them was obtained by William Bell's Philipse Manor Company and installed at Philipse Manor station before its opening in 1911.

The 4,000-pound (1,800 kg) eagle has a 14-foot wingspan. In 2019, the eagle was restored to the appearance matching the two other original eagles that had been recovered and installed above Grand Central Terminal's entrances on Lexington Avenue.

== See also ==
- Historic Hudson Valley
- National Register of Historic Places listings in northern Westchester County, New York
- History of Grand Central Terminal
