= Scarborough station (Metro-North) =

Metro-North Railroad station in New York

Scarborough
- View from Scarborough Park

General information
- Location: 156 Scarborough Station Road, Briarcliff Manor, New York
- Coordinates: 41.1385°N 73.8664°W
- Line: Hudson Line
- Platforms: 2 side platforms
- Tracks: 4

Construction
- Parking: 420 spaces
- Accessible: Yes

Other information
- Fare zone: 5

History
- Rebuilt: 2007
- Electrified: 700V (DC) third rail

Passengers
- 2018: 840 (Metro-North)
- Rank: 60 of 109

Services
Preceding station	Metro-North Railroad	Following station
Ossining toward Croton–Harmon	Hudson Line	Philipse Manor toward Grand Central

Former services
Preceding station	New York Central Railroad	Following station
Ossining toward Peekskill	Hudson Division	Philipse Manor toward New York
Location

Scarborough station is a commuter rail stop on the Metro-North Railroad's Hudson Line, located in the Scarborough area of Briarcliff Manor, New York. Trains leave for New York City every hour on weekdays, and about every 25 minutes during rush hour. It is 28.7 miles (46.2 km) from Grand Central Terminal, and the trip there takes about 50 minutes. Trains of electric multiple units serve the station. The Scarborough station is within walking distance of most houses in the neighborhood.

Construction of the Scarborough station dates back to the 1860s, when the first station building stood along the Hudson River Railroad, which was completed in 1851 and served areas from New York City to Rensselaer. It became part of the Metropolitan Transportation Authority's Metro-North Railroad in 1983, following the devolution of commuter rail service from Conrail. The station was included in a revitalization plan in 2007 to help serve its commuters. The 1899 station building has housed the Scarborough post office since 1961.

== History ==
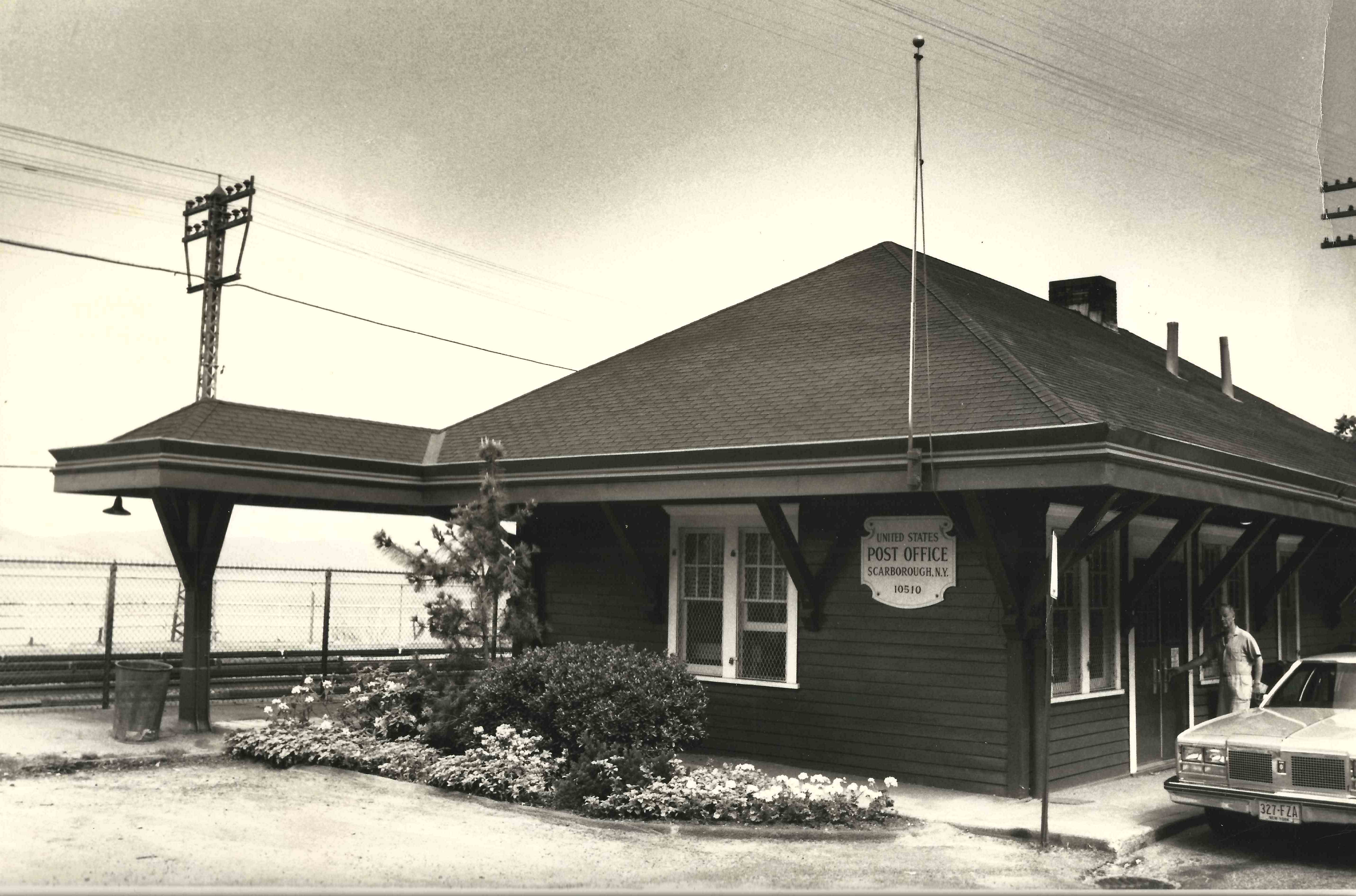
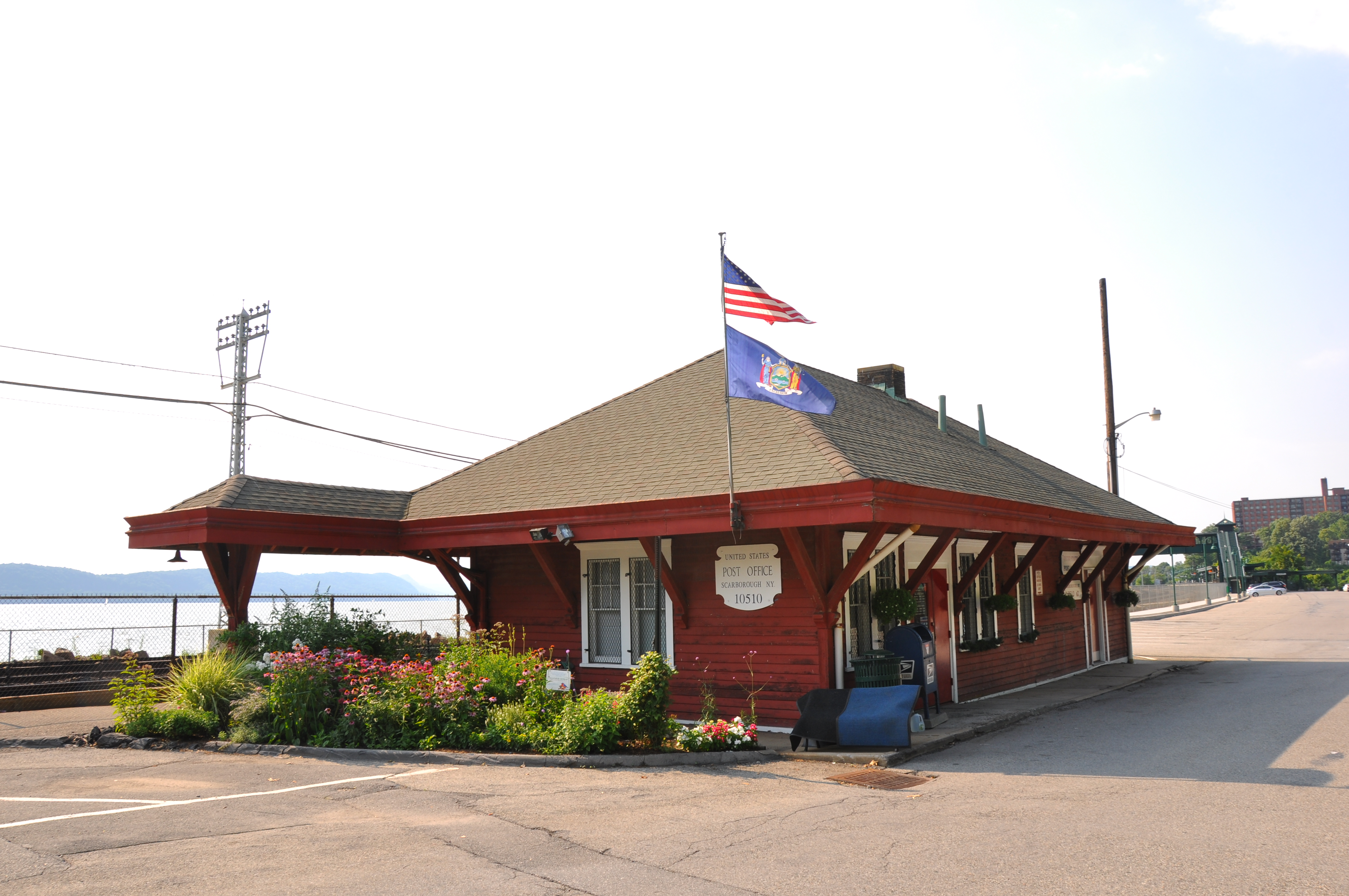
Former station building and current post office c. 1970s and in 2014
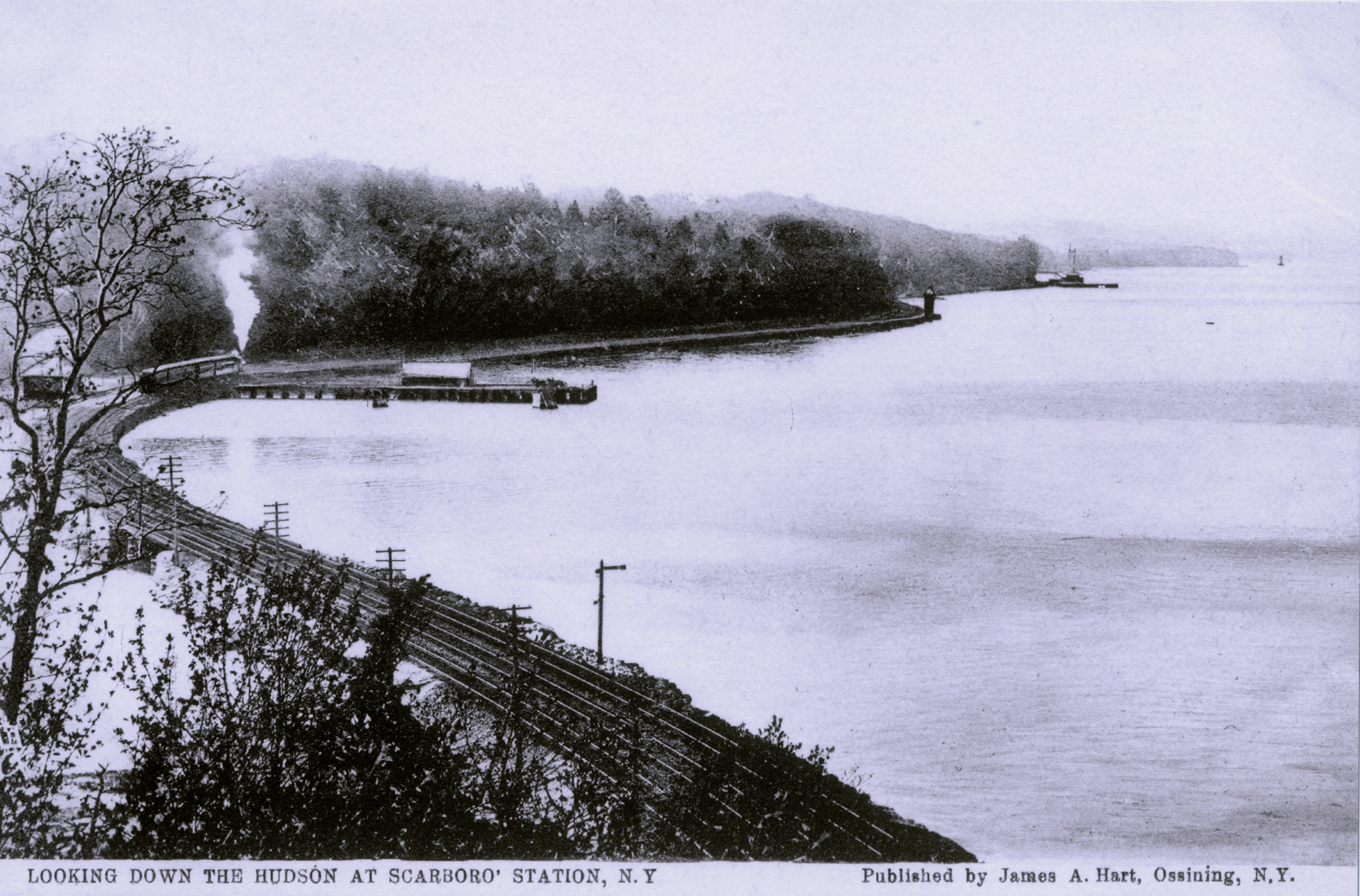
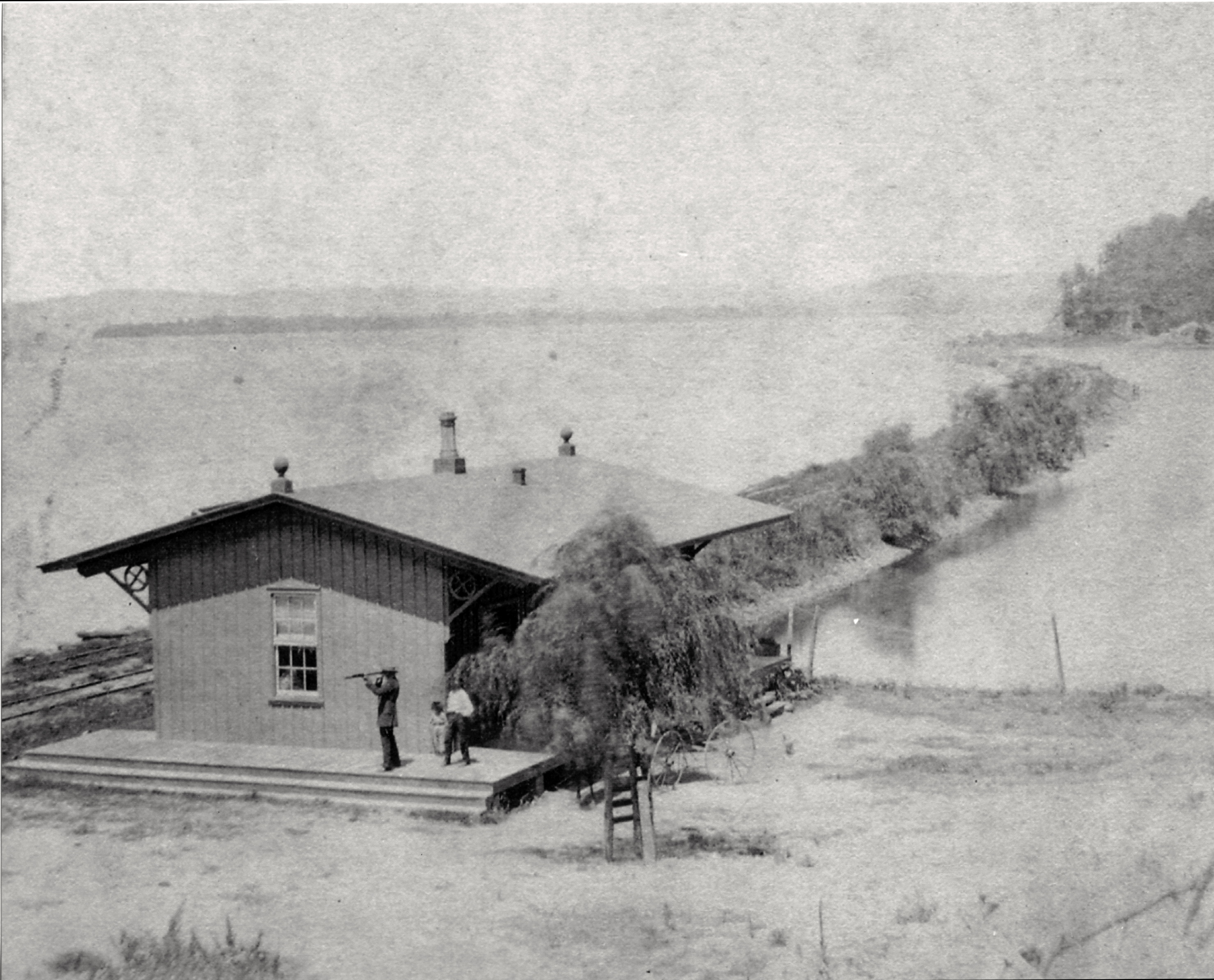
Early images of the Scarborough station

The first station building was built by the Hudson River Railroad sometime before 1860, and acquired by the New York Central and Hudson River Railroad in 1869. The station was named "Scarborough" until 1867. On July 16 of that year and until November 26, the area was officially called Weskora. The Scarborough station was accordingly changed by local government officials to "Weskora", and changed back in December 1867.

The Scarborough post office dates to December 3, 1864, when the U.S. Postal Service established a "catch and throw" office there in the same small building as the earlier established station. A hook was installed along the tracks to hang mail bags to be grabbed by workers on the passing trains for outgoing mail distribution; in turn workers threw mail bags off the train for incoming mail distribution. The first postmaster of the Scarborough Post Office facility was James Van Velsor who had an annual salary of $200 ($5,400 in 2025) in 1873.

A large thunderstorm occurred in the area on August 4, 1898; the newly renovated station building, built in 1893, was struck by lightning and burned to the ground. At the time, the building also housed Scarborough's post office. Mail was destroyed although registered mail and money was being kept at the postmaster's house each night; damage amounted to $5,000 ($193,500 in 2025) and the post office opened the next day, with mail being held in a pushcart. The building was reconstructed identically to its predecessor.

In 1909, after the community of Scarborough was incorporated into the village of Briarcliff Manor in 1906, the New York Central and Hudson River Railroad put up a sign reading "Briarcliff West" at the station. Soon afterward, attributed to the neighborhood's pride over their name, that sign was thrown into the Hudson River and replaced with the original Scarborough sign.

In April 1931, Siamese King Prajadhipok and Queen Rambai Barni traveled from Bangkok to Ophir Hall (currently Reid Hall of Manhattanville College). The couple had flown from Japan to Vancouver and took a train to Chicago. From Chicago, they took another train, departing at 10:30 a.m. on the 21st and arriving at noon on the 22nd, and the trip took 25 hours; the king had requested the train travel slowly, as he was recovering from bronchitis and malaria. The train arrived at the Scarborough station, where journalists, spectators, and video and still photographers met them, along with one of their hosts. They were later driven across the county to stay at Ophir Hall for about six weeks in order for a cataract operation to be performed on the king's left eye. State troopers and a squad of New York Central policemen were stationed at Scarborough to ensure a smooth transfer. At the time, the king was an absolute monarch; he later became the country's first constitutional monarch.

The Briarcliff Manor village government purchased the 1899 station building in 1961 to house its Scarborough post office. The building was used as a filming location in 1966, in the first episode of the television soap opera Dark Shadows as the Collinsport train station.

As with the rest of the Hudson Line, the Scarborough station became a Penn Central station once the New York Central and Pennsylvania Railroads merged in 1968. Penn Central's continuous financial despair throughout the 1970s forced them to turn over their commuter service to the Metropolitan Transportation Authority. The station and the railroad were turned over to Conrail in 1976, and eventually became part of the MTA's Metro-North Railroad in 1983. In 2007, the MTA overhauled the station, installing new systems such as platforms, canopies, shelters, enclosed staircases, lighting, and benches. The station's overpass was demolished and a replacement was built with elevators on either side. The new overpass was designed in a less modern style and now has glass-sided elevators. During the construction, Metro-North built a temporary wooden station to the station's south.

In 2010, Metro-North began a program called Arts for Transit. As part of the program, an art installation was created for the station. The work, titled Untitled with Sky, comprises six stained glass windows and twelve seats covered in mosaic tiles. Liliana Porter and Ana Tiscornia worked with Willet Hauser Architectural Glass to create the installations. The windows were originally intended for the overpass, where they were installed for a short time. Around 2011, the windows were moved to the southbound platform. Also in 2011, Hurricane Irene caused a mudslide onto the tracks near the Scarborough station; it damaged 300 feet (91 m) of third rail.

Local community members have been maintaining the inside and outside of the building through labor and monetary donations under the group name "Save Scarborough", and brought attention to the post office's 150th anniversary, celebrated on December 3, 2014. About twenty members began their work around 2010, concerned that the downsizing United States Postal Service would close the Scarborough post office, which is a branch of the Briarcliff Manor post office. As of 2014, the group has spent almost $4,000 in various renovations, upkeep, and improvement costs.

=== Notable passengers ===
Ridership is moderate, relative to the other Hudson Line stations, with an average of 865 inbound passengers on weekdays and 233 on weekends in 2007. Historical ridership included many notable passengers, including William Rockefeller, John D. Rockefeller, C. C. Clarke (the First Vice President of the Hudson River Railroad), Margaret Louisa Vanderbilt Shepard, Walter William Law, and the Webb family.

== Station layout ==
Siamese King Prajadhipok arriving at the station in 1931

Old overpass; from Scarborough Park, 2003

The station's parking lot has had a valet service since the station overhaul in 2007. The ongoing construction took up parking spaces, which spurred the village government to institute valet parking. The parking service has remained since the construction finished. A private contractor has an agreement with the village for three employees to manage that part of the lot. An additional section of the station parking lot is privately owned. The valet service has no extra charge.

=== Platform and track configuration ===
All of the tracks are powered with a third rail, except Track 1. The station has two high-level side platforms, each eight cars long.

== Gallery ==
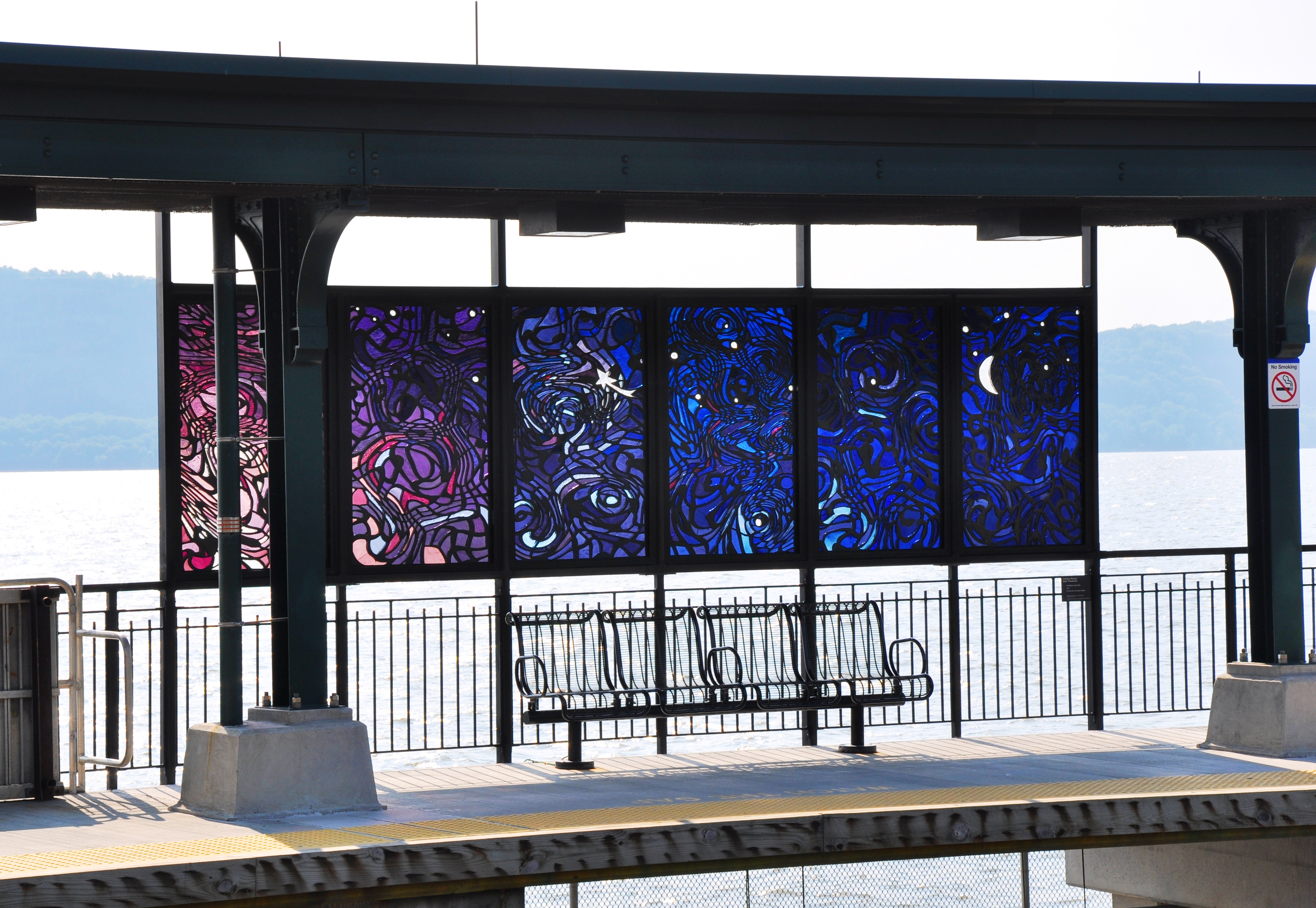
Untitled with Sky

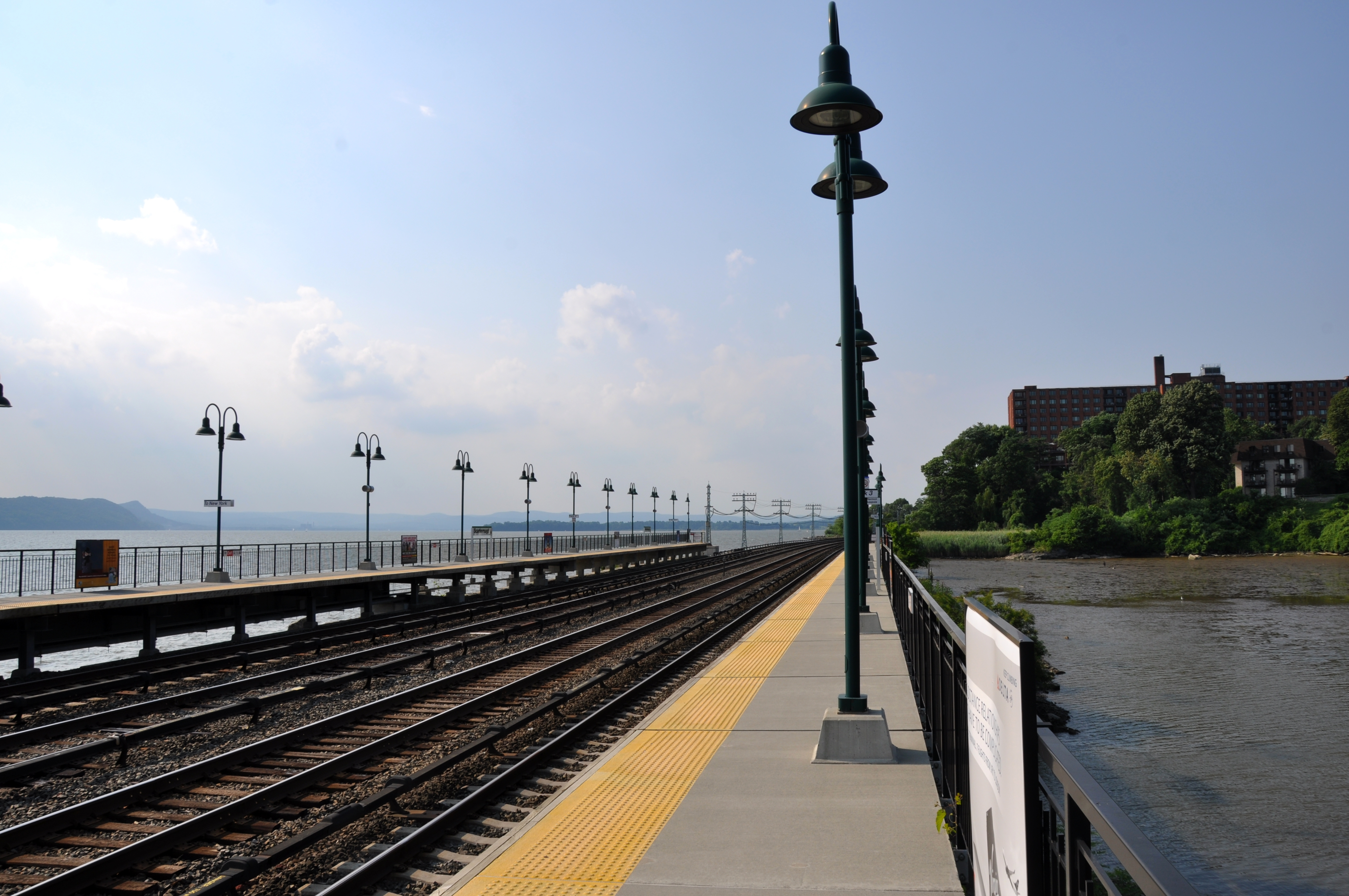
View from tracks

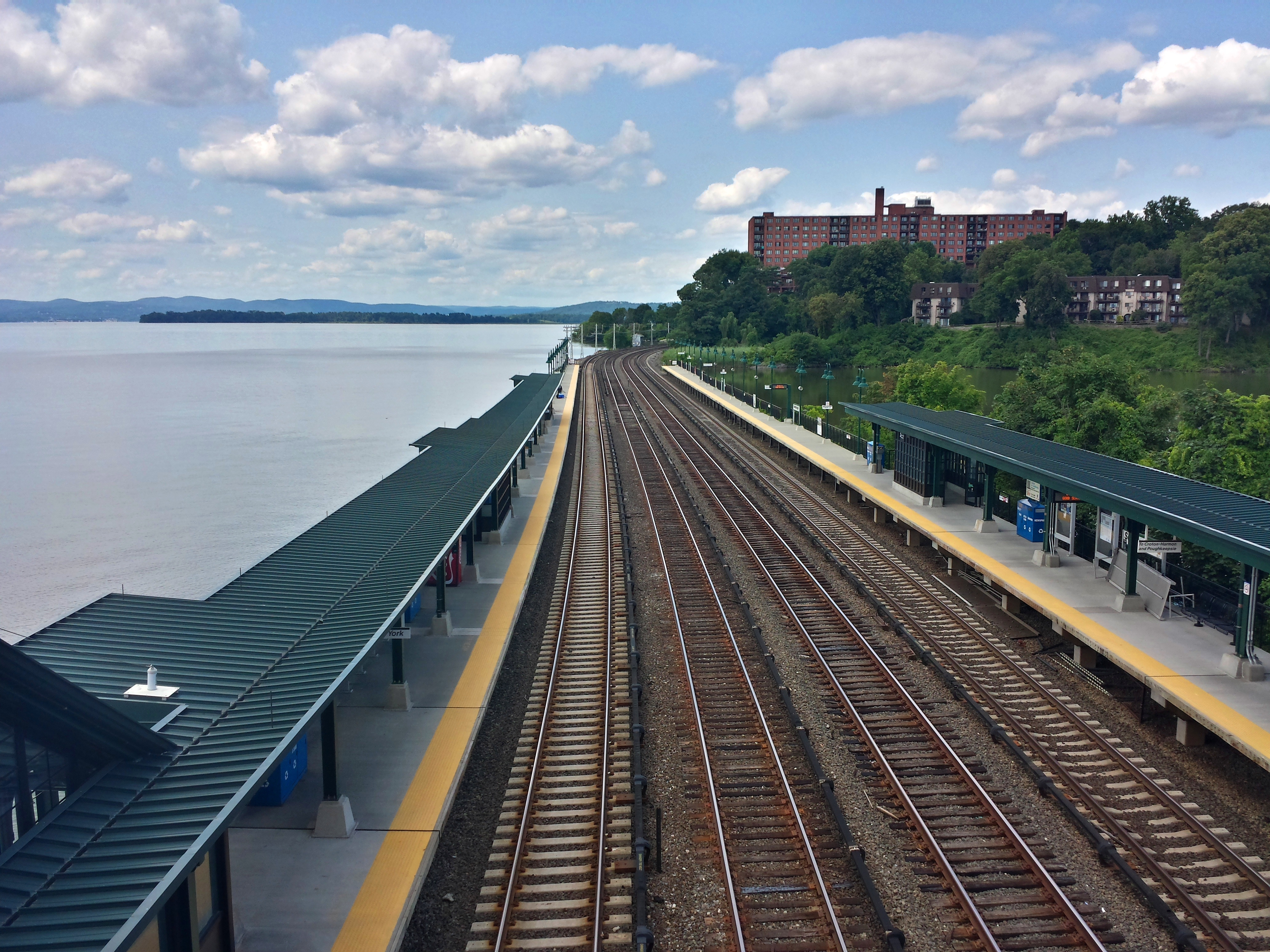
View from overpass

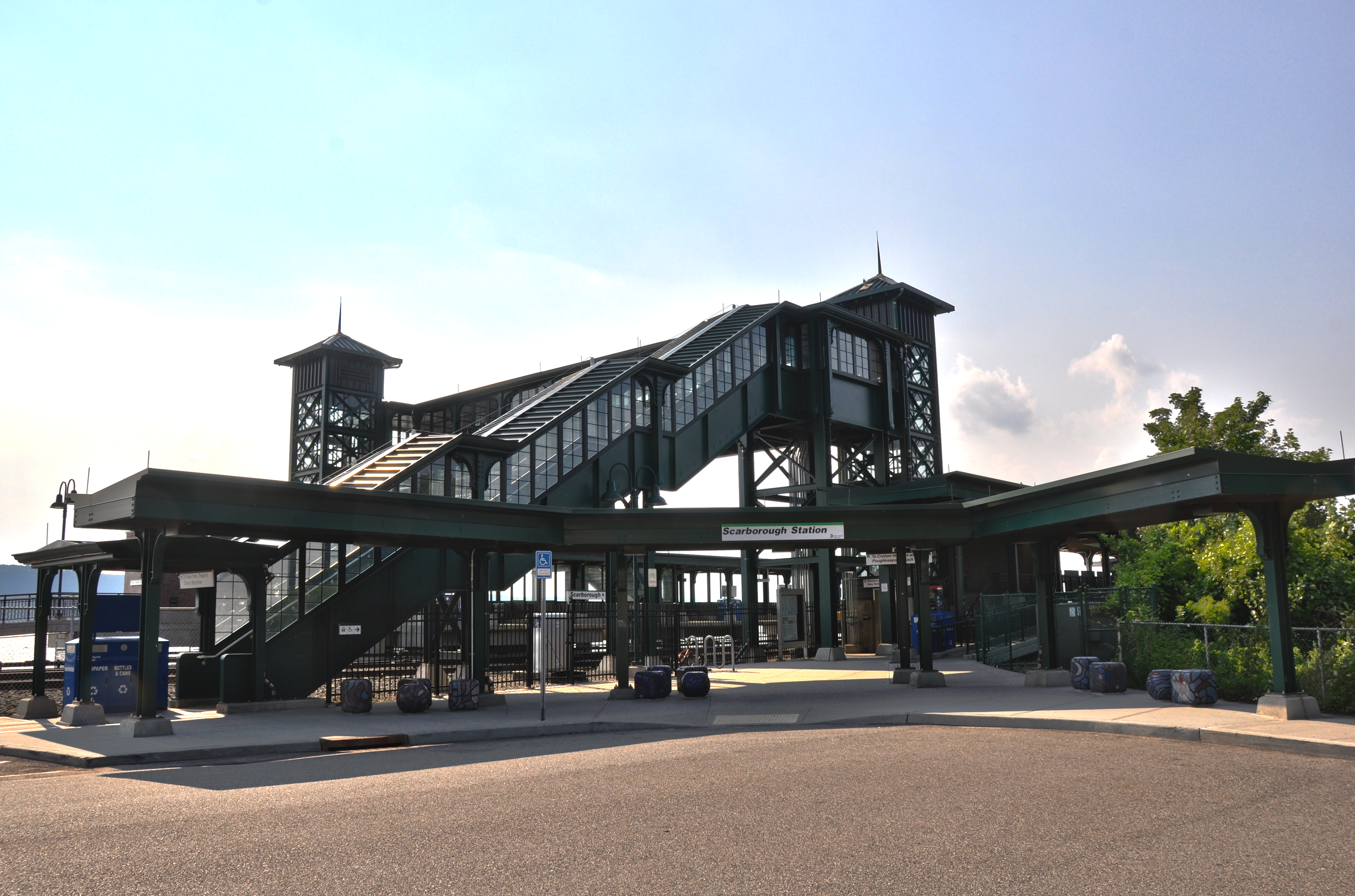
Station entrance
