= Volvo D13 =

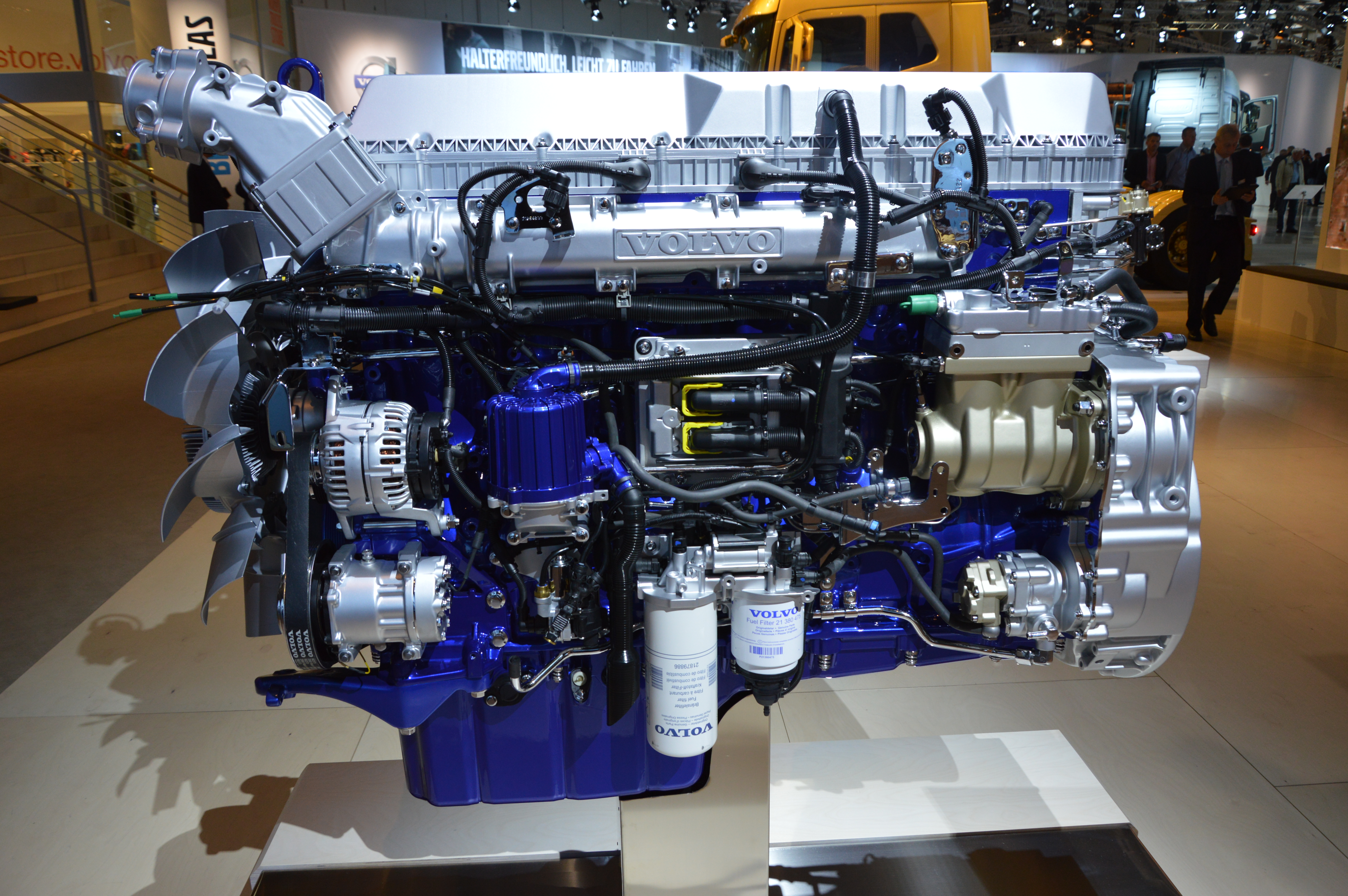
- Volvo D13 engine

Overview
- Manufacturer: Volvo

Layout
- Configuration: I6
- Displacement: 12.8 L (779.7 cu in)
- Cylinder bore: 131 mm (5.16 in)
- Piston stroke: 158 mm (6.22 in)
- Cylinder block material: cast iron
- Cylinder head material: cast iron, one piece
- Valvetrain: 4V / OHC
- Compression ratio: 17:1

RPM range
- Max. engine speed: 2100 RPM

Combustion
- Turbocharger: sliding nozzle variable geometry
- Fuel system: common rail
- Fuel type: ultra-low sulfur diesel
- Oil system: SAE 10W-30, 36 L (38 US qt)

Output
- Power output: 280–746 kW; 380–1,014 PS (375–1,000 hp)
- Torque output: 1,970–2,510 N⋅m (1,450–1,850 lb⋅ft)

Dimensions
- Dry weight: 1,182 kg (2,606 lb)

Emissions
- Emissions target standard: Euro II / IIIA / IV / V; EPA Tier 2 / 3 / 4f

The Volvo D13 is a turbo diesel engine family manufactured by Volvo which shares a four-stroke, inline-six design with a nominal engine displacement of 780 cu in (12.8 L). It replaced the Volvo TD12 series and D12 engines. On-road versions are available for use in heavy-duty vehicles, including semi-trailer trucks, vocational trucks such as dump trucks, as well as motorcoaches, and motorhomes, with off-road and marine versions available from Volvo Penta, including stationary industrial uses such as power generation and marine powerplants for tugboats, ferries, tourist boats, and yachts.The rated output power varies from 375 to 1,000 hp (280 to 746 kW; 380 to 1,014 PS), depending on the model.

== History ==
The first D13 models were introduced in 2005 as a replacement for the Volvo D12. For the North American market, the D13 was introduced in 2007 to meet contemporary emissions standards.
