= Guillermo Silva Santamaria =

Colombian artist (1921–2007)

- Born: 7 June 1921; Bogotá, Colombia
- Died: 29 June 2007 (aged 86); Jevnaker, Norway
- Occupation: artist
- Years active: 1948–2007
- Known for: intaglio

Guillermo Silva Santamaria (7 June 1921 – 29 June 2007) was a Colombian painter, printmaker and Surrealist. He was a recognized master of intaglio and exhibited his works on 4 continents during his lengthy career. He trained many students in his techniques during his teaching career in Mexico before moving to India and settling in Europe.

== Biography ==
Guillermo Silva Santamaria was born 7 June 1921 in Bogotá, Colombia. In 1937, he went to Paris and studied with the French master Pierre Daguet an impressionist style similar to Van Gogh. After 2 years, he returned to Colombia, but had no success with his art and took a job in a pharmaceutical company.

He continued to study art, and participated in art shows, holding his first solo exhibit in 1948. That same year, he travelled to the United States and France, returning to Bogotá in 1949 to establish the first stained glass workshop in Colombia with French artist Jean Crotti. Silva began teaching at the Escuela de Bellas Artes (School of Fine Arts) in 1950 and again was studying in Europe in 1951. For a decade, he struggled with his art, but after a vacation to Machu Picchu in Peru, he began producing geometric abstractions. Praise from his contemporaries led him to move to Mexico in 1956, where he studied engraving with Isidoro Ocampo at Escuela Nacional de Pintura, Escultura y Grabado "La Esmeralda". The following year, Silva traveled to St. Louis, Missouri to take a printmaking course at Washington University. His first show in the US occurred in 1957 and he returned to Mexico City and began teaching at the Iberoamericana University and later at the National Autonomous University of Mexico.

Silva's works demonstrated his mastery of intaglio and he was credited with being unequaled in Latin America. His technique was praised as "unique" achieving an apparent incision of inks by controlled viscosity. Though often depicting gruesome themes, the works were satirically presented social commentaries. He held his first European show Sweden in 1961 and that same year won the first prize of engraving at The Canadian Painters and Etchers Society exhibition held at the Royal Ontario Museum.

In the 1970s, Silva worked in a studio in Mexico City as well as one in Málaga, Spain, and exhibited widely from New York to Toronto, to Spain, to Mexico City, to Arizona, to New Mexico. In addition, his works were exhibited in the Bogotá Museum of Modern Art Boston Museum of Fine Arts, Brooklyn Museum, the Jewish Center of San Diego, the Library of Congress in Washington, DC, the London Museum, Museum of Modern Art in New York, La Escuela Nacional de Belles Artes Arango (The National School of Fine Arts, Arango) in Bogota, the Philadelphia Museum of Art, and Santiago Museum of Contemporary Art, among others.

He lived in India for 10 years in the 1980s studying yoga and then returned to Málaga, Spain, where he continued to paint and took up sculpting as well. From 1993 until his death, Silva spent his summers in Norway exhibiting his works. He died in his motor home near Roenland (a locality of Jevnaker, Norway) on 29 June 2007 and was buried in Jevnaker on 3 July 2007. His exhibit which was scheduled to open August 5 was to continue as planned.
