= Croton North station =

Railway station in Croton-on-Hudson, New York

Croton North
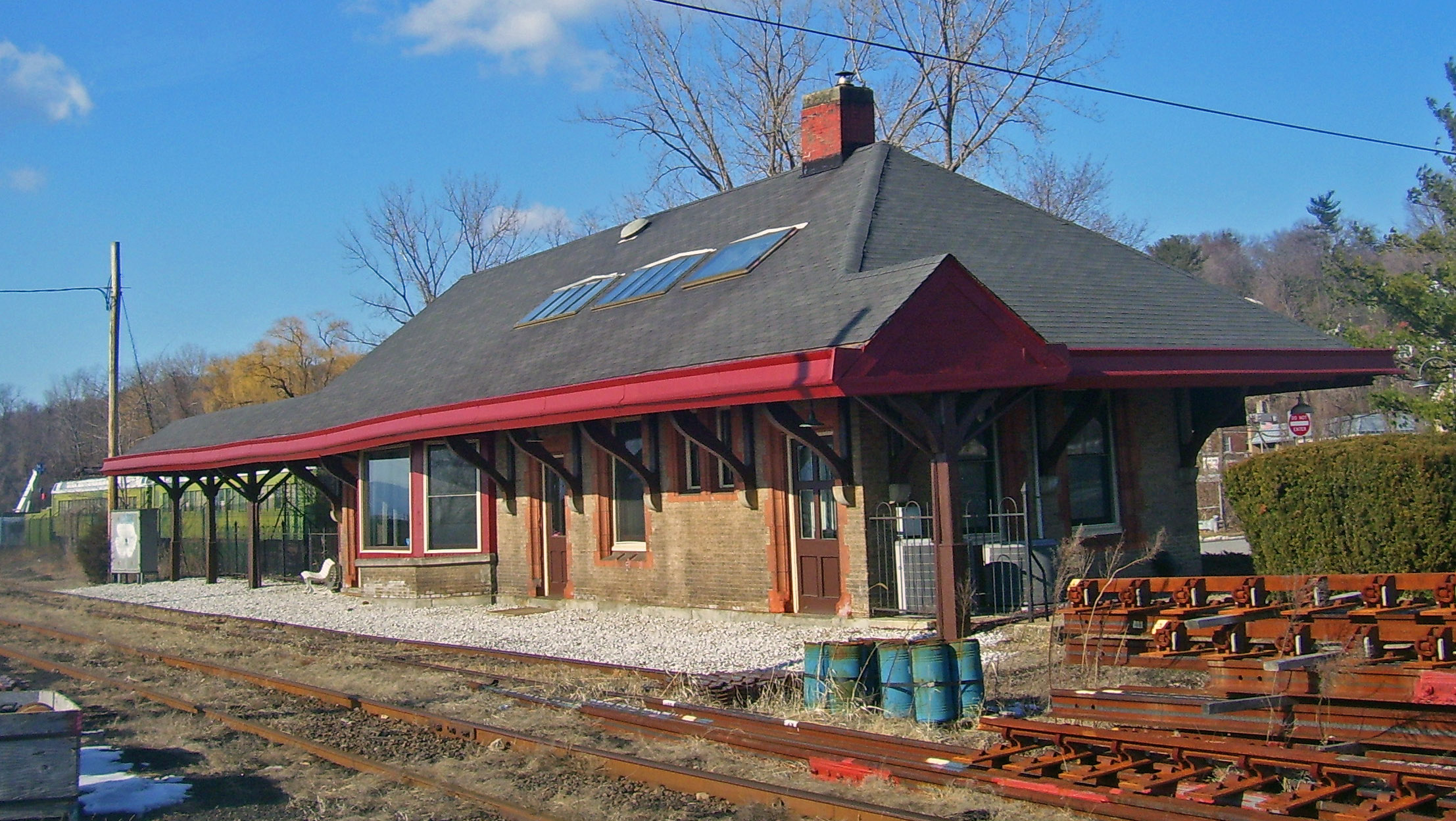
- West and south elevations, 2009

General information
- Location: 1 Senasqua Road, Croton-on-Hudson, Westchester County, New York 10520
- Platforms: 1 side
- Tracks: 4

History
- Opened: September 29, 1849
- Former names: Collaberg; Croton-on-Hudson (–April 28, 1963)

Former services
Preceding station	New York Central Railroad	Following station
Crugers toward Peekskill	Hudson Division	Croton toward New York
Oscawana toward Peekskill	Hudson Division	Croton toward New York
- Croton North Railroad Station
- U.S. National Register of Historic Places
- Location: 1 Senasqua Road, Croton-on-Hudson, New York
- Coordinates: 41°12′25″N 73°53′40″W
- Area: 2 acres (8,100 m^{2})
- Built: Ca. 1890
- Architect: New York Central Railroad
- NRHP reference No.: 87001458
- Added to NRHP: August 27, 1987
Location

Croton North station is a disused train station on Senasqua Road in Croton-on-Hudson, New York, United States. It was built by the New York Central Railroad in the late 19th century. In 1987 it was listed on the National Register of Historic Places as Croton North Railroad Station.

It had long been out of active service, and was converted to office use three years before the listing. Despite the conversion it remains largely intact, and is considered an excellent example of a commuter railroad station from this era, when stations began to reflect the industrial role of the railroads. Included in the listing are two 1930s Pullman electric passenger coaches parked on a disconnected spur north of the station.

== Building and grounds ==
The property included in the listing is a narrow 2-acre (8,100 m^{2}) parcel along railroad tracks currently owned by the Metro-North commuter railroad and also used by Amtrak and CSX Transportation for intercity passenger rail and freight respectively. Two disused sidings lead to the station building from the main Hudson Line tracks, the south end of a working rail yard used primarily by CSX, approximately one mile (1.6 km) northwest of Metro-North's Croton–Harmon station and its Harmon Yard maintenance facility.

Automotive access is from Senasqua Road, a short service road along the west side of U.S. Route 9. It rejoins US-9 southbound at its southern end and provides access to the rest of Croton-on-Hudson via an overpass to New York State Route 9A at the interchange at its northern end. The station is the only building along Senasqua Road. There is a small unpaved lot, the end of a short driveway to the rail yard, to the east and south of the station. A row of mature trees along the road. Across the tracks, to the southwest, is Elliott Way and the parking area for Croton Landing Park on the Hudson River.

The station building itself is a one-story rectangular building topped by an asphalt-shingled hipped roof. Brownish brick faces its load-bearing clay tile walls. At the top its roof is pierced by a brick chimney; three skylights are on the west slope. Its wide overhanging eaves are supported by large wooden brackets. A canopy extends out over the former platform, now filled with gravel and serving as a patio, a short distance on the south, and farther along the north.

At the north end the wall curves into a five-facet section with full windows. A hip-roofed porte-cochère, now enclosed with concrete blocks painted with stucco, extends from the center of the east section. Fenestration is irregular; doors and windows have terra cotta surrounds.

The main entrance is located at the southwest junction of the porte-cochère and the rest of the building. Inside the rooms have been renovated for their current use as office space. Much of their original layout and some finishes remain. The porte-cochère has been divided into two rooms, one faced in glass block. The former waiting room retains its high ceilings.

On a disconnected stretch of track just north of the station are two Pullman-Electric passenger cars. Inside they have their original furnishings, with upholstered seats, overhead luggage racks and cab compartments. They were built in the 1930s and have the livery of the Erie Railroad, which operated them on tracks in New Jersey. They were never used on the line in New York that served the station. Since they are in an appropriate historical setting, they are considered contributing objects to the National Register listing.

== History ==
The original stations built by the Hudson River Railroad in the mid-19th century were cottage-like Picturesque wooden board-and-batten structures, in keeping with a popular regional style. None of these are extant. As the railroad became part of the New York Central and linked to the expanding national railway network, traffic increased and the original stations were no longer adequate.

Starting around 1860, the Central built new stations reflecting the railroads' wider economic role. These showed the influence of industrialization, and were often rectangular structures of brick. Four of them remain today. (Note: Two (Peekskill and Cold Spring) survive on the Metro-North portion of the line (the former is partially a restaurant today; the latter is exclusively one and is not part of the modern station complex a short distance to its south). North of the current end of commuter service at Poughkeepsie, the Hudson station is still used by Amtrak while the Stuyvesant station is no longer used for any rail-related purpose.)

A third wave of stations came along later in the century and continued into the early decades of the next. These buildings reflected the emergence of the automobile and the consequent growth of the highway network. In response to these needs, railroads began developing more architecturally sophisticated stations, primarily by contracting with architectural firms such as Warren and Wetmore, who designed Grand Central Terminal for the Central. These stations show a great deal of variation, and no two are exactly alike. Their commons design features such as the overhanging roof and linear form are still recognized as typical of rail stations today

While Warren and Wetmore designed other Central stations outside of New York City such as Mount Vernon and Hyde Park, the small Croton North station was a product of the railroad's own engineering department. It has many of the standard features of the era's stations, such as the hip roof with broad eaves to shelter waiting passengers and linear form, but reflects some other contemporary architectural trends as well.

The faceted north end, breaking up the otherwise absolute rectilinearity of the building, is a mark of the Queen Anne Style then popular with homebuilders. The connection is further evidenced by the asymmetrical roof and irregular fenestration. Lastly the choice of materials, with quoined terra cotta surrounds in the brick and large but carefully crafted wooden brackets supporting the roof, is another sign of the Queen Anne style.

These features also serve to enhance the building's functionality. The location within of specific interior functions such as the waiting room and ticket office is evident from the outside. The porte-cochère and canopy completely shelter the traveler in his or her transition from street vehicle to train.

Initially, the station complex included an iron bridge that crossed not only the tracks, but also what is now the expressway. This bridge deteriorated to the point that it was removed at some point after the station was listed on the Register. The station was renamed from Croton-on-Hudson to Croton-North in April 1963.

The Central stopped service to the station in the 1960s. However, according to Hudson Division/Line Timetables published during the era of Penn Central (February 1, 1968-March 31, 1976), Conrail (April 1, 1976-December 31, 1982) & Metro-North (January 1, 1983-1984) Commuter Services, many trains stopped here. It was vacant and neglected until its conversion for office use in 1984, a project that did not significantly alter the station beyond enclosing the porte-cochère. Two years later, in 1986, a small section of new track was laid north of the station to accommodate the Pullman cars. There have been no alterations since. Today it is the offices of an electrical contractor and architect.

== See also ==
- National Register of Historic Places listings in northern Westchester County, New York
