= Oscawana station =

Former railroad station in New York State

Oscawana

General information
- Coordinates: 41.2241°N 73.9204°W
- Line: Empire Corridor

History
- Closed: July 2, 1973

Former services
Preceding station	New York Central Railroad	Following station
Crugers toward Peekskill	Hudson Division	Croton North toward New York
Location

Oscawana station was a commuter rail stop on the New York Central's Hudson Line, located in the hamlet of Crugers, New York. It was closed by Penn Central on July 2, 1973, along with Manitou, Chelsea, and New Hamburg, due to low ridership.
