= Crugers station =

Metro-North Railroad station in New York

Coordinates: 41.2353°N 73.9280°W

Crugers
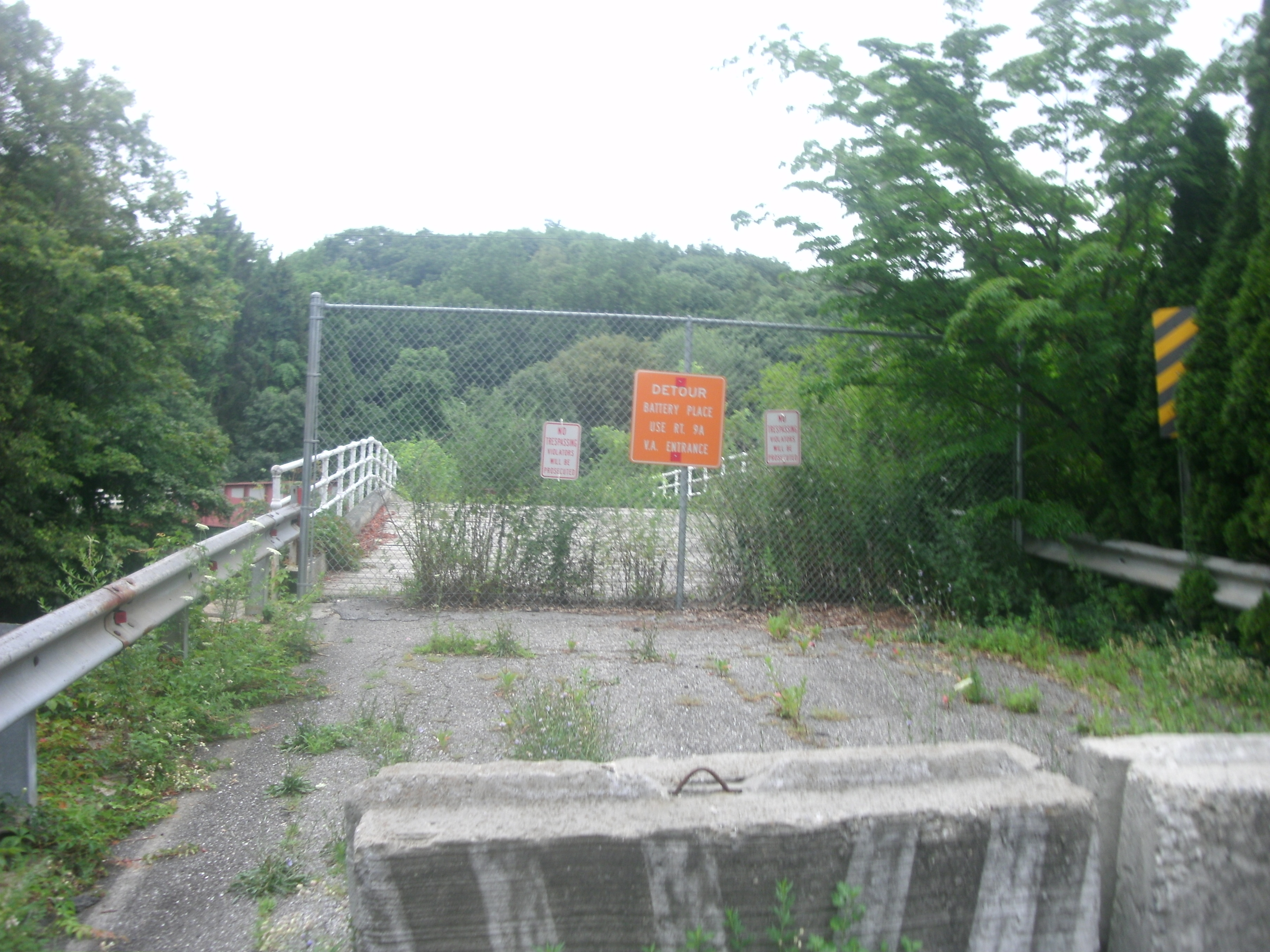
- Closed bridge at the former station in 2011

General information
- Location: Crugers Avenue and Crugers Station Road; Crugers, New York
- Line: Hudson Line

Construction
- Parking: 48 spaces

History
- Closed: June 30, 1996

Former services
Preceding station	Metro-North Railroad	Following station
Montrose toward Poughkeepsie	Hudson Line	Croton–Harmon toward Grand Central
Preceding station	New York Central Railroad	Following station
Montrose toward Peekskill	Hudson Division	Croton North toward New York
Montrose toward Peekskill	Hudson Division	Oscawana toward New York
Location

Crugers station was a commuter rail stop on the Metro-North Railroad's Hudson Line, located in the hamlet of Crugers, New York. It was closed in 1996 when it and the next station northbound, Montrose, was replaced by the Cortlandt station between them.

== History ==
The station, which still remains in part, was replaced in the last stage of a project to expand the Hudson Line to six-car high-level platforms. While it was possible to add high-level platforms, space constraints from adjacent protected wetlands, a bridge abutment, and track curvature precluded the possibility of lengthened platforms or expanded parking.

On June 30, 1996, Crugers and Montrose stations were closed, and the replacement Cortlandt station was opened. The two former stations provided a combined total of 150 parking spaces, and in 1991 received an average daily ridership of 332 passengers. In contrast, the new Cortlandt station opened with 750 parking spaces, and recorded an average morning peak ridership of 358 passengers in its first month. By Spring 1998, this ridership had grown to 580 passengers.

A bridge over the former station area still stands, but is currently closed to traffic.
