= Garrison station (Metro-North) =

Metro-North Railroad station in New York

Garrison
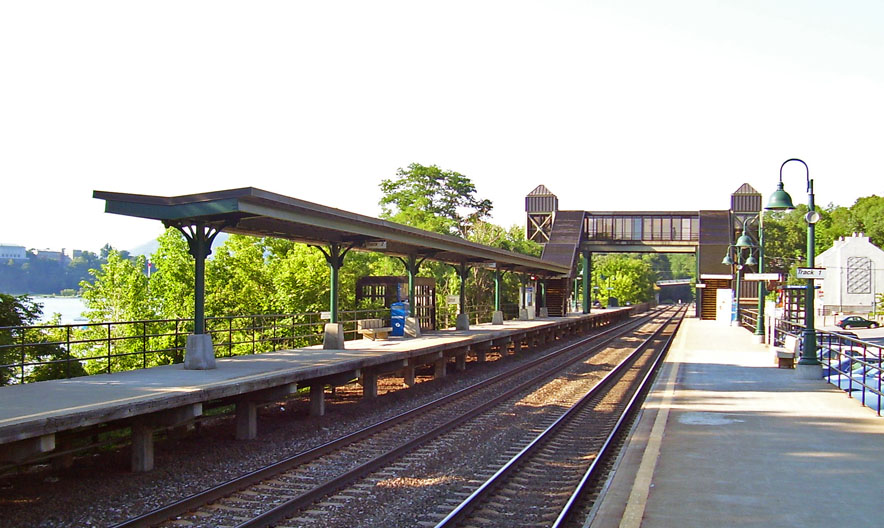
- Garrison Metro-North station

General information
- Location: 1 Upper Station Road, Garrison, New York
- Coordinates: 41.3828°N 73.9471°W
- Line: Hudson Line
- Platforms: 2 side platforms
- Tracks: 2

Construction
- Accessible: yes

Other information
- Fare zone: 7

Passengers
- 2018: 334 (Metro-North)
- Rank: 83 of 109

Services
Preceding station	Metro-North Railroad	Following station
Cold Spring toward Poughkeepsie	Hudson Line limited service	Manitou toward Grand Central
Cold Spring toward Poughkeepsie	Hudson Line	Peekskill toward Grand Central

Former services
Preceding station	New York Central Railroad	Following station
Cold Spring toward Chicago	Main Line	Manitou toward New York
Location

Garrison station is a commuter rail stop on the Metro-North Railroad's Hudson Line, located in Philipstown, New York.

== History ==
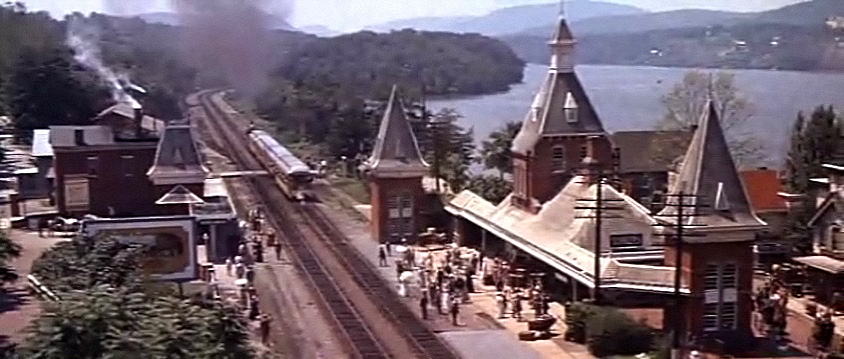
Screenshot from the trailer to Hello Dolly! using Garrison as 1890s Yonkers.

Rail service in Garrison can be traced as far back as the 1850s with the Hudson River Railroad. Prior to this, the only major transportation in the community was the ferry to West Point. Garrison Landing was built around the station, which, along with the line, was acquired by the New York Central and Hudson River Railroad (NYC&HR) in 1864, and like many others on the Hudson Line, it is also right on the Hudson River. In 1892, NYC&HR rebuilt the station with elements of the Italianate, Victorian Gothic and Hudson River Bracketed styles, similar to stations such as Dobbs Ferry. On October 24, 1897, the Garrison train crash occurred 1.75-mile (2.82 km) south of the station at Kings Dock, resulting in 19 deaths (mostly from drowning) and hundreds of injuries. A pedestrian tunnel was added to the station beneath the tracks in 1929. In April 1945, the station was a stop on the funeral train of Franklin D. Roosevelt, where West Pointers could pay tribute to the dead president as his body was transported to Hyde Park.

The station house became a Penn Central station upon the merger between NYC and Pennsylvania Railroad in 1968, like many NYCRR stations in Putnam County. Bankruptcy for Penn Central in 1970 forced them to turn passenger service over to the MTA in 1972, even through the period when it was taken over by Conrail in 1976, and then by Metro-North Railroad in 1983 which rebuilt a new station south of the former NYC station house. The former station house became a contributing property to the Garrison Landing Historic District in 1982, and has been the headquarters of the Philipstown Depot Theatre since 1996.

== In popular culture ==
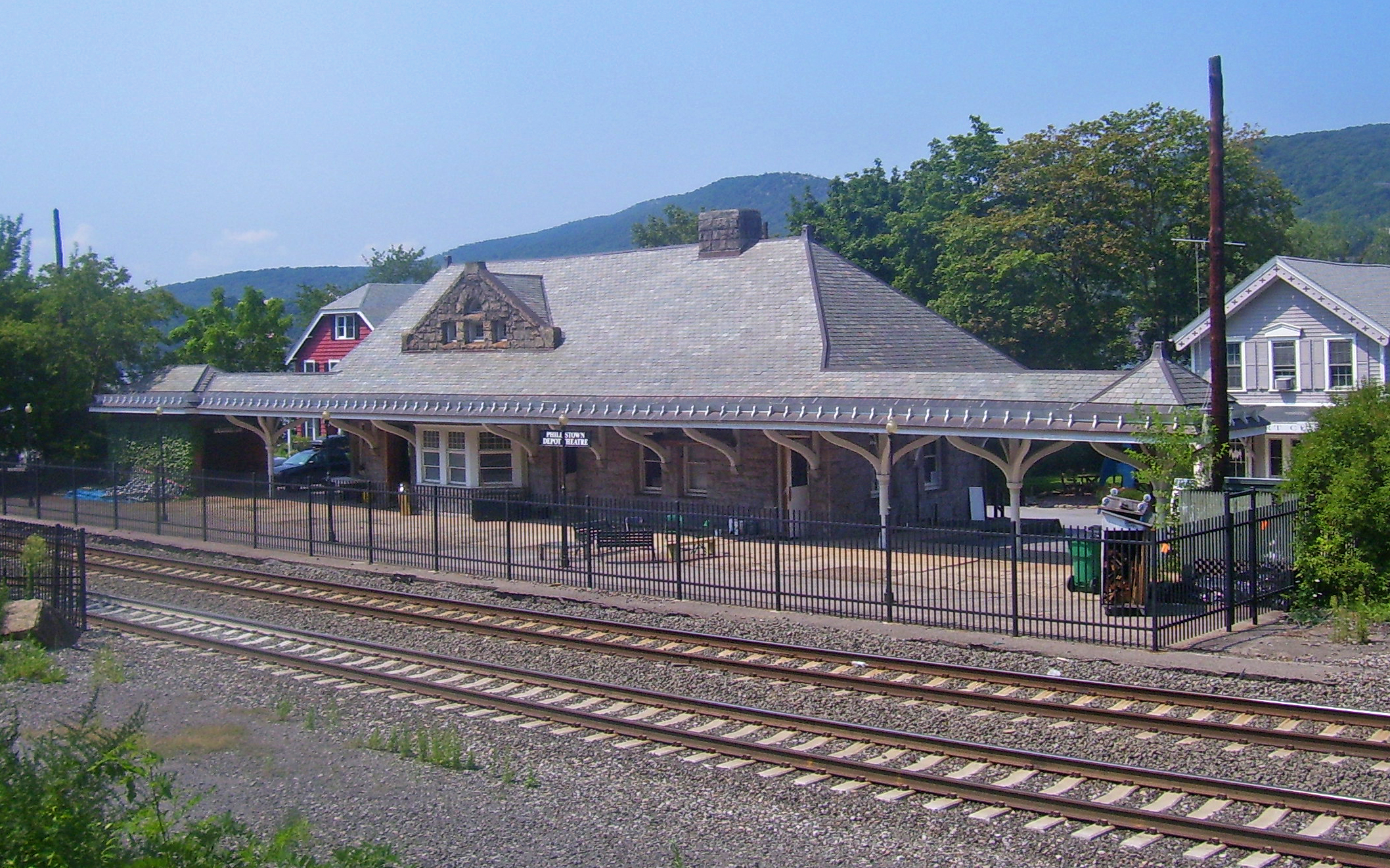
old Garrison Depot

The original Garrison Depot building (still standing just north of the current Metro-North station), the surrounding buildings, the overpass, and the tunnel just north of the depot were prominently seen in 1969 film Hello, Dolly! during the "Put On Your Sunday Clothes" number. The building was given some retro facade work and was "dressed up" as Yonkers, New York.

== Station layout ==
The station has two high-level side platforms each six cars long. The Garrison Landing Historic District is immediately to the northwest of the station.
