= Croton–Harmon station =

Train station in Croton-on-Hudson, New York, US

Croton–Harmon
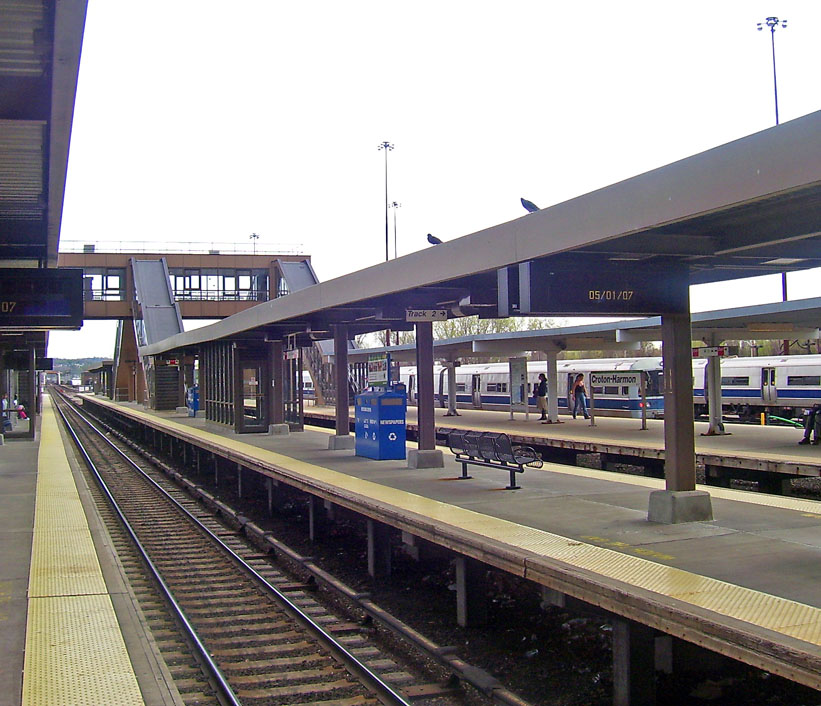
- Croton–Harmon station in 2007

General information
- Location: 1 Croton Point Avenue; Croton-on-Hudson, New York; United States
- Coordinates: 41.1898°N 73.8827°W
- Owner: Metro-North Railroad
- Line: Hudson Line
- Platforms: 3 island platforms
- Tracks: 4
- Connections: Bee-Line: 10, 11, 14

Construction
- Parking: 1,903 spaces
- Accessible: yes

Other information
- Station code: Amtrak: CRT; Via Rail: CROT
- Fare zone: 5 (Metro-North)

History
- Former names: Harmon (–April 28, 1963)

Passengers
- FY 2025: 61,926 (Amtrak)
- 2018: 4,811 (Metro-North)
- Rank: 6 of 109

Services
Preceding station	Amtrak	Following station
Poughkeepsie toward Montreal	Adirondack	Yonkers toward New York
Poughkeepsie toward Pittsfield	Berkshire Flyer (seasonal)	Yonkers toward New York
Poughkeepsie toward Niagara Falls, New York	Empire Service	Yonkers toward New York
Poughkeepsie toward Burlington	Ethan Allen Express	Yonkers toward New York
Poughkeepsie toward Toronto	Maple Leaf	Yonkers toward New York
Poughkeepsie toward Chicago	Lake Shore Limited	New York Terminus
Preceding station	Metro-North Railroad	Following station
Cortlandt toward Poughkeepsie	Hudson Line	Harlem–125th Street toward Grand Central
Terminus	Hudson Line	Ossining toward Grand Central
Former services
Preceding station	Metro-North Railroad	Following station
Crugers closed 1996 toward Poughkeepsie	Hudson Line	Ossining toward Grand Central
Preceding station	Amtrak	Following station
Poughkeepsie toward Chicago	Lake Shore	New York (Grand Central) Terminus
Poughkeepsie toward Detroit (Michigan Central)	Niagara Rainbow	New York (Grand Central) Terminus
Preceding station	New York Central Railroad	Following station
Peekskill toward Chicago	Main Line	Ossining toward New York
Croton North toward Peekskill	Hudson Division	Ossining toward New York
Location

Croton–Harmon station (/kroʊtɪnhɑːrmɪn/) is a train station in Croton-on-Hudson, New York. It serves the Metro-North Railroad's Hudson Line and all Amtrak trains running along the Empire Corridor. It is the main transfer point between the Hudson Line's local and express service and marks the northern endpoint of third-rail electrification on the route.

Nearly all electric trains running on the Hudson Line originate and terminate here, though a handful of peak-direction rush hour trains do so further south at Greystone, Irvington, or Tarrytown. As the line's electrification ends just north of the station, trains traveling to or from points north (primarily the northern terminus, Poughkeepsie) are powered by dual-mode (electric/diesel) GE P32AC-DM and Siemens SC-42DM locomotives.

== History ==
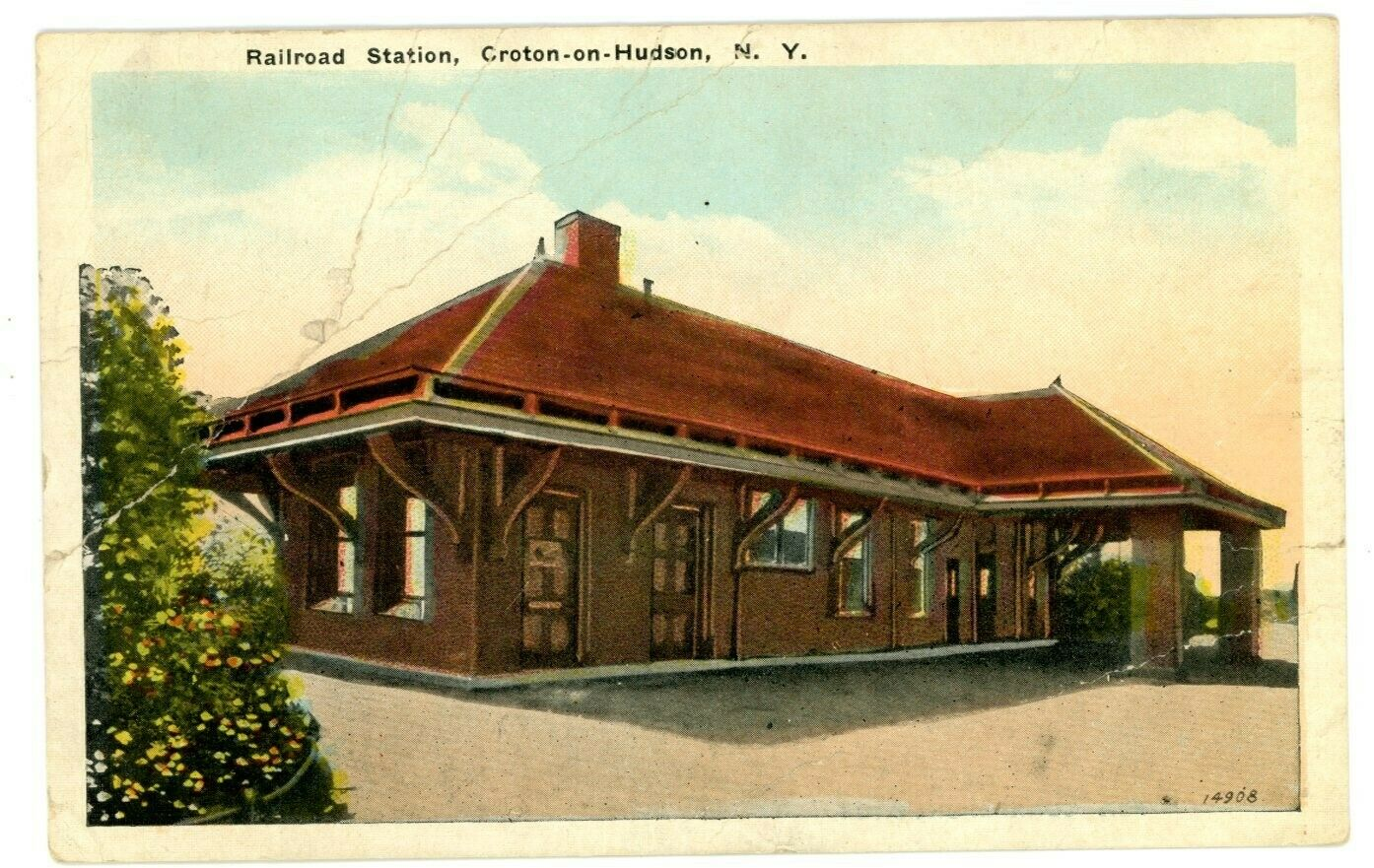
A postcard of the station

The Hudson River Railroad, one of the forerunners of the New York Central Railroad, ran commuter trains to Poughkeepsie via Croton-on-Hudson as early as 1849. However, little is known of what became of earlier stations. The present station dates from the late 1950s, and was expanded to a multi-level facility in 1988.

Named after Clifford B. Harmon (as a condition of his donating the land for the station), the station was known as simply Harmon until April 1963. Trains continuing north of Harmon, including the flagship 20th Century Limited, would exchange their electric locomotive for a steam or diesel locomotive to continue the journey to points north and west.

As of August 2006, daily commuter ridership was 3368 and there are 1903 parking spots.

The Berkshire Flyer began running on July 8, 2022, providing direct service to Pittsfield on summer weekends.

== Station layout ==
The village of Croton-on-Hudson operates the station parking lot. A great number of spots are reserved for long-term permit holders and village residents. There is also ample parking for daily use.

The station has three high-level island platforms, each 10 cars long.
