= Cortlandt station =

Metro-North Railroad station in New York

Cortlandt
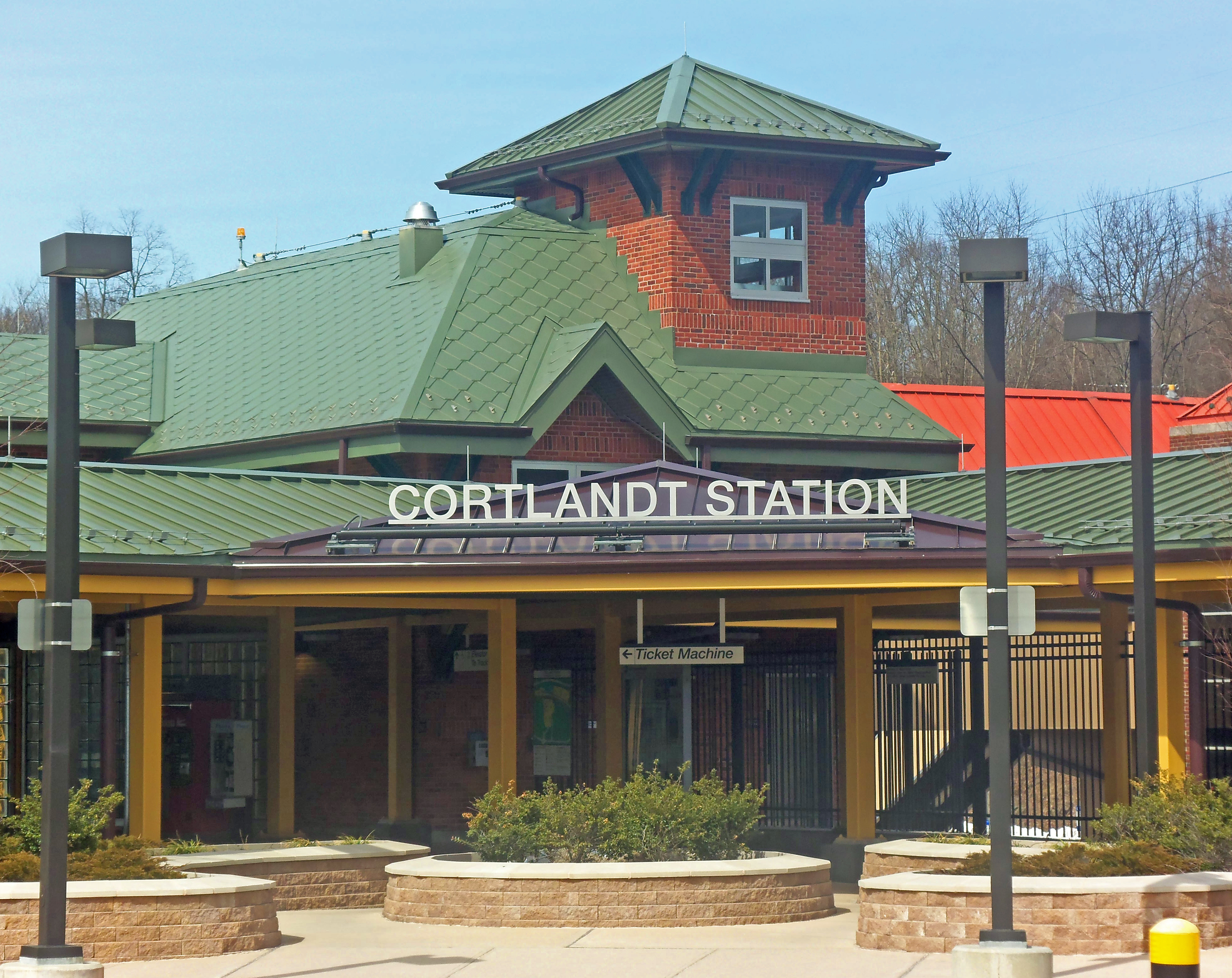
- Entrance to the new station building

General information
- Location: 2 Memorial Drive, Montrose, New York
- Coordinates: 41°14′49″N 73°55′24″W
- Line: Hudson Line
- Platforms: 1 island platform
- Tracks: 3
- Connections: Bee-Line Bus System: 14

Construction
- Parking: 886 spaces
- Accessible: yes

Other information
- Fare zone: 6

History
- Opened: June 30, 1996

Passengers
- 2018: 1,225 (Metro-North)
- Rank: 48 of 109

Services
Preceding station	Metro-North Railroad	Following station
Peekskill toward Poughkeepsie	Hudson Line	Croton–Harmon toward Grand Central
Location

Cortlandt station is a commuter rail stop on the Metro-North Railroad's Hudson Line, located in Montrose, New York. Trains leave for New York City every hour on weekdays, and about every 25 minutes during rush hour. It is 38.4 miles (61.8 km) from Grand Central Terminal and travel time to Grand Central is about 62 minutes.

== History ==
Cortlandt is the second newest station on the Hudson Line (and seventh-newest on the Metro-North system). The station replaced the low-level Montrose and Crugers stations at a point midway between them on June 30, 1996. Those stations were replaced as part of the last stage of expanding the Hudson Line to six-car high-level platforms. They could not be extended because of the curvature of their platforms. Cortlandt is the first station north of Croton–Harmon, where electrification begins southbound.

On February 15, 2012, Metro-North completed the expansion project of the station. The new facility includes an overpass extension that ties the original station east of the tracks with a new entrance on the west side off NY 9A near the VA Hospital, new parking and a landscaped, canopy-covered, intermodal drop-off plaza. The new overpass has a spacious, heated waiting area with numerous benches and a coffee concession.

== Station layout ==
The station has one six-car-long high-level island platform.
