= Manitou station =

Metro-North Railroad station in New York

Manitou
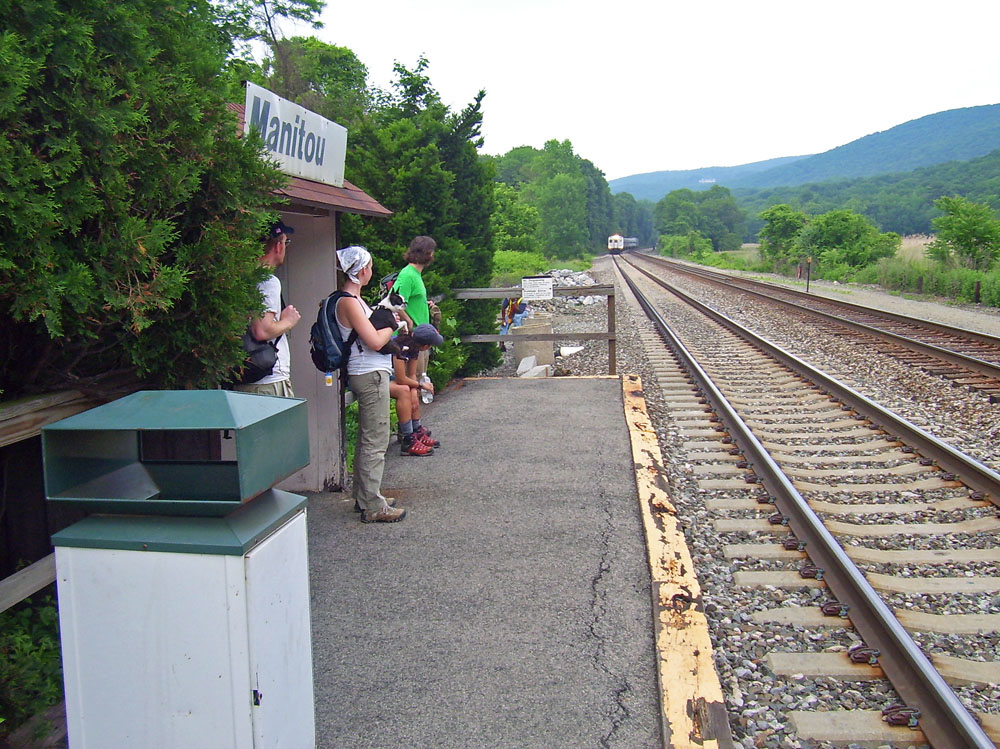
- Hikers returning from the Bear Mountain area await a New York City-bound train at the Manitou station.

General information
- Location: 1 Manitou Road, Garrison, New York
- Coordinates: 41.3324°N 73.9709°W
- Line: Hudson Line
- Platforms: 2 side platforms
- Tracks: 2

Other information
- Fare zone: 7

Passengers
- 2018: 30 per week

Services
Preceding station	Metro-North Railroad	Following station
Garrison toward Poughkeepsie	Hudson Line limited service	Peekskill toward Grand Central

Former services
Preceding station	New York Central Railroad	Following station
Garrison toward Chicago	Main Line	Peekskill toward New York
Location

Manitou station (/mænɪtuː/ MAN-ih-TOO) is a commuter railroad station in the town of Philipstown in Putnam County, New York. Named after the hamlet of Manitou where it is located, the stop services trains of Metro-North Railroad's Hudson Line. Manitou station is a limited service stop, one of two on the Hudson Line, along with Breakneck Ridge in the town of Fishkill. Both stations serve as stops for local hikers. Appalachian Trail station on the Harlem Line also serves this purpose. Manitou station is a two side platform station located at the crossing of Manitou Road. The station has seven inbound trains stop on weekends toward Grand Central Terminal and six outbound trains on the way to Poughkeepsie station. This station is the least used station in Putnam County, with only 42 passengers per week in 2018.

== History ==
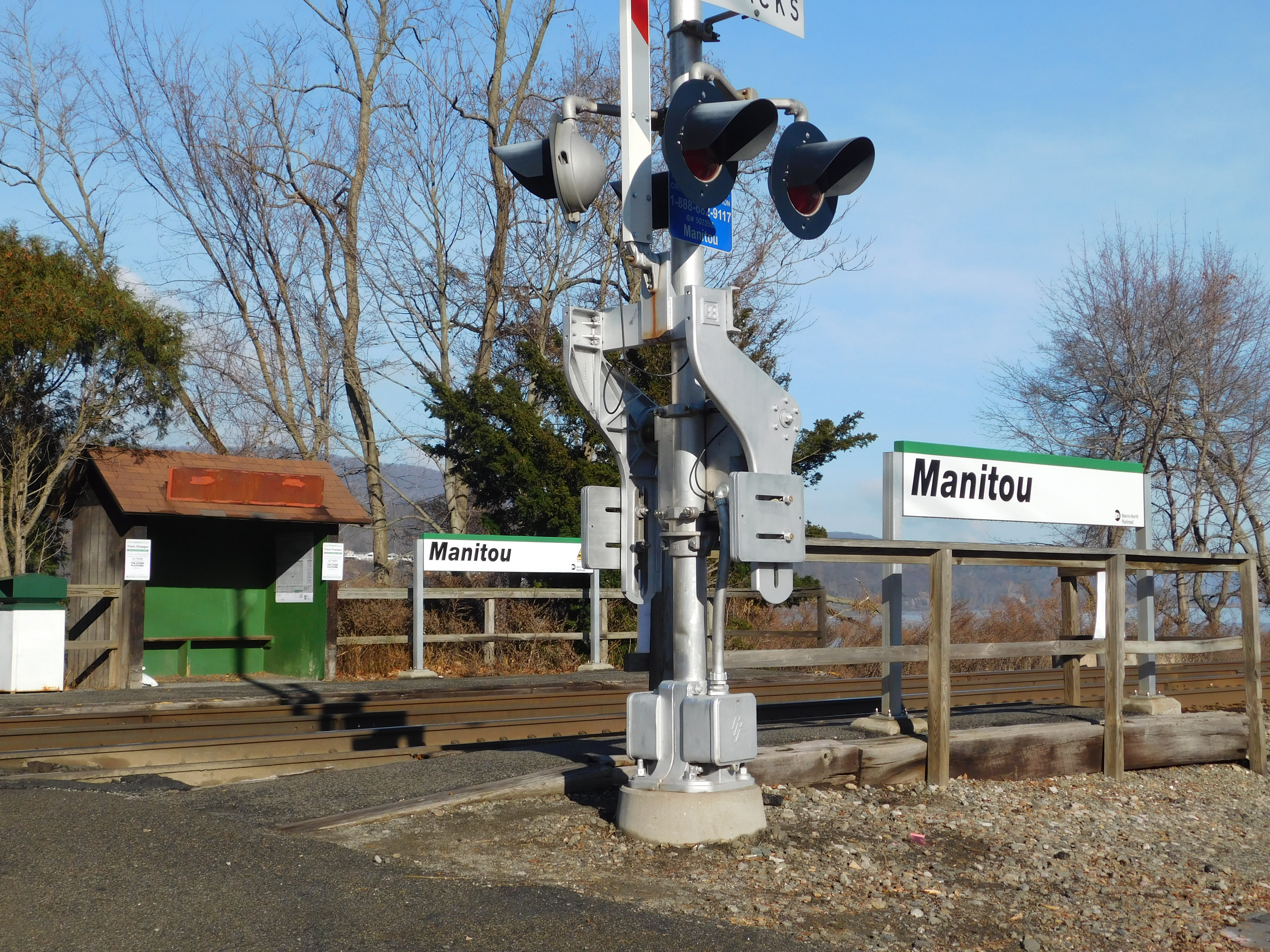
Manitou station in December 2018

In November 1972, a local development company offered to build a project at Manitou station on the Edward Swinburne property. This new development would build 630 condominium units on 125 acres (51 ha) of land between Route 9D and the Hudson River and have a v-shape design built into the hillside to prevent visibility from both sides. The new development would also build a new train station at Manitou, which would require a zoning ordinance from the town of Philipstown. The project's developers also wanted an assessment on the property that would create a tax decrease.

Residents were skeptical of the new project and the benefits to the area, with locals in Philipstown showing opposition at a hearing on November 1. Numerous residents gave oppositional statements at the hearing and talked about the increase of traffic and possible crime that would come with a new condominium complex. The Phillipstown Planning Board and Putnam County Planning Board had already rejected the project on lack of access for cars and necessary facilities. The Philipstown Town Board followed with their rejection on December 28, 1972.

In June 1973, Penn Central Railroad announced they would discontinue 34 trains and four stations on the Hudson Division. Manitou, along with the stops at Oscawana, Chelsea and New Hamburg, were to be discontinued on July 2. The stations officially closed that day.

== Station layout ==
The station has two short low-level side platforms, which are each long enough for just one door of one car to receive and discharge passengers.

== In popular culture ==
The Manitou station was featured in the television series Girls, in the episode "Video Games," in which Lena Dunham's character Hannah accompanies Jessa on a visit to her estranged father.
