= Troy and Greenbush Railroad =

Former railroad company in New York

Overview
- Parent company: Hudson River Railroad (1851–1869); New York Central and Hudson River Railroad (1869–1914); New York Central Railroad (1914–1968); Penn Central Transportation (1968–1976)
- Dates of operation: 1845–1976
- Successor: Conrail

Technical
- Track gauge: 1,435 mm (4 ft 8 1/2 in)
- Length: 5.5 miles (8.9 km)

The Troy and Greenbush Railroad, formally the Troy and Greenbush Railroad Association, was a railway company in the United States. It was incorporated in 1845 and completed a line that same year between Troy, New York, and Greenbush, New York, across the Hudson River from Albany, New York. It was leased by the Hudson River Railroad, a predecessor of the New York Central Railroad, in 1851. It remained a lessee through the Penn Central Transportation merger and was conveyed to Conrail in 1976.

== History ==
The Troy and Greenbush Railroad Association was incorporated on May 14, 1845. Unusually, the railroad was already almost complete, with construction between Troy, New York, and Greenbush, New York, having begun in December 1844. Operation began on June 12, 1845. The northern end of the line was at Washington Street in Troy, where it connected with the tracks of the Troy and Boston Railroad. Other railroads operating in Troy at the time included the Rensselaer and Saratoga Railroad, which owned a bridge over the Hudson River, and the Schenectady and Troy Railroad, which used the former's bridge.

In Greenbush, the Troy and Greenbush connected with the Albany and West Stockbridge Railroad. The Hudson River Railroad, building north from New York City, leased the Troy and Greenbush Railroad on June 1, 1851, and completed its line between New York City and Greenbush on October 1.

The Troy and Greenbush continued to exist on paper until April 1, 1976, when its property was conveyed to Conrail following the bankruptcy of Penn Central Transportation. The majority of the line still exists and belongs to CSX Transportation.
