= Cold Spring station (Metro-North) =

Metro-North Railroad station in New York

Cold Spring
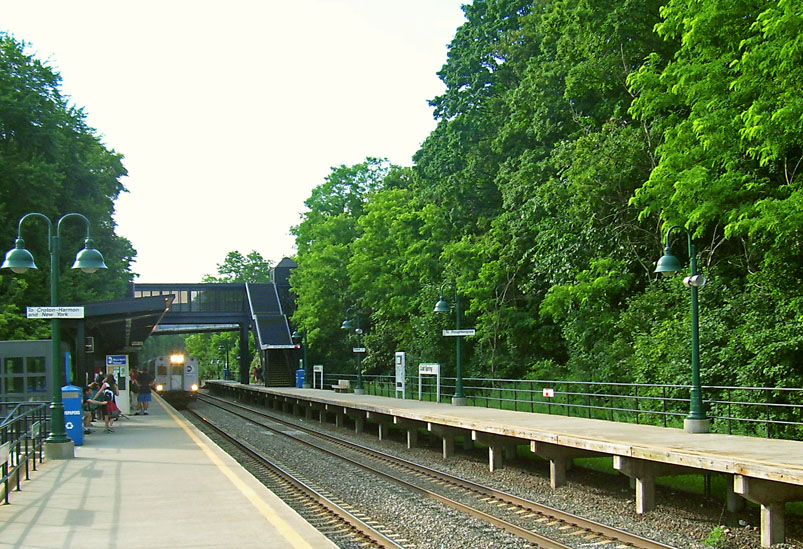
- Southbound Metro-North train arriving at Cold Spring.

General information
- Location: Market Street, Cold Spring, New York
- Coordinates: 41.4152°N 73.9585°W
- Line: Hudson Line
- Platforms: 2 side platforms
- Tracks: 2
- Connections: Putnam Transit: Cold Spring Trolley

Construction
- Parking: 223 spaces
- Accessible: yes

Other information
- Fare zone: 7

Passengers
- 2018: 528 (Metro-North)
- Rank: 72 of 109

Services
Preceding station	Metro-North Railroad	Following station
Breakneck Ridge toward Poughkeepsie	Hudson Line limited service	Garrison toward Grand Central
Beacon toward Poughkeepsie	Hudson Line	Garrison toward Grand Central

Former services
Preceding station	New York Central Railroad	Following station
Storm King toward Chicago	Main Line	Garrison toward New York
Location

Cold Spring station is a commuter rail stop on the Metro-North Railroad's Hudson Line, located in Cold Spring, New York.

== History ==
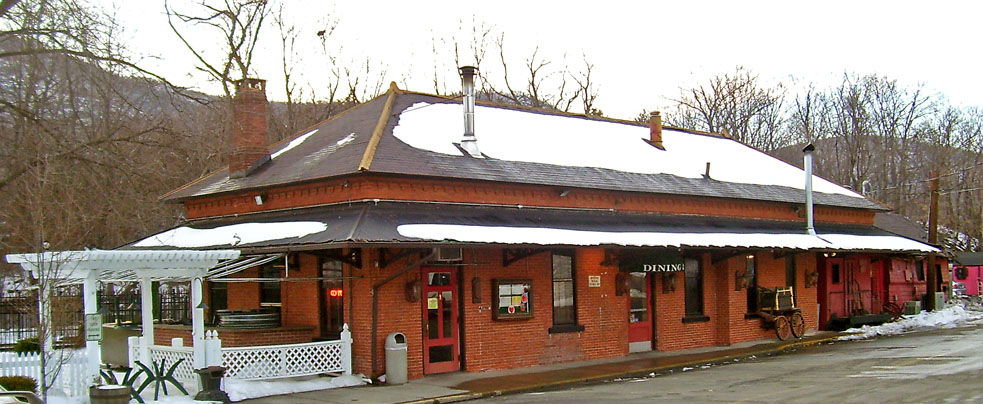
The old station, now a local restaurant called, "The Cold Spring Depot"

The Hudson River Railroad was built through Cold Spring in 1851 in order to expand the Troy and Greenbush Railroad from the Albany area to New York City. HRR was acquired by the New York Central Railroad in 1864, which also built a depot here in 1893. A pedestrian tunnel was added in 1929 connecting the two sections of Main Street, and a road bridge over the tracks was built in 1930, but the station was closed to passengers in 1954, despite remaining in use.

As with all stations along the Hudson Line, it was converted into a Penn Central Railroad station upon the merger of NYC with Pennsylvania Railroad in 1968. Bankruptcy for Penn Central in 1970 forced them to turn passenger service over to the MTA in 1972, the same year that the former station house was converted into a restaurant after spending 18 years as a car dealership.

MTA control of passenger service continued through the period when it was taken over by Conrail in 1976, and then by Metro-North Railroad in 1983. Cold Spring station was one of the last stations within the system to be rebuilt and relocated with high-level platforms, a pedestrian bridge, and elevators. The former station house is within the boundaries of the Cold Spring Historic District. The current Cold Spring station is located slightly south of the old one, still standing at the foot of Cold Spring's Main Street. Walkways on both sides of the tracks connect the old and new station, and the pedestrian tunnel built by New York Central Railroad is still in use by both commuters and local residents.

== Station layout ==
The station has two high-level side platforms each six cars long.

== Notable places nearby ==
- Chuang Yen Monastery
- Hudson Highlands
- Storm King Mountain
