= Montrose station (Metro-North) =

Metro-North Railroad station in New York

Montrose
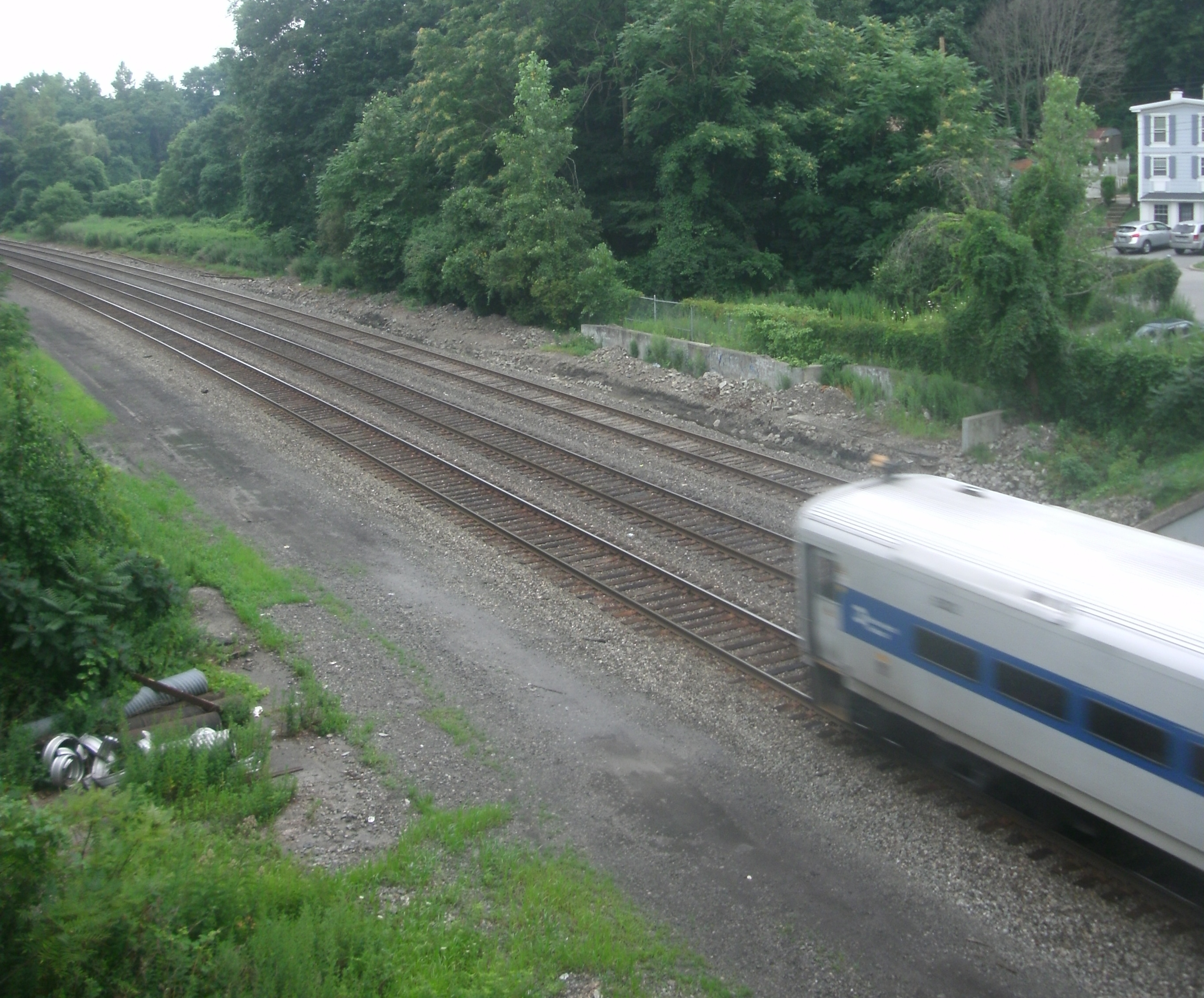
- The former Montrose station as seen in 2011, 15 years after its closure, with a Metro-North train bound for Poughkeepsie visible.

General information
- Location: Victoria Avenue at Montrose Station Road, Montrose, Cortlandt, New York
- Coordinates: 41°15′10″N 73°55′41″W
- System: Former Metro-North Hudson Line station
- Line: Empire Corridor
- Platforms: 2 low-level side platforms
- Tracks: 3 tracks

Construction
- Parking: 102 parking spaces

History
- Closed: June 30, 1996

Former services
Preceding station	Metro-North Railroad	Following station
Peekskill toward Poughkeepsie	Hudson Line	Crugers toward Grand Central
Preceding station	New York Central Railroad	Following station
Peekskill Terminus	Hudson Division	Crugers toward New York
Location

Montrose station was a station on the Metro-North Railroad's Hudson Line, serving the hamlet of Montrose, New York. It closed in 1996 when it and the next station southbound, Crugers, were replaced by the Cortlandt station between them. The station, isolated and lightly used, and Crugers station were replaced as part of the last stage of expanding the Hudson Line to six-car high-level platforms. Together, they recorded 332 riders in the morning peak in 1991. While they could be converted to high-level platforms, there was no space to lengthen the platforms or provide expanded parking because the station was surrounded by protected wetlands as well as a bridge abutment adjacent to the station prohibiting such expansion. The station had 102 parking spaces for commuter usage. The station closed on June 30, 1996.

== History ==
=== Rampant growth and parking problems (1987–1990) ===
Growth in the area around Montrose station reached a breaking point in 1987 when it came to commuters parking to catch the train. Montrose station, which lacked proper parking facilities, had people parking on side streets in the area, leading to local ire. Between 6:00 a.m. and 7:00 p.m. on weekdays, over 100 cars would park along Montrose Station Road, blocking or impeding driveways and drawing concerns over accessibility in emergencies. The locals stated that there was not an obvious agency in charge to make changes, with questions of property line and property ownership. Due to the questions of ownership, parkers were not ticketed for parking in areas marked not to. The Cortlandt Town Engineer, James Irish, noted that they would have to do surveys when they could find the time to sort out property ownership between the town of Cortlandt, the railroad and local residents.

By September 1987, residents of Victoria Avenue, one of the streets affected by the parking problems, met with officials from Metro-North Commuter Railroad to find a solution for the prevalent parking problems. Supervisor Charles DiGiacomo and Police Chief Robert Pavone told the press from the small parking lot at Montrose station that they would have a new solution soon. DiGiacomo announced that the municipality would begin construction of a new parking lot at the western terminus of Montrose Station Road, a distance of 0.5-mile (0.80 km) away from the station platforms. This new free parking lot, which would accommodate 80 commuter vehicles, would be for exclusive use of those who lived in Cortlandt. The town would also go a step further and make Victoria Avenue limited to parking in one direction, not both directions, to reduce the risk of emergency issues.

Gannett Westchester Newspapers learned in early October 1987 that the railroad would begin studies and discussion on building a new station between Crugers station and Montrose station in the town of Cortlandt. Their initial choice would be a 6-acre (2.4 ha) location between U.S. Route 9 and New York State Route 9A that would serve as the new station. The station would be able to service over 2,000 vehicles, larger than the number at the two smaller stations. The property was owned at the time by Trumid Construction, a firm in Elmsford. For the proposed station, the town of Cortlandt would buy the land from Trumid and operate their own municipal parking facility. By December, the property negotiations had gone from 6 acres (2.4 ha) to 23 acres (9.3 ha). The railroad had been doing the negotiations, with an official announcement supposed to come in November, but due to the curve in the trackage at the property, Metro-North decided that they needed to do more research because the station would have vision issues in each direction from oncoming trains. Metro-North stated that they would determine whether to go ahead with the project until at least the Spring of 1988.

The town of Cortlandt went forward with its plan to reduce allowed parking on Victoria Avenue on the night of February 2, 1988. With an unanumous vote, parking along Victoria would be banned on the western side of the road from Montrose Station Road to Route 9A. A second vote, banning parking along the northern side of Montrose Station Road from Oak Lane to Route 9A, passed with one dissenting vote. Locals cheered on the bans while some commuters complained about the bind the bans would put them in. DiGiacomo, listening to the complaints stated that the town owned parking lot on Montrose Station Road was still on the table, along with a possible leasing of the Montrose Fire Department's parking lot to help commuters. DiGiacomo stated that the Fire Department lease could be done by March and that they were sympathetic that parking was tough, but that local studies backed the concerns about safety of emergency vehicles and school buses navigating the two streets. DiGiacomo added that they would also considering adding pressure to build the new station in the town of Cortlandt.

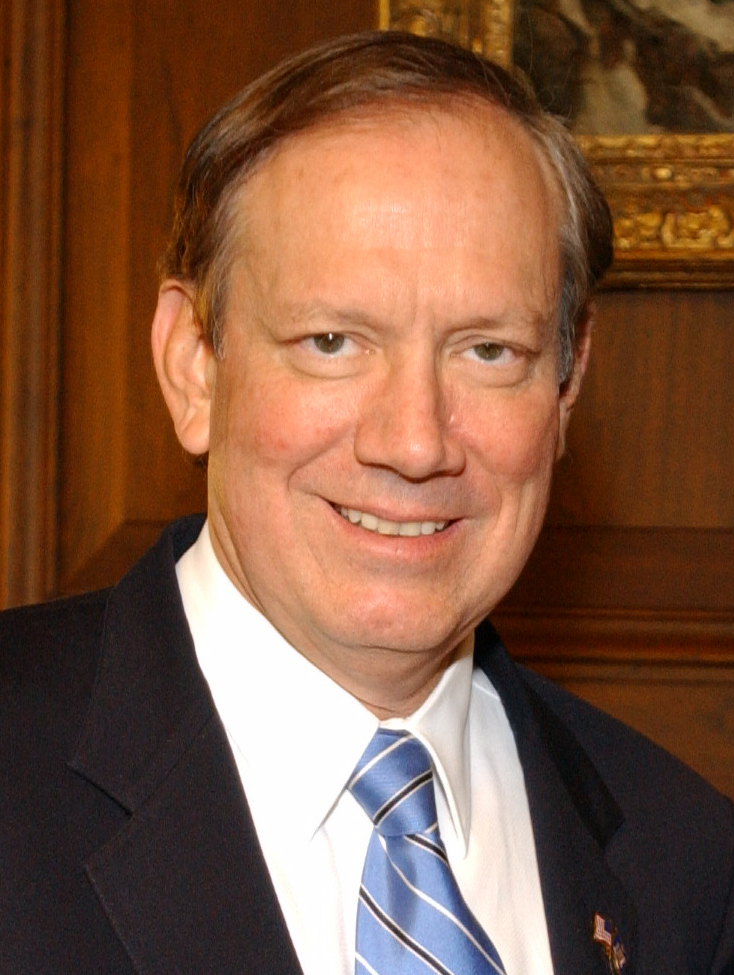
George Pataki, at the time an Assemblyman in Westchester County, advocated for the construction of a new station

New York State Assemblyman George Pataki (R–Peekskill) told Gannett Westchester Newspapers ten days later that a decision to build a new station in the town of Cortlandt would be determined before the end of the month. Metro-North Railroad officials told the news that they were still working on multiple sites for a possible station, the Trumid Property and one along Crugers Station Road near Route 9A. The one on Crugers Station Road would be smaller than the Trumid property, with only 1-acre (0.40 ha) along the tracks. Pataki stated that he supported a new station and elimination of Montrose and Crugers to help commuters and reduce the ire of locals.

The plans for Cortlandt to lease the Montrose Fire Department property ran into issues by May 1988. The Fire Department asked the municipality for $25,000 in rent per year, improvement and regular maintenance of the property and a stipulation that parking would only be limited to weekdays. The three-year lease would also require the 0.5-acre (0.20 ha) lot to be closed during the summer bazaar, held annually in Montrose. The deal would have to be negotiatied, as the municipality felt that the $25,000 in rent and request for capital improvements was too much. At the same time, a retired businessman from Bedford offered to use some of his 11-acre (4.5 ha) property to build a new parking lot at Montrose station. William Berens, a swimming pool manufacturer, offered that he would like to clear his property and sell it to either the municipality or the railroad to operate a new parking lot.

Negotiations with the Montrose Volunteer Fire Department were continuing into June 1988, with both sides noting progress and that when the municipality is ready to use it, the parking lot would be available. At that point, DiGiacomo stated that building a new station in Cortlandt would be better for all parties involved. DiGiacomo and Metro-North spokesperson Dan Bruckner told the press that they were now looking at three different properties for the new station: the two previous ones and a third one at the site of the Sandport asphalt plant, located off Route 9A. DiGiacomo added that the Montrose and Crugers stations would be closed and that a new deal could occur within weeks.

In March 1989, officials from Metro-North informed the Cortlandt Town Board that they chose the Trumid property for the new station. The new station would also come with a 600-space parking lot. Now co-owned by Unicorn Industries of Peekskill, the $5 million station would also come with a $35 million housing development. Unicorn officials noted that a new train station would bring people who would want to live in range. They stated that they hoped to construct 80,000 square feet (7,400 m^{2}) of commercial space along with upwards of 80 condominiums and apartments.

On June 22, 1990, the Metropolitan Transportation Authority announced that they would purchase the land for a new station in the town of Cortlandt. The land would include 0.25 acres (0.10 ha) and an easement for a connection to Route 9A at the cost of $134,504. They also approved a deal with Route 9 Commercial Ventures to provide 650 parking spaces on a 9-acre (3.6 ha) section of the property. Citing that Crugers and Montrose had seen ridership grow 85% in a period from 1982 to 1989, the new station would replace the 140 spaces the two older stops provided.

By the time of the June 1990 announcement, the deal with the Montrose Volunteer Fire Department had yet to be completed. New Town Supervisor Jack Gaffney noted that they were working with the company for the parking lot to help commuters. He added that the fire department would get $1,000 per month for leasing the lot, which would come from selling monthly parking permits that would range from $25–$30 per spot. Pavone added at a meeting on June 19 that the police department starting ticketing cars on local streets when complaints were filed but Gaffney stated that they did not want to see police enforcing it until alternate parking was provided. If a deal is made, Crugers Avenue and Ripley place would see an immediate uptick in enforcement.

The municipality and the fire department agreed to a deal by August 1990. Despite complaints by commuters via a petition, the township announced that they would eliminate free parking for commuters at a municipality-owned lot on Kings Ferry Road. The Kings Ferry Road lot would be reduced to two hours per use except for those using the local library. Those people would be allowed to buy permits for the new parking lot across from the Montrose Fire Department, which had 60 spaces available. Several streets near Crugers station would also be banned from commuter parking period. With a Town Board vote planned for August 21, the expectation is that the new lots would be in use by October 1990.

By September 1990, the town began advertising for permits for the new parking lot on Montrose Station Road. Leases began of the lot on October 1. However, the lot proved to be a failure for the town as the town approved closing the new lot on November 8. The lot was only producing at only half-capacity, resulting in a loss for the town financially. Town Attorney Tom Wood added that if they did not break the lease, the town would be violating laws in terms of subsidizing some residents.

=== Closure (1992–1996) ===
The town of Cortlandt and the Metropolitan Transportation Authority came to a parking agreement in October 1992 that would include the town maintaining the parking lot. The railroad would pay $375,000 for the new station site, where they would build a six car high-level platform with a shelter. The first 5% of revenue would go to repairs over $7,500 while the rest of the revenue parking from the new station would be split between the railroad and municipality equally. One proposed name thrown out at the time would be Montrose–Crugers, resulting in a comment by an MTA official that vandals would replace Montrose with Freddy, referring to the fictional villain Freddy Krueger. However, a final decision on the name would be made by the railroad with advice from the municipality.

After public hearings were held in July 1993, Metro-North officials stated that they would not change plans for replacing Montrose and Crugers stations, despite concerns of extra traffic on Route 9A. The new lot would start at 400 parking spaces, with right to expand to 550 spaces if demand requires it. If the town gave permission, it would also be able to reach 720 or even 1000 parking spaces via a parking garage. Rail fares at the new station would be the same as Montrose and Crugers and that four minutes would be cut form the schedule by merging the two stops. The railroad announced they hope they would break ground on the new station in early 1994 and finish it by 1995.

Town Supervisor Linda Puglisi and Geoffrey Dopsch, the Senior Capital Projects Engineer for Metro-North Railroad announced in October 1994 that construction would begin on the new station in November 1994. Now named Cortlandt, the new station would replace Montrose and Crugers, which would both be dismantled by the railroad. The construction of the new station would also lead to improvements on Route 9A to facilitate new traffic. Groundbreaking for the new Cortlandt station occurred on November 17, 1994 for the $10.9 million project, which had a slated completion date in 1996.

Metro-North Railroad announced the new station would open on June 30, 1996, marking the closure of Crugers and Montrose stations, a decision cheered by residents near both stations, who had been dealing with parking issues since growth in the area occurred. The first train arrived during the afternoon of June 30 with a ceremony held on the new platform. Montrose and Crugers stations were simultaneously closed.
