= Standard House =

- U.S. National Register of Historic Places
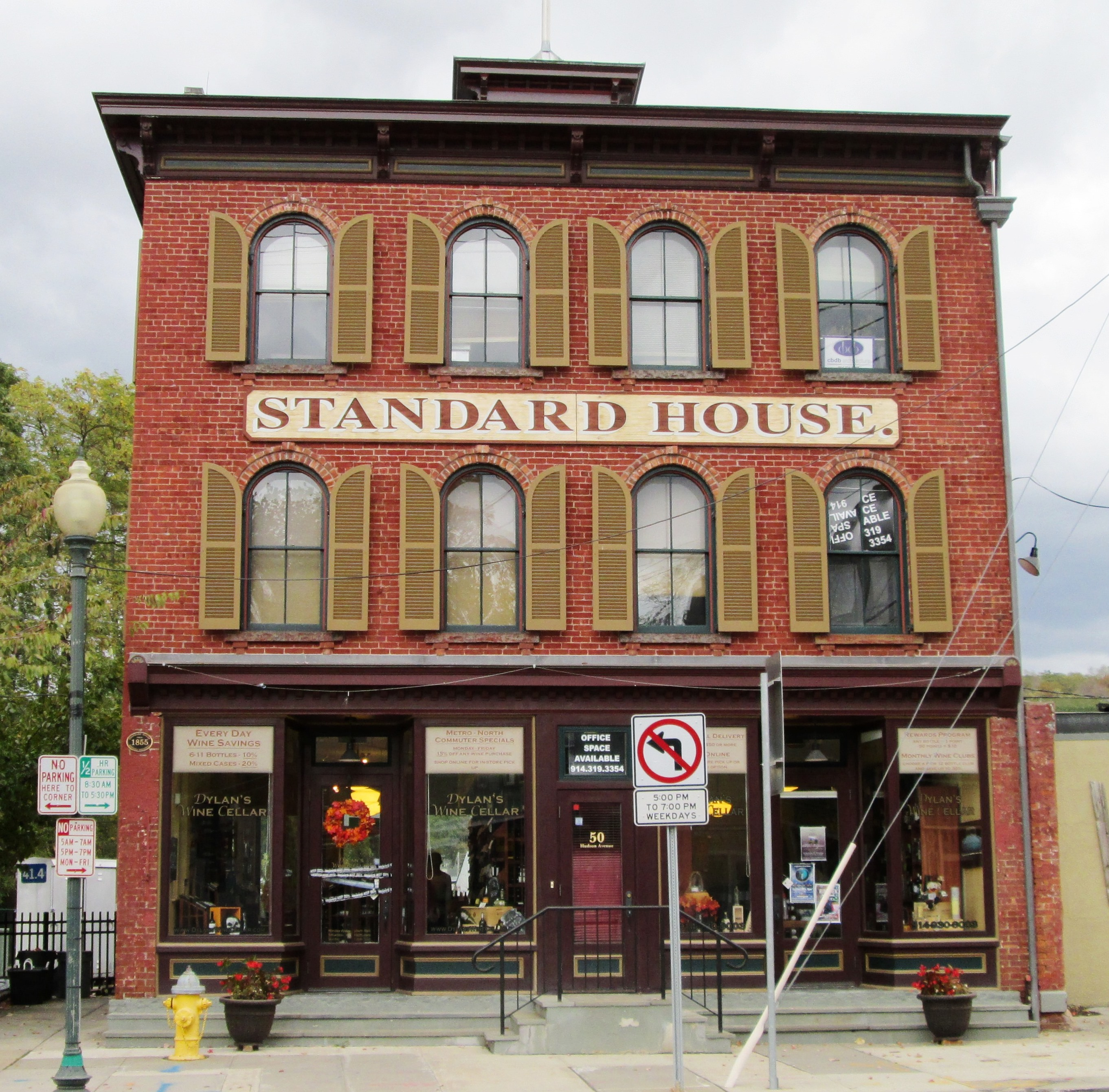
- (2014)
- Location: 50 Hudson Avenue; Peekskill, New York
- Coordinates: 41°17′09″N 73°55′49″W
- Area: less than one acre
- Built: c.1855
- Architectural style: Italianate
- NRHP reference No.: 00001158
- Added to NRHP: September 22, 2000

The Standard House is a landmark in the city of Peekskill in Westchester County, New York, built in 1855. It is located at 50 Hudson Avenue between South Water Street and the Metro-North Hudson Line train tracks.

An Italianate brick building, it and the Union Hotel across the street are the only two hotel buildings remaining from the period of Peekskill's industrial height as a center for the manufacture of stoves. It continued to be in use as a hotel after that industry declined, but couldn't survive the decline of the railroad in the mid-20th century. Vacant and neglected through most of the later years of that century, it was restored early in the next. In 2000 it was listed on the National Register of Historic Places. Currently it houses a retail store on the ground floor, and the city's economic development offices.

== Building ==
The building's small lot is flat, reflecting the nearby Hudson River. The fenced-off tracks are on its west; it shares a party wall with another commercial building to the east. To its north is a vacated section of the former West Street, the only fragment of Peekskill's once yellow-brick paved streets remaining in the city.

The Standard House is a three-story painted brick building, four bays by three, with a shallow-pitched pyramidal roof covered in bitumen roll topped by a central cupola with a flagpole on top. Two brick chimneys rise from the western corners. The south (front) elevation of the first story has two glass storefronts, topped by a wooden cornice. All four windows on both upper stories are round-arched with louvered shutters, brick keystones and a stone sill supported by corbeled brick. "STANDARD HOUSE" is prominently painted on a wooden panel between the second and third stories.

The roofline has a dentilled wooden box cornice, with molding and brackets above a paneled frieze. The cupola has roofing and trim similar to the rest of the building. Some past fire damage is still visible at its southwest corner.

Inside, the first floor has been completely gutted and rebuilt. Only the original wood siding and window framing on the west wall remain. The two upper stories have their original plans intact as well as most of their original finishings.

== History ==
Built in approximately 1855, it was originally used as a boarding house and tavern, catering to the busy traffic in the industrial area of the city near the New York Central railroad and the Hudson River. The name "Standard House" is not associated with the property until a photo taking during the Blizzard of 1888 shows the name on the facade between the second and third stories as it appears today.

The origins of the name are unclear. Theories that have been advanced suggest a connection to William Jennings Bryan. The first concerns The Standard, a society newspaper published in New York and London during the 1890s. Issues with articles highlighting Bryan and Chauncey Depew, a Peekskill native, were found in the building during its restoration. At that time, the owner, John Galligan, was a staunch supporter of Bryan and bimetallism A local newspaper photo taken of Bryan campaigning from the railroad station during the 1908 presidential election shows the Standard House prominently in the background. A photo in the same newspaper of William Howard Taft speaking at the same spot two days later was taken from a different angle that does not show the building at all.

Throughout the early 20th century, the Standard House passed through several other owners.

One of the owners in early 1900s was Michael J Kelly who owned and operated the establishment as a hotel and cafe. His family also lived in the building. Kelly sold the building in the early days of Prohibition.

At the outset of Prohibition, a man named John Carbone bought it and turned it into a successful restaurant, restoring liquor service after Prohibition's repeal. While the industry around Peekskill's waterfront declined, Carbone's remained successful, but the building was neglected by subsequent ownership, which renamed it the Central Grill. After suffering severe fire damage, the building was boarded up and left to deteriorate further while the city pursued a foreclosure action against its owners for unpaid property taxes.

In 1998, the building was purchased by Kathy and Rick Cerreta, longtime city residents with an interest in historic preservation. They spent heavily on restoring the structure, rebuilding its wooden windows instead of merely replacing them. In 2000 it was added to the National Register of Historic Places. They reopened it in March 2001, and shortly thereafter received an Excellence in Historic Preservation Award from the New York State Preservation League. The city has also recognized them for the effort. They have been leasing the space inside to local businesses since then.

== In popular culture ==
In 2001, the Standard House was used as a police station in the 2002 movie Unfaithful, however the filmmakers decided to change the ending of the movie, and the scene with "Standard House" was omitted. The building can still be seen in the "deleted scenes" section of the movie's DVD.
