= Hudson Line (Metro-North) =

Metro-North Railroad line in New York

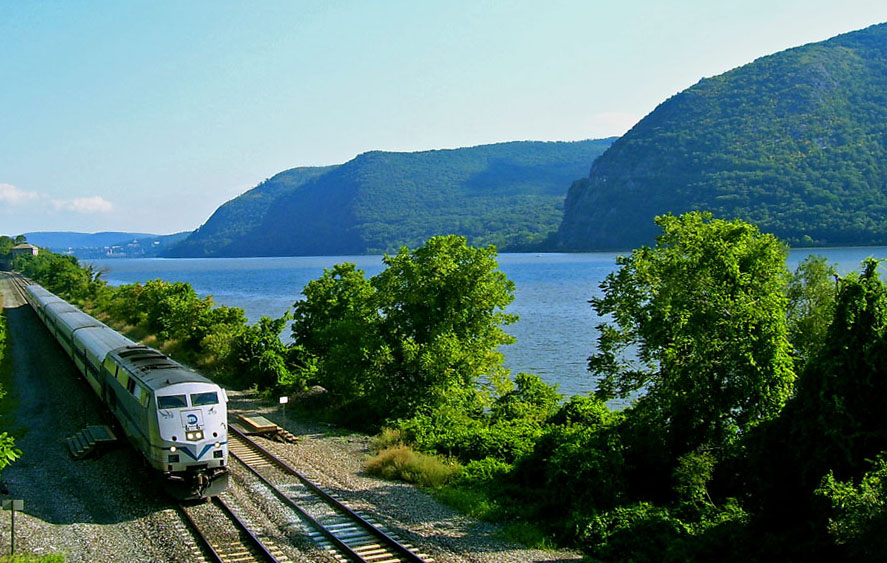
- A northbound Hudson Line train passing the Hudson Highlands

Overview
- Status: Operating
- Owner: Metropolitan Transportation Authority
- Locale: New York City, Westchester, Putnam, and Dutchess counties
- Termini: Grand Central; Croton–Harmon (short-turn) Poughkeepsie
- Stations: 30

Service
- Type: Commuter rail
- System: Metro-North Railroad
- Operator: Metro-North Railroad
- Daily ridership: 36,616 (Fall 2024)
- Ridership: 13,778,961 (annual ridership, 2024)

Technical
- Track length: 74 mi (119 km)
- Character: Commuter rail
- Track gauge: 4 ft 8 1/2 in (1,435 mm) standard gauge
- Electrification: Third rail, 750 V DC (south of Croton–Harmon)
Route map
Hudson Line highlighted in green

The Hudson Line is a commuter rail line owned and operated by the Metro-North Railroad in the U.S. state of New York. It runs north from New York City along the east shore of the Hudson River, terminating at Poughkeepsie. The line was originally the Hudson River Railroad (and the Spuyten Duyvil and Port Morris Railroad south of Spuyten Duyvil), and eventually became the Hudson Division of the New York Central Railroad. It runs along what was the far southern leg of the Central's famed "Water Level Route" to Chicago.

Croton–Harmon station divides the line into two distinct segments. South of there, the line is electrified with third rail, serving suburban stations located relatively close together. Most of the electrified zone has four tracks, usually two express and local tracks in each direction. For a few miles in the Bronx between Spuyten Duyvil and Yankees–E 153rd St, there are only two or three tracks. Local service is usually provided by electric trains, while diesel trains run express. North of Croton–Harmon, the line is not electrified and is mostly double-tracked (with a few triple track areas), with the stations spaced further apart. Service between Croton–Harmon and Poughkeepsie is provided by diesel trains; these generally run express and skip most of the stations below Croton-Harmon. From just north of Spuyten Duyvil to the end of the line, the Hudson Line forms the southern portion of Amtrak's Empire Corridor, the former main line of the Central. The planned Penn Station Access project would send some Hudson Line trains to Penn Station along the Empire Connection, with two new intermediate stops along the west side of Manhattan.

The Hudson Line is colored green on Metro-North timetables and system maps, and stations on the line have green trim. The New York Central used green color-coding for the Hudson Division as early as 1965.

== History ==
=== New York Central ===
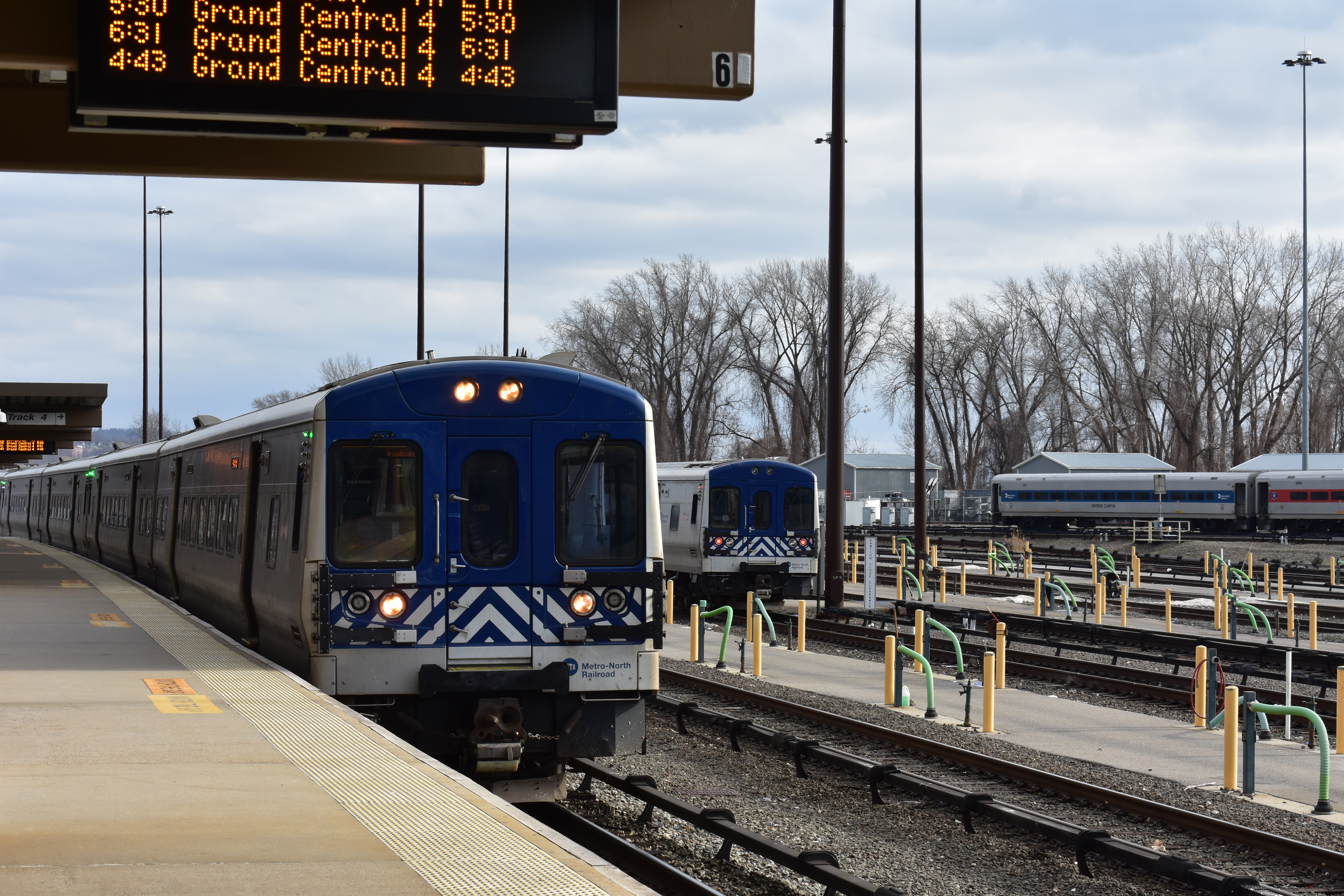
A Hudson Line train made up of M7A's approaching Croton-Harmon station, the last stop for all EMU powered trains.

The Hudson River Railroad was chartered on May 12, 1846 to extend the Troy and Greenbush Railroad, which connected Troy and Albany, south to New York City along the east bank of the Hudson River. Service began on the first 41 miles (66 km) of the line from Chambers Street and Hudson Street in Lower Manhattan to Peekskill on September 29, 1849. Service was extended to New Hamburg on December 6 and to Poughkeepsie on December 31. A separate section opened between East Albany and Hudson on June 16, 1851. This section was extended to Oakhill on July 7 and to Tivoli on August 4. The full line opened on October 8, 1851 with the completion of the final segment between Tivoli and Poughkeepsie, linking the two pieces of the line together. Prior to completion, on June 1, the Hudson River leased the Troy and Greenbush.

Cornelius Vanderbilt purchased the Hudson River Railroad in 1864, soon after he bought the parallel New York and Harlem Railroad, which is today's Harlem Line. He merged these and other short line railroads to form the New York Central and Hudson River Railroad, which was renamed the New York Central Railroad in 1914.

One of the properties owned by the New York and Harlem was the Spuyten Duyvil and Port Morris Railroad. This railroad was built in 1842, and bought in 1853 by the New York and Harlem as part of a proposal by NY&H Vice President Gouverneur Morris Jr. to integrate it into a new industrial section of the waterfront. After this railroad became property of the New York Central and Hudson River Railroad, by 1871, the line was extended through the West Bronx, along the Harlem River to connect with the Hudson River Railroad. The segment north of Mott Haven Junction became part of the Hudson Division, while the portion to the south remained part of the Harlem Division. With the opening of the line, most passenger trains were rerouted into the new Grand Central Depot via that line along the northeast bank of the Harlem River and the New York and Harlem Rail Road, also part of the New York Central system.

In 1893, a third track was added along the line between Spuyten Duyvil and Sing Sing.

=== Realignment and electrification ===
This line was rebuilt and realigned in 1905–1906 when the Harlem River Ship Canal was built. The line was realigned along the north side of the canal in Marble Hill, Manhattan. Part of the original segment around Marble Hill became a freight spur leading to the Kingsbridge Freight Station, but the track around the northern and western sides of Marble Hill was later removed and no trace of it exists. Today, the realigned line serves as the segment of the Metro-North Railroad Hudson Line between Mott Haven Junction and the West Side Line. The former Kingsbridge Freight Spur and station has been occupied by the grounds of the John F. Kennedy High School since the 1970s. The New York and Putnam Railroad spur remained until 1999.

As part of the construction of Grand Central Terminal in the early 1900s, all of New York Central's lines that ran into the terminal were electrified. Third rail was installed on the Hudson and Harlem Divisions, while the New Haven Division received overhead wires on the segments that were not shared with the Harlem and Hudson Division. The first electric train departed for the temporary Grand Central Station, from the Harlem Division's High Bridge station in the Bronx, on September 30, 1906. Electrification would eventually extend to Croton–Harmon station.

The former main line south of Spuyten Duyvil remained for freight to the docks along Manhattan's west side and minimal passenger service to the West Side Station on Chambers Street (used until 1916). Passenger service on this line, which became known as the 30th Street Branch, continued until late 1929 or early 1930.

The New York Central operated many intercity and commuter trains over this line for many years. It was a key route in connecting Grand Central Terminal in New York to LaSalle Street Station in Chicago. Commuter service was always concentrated south of Poughkeepsie: by 1940, only three daily round trips – none of them timed for commuting to New York City – made local stops between Albany and Poughkeepsie. By 1960, only a single daily round trip (timed for commuting to Albany) made local stops. It was cut to a Hudson–Albany round trip with four intermediate stops by 1964, and discontinued around 1965; some intercity trains continued to stop at Rhinecliff and Hudson.

=== Penn Central and Conrail ===
At the end of World War II, private rail service began a sharp decline with the start of the Jet Age and the construction of the Interstate Highway System. NYC, facing declining year-over-year profits, merged in 1968 with its former rival, the Pennsylvania Railroad, forming the Penn Central Transportation Company. Penn Central continued to lose money and attempted several maneuvers to delay bankruptcy, including auctioning off the air rights of Grand Central Terminal; the Pennsylvania Railroad had done the same thing to Penn Station. However, this approval was denied, and the denial was affirmed in Penn Central Transportation Co. v. New York City, a 1978 decision by the United States Supreme Court.

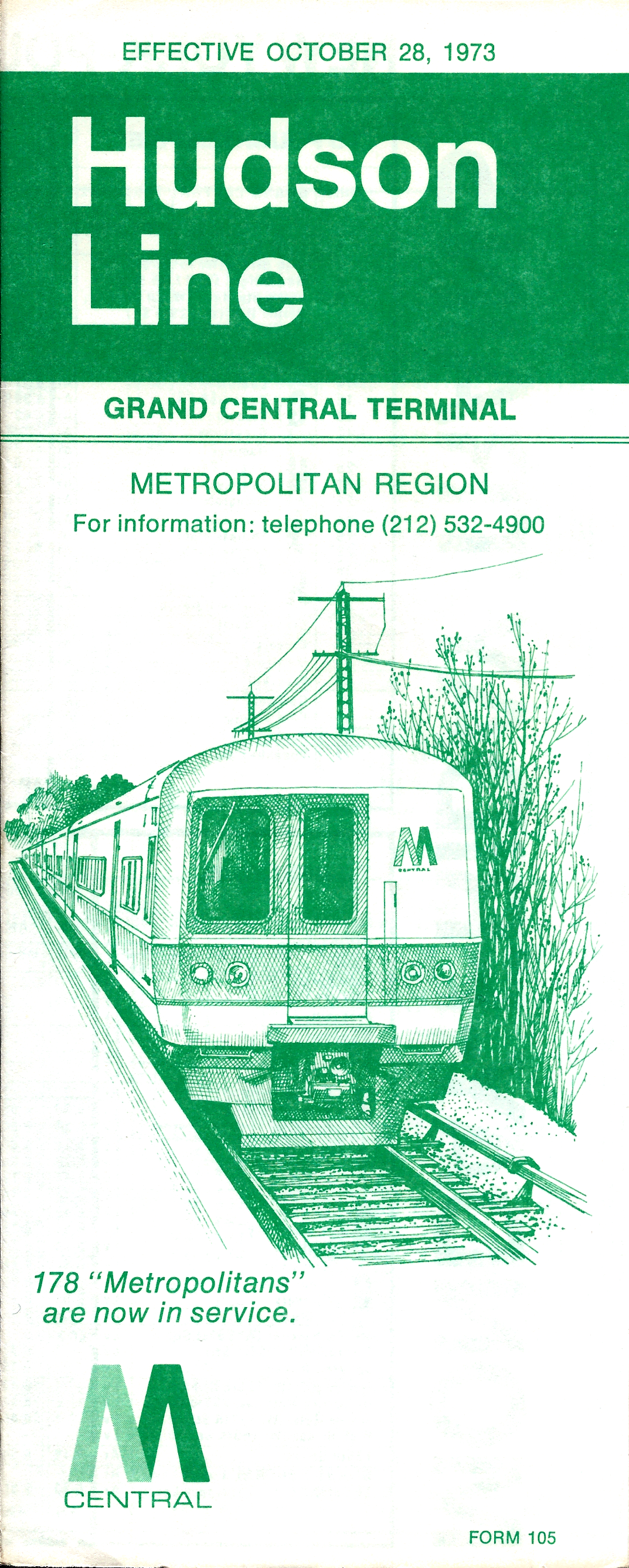
Penn Central Railroad Form 105 effective October 28, 1973 showing Hudson Line suburban timetables of the newly created Metropolitan Region. The then-new Budd M-1 Metropolitan rail cars had just been delivered and placed into service.

On May 1, 1971, the National Railroad Passenger Corporation took over all intercity passenger service in the US. Penn Central continued to operate freight and commuter service along the Hudson line until it was folded into Conrail on April 1, 1976. Conrail continued to operate commuter service to Poughkeepsie & freight service north of Poughkeepsie (while, Amtrak's Empire Service continued to Albany and beyond). On July 1, 1973, along with several other stations in Penn Central's Metropolitan Region, the 138th Street, Oscawana and Manitou stops were closed. Manitou reopened in 1983.

On September 10, 1974, the MTA announced that work would start on the construction of high-level platforms at eleven stations in the Bronx and Manhattan including at the Marble Hill, Spuyten Duyvil, University Heights, Morris Heights and Riverdale stations on the Hudson Line. The entire project cost $2.8 million. The work was expected to be completed in the late summer of 1975. As part of the work, the University Heights, Morris Heights and Marble Hill stations had island platforms installed, while side platforms were installed at Riverdale and Spuyten Duyvil. All of the platforms on the Hudson Line were 340 feet (100 m)-long with the exception of a 170 feet (52 m)-long side platform at Spuyten Duyvil and a 170 feet (52 m)-long platform at Morris Heights, which was set to be lengthened at a later date. The abandoned station building at University Heights was removed as part of the project. High-level platforms at Spuyten Duyvil and Riverdale were completed in early 1975. On May 2, 1975, the new platforms on the Hudson Line were formally put into service. The completion was marked with a ceremony with the head of the MTA, David Yunich present. The completion of these five stations marked the completion of a $22.8 million project to install high-level platforms at 43 Penn Central stations. The high-level platforms allowed the new Metropolitan and Cosmopolitan to use the stations.

During the late 1970s, the Hudson Line's former northbound express track between Spuyten Duyvil and its merger with the Harlem Line was removed. The stations along the line between Spuyten Duyvil and Yankees–East 153rd Street were rebuilt on top of this track's roadbed.

=== Metro-North ===
In 1983, the MTA Metro-North Railroad took control of all commuter operations in the Hudson Valley. As part of the MTA's five-year capital program in 1982, the MTA planned to remove one of the four tracks on the line. The MTA expected that the change would provide more flexible train service as the line would have received a computerized system capable of running trains in either direction on the three tracks. As part of the plan, trains would have received cab signalling. The change was expected to be completed in three to four years. The New York State DOT and Amtrak were strongly opposed to the proposal as the plan did not take into account future growth of passenger and freight traffic, and reduced the ability to move around stalled trains. Converting the then-existing four tracks to reversible cab signaling would have cost $15 million, which the MTA did not have.

On May 23, 2009, a new station was opened at East 153rd Street in the Bronx to serve Yankee Stadium. It sees regular service on the Hudson Line, plus special service from the Hudson, Harlem, and New Haven Lines for New York Yankees games.

On December 1, 2013, a southbound train derailed near the Spuyten Duyvil station in the Bronx. Four people were killed and more than 60 passengers were injured in the crash. Federal investigators from the National Transportation Safety Board determined that the train was traveling at 82 miles per hour (132 km/h), a speed nearly three times the maximum allowable speed of 30 miles per hour (48 km/h). The train's brakes were apparently operating normally and area tracks in proper condition.

==== Purchase by the MTA ====
On November 13, 2018, the MTA announced its intent to purchase the Hudson and Harlem Lines as well as the Grand Central Terminal for up to $35.065 million, plus a discount rate of 6.25%. The purchase would include all inventory, operations, improvements, and maintenance associated with each asset, except for the air rights over Grand Central. At the time, the Hudson and Harlem Lines were owned by Argent Ventures, a holding company that had taken possession of Penn Central's assets upon its bankruptcy, while the Grand Central Terminal was owned by Midtown TDR Ventures. Under the terms of the leases for each asset, the MTA would only be able to exercise an option to purchase the three assets before October 2019. The MTA's finance committee approved the proposed purchase on November 13, 2018, and the purchase was approved by the full board two days later. The deal finally closed in March 2020, with the MTA taking ownership of the terminal and rail lines.

The MTA purchased the segment of the Hudson Line from Grand Central to a point 2 miles (3.2 km) north of Poughkeepsie. North of this point, milepost 75.8, the CSX Transportation-owned and Amtrak-operated Hudson Subdivision rail line continues north to Albany.

In 2025, the MTA published a plan to fortify the Hudson Line right-of-way against climate change, including sea level rise and extreme weather. At the time, more than half of the line's length was in a floodplain, and about 20 miles (32 km) of the line from Riverdale to Croton-Harmon was especially susceptible to incidents like mudslides and washouts.

==== Extension of service north of Poughkeepsie ====
Since the tracks continue north of Poughkeepsie, there have been various proposals over the years from both the MTA (Metro-North's parent agency) and Amtrak to extend service northwards. New York Central and Penn Central operated rail service north of Poughkeepsie to Albany-Rensselaer until April 30, 1971; since then, only Amtrak's intercity trains continue beyond Poughkeepsie.

In 1999, Metro-North proposed to extend the line 25 miles (40 km) to Tivoli or just 15 miles (24 km) to Rhinecliff. Three new stations would have been built – at Tivoli, Staatsburg and Hyde Park – while the terminus at Rhinecliff would have received commuter service in addition to Amtrak service. Parking facilities would have been built at the stations, and a yard would have been built. The Draft Environmental Impact Study for the extension, which would have cost $3 million, was deemed as necessary as ridership on the northern part of the Hudson Line was growing faster than that of any other part of the system. The Federal Transit Administration provided some funding for the study. The Towns of Stanford, Milan, Red Hook and Rhinebeck and the Villages of Tivoli and Rhinebeck passed resolutions against the study. The study was not done because of significant opposition.

In January 2007, supervisors of some towns north of Poughkeepsie expressed new interest in extending rail service.

The MTA announced in October 2025 that one daily Hudson Line round-trip would be extended north of Poughkeepsie to Albany–Rensselaer beginning in early 2026. The extended trip would make intermediate stops at Rhinecliff and Hudson stations. In January 2026, the Governor Kathy Hochul announced that with the full restoration of Empire Service in March 2026, Amtrak has notified New York State and the MTA that it will no longer sanction temporary Metro-North service to Albany at this time.

State Senator Michelle Hinchey and 17 colleagues, backed by the Empire State Passengers Association and labor groups, sent a letter to Governor Kathy Hochul on April 27, 2026, urging the revival of a plan to expand Metro-North service north of Poughkeepsie. The lawmakers emphasize the project's importance for regional economic development and equitable transportation access.

== Line description ==
The southernmost 11 miles (18 km) of the Hudson Line, south of Spuyten Duyvil, is not parallel to the Hudson River. Much of the line in the Bronx parallels the Harlem River, while the entirety of the line in Manhattan follows Park Avenue. North of Spuyten Duyvil, the Hudson Line travels mostly parallel to the river (viewable on the left side northbound and the right side southbound) until the line terminates in Poughkeepsie.

=== Manhattan and the Bronx ===
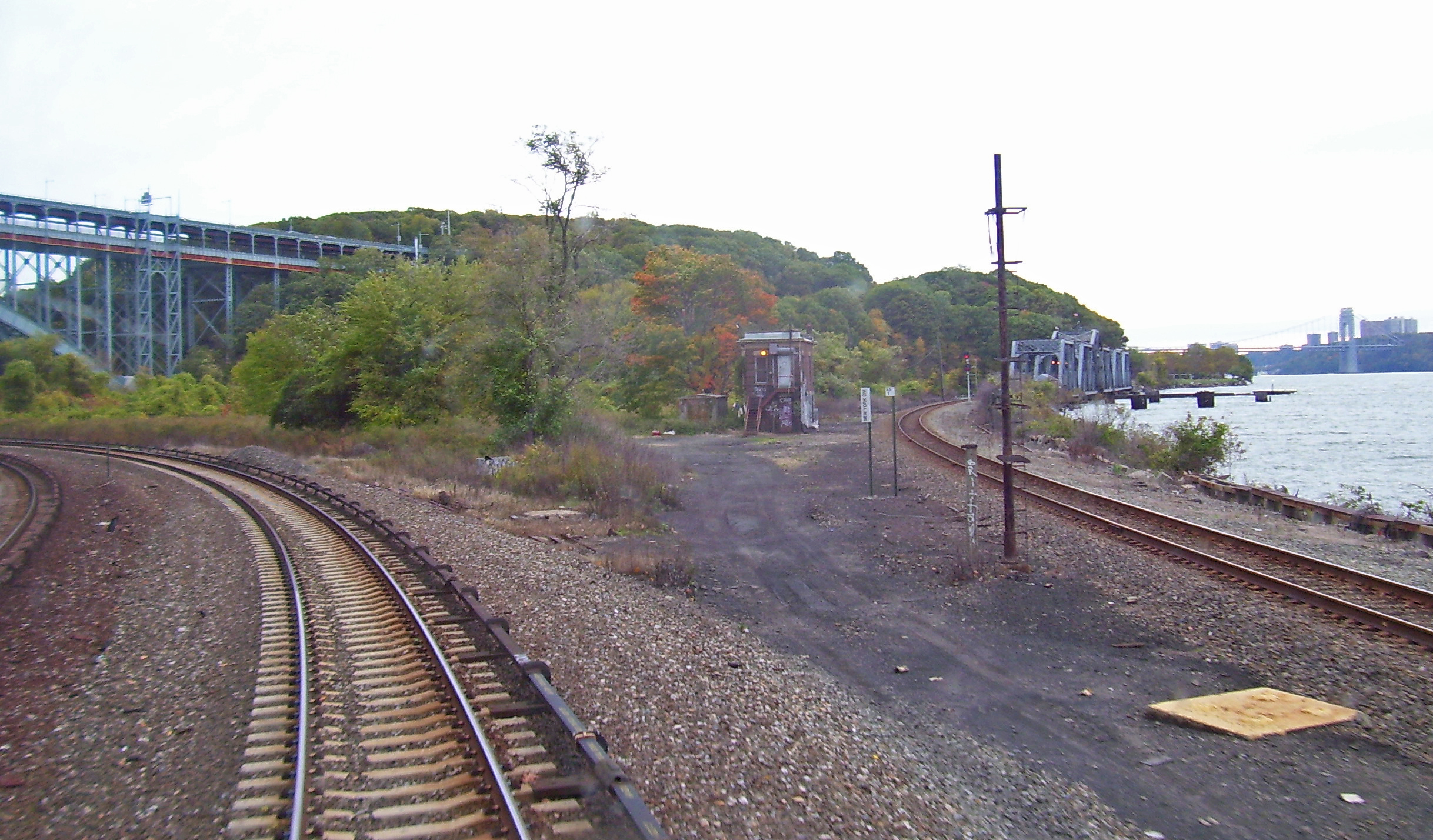
The West Side Line (right, un-electrified) joins the Hudson Line just north of Spuyten Duyvil.

Once past 125th Street and over the Harlem River, the Hudson Line departs from the track shared with the Harlem and New Haven Lines, passing first Yankees–East 153rd Street, which offers access to the lower Bronx and Yankee Stadium. After it is the employee-only Highbridge stop as it follows the river northward and, at first, the Major Deegan Expressway.

Marble Hill, technically in Manhattan despite being on the mainland, offers a transfer to the IRT Broadway–Seventh Avenue Line of the New York City Subway at the 225th Street station. A short curve away brings the trains to Spuyten Duyvil and its stairs to the street. Just past the station, the track rejoins the original Hudson River Railroad, shared with Amtrak, and after one more stop at Riverdale is out of New York City.

=== Westchester County ===
The Palisades present themselves across the river as trains pass through the city of Yonkers and its four stops, mostly local. A few express trains do stop at the recently renovated Yonkers station, the first where a transfer to Amtrak is possible.

Smaller, local-only suburban stations are passed as the Tappan Zee Bridge appears to the north and the river widens. Finally, between Irvington and Tarrytown, it passes overhead. Rockland County fades to almost three miles (4.8 km) away across Haverstraw Bay. But after passing through Sing Sing prison, the train reaches Ossining, where a ferry brings travelers across the wide river to Haverstraw.

Electric trains end their runs one stop beyond, at Croton–Harmon, a terminal shared again with Amtrak just south of Harmon Yard and east of Croton Point. The tracks veer inland, closely following US 9, to the next and newest stop, Cortlandt, the only non-New York City station on the line where the Hudson River cannot be seen.

The Hudson River reappears at Peekskill, the last stop in the county, where the Bear Mountain Bridge can be seen to the north.

=== Putnam and Dutchess counties ===
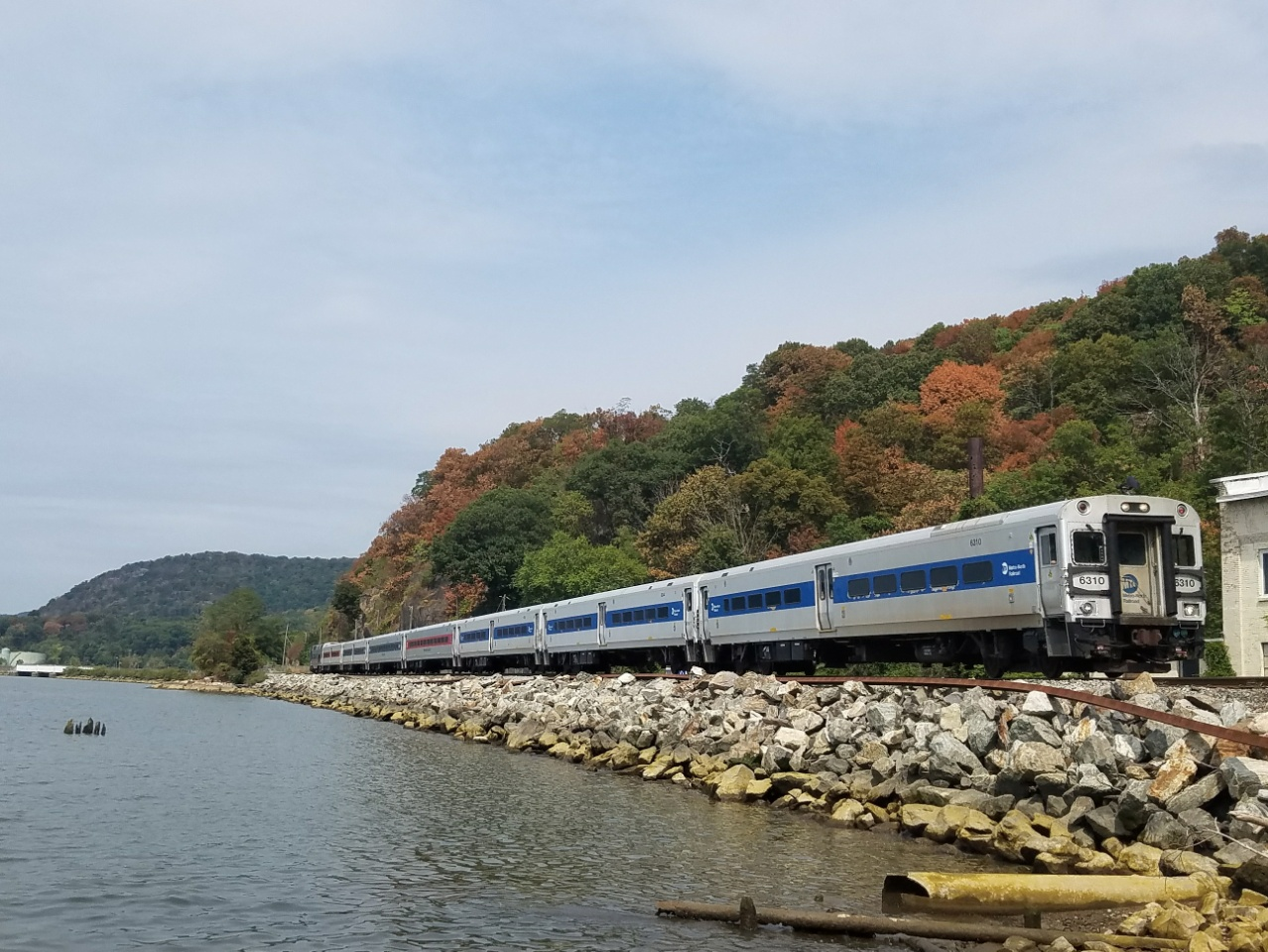
Metro-North Hudson Line train near Peekskill

North of Peekskill the river narrows as the Hudson Highlands begin. Dunderberg and Bear mountains can be seen across the river. The train passes through two short tunnels, one under the Bear Mountain Bridge abutment. Putnam County's first station, Manitou, serves a small hamlet. Just north of Garrison, there is another tunnel and then a view of the stone buildings of West Point; the riverside village of Cold Spring is the next stop, last in the county.

The Dutchess County line is crossed in a pair of 842-foot (257 m) tunnels under Breakneck Ridge at Breakneck Point; across the river Storm King Mountain is seen. The Breakneck Ridge flag stop marks the end of the Highlands as the river once again broadens around Newburgh Bay. Shortly after leaving Beacon the train passes under the Newburgh-Beacon Bridge.

Just upriver is New Hamburg, a hamlet of the Town of Poughkeepsie and a station closed in the NYCRR days but eventually reopened. There is a stretch of 7.5 miles (12.1 km) between the New Hamburg and Poughkeepsie stations. North of Poughkeepsie, the tracks continue north toward Albany.

== Rolling stock ==
Electric service between Grand Central and Croton–Harmon uses M3A and M7A units (the same as the Harlem Line). Diesel trains are headed by Genesis P32AC-DMs or Siemens SC-42DMs pulling Shoreliner cars with a cab car at the south end. Both types of locomotives are dual-mode, but the SC-42DMs can run off of third rail through the entirety of electric territory, while the P32AC-DMs only run off third-rail in the Park Avenue Tunnel.

=== Penn Station Access ===
As part of the Penn Station Access project, the MTA has proposed to send some Hudson Line trains to Penn Station in Midtown Manhattan. Hudson Line trains would access Penn Station via the Empire Connection, a segment of track owned by Amtrak. This segment currently used by Amtrak's Empire Corridor trains to access Penn Station, diverges from the Hudson Line between Riverdale and Spuyten Duyvil stations. The proposal includes the construction of two new Hudson Line stations along the Empire Connection in Manhattan; one near 125th Street in Manhattanville and the other near 62nd Street on the Upper West Side. The project would give Hudson Line riders a direct ride to destinations on the West Side.

== Stations ==
Milepost Zero on the Hudson Line is at the north property line of 42nd St (which is 200–300 feet south of the ends of the tracks). The Marble Hill Cutoff shortened the line by 0.73 miles (1.17 km) circa 1906, so Yonkers station (for example) is at milepost 15.24 but is about 14.46 miles (23.27 km) from the end of the tracks at GCT. The Hudson Line did not serve the stations in the Park Avenue tunnel.

Zone	Location	Station	Miles (km)	Date opened	Date closed	Connections / notes
1	Manhattan	Grand Central Terminal	0.0 (0)	October 6, 1871		Metro-North Railroad: ■ Harlem Line, ■ New Haven Line; Long Island Rail Road (at Grand Central Madison); NYC Subway: (at Grand Central–42nd Street); NYCT Bus, MTA Bus
1	Manhattan	59th Street				Built during the late 1870s; trains never stopped here.
1	Manhattan	72nd Street			June 23, 1901	
1	Manhattan	86th Street	2.2 (3.5)	May 15, 1876	June 23, 1901	
1	Manhattan	110th Street	3.4 (5.5)	May 15, 1876	June 17, 1906	
1	Manhattan	Harlem–125th Street	4.2 (6.8)	October 25, 1897		Metro-North Railroad: ■ Harlem Line, ■ New Haven Line; NYC Subway: (at 125th Street); NYCT Bus
2	The Bronx					
2	The Bronx	138th Street	5.0 (8.0)	c. 1858	July 2, 1972	
2	The Bronx	Yankees–East 153rd Street	5.9 (9.5)	May 23, 2009		Metro-North Railroad (game days only): ■ Harlem Line, ■ New Haven Line; NYC Subway: (at 161st Street–Yankee Stadium); NYCT Bus; SeaStreak (game days only)
2	The Bronx	Highbridge	6.7 (10.8)	c. 1870s	June 3, 1975	Metro-North employee-only stop.
2	The Bronx	Morris Heights	8.1 (13.0)	c. 1870s		NYCT Bus
2	The Bronx	University Heights	8.7 (14.0)	c. 1870s		NYCT Bus
2	The Bronx	Fordham Heights		c. 1870s	Before 1920	Station merged into University Heights.
2	Manhattan	Marble Hill	9.8 (15.8)	1906		NYC Subway: (at Marble Hill–225th Street); NYCT Bus, MTA Bus
2	The Bronx					
2	The Bronx	Kings Bridge		c. 1870s	c. 1905	Removed during 1905–06 realignment of Hudson Branch along the Harlem River Ship Canal
2	The Bronx	Spuyten Duyvil (Note: ADA accessible on northbound platform only)	11.1 (17.9)	c. 1870s		Hudson Rail Link
2	The Bronx	Riverdale	13.0 (20.9)			Hudson Rail Link
2	The Bronx	Mount St. Vincent		On or before 1897	June 3, 1975	
3	Yonkers	Ludlow (Note: ADA-accessible only northbound)	14.3 (23.0)			Bee-Line Bus
3	Yonkers	Yonkers	15.1 (24.3)	1911		Amtrak: Adirondack, Berkshire Flyer, Empire Service, Ethan Allen Express, Maple Leaf; Bee-Line Bus
3	Yonkers	Glenwood	16.2 (26.1)			Bee-Line Bus
3	Yonkers	Greystone	17.8 (28.6)	1899		Bee-Line Bus
4	Hastings-on-Hudson	Hastings-on-Hudson	19.5 (31.4)	September 29, 1849		Bee-Line Bus
4	Dobbs Ferry	Dobbs Ferry	20.7 (33.3)	September 29, 1849		Bee-Line Bus
4	Irvington	Ardsley-on-Hudson	21.7 (34.9)	c. 1895		
4	Irvington	Irvington (Note: ADA-accessible only northbound)	22.7 (36.5)			
5	Tarrytown	Tarrytown	25.2 (40.6)	September 29, 1849		Bee-Line Bus, Lower Hudson Transit Link
5	Sleepy Hollow	Philipse Manor	26.5 (42.6)	January 30, 1911		
5	Briarcliff Manor	Scarborough	29.5 (47.5)	Before 1860		
5	Ossining	Ossining	30.8 (49.6)	1848		Bee-Line Bus; NY Waterway: Haverstraw–Ossining Ferry
5	Croton-on-Hudson	Croton–Harmon	33.2 (53.4)			Amtrak: Adirondack, Empire Service, Berkshire Flyer, Ethan Allen Express, Lake Shore Limited, Maple Leaf; Bee-Line Bus; Northern terminus of electrification - services north of this station use diesel sets.
5	Croton-on-Hudson	Croton North		September 29, 1849 1983	1984	
6	Cortlandt					
6	Cortlandt	Oscawana			July 2, 1973	
6	Cortlandt	Crugers			1996	Replaced by Cortlandt station in 1996.
6	Cortlandt	Cortlandt	38.4 (61.8)	April 1996		Bee-Line Bus
6	Cortlandt	Montrose			1996	Replaced by Cortlandt station in 1996.
6	Peekskill	Peekskill	41.2 (66.3)	September 29, 1849		Bee-Line Bus
6	Philipstown					
6	Philipstown	Roa Hook				
7	Philipstown	Manitou	46.0 (74.0)			Limited-service stop.
7	Philipstown	Garrison	49.9 (80.3)			
7	Cold Spring	Cold Spring	52.5 (84.5)			Putnam Transit: Cold Spring Trolley (seasonal)
7	Philipstown	Storm King				Located at the south end of the Breakneck Ridge Tunnels
7	Fishkill	Breakneck Ridge	55.0 (88.5)			Limited-service stop - usually used for hikers.
8
8		Dutchess Junction		c. 1866	1950s	Former junction with Newburgh, Dutchess and Connecticut Railroad (eliminated in 1916)
8	Beacon	Beacon	59.0 (95.0)			Dutchess County Public Transit, Leprechaun Lines, Newburgh-Beacon Bridge Shuttle
8		Chelsea		1901	July 2, 1973	
8	New Hamburg	New Hamburg	65.0 (104.6)	December 6, 1849 October 17, 1981	July 2, 1973	Dutchess County Public Transit
9
9	Crown Heights	Camelot				Cut off by a mine in Crown Heights
9	Poughkeepsie	Poughkeepsie	73.5 (118.3)	January 4, 1850		Amtrak: Adirondack, Berkshire Flyer, Empire Service, Ethan Allen Express, Lake Shore Limited, Maple Leaf; Dutchess County Public Transit, City of Poughkeepsie Transit, UCAT, Short Line, Trailways of New York

== Bibliography ==
- Hasbrouck, Frank (1909). The History of Dutchess County, New York. Poughkeepsie, New York: S.A. Matthieu.
