= Peekskill station =

Metro-North Railroad station in New York

Peekskill
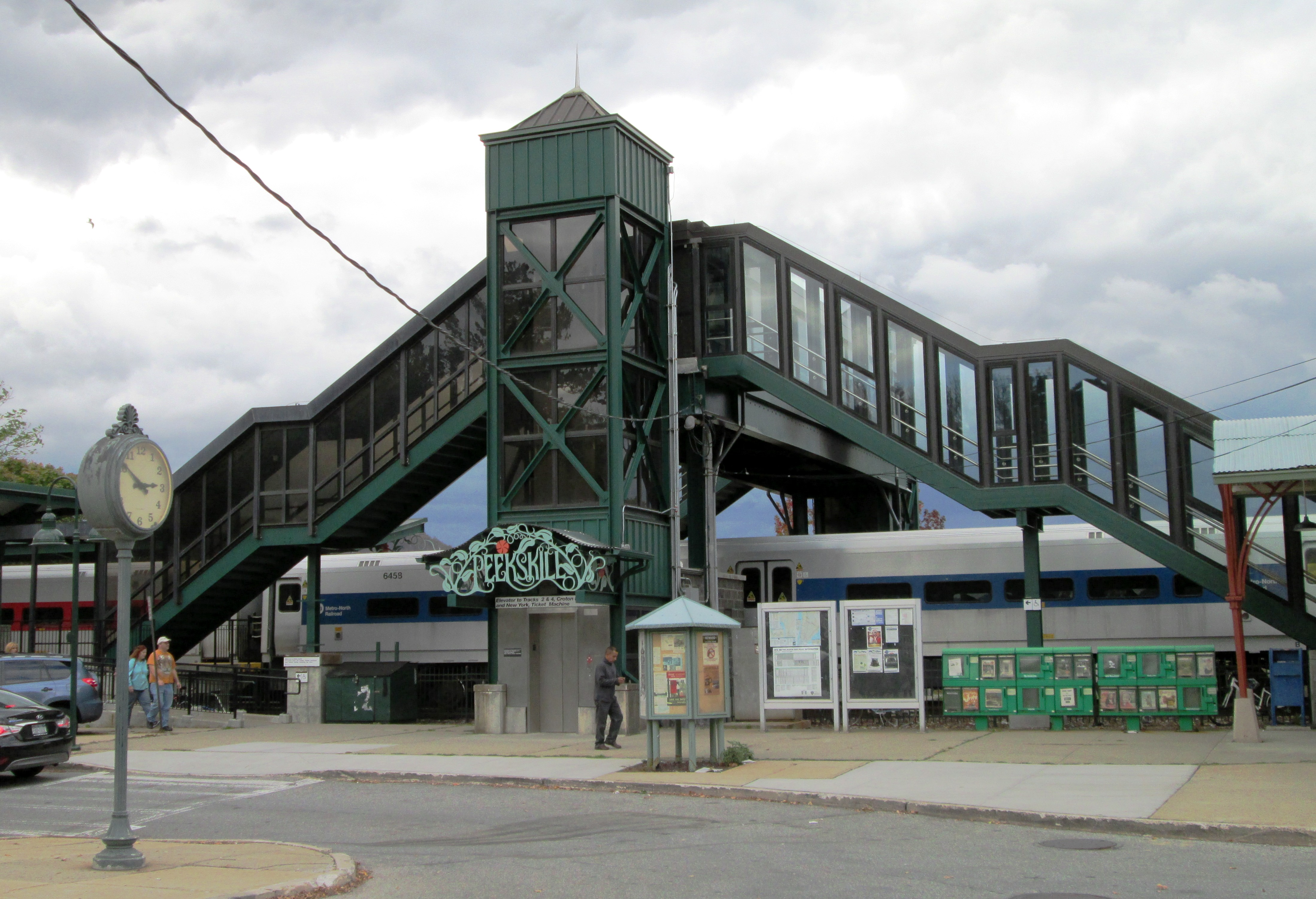
- Station and overpass, 2014

General information
- Location: 300 Railroad Avenue, Peekskill, New York
- Coordinates: 41°17′06″N 73°55′51″W
- Line: Hudson Line
- Platforms: 1 side platform 1 island platform
- Tracks: 4
- Connections: Bee-Line Bus System: 16, 18, 31

Construction
- Parking: 488 spaces
- Accessible: yes

Other information
- Fare zone: 6

History
- Opened: September 29, 1849
- Rebuilt: 1874

Passengers
- 2018: 1,598 (Metro-North)
- Rank: 39 of 109

Services
Preceding station	Metro-North Railroad	Following station
Manitou toward Poughkeepsie	Hudson Line limited service	Cortlandt toward Grand Central
Garrison toward Poughkeepsie	Hudson Line	Cortlandt toward Grand Central
Former services
Preceding station	Metro-North Railroad	Following station
Manitou toward Poughkeepsie	Hudson Line	Montrose closed 1996 toward Grand Central
Preceding station	New York Central Railroad	Following station
Manitou toward Chicago	Main Line	Harmon toward New York
Terminus	Hudson Division	Montrose toward New York
Location

Peekskill station is a commuter rail stop on the Metro-North Railroad's Hudson Line, located in Peekskill, New York.

The former station building built by the New York Central and Hudson River Railroad in 1874 still stands, although it is no longer staffed.

== History ==
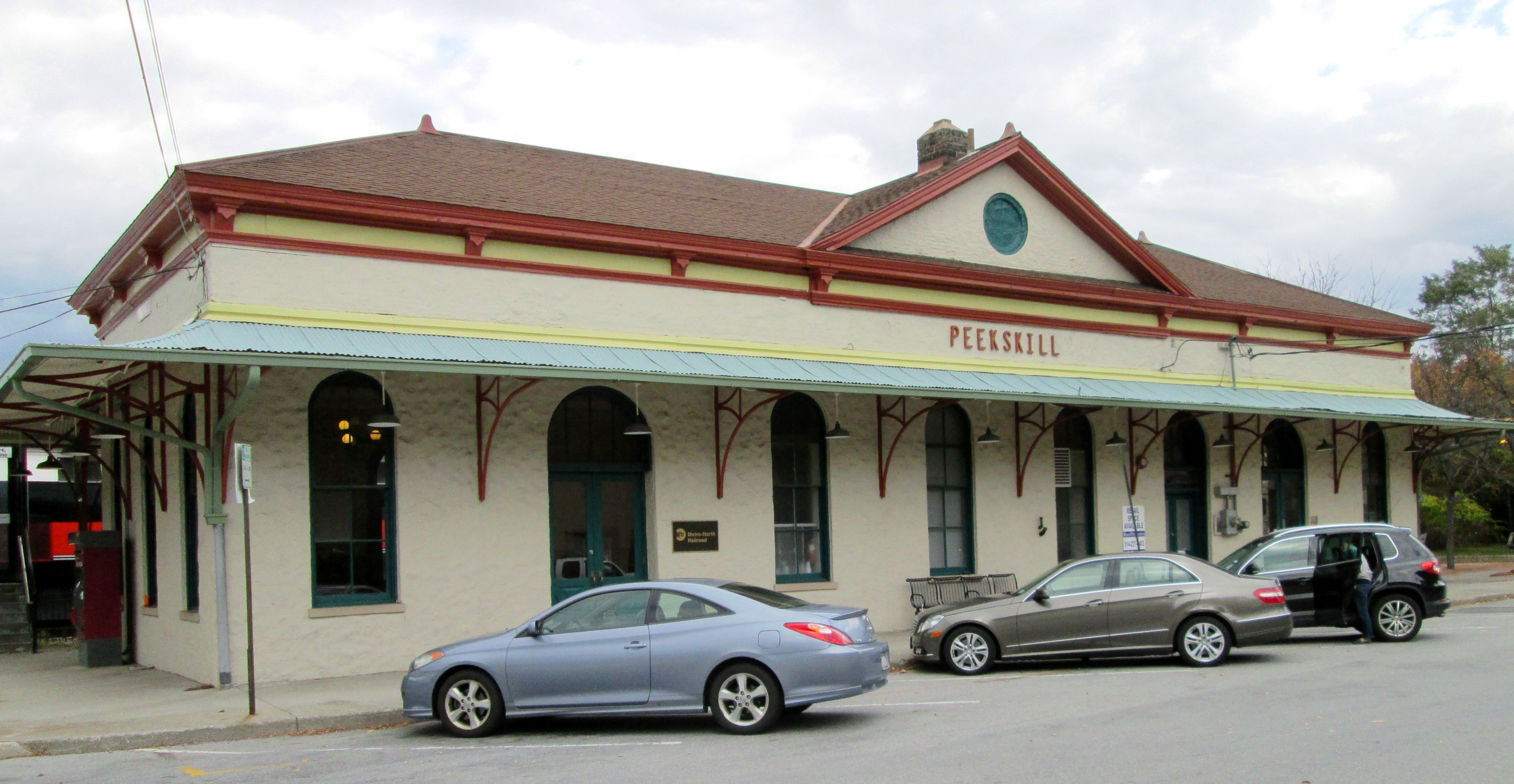
The former station building, 2014

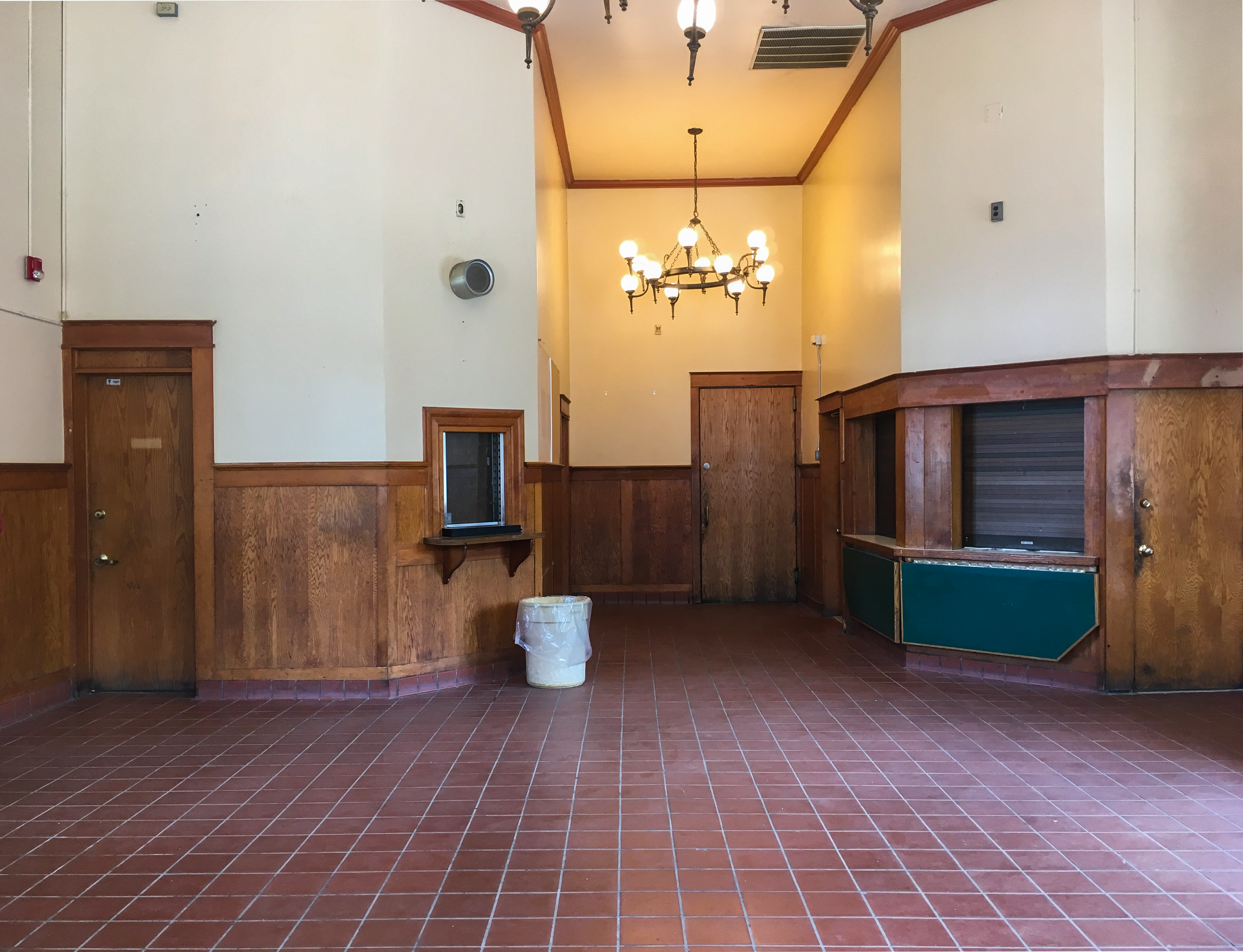
Interior of the building

Rail service in Peekskill began on September 29, 1849 with the Hudson River Railroad. The freight depot was the site of a February 19, 1861 visit by Abraham Lincoln who stopped there during his train trip to his inauguration. The railroad was acquired by the New York Central and Hudson River Railroad in November 1869, and they rebuilt the passenger station in 1874. NYC&HR rebuilt the freight depot around 1890 and today it is on the National Register of Historic Places, as is the Standard House which served the railroad, as well as ships on the Hudson River.

A 1943 New York Central schedule lists Peekskill as the northern terminus of its Hudson Division commuter service. Trains continuing north of Peekskill were "long distance" trains, continuing not just to Poughkeepsie but also to Albany and other destinations.

With the railroads in decline during the post-WW II era, New York Central merged with their long time rival Pennsylvania Railroad in 1968 and the station became a Penn Central station. Amtrak took over intercity passenger service in 1971, but Peekskill station continued to serve only the expanded Penn Central Hudson Division trains which by that time ran to Poughkeepsie and were subsidized by the Metropolitan Transportation Authority. Conrail took over Penn Central in 1976 and ran Hudson Branch trains as far north as Albany until 1981 when they reverted to Poughkeepsie where it has remained ever since. MTA assigned the station to the newly established Metro-North Commuter Railroad in 1983.

== Station layout ==
The station has four tracks and two high-level side platforms each six cars long. Tracks 4 and 6 terminate at the north end of the station while tracks 1 and 2 continue on. The station is located just south of a grade crossing.
