= Breakneck Ridge station =

Metro-North Railroad station in New York

Breakneck Ridge
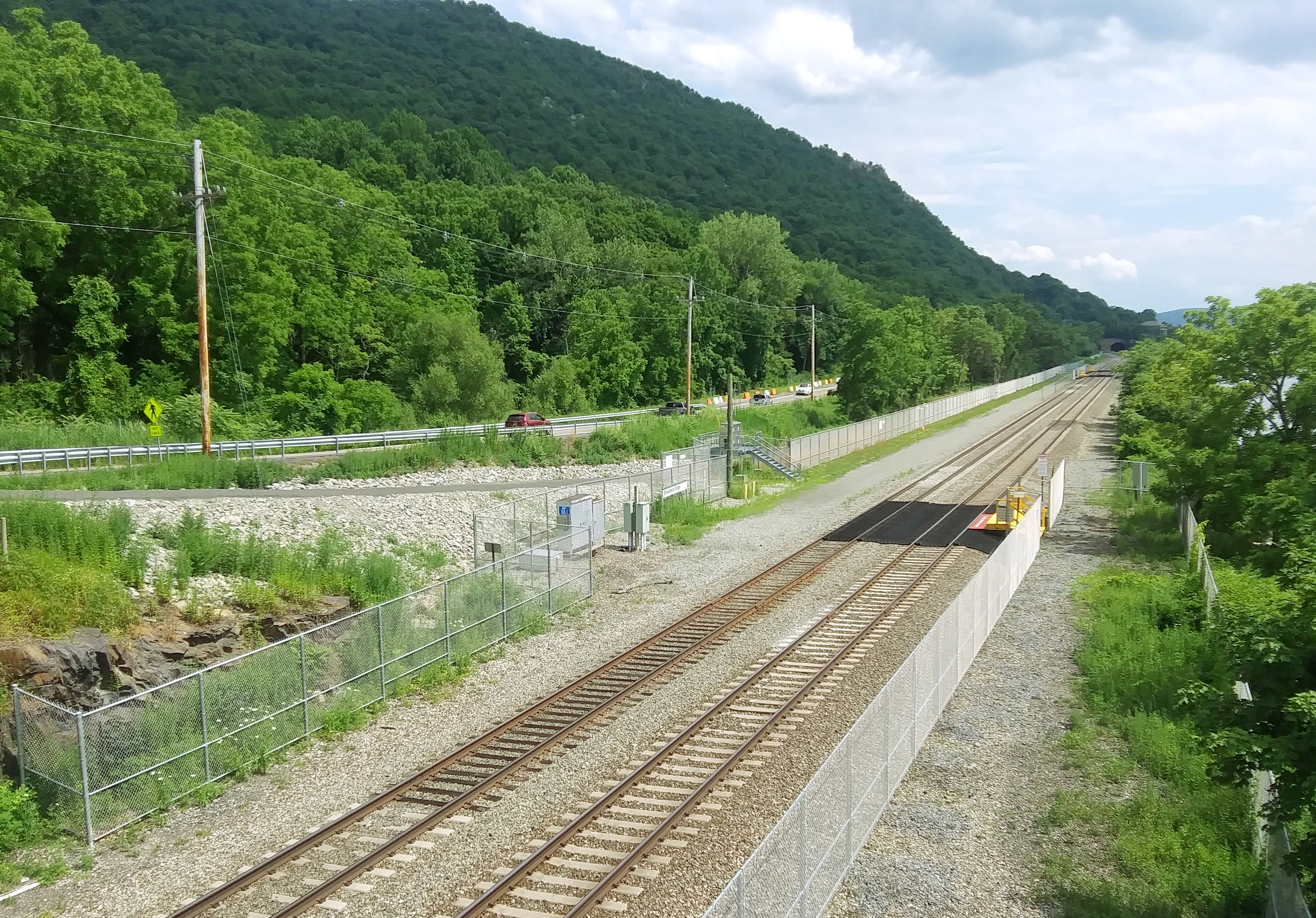
- Station in 2022 with safety enhancements; ridge itself is in background.

General information
- Location: 1 Route 9D, Beacon, New York
- Coordinates: 41.4508°N 73.9829°W
- Line: Hudson Line
- Platforms: 2 low-level side platforms
- Tracks: 2

Other information
- Fare zone: 7

History
- Rebuilt: 2025–2027

Passengers
- 2018: 37 boardings per weekend

Services
Preceding station	Metro-North Railroad	Following station
Beacon toward Poughkeepsie	Hudson Line limited service	Cold Spring toward Grand Central
Location

Breakneck Ridge station is a temporarily closed rail station on the Metro-North Railroad Hudson Line, serving campers and hikers traveling to and from Breakneck Ridge, in Fishkill, New York. Trains stop at the station on Saturdays, Sundays, and holidays only.

== Station layout ==
The station has two small, wooden low-level side platforms each long enough for one door of one car to receive or discharge passengers. It is located off an embankment from New York State Route 9D, with only one sign (on the east side of the track), merely a small path leading to the overpass and then down to the tracks about a half-mile (800 m) north of the main parking area for the Breakneck Ridge hiking trail.

== History ==
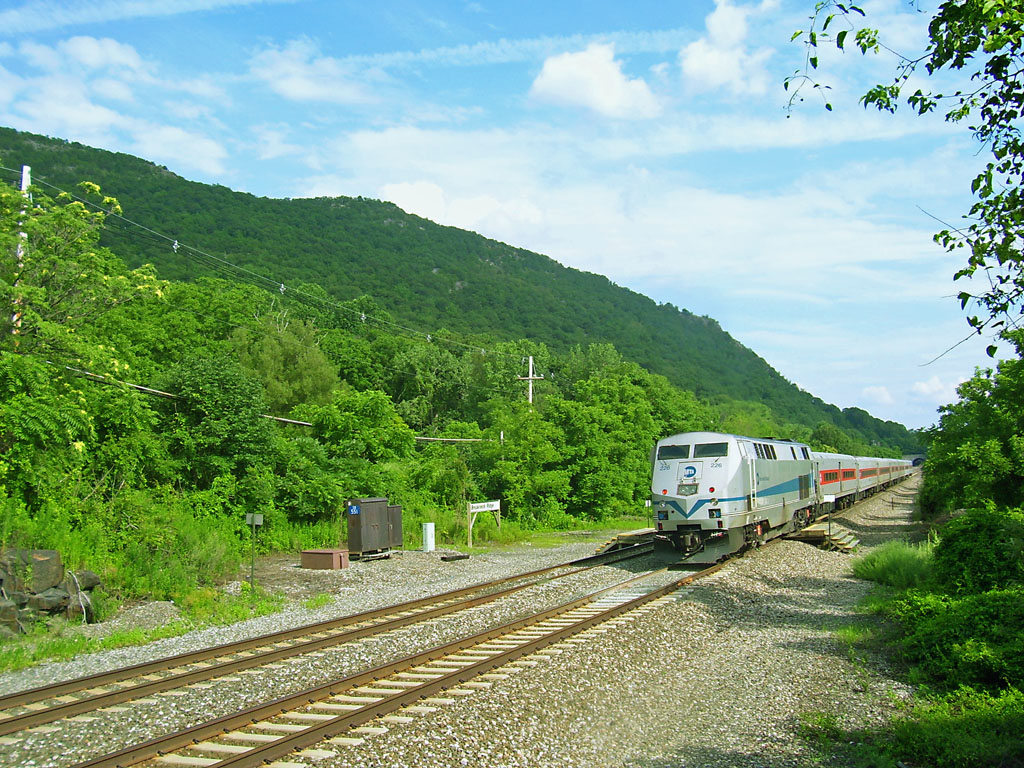
The station prior to the 2020–2022 changes

In June 2017, the Town of Fishkill requested a portion of Metro-North's property to build and operate a multi-use trail from New York State Route 9D to the Hudson Line. It would run from the Breakneck Ridge Trailhead before running north to the pedestrian overpass that provides access to the inbound side of Metro-North's Breakneck Ridge station. To be known as the "Breakneck Connector," it is the first portion of the proposed Hudson Highland Fjord Trail to be constructed. Over the past few years, more people have been using the Breakneck Ridge station, resulting in an increase in weekend service at the station.

The station has low-level platforms which are connected to Route 9D by dirt paths, posing a safety risk. The Trail will directly connect the station and the trail head without meeting Route 9D at-grade. The low-level platforms at the station will be replaced with small high-level platforms with ADA accessible ramps. A newly designed parking lot will be constructed while maintaining an existing Metro-North access point for maintenance vehicles. The platforms and other appurtenances will be paid for by the Town for $200,000. The land will be leased for 257 years to the Town of Fishkill. The stop and trailhead was initially planned to close for reconstruction at the beginning of 2018, with reopening planned for April 2019. However, by May 2019, the station's closure and reconstruction, along with that of the rest of the Breakneck Ridge trailhead, was slated for mid-2020 at the earliest.

The station closed in 2020 when the state closed Breakneck Ridge and other trails due to the number of hikers walking along Route 9D. The first round of construction began in October 2021. The station reopened on May 28, 2022, with most of the track access outside the platforms fenced off, anti-trespass panels on the tracks near the platforms, more visible warning and wayfinding signage, and a path from Route 9D to the overpass along the fencing.

In June 2022, the MTA credited the reopening of the station with Metro-North carrying 90 percent of its pre-pandemic ridership on the two following weekends. The station was expected to close again from late 2022 to 2025 during construction of the full Breakneck Connector project. The station remained open through 2023 and 2024; however, it closed for two years starting on April 21, 2025, for a full renovation of the station and footbridge.
