= Hudson River Railroad =

Overview
- Dates of operation: 1846–1869
- Successor: New York Central and Hudson River Railroad

Technical
- Track gauge: 1,435 mm (4 ft 8 1/2 in)
- Length: 144 miles (232 km)

The Hudson River Railroad was a railway company in the United States. It was incorporated in 1846 to build a line up the east side of the Hudson River between New York City and Greenbush, New York, across the river from Albany, New York. The line opened in 1851. The company came under the control of Cornelius Vanderbilt in 1867, and was merged with the first New York Central Railroad in 1869 to create the New York Central and Hudson River Railroad. That company became the second New York Central Railroad in 1914. The Hudson River Railroad's main line remains an important part of the Hudson Line.

== History ==
Discussion of a railroad line along the east bank of the Hudson River began in 1832. Steamboats plied the Hudson between New York City and Albany, New York, but could not operate in the winter months when the river froze. Organization of what became the Hudson River Railroad began in Poughkeepsie, New York, in 1846, against opposition from steamboat companies and the competing New York and Harlem Railroad. The company was incorporated on May 1, 1846, but not fully organized until March 4, 1847.

The southern terminus of the line was on Manhattan. New York forbade the use of steam locomotives below 30th Street, requiring horse-drawn power from that point. The original terminal was at Chambers Street and Broadway, in what is now Tribeca. The line opened between there and Poughkeepsie on December 31, 1849. (Note: Hart asserts that a ferry was used on the Harlem River until the completion of the original Spuyten Duyvil Bridge in 1853. Adams gives a date of 1848 for the completion of the bridge. Harlow does not discuss the question.) Through service north to Albany was via stagecoach or the steamboats of Daniel Drew's People's Line. The Hudson River Railroad leased the Troy and Greenbush Railroad on June 1, 1851, and completed the line from Poughkeepsie to Greenbush on October 1.

Until 1866 the nearest crossing of the Hudson was at Troy, New York, via the Troy and Greenbush Railroad and the Rensselaer and Saratoga Railroad. The Hudson River Railroad collaborated with the New York Central Railroad and Western Railroad to found the Hudson River Bridge Company, with the goal of crossing the Hudson at Albany. The bridge was completed on February 18, 1866.

Cornelius Vanderbilt, steamship operator and owner of the New York and Harlem Railroad, gained control of the Hudson River Railroad in 1864. A struggle now developed around Albany involving the Hudson River Railroad, the New York Central Railroad, and Daniel Drew, who in addition to his rival steamship company was developing the Saratoga and Hudson River Railroad on the west bank of the Hudson. The New York Central, Saratoga and Hudson River Railroad, and People's Line would collaborate to divert freight from the Hudson River Railroad. Henry Keep took control of the New York Central in December 1866 and cancelled various agreements with the Hudson River Railroad. Vanderbilt retaliated by refusing all passengers and freight from the New York Central, "passengers had to cross the frozen Hudson on foot."

Vanderbilt took control of the New York Central in December 1867. The two companies were consolidated on November 1, 1869, to create the New York Central and Hudson River Railroad.
