= Atlantic Express (bus company) =

American bus operation company

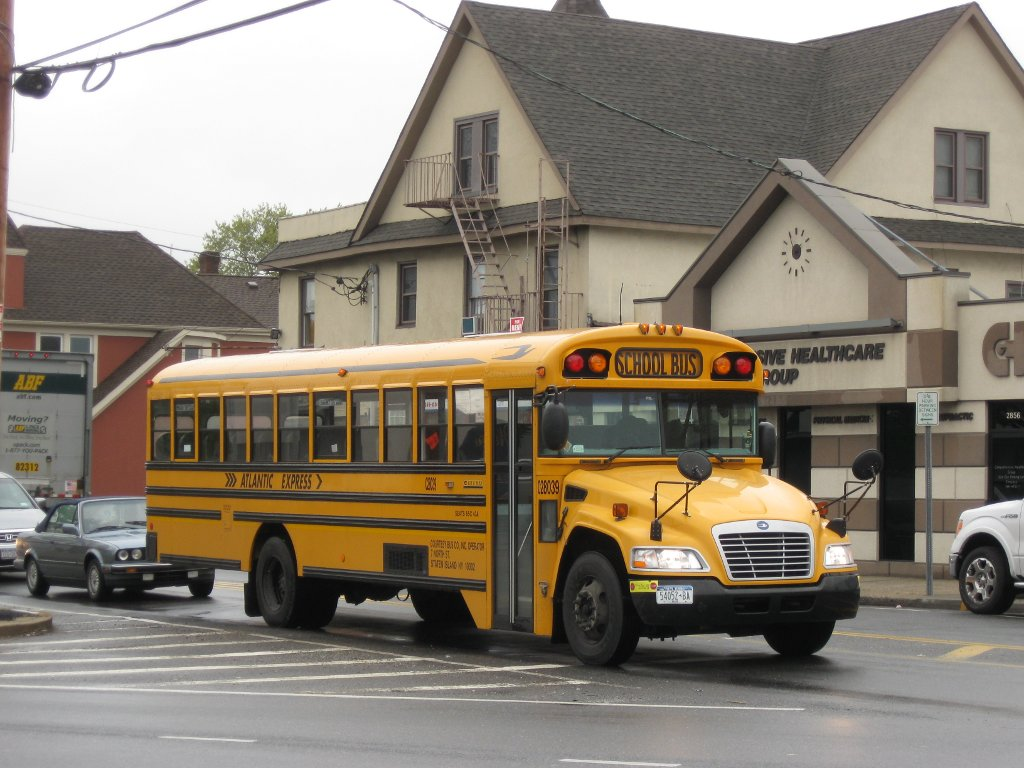
- An Atlantic Express school bus operates through Oceanside, New York.
- Parent: Atlantic Express Transportation Group
- Founded: 1964
- Defunct: January 2014
- Headquarters: 7 North Street; Staten Island, NY

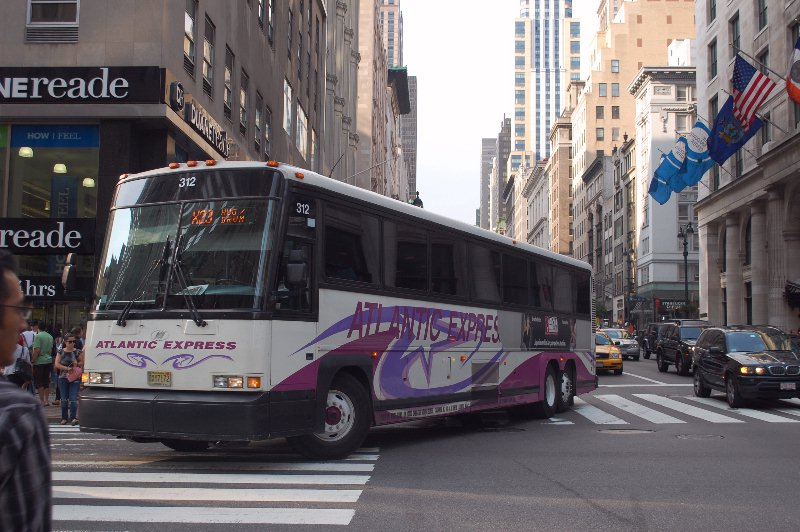
Atlantic Express #312 seen operating Staten Island bound on the X23 route at Fifth Avenue and 34th Street in June 2011.

Atlantic Express was an operator of transit buses, paratransit and school buses in the United States, specializing primarily in school bus service, while operating transit buses in New York City. At the time of its closure, Atlantic Express was the fifth largest school bus operator in the United States and Canada, behind First Student/First Student Canada, Durham School Services, Student Transportation of America, and the New York City-area Metropolitan Transportation Authority's bus division (to which Atlantic Express had been a contractor).

== Bankruptcy ==
In late 2013, Atlantic Express declared Chapter 11 bankruptcy. Part of the Bankruptcy was that Atlantic Express lost approximately 100 buses due to the devastating Superstorm Sandy on October 29, 2012. In order to help with replacing the damaged buses, Bird Bus Sales had a 100 bus emergency order that consisted of 100 2014 Blue Bird Visions that would be donated to Atlantic Express so they would not have to waste a single penny to pay for the buses.

In New York City, Atlantic Express operated two express bus routes under contract to the New York City Economic Development Corporation, the X23 and X24 from Staten Island to Manhattan, sharing the same fare structure as all express buses operated by the Metropolitan Transportation Authority. The operating rights to these routes were awarded to Academy Bus in bankruptcy proceedings, although most of the coach fleet was excluded from the sale.

Under the name Hudson Rail Link, Atlantic Express had operated ten bus-to-rail shuttle routes in The Bronx, under contract to Metro-North, to Riverdale and Spuyten Duyvil stations on the Hudson Line. The Hudson Rail Link contract was awarded to Logan Bus Company in bankruptcy proceedings.

== School bus service ==
In addition to fixed route service, Atlantic Express also served approximately 104 school districts in five states with yellow school bus service, primarily in the Northeast. Atlantic Express at its peak had operations in twelve states, but had significantly downsized and had exited the mid-western and southwestern United States, and Florida well before its closure.

Many school bus providers took over the contracts and bought the buses that Atlantic Express had serviced following its bankruptcy filing. These companies are, but are not limited to:

- Adelwerth Bus Corp.
- All American School Bus Corp.
- Allied Transit Corp.
- Baumann Bus Company
- Bella Bus Corp.
- Brooklyn Transportation Corp.
- Consolidated Bus Transit
- Educational Bus Inc.
- Guardian Bus Company Inc.
- Empire State Bus Corp.
- L&M Bus Corp.
- New Dawn Transit
- Pride Transportation Services
- Quality Transportation Corp.
- Rainbow Transit
- Suffolk Transportation Services
