= 1882 Spuyten Duyvil train wreck =

Rear-end collision in the Bronx, New York City

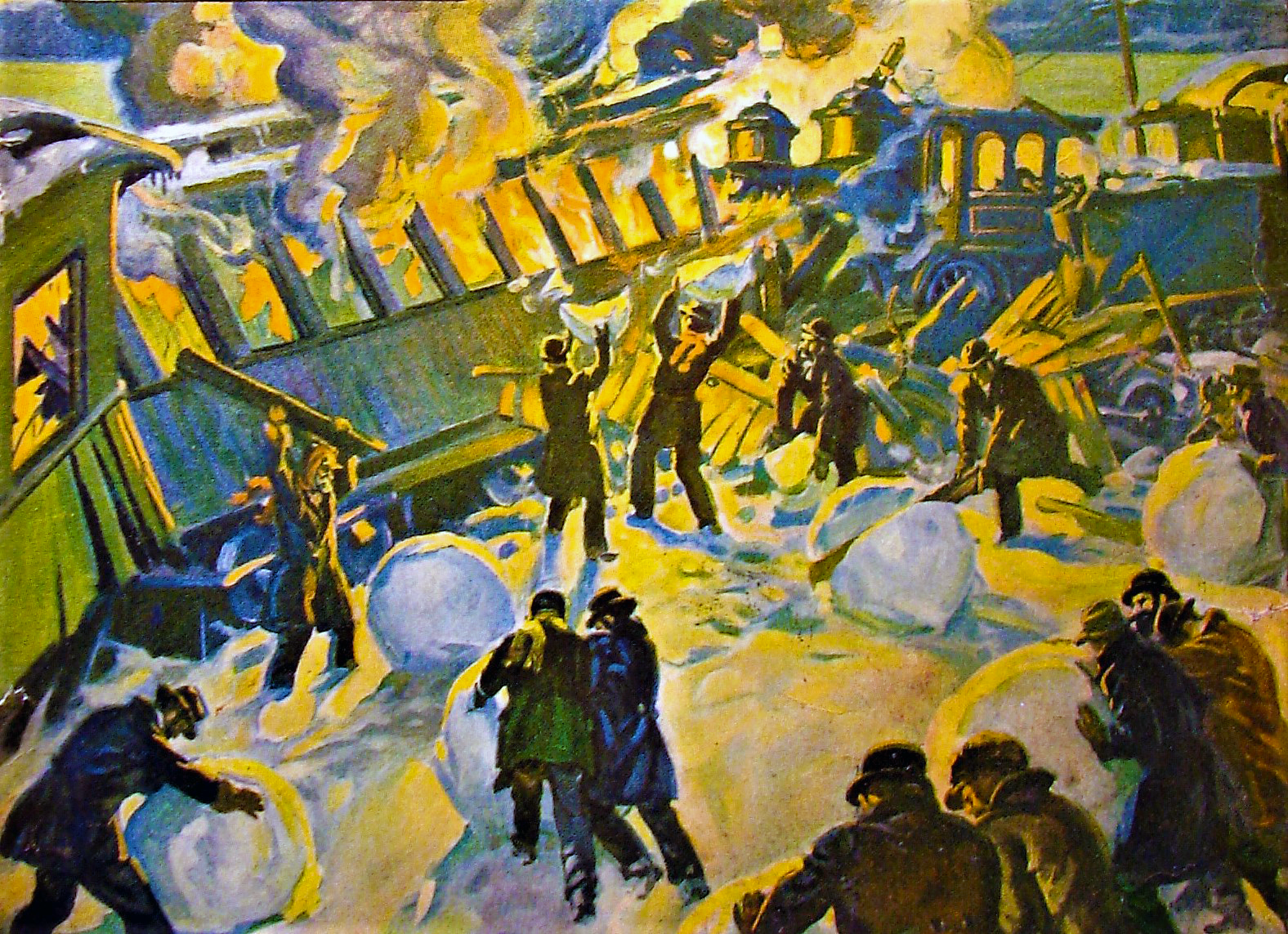
- 1935 Railroad Stories cover illustration of attempts to put out fire with snowballs

Details
- Date: January 13, 1882; 7:12 p.m.
- Location: Spuyten Duyvil, Bronx, New York City
- Coordinates: 40.8765°N 73.9172°W
- Country: United States
- Line: Hudson River Railroad
- Owner: New York Central
- Service: Western Express
- Incident type: Rear-end collision
- Cause: Failure to properly signal oncoming train

Statistics
- Trains: 2
- Passengers: 500
- Deaths: 8
- Injured: 19
- Missing: 3

On the evening of January 13, 1882, a southbound New York Central passenger train crashed into the rear of another one stopped on the tracks along Spuyten Duyvil Creek in the similarly named neighborhood of the New York City borough of The Bronx. Eight people were killed, and 19 seriously injured, by the crash and fires afterwards, fires that neighborhood residents and crew extinguished by rolling large snowballs into them until local firefighters arrived. Among the dead was State Senator Webster Wagner, inventor of the sleeping cars used on the train, between two of which he was crushed to death, and a newlywed couple who died together after the bride refused to leave her trapped husband. It was the deadliest rail accident in New York City at that time, remaining so for another 20 years. (Note: Technically, the 1893 Long Island Rail Road collision that killed 16 was not a New York City disaster at the time it occurred since Maspeth, Queens, where it occurred, was not yet part of the city. The Park Avenue Tunnel Crash in 1902 killed 15.)

The stopped train was an express from Chicago carrying at least 500, including other state legislators who had boarded at Albany that afternoon to return to their districts in the city for the weekend. While accounts of the accident initially reported that the express was stopped due to a failed brake, it was later revealed that a drunken legislator (never identified) decided to pull the emergency brake. A coroner's jury later blamed the crash primarily on the express train's conductor and rear brakeman. Both were indicted and charged with manslaughter; the brakeman, who testified that he was illiterate and could not read the company rulebook, was later acquitted.

The wreck led the railroad to discontinue the use of mineral oil to light cars at night. While the railroad had long before switched from stoves as heat for car interiors to the hot water-based Baker process, that had not yet been perfected and was believed to have contributed to the fires after the crash. Innovations in train heating system design accelerated afterwards.

== Trains ==
The New York Central and Hudson River Railroad's Atlantic Express, originating in Chicago, arrived at Albany's Union Station already 23 minutes late due to snowy weather on the afternoon of January 13, 1882. It would be delayed further as so many tickets had been sold as to require 15 additional cars added to the train, and a second steam locomotive, so the train could make up the lost time. When it left at 3:06 p.m. it was running 26 minutes behind schedule. Its consist was, after the locomotives and added cars, two mail cars, a baggage car, four coaches and five luxury sleeper cars. Just across the Hudson River, at Greenbush (today Rensselaer), a sixth sleeper was coupled to the rear of the train, the Idlewild, the personal car of Republican state Senator Webster Wagner.

Among the approximately 500 passengers were other state legislators, (Note: Accounts vary as to how many. Edwards, in his 1935 Railroad Stories article, said there were 77, while a contemporary account in Frank Leslie's Illustrated News states that there were 36.) from both houses and both parties (with most Democrats part of New York City's Tammany Hall political machine), returning to their homes downstate for the weekend with the legislature having adjourned. They were traveling on free passes issued them by the railroad, which sought their continued goodwill. Also aboard were John M. Toucey, superintendent for the line between New York and Buffalo, and Charles Bissell, superintendent for the division between Albany and New York. The legislators were mostly grouped together in the first four cars, where with freely available liquor the 142-mile (229 km) trip down the Hudson Valley soon took on a festive atmosphere.

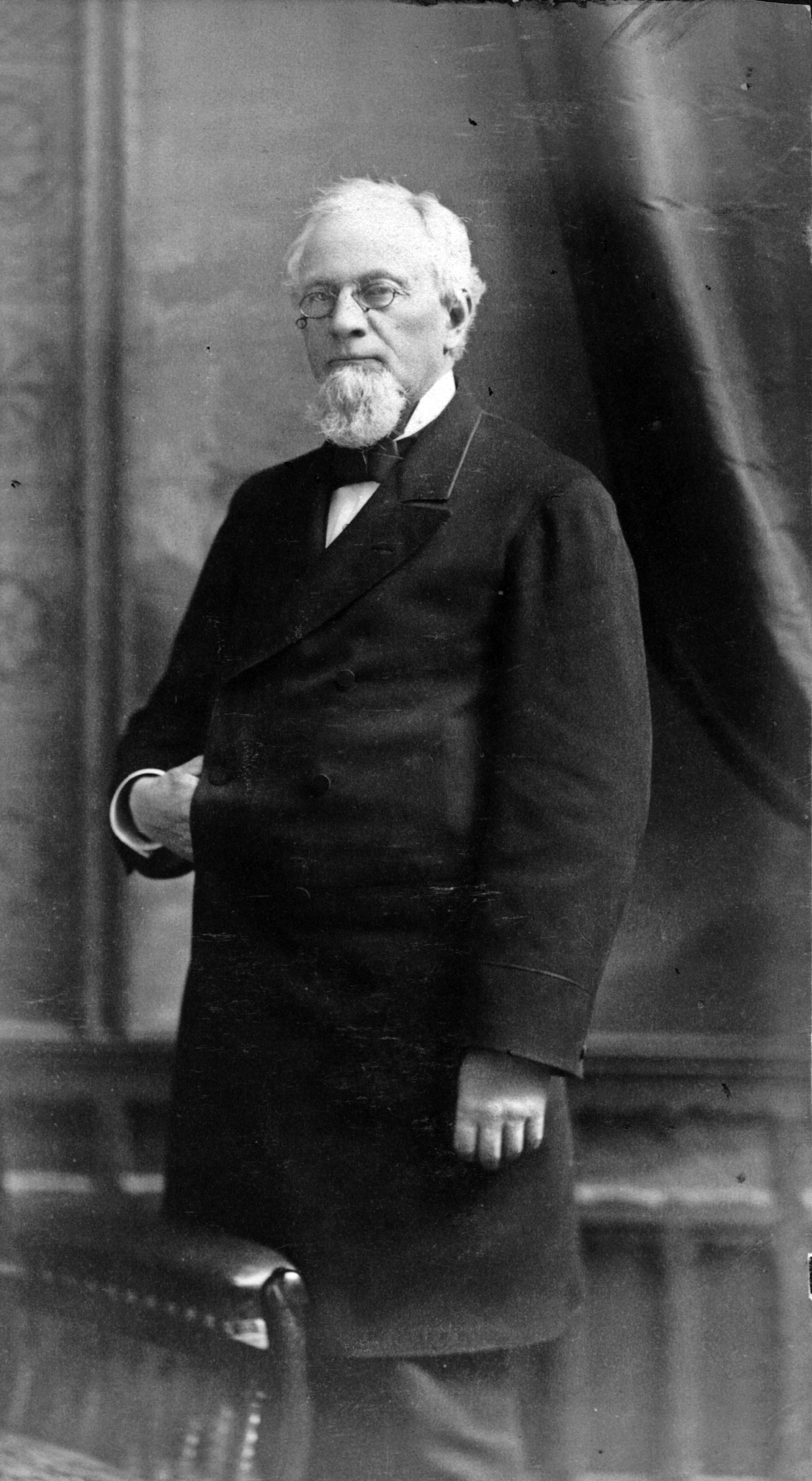
Wagner shortly before the crash

Wagner was the subject of particular interest to the reporters accompanying the politicians. He had founded the Wagner Palace Drawing-Car Company, which had built the sleepers on the rear of the train, all of which had cost the railroad $17,000 ($567,000 in 2025). There was speculation that Wagner and the Pullman Company, its bitter rival, were about to conclude a merger that would create a $12.5 million ($417 million in 2025) company that would effectively monopolize the sleeping-car market and make Wagner and other shareholders wealthier than they already were. Asked repeatedly about the rumored deal, Wagner demurred, preferring to recount for the journalists gathered around him his story of how he had built the company over the preceding three decades from his home in Palatine Bridge, west of Albany in the Mohawk Valley, after seeing how the railroad needlessly lost business to river ferries with sleeping quarters.

By 6:15 p.m. the express, stopping only at Hudson and Poughkeepsie, had made up much of the time it had lost before and at Albany. As it passed through Tarrytown, a waiting local, also bound for Grand Central Depot in Midtown Manhattan, had to delay its own scheduled departure five minutes to allow the express to clear the station. The local's engineer, Frank Burr, and fireman Patrick Quinn, recalled that the express was traveling fast. They left the station at 6:40.

The local made its stops along the Hudson south of Tarrytown, reaching Spuyten Duyvil, 14 miles (23 km) away, where the line turns southeast to follow the creek of that name. It stopped there at 7:04 p.m. Burr believed at this time that there was 13 minutes of headroom between his train and the Atlantic Express.

2023 view from front of train going through Rolling Mill Cut at 20 mph

But the express had stopped on the tracks less than a mile to the east. George Hanford, its conductor, said one of the inebriated legislators pulled the emergency brake, stopping the train as it rounded another bend that took it along the banks of the creek towards Tibbetts Brook, (Note: This curve no longer exists; the track to the east has been straightened out.) apparently because he thought it would be funny. (Note: A Southern Central employee writing a letter to The Railway Age Monthly And Rail Service Journal used similar phrasing: "... it is strongly intimated that the party responsible for this was a drunken legislator who thought it would be the funniest thing in the world to pull the brake cord at the side of the coach.") Between the train's location and the Spuyten Duyvil station the tracks ran through Rolling Mill Cut, which obstructed the view of the track beyond in either direction, a stretch Hanford considered particularly dangerous since the curve at the north end of the cut was further obstructed by Kilcullen's, a local hotel and tavern. The railroad had long had flagmen at both ends of the cut for safety reasons, but had recently laid off the one who watched the south end, closer to where the train was stopped, in order to economize. The flagman at the other end did not know there was a stopped train beyond the far end of the cut.

== Collision ==
At the time the express stopped, Wagner was in the Empire, the sleeper car in front of the last car, talking with some other legislators. After the stop, he excused himself to take a look around the train, saying "These confounded railroads have a passion for smashing up my best cars" before he went into the Idlewild. It was the last thing anyone remembered him saying.

Up front, engineer Edward Stanford attempted to restart the train. He was briefly successful, but only mustered enough power to break the drawbar connecting the two locomotives. His second engineer tried to recharge the brake. The 75 pounds per square inch (520 kPa) of pressure the air cylinder had had going into the turn out of the cut had dropped to 40 (280 kPa) after the brake had been pulled; he had tried to pump them off. Recharging the cylinder would take at least 15 minutes.

At the rear, Melius, the brakeman, left the train with a red and white lantern to warn any oncoming trains to stop. He began walking down the track toward the cut and the Spuyten Duyvil station. How long after the stop he left the vicinity of the train, and how far he went were later matters of dispute. By Melius's account he was six or seven car lengths from the train when he saw the headlight and heard the whistle of the oncoming local train's locomotive. He began frantically waving his red lantern across the track.

Burr saw the lantern and immediately applied his brake. He saw the rear of the express, and knew there was not enough time or space to stop the local. At 7:12 p.m. its locomotive collided with the Idlewild, embedding itself about 12 feet (4 m) and making the car telescope into the one ahead, making a sound audible within a half-mile (800 m) radius. When it finally stopped, Burr, uninjured, got out and began assisting with rescue efforts.

== Rescue efforts ==
Since it was a Friday night, Kilcullen's tavern was busy; many of those present were workers at a nearby foundry. Some patrons outside in the mild weather for that time of year (around 35 °F (2 °C)) had witnessed the crash, and they brought others from the bar and the neighborhood to offer aid and rescue victims, with the help of crew and unhurt or minimally injured survivors. James Kilcullen himself offered the train crew the use of the shutters from his building as stretchers.

Burr saw that the locomotive's boiler was damaged and might explode. He took the shovel from his fireman and began shoveling snow into the furnace to douse the fire. Rescuers who had carried water to the wreck from the nearby creek in order to put out the blaze consuming the wrecked sleepers likewise, realizing the more imminent danger, followed Burr's lead and began throwing it on the outside of the boiler. Soon the fire in the firebox was extinguished, and the rescuers' attention turned to the fire in the sleepers, from which screams of those trapped within could be heard.

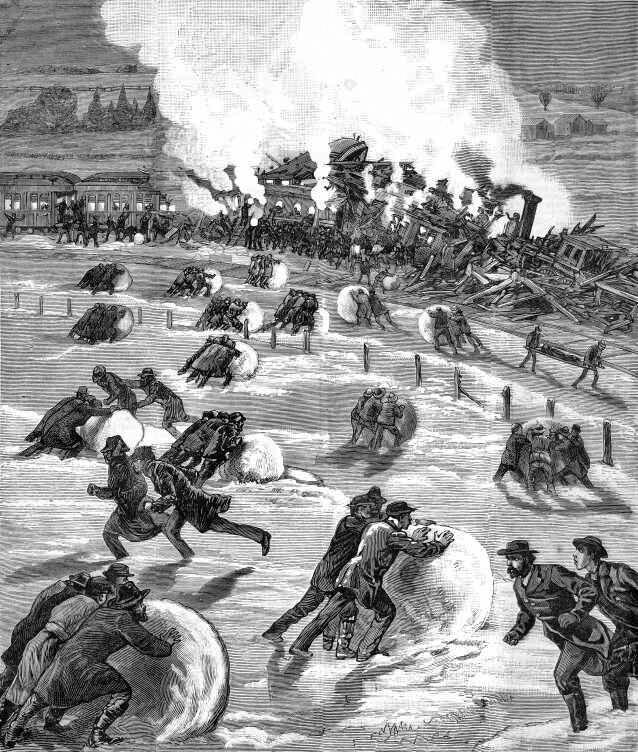
Contemporary illustration of rescuers rolling snowballs to fight fire in the wreck

Although he had been severely burned on his face and arms in the collision, Hanford took charge. Noticing that there was little water left and that what water was being thrown on the flames was having no effect, he shouted for the rescuers to throw snow on the fire instead. He began to roll a huge ball of snow from the ground toward the wreck, and others followed his lead. As they began throwing their large snowballs on the burning sleepers, other rescuers began extricating the dead and injured. They, too, had snow and water thrown on them to offset the heat so they could get the victims out. Within a short time all the snow had been scraped from the ground around the crashed cars.

The local's locomotive's headlight remained lit, which along with the continued illumination in the front of the Empire allowed the removal of all present there before the car was completely engulfed in flames. Some died shortly afterwards. Rescuers used axes to break open the cars. Assemblyman J.W. Monk was psychologically overcome after being extricated from the ceiling timbers he had been trapped in. Inside the car, as the fire grew worse, Hanford attempted to rescue a young newlywed, Mary Louise Valentine (née Gaylord). Her husband, whom she had married the night before in Massachusetts, was still alive as well but so trapped in the wreckage as to make rescue impossible in what time was left. By contrast, only some of her clothing was caught, but she refused Hanford's entreaties to remove it and escape, and he did not have the time to force her to since it was so hot.

Wagner's body was found crushed between the two cars. Like many of the dead, (Note: While initial reporting suggested that all the dead had been killed on impact, before the fire started, by the following day it was apparent that, like Gaylord, many of them besides Wagner had survived the crash itself only to succumb to the flames.) it was burnt beyond recognition. He was identified by a gold watch with the initials "W.W.", his diary and several slips of paper with the election returns from his state senate district. Another victim was alive when removed from the train, but so seriously injured that they died shortly afterwards. Firefighters soon arrived with a pumper to put out the fire, and the injured were taken to Bellevue Hospital after being laid out on billiards tables at Kilcullen's along with the dead; two rival undertakers from Yonkers fought over who should take the bodies. Hundreds of people came to look at the site, Bissell and Toucey stayed on scene to oversee the cleanup, and by 4 a.m. the track was reopened.

Estimates of the fatalities that night were initially as high as nine; later accounts put it at seven or eight. Three passengers were unaccounted for. A surviving woman was injured seriously enough to make doctors doubt she could be saved, until her condition began to improve the following day. Another 17 passengers suffered minor injuries, including Brooklyn state senator John C. Jacobs. Two days after the accident, the number of unaccounted for was reduced by two Assemblymen: Jaques J. Stillwell and Albert M. Patterson. The former was reported to be safe at his home in the Brooklyn neighborhood of Gravesend, and the latter at his home in the upstate town of Geneva, having never boarded the train in the first place.

Among the other fatalities besides Wagner and the newlyweds were a French priest returning to New York from Troy to return to his earlier-held position as chaplain of the workhouse on Blackwell's Island (today Roosevelt Island), businessmen from Brooklyn and Philadelphia and the wife of a Manhattan stockbroker. The coffin with Wagner's body was placed on a specially decorated car and taken back to Palatine Bridge for burial. A disembodied hand found at the scene could not be matched to any of the bodies recovered.

Other than the two completely wrecked and burnt sleepers, damage to property was minimal. The local's locomotive incurred $50 ($1,000 in 2024) worth of repairs. Along the tracks, one tie had been broken; it was ripped up and replaced by morning.

== Investigation ==
Sidney Nichols, one of the city's police commissioners, who had been on the train, limped into his office, applauded by employees, the next morning. He said he had sprained a wrist and ankle. At the crash site, investigators quickly established that the local's brakes were in good working order. Crewmembers blamed Melius, the brakeman, for the accident, as they believed he had not gone far enough down the track to properly signal the oncoming local. Melius had left the scene and could not be found. Residents of the area faulted the railroad for having laid off one of the flagmen in the cut, who could otherwise have alerted the local earlier. Despite a low death toll compared to other rail accidents of the era, the crash was widely covered in the press nationally, due to Wagner's death and the many other politicians on board.

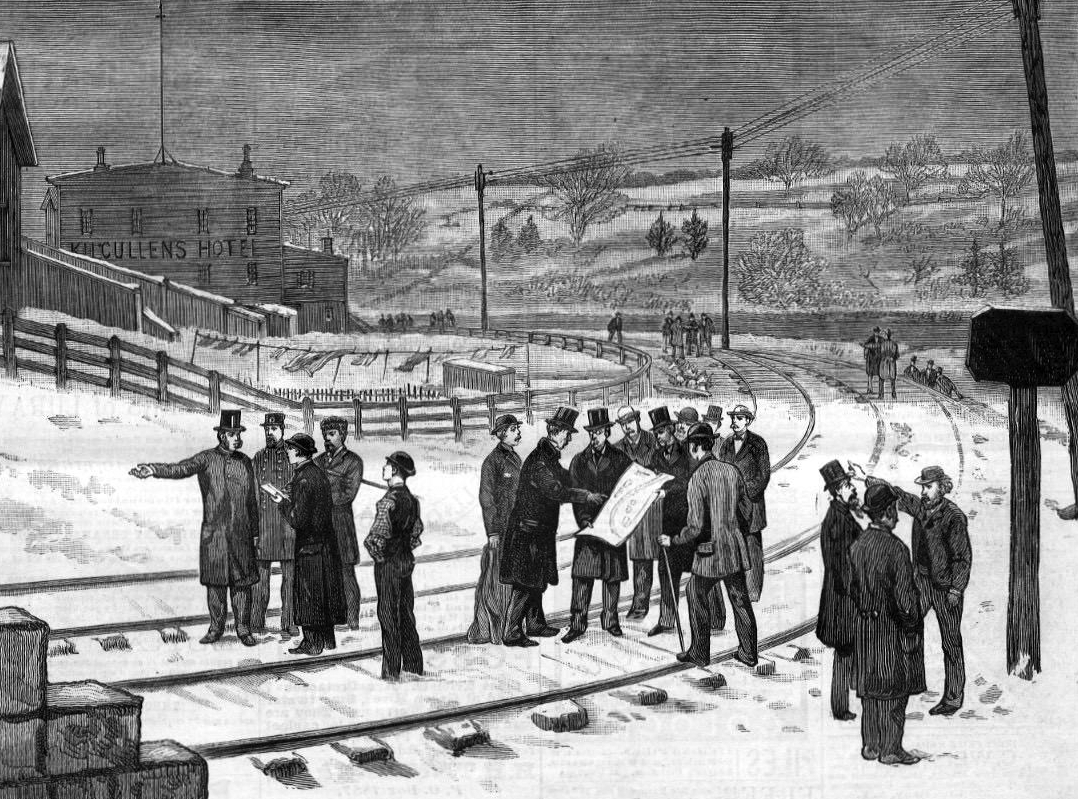
A contemporary illustration showing the coroner's jury at the site of the wreck

Melius resurfaced in Poughkeepsie the following day. Accompanied by his brother, a conductor on the Central who was based in that city, he surrendered to authorities and was returned to New York to testify before the coroner's jury. His account was subject to heavy scrutiny as it was contradicted by other witnesses.

On his brother's advice, Melius changed one aspect of his story. He revised his estimate of the local's speed downward, as the older Melius had told him it could not have reached 40 mph (64 km/h) so soon after leaving Spuyten Duyvil. But that was not enough to restore his credibility. He held to his claim that he was far enough behind the express at the time that he could see the Spuyten Duyvil Bridge. The dispatcher at Spuyten Duyvil said that if Melius had been able to see the bridge, the remaining flagman at the north end of the cut would have been able to see Melius's lantern.

Alonzo Valentine, whose newlywed son and daughter-in-law had perished at each other's side when she refused to remove her clothes to escape, said that he had gone onto the open rear of the Idlewild after the stop, where he saw a brakeman with a red and white lantern leaning against the back of the car. Valentine then re-entered the car for another five minutes; when he went back out the brakeman was standing about 10 feet (3 m) from it when the local appeared around the curve. At that point the brakeman began running towards it and was at most 50 ft (15 m) from the rear of the Idlewild before he had to get out of the way; Valentine survived by jumping off the train.

Burr gave the locomotive's speed as around 20 mph (32 km/h) as it went into the cut. He recalled no warning of any kind as it passed through. He saw Melius waving the lanterns at the same time as he saw the rear of the stopped express. Burr estimated that three and a half car lengths separated it from his locomotive. Melius seemed about two of those car lengths ahead, and about 35 ft (11 m) in front of the express. Two witnesses who saw the wreck from just outside Kilcullen's also described Melius as having stood near the express for about five minutes after it stopped and only running down the track as the local came around the curve.

Melius allowed that he had only stayed beside the train for two minutes, then began walking down the track. It took him five minutes to get to the point where he saw the express, he said. When the jury had him re-enact that walk as part of the investigation, it only took him two minutes. Judge James Angell of the state's Tenth District Court had been in the third car from the rear, and estimated that at least 10 minutes elapsed between the stop and the crash, more than enough time for a man on foot to have gotten as far as the Spuyten Duyvil station if he had left the train immediately following the stop.

Toucey said that the rules of the railroad required that in the event of an unscheduled stop, brakemen were to immediately go out and walk down the track as flagmen to warn oncoming trains. The rules were printed on the back of every employee timetable; he did not see how Melius could have been unaware of it. He said Hanford had in fact ordered Melius to do so, however Hanford said that he was several cars ahead of Melius in the train at the time of the collision and, while he saw the brakeman leave the train, lanterns in hand, he did not order Melius to go back down toward the station. Instead Hanford assumed that because Melius was leaving the train that he was doing so on his own initiative.

The coroner's jury found Melius and Hanford responsible for the crash and referred the case to a grand jury with the recommendation that charges be brought. Both men were indicted by the coroner's jury on a single count of fourth-degree manslaughter—Melius for failing to go down the track and Hanford for not having ordered him to do so—with Wagner being the representative victim. In addition, it assigned responsibility to Toucey for scheduling trains so closely together as to make it impossible for them to pass through Rolling Mill Cut at speeds low enough to ensure safe stopping distance. Burr, it said, should have been able to see Melius and did not. Stanford, the express's engineer, also contributed by trying to draw down the brakes while they were still applied. They were arrested two weeks after the accident and released after posting $5,000 ($140,000 in 2024) in bond each.

Since one of their own had died in the crash, the State Senate constituted its own special committee to investigate it. It echoed the railroad in finding Melius the responsible party.

=== Fire ===
There was also a question about what had started the fire that had caused most of the deaths. Like most railroads of the era, the Central had reacted to public and governmental pressure in the wake of previous crashes where deaths were attributed to preventable fires and taken steps to reduce the risk. It had installed the Baker process heating system, in which a closed boiler at one end heated hot water piped around the walls of the car, in the luxury sleepers in place of stoves. But light in the car was provided by mineral oil lamps, which the railroad had migrated to from candles a year and a half earlier, even though candles had a lower fire risk in crashes since the force of impact tended to extinguish them, because the traveling public liked the light better, the railroad said.

The railroad maintained that the heating system could not have caused the fire. Hanford disagreed, noting that the fire had been concentrated closest to the rear of the train, with none at all around the boiler at the front of the car. He also believed the oil lamps had exacerbated the problem. A passenger who had been standing next to Valentine as the local came into view but chose to run into the train instead of jumping (an action which led to him mistakenly being presumed to have died at first) corroborated Hanford's account, recalling the fire after the wreck was fiercest closer to the end of the train.

=== Press reaction ===
New York's newspapers had a mixed reaction to the jury's findings. "[It] is so sweeping as to be absolutely worthless for any public purpose and entirely to defeat its own object", complained the New York World. It needed no further convincing as to Melius's guilt, but could not understand how Hanford could be seen as responsible in any way. The Herald, too, found the verdict paradoxical: "It is evidently the opinion of the coroner's jury in the Spuyten Duyvil case that somebody is to blame, though the sweeping generality of their inculpation of almost everybody mentioned in connection with the calamity seems to us likely to lead to about the same result as if they had found the ancient verdict of nobody to blame", it opined. "They do find, in fact, that it is nobody in particular." Some of the contradictions noted were that if the schedule were at fault, then where Melius was on the track would have mattered less, and if he had not gotten farther down the track, how could Burr have been expected to see him in time? If he had gotten that far, had he not in fact performed the duty he was charged with manslaughter for neglecting?

The Railway Age Monthly And Rail Service Magazine, an industry trade publication, found charges justified against both the "inexcusably careless" Melius but Hanford, too, since he had the time and the duty to ensure that Melius went the required half-mile (800 m) from the train. "If the rule had been strictly obeyed, the accident would not have occurred." It further faulted Stanford for the long stop (unless it were found to have been impossible to release the brakes).

The New York Times praised the verdict and the jury for their thoroughness and intelligence. "[The] verdict is presented in a manner not to be mistaken" it wrote, and lamented that the law did not presently allow the railroad's executives to be charged criminally. Similarly, the Evening Telegram called the jury "conscientious and courageous", adding that it had been "a long time since the officers and managers of a company have been so pointedly censured".

Railway Age defended the executives, noting that the Central had a particularly strong reputation in the industry for following safety procedures and had not had an accident this serious in a long time. "No matter what the cause of an accident, it is always the custom to charge it upon the general officers of the road, notwithstanding that they are far more interested in the safe movement of their trains than the newspaper writer can be." It took particular umbrage at the Herald's suggestion that the operating workers like Hanford and Melius be paid more than management since their jobs were so important to the lives of travelers and coworkers, calling that idea "sentimental but ridiculous". Admitting that brakemen and signalmen were among the lowest paid employees, the magazine said "we should be glad to see them paid more, but no matter what their compensation, having accepted their position their duty is to act as faithfully as if they were receiving the president's salary." Later it noted that the coroner's jury had not inquired as to which legislator had pulled the emergency brake, which it said should come as a relief to bitter critics of the industry who advocated for its nationalization, since "they should not like to admit that governmental control would mean placing the lives of travelers at the mercy of such officials as this drunken legislator."

== Trial ==
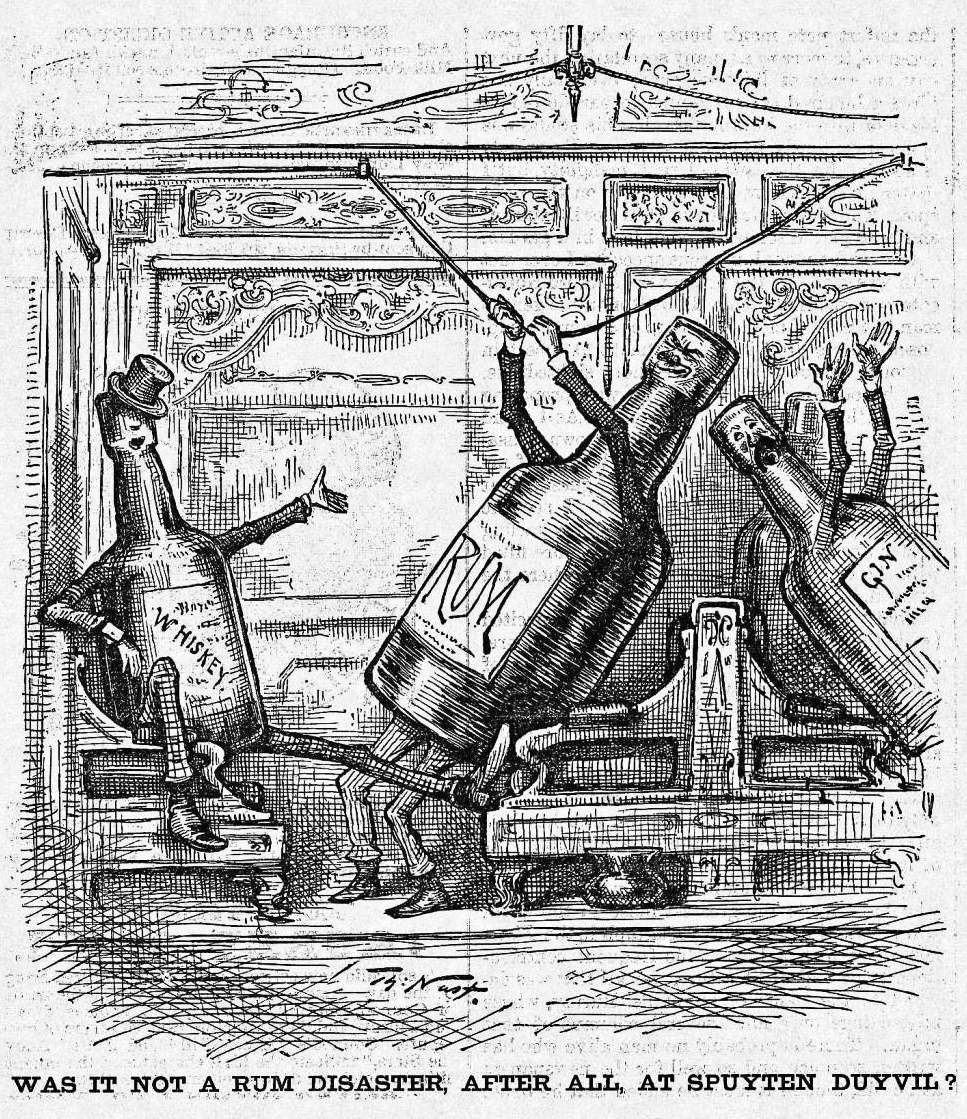
Thomas Nast cartoon of "rum and politicians" as the cause of the wreck in Harper's Weekly

The pair were tried in late November. Melius, his guilt already a foregone conclusion and his trial a mere formality in the public eye, was represented by Robert A. Livingston, a former assemblyman who had been a passenger on the express that night himself, and H.T. Marston. Hanford repeated his account that he had seen Melius behind the train after the collision; on cross-examination he said that he had not ordered Melius to go down the track because he believed Melius was already doing that when he saw him outside the train. He also restated his earlier opinion that the primary cause of the accident had been "rum and politicians".

Toucey and Bissell both testified that it was a brakeman's duty to go back down the tracks in the event of an unscheduled stop in order to warn approaching trains. He emphasized that it was stated on the back of the bulletins regularly distributed to employees. On cross, Livingston asked him what benefit that might be in the case of an employee who could not read. "If there is such a man," the superintendent responded, "he ought to leave the employ of the road". He did not know of any.

Melius took the stand in his own defense. He said that while he could not read, his wife had read the rules to him several times and he understood his duty in that situation to be that in the event of a stop he was to stay near the rear of the train until ordered to go down the track by the conductor, and that Hanford had told him such (which Hanford denied when called in rebuttal, saying it would have been against company policy). (Note: Melius was apparently not unusual among brakemen at the time in honoring that policy mainly in the breach. They were usually the lowest-paid and least experienced members of the crew, and more often than not the time spent protecting the train this way turned out to be unnecessary, the delay aggravated by the time taken for the flagman to return to the train. The importance railroads placed on on-time service often led to those responsible for lengthy delays getting fired, only to be hired by another railroad unaware of their previous work issues, the turnover exacerbating the issues as well.) On the night of the crash, he had been standing at the front platform on the rear car when the train stopped. After exiting the train, he inspected the brakes and found it necessary to bleed some air off. Then, after waiting for Hanford to tell him what to do for a few minutes, he went down the tracks on his own. Due to the darkness and the ice and snow accumulated on the tracks, the going was slow and he slipped off into a culvert at one point. (Note: Rail engineer Arthur M. Wellington, a critic of the rule requiring brakemen to run down the track as flagmen in the event of an unscheduled stop, for the reasons discussed above, noted that rear-end collisions such as Spuyten Duyvil were more common in winter not only because of the issues created by the weather that Melius complained of but also because winter conditions necessitated more frequent such stops.) He estimated that he had gotten about 140 ft (43 m) from the train when he saw the flagman there and attempted to alert him, but did not know if the flagman saw his signal before the local came around the bend.

When charging the jury, Judge Noah Davis noted that this was possibly the first case in which a railroad employee had been criminally indicted over the deaths of passengers in an accident. (Note: Perhaps it was, in New York. After the Great Train Wreck of 1856, the surviving conductor was tried and acquitted of manslaughter in a Pennsylvania court.) He framed the question for them as to whether Hanford had given Melius the order not to leave the train's side until instructed otherwise. The prosecution argued in its closing that Melius had failed to perform a duty he knew he had to. In response the defense said that he had been given too many conflicting instructions in the absence of which, free to do his job as he had for 25 years, the accident could have been prevented. It argued the Central's executives were the ones who had really failed the victims, and should have been on trial instead.

The jury returned in a half hour with a not guilty verdict, to the surprise of most present.

== Legacy and aftermath ==
The coroner's jury also made some recommendations to the railroad and lawmakers:

- Mineral oil should no longer be used to fuel lighting in cars,
- all cars should be converted to steam- or hot water-based heating from coal-fired stoves,
- the automatic block signalling system in use closer to Grand Central be extended further along the line,
- flagmen be required at all times at either end of any cut or curve where visibility was limited,
- all rail employees be required to prove their literacy,
- trains be required to have crews commensurate with their length in cars,
- water buckets, axes and other emergency firefighting tools be stocked on every train,
- and lastly, that railroads be prohibited from giving passes to elected officials.

The state senate's committee also recommended expanding the regulatory ambit of the state's railroad commission, which the full body did the following year. The call for increased use of steam or hot-water heat led to increase in innovations. Patent applications for such systems, which had fallen off after a spike following the 1876 Ashtabula River railroad disaster in Ohio, the deadliest rail disaster in the country at that time, where coal-fired stoves had triggered the fires that killed many of the 92 victims, rose again, with 16 filed in 1883.

Writers in Railroad Gazette, a trade publication which had advocated in the wake of the wreck for many of the same measures as the coroner's jury, particularly the implementation of block signalling, took up the issues raised by the crash in a March issue. A brake inspector with the Massachusetts Central refuted an alternative theory as to why the express had come to a sudden stop where it did, that the brakes had "crept" on, explaining how safeguards in the system made that highly unlikely to happen on such a long train. Another writer shared his plan for how automatic block signalling could work, and a third proposed that the rules requiring brakemen to go out with flags or lanterns as Melius was supposed to also require that torpedoes be placed on the tracks at the farthest point from the train reached by the brakeman as he began his return to the train.

A year after the wreck, Melius was seen by someone who knew him and had been a witness to the wreck working as a horsecar driver in Manhattan. He had apparently grown out his facial hair considerably to conceal his appearance. Hanford continued to work for the Central until his death in a 1908 accident near Castleton, south of Albany, at 70.

It had also been suggested that the railroad straighten the course of the track and eliminate the curve. It did not do so, citing the cost of building two causeways over the creek and laying new track through Marble Hill to the east. The construction of the Harlem River Ship Canal in 1895 made a level route possible, and 20 years later the meander of Spuyten Duyvil Creek that had necessitated the curve up to Kingsbridge station was filled in. The track was straightened out and realigned along the river while the Central converted the land around the former mouth, where the crash had happened, into a freight yard. In 1968 the city took possession of the land, the tracks were removed, and John F. Kennedy High School was built on the property.

The eight killed in the wreck stood as the deadliest rail accident in New York City until another rear-end collision in the Park Avenue Tunnel took 15 lives almost 20 years to the day from the Spuyten Duyvil wreck. In the interim yet another collision on the Long Island Rail Road in Maspeth, Queens, killed 16 in 1893, but Queens was not yet part of New York City then.

== See also ==
- 1882 in rail transport
- 1882 in the United States
- List of American railroad accidents
- List of rail accidents (1880–1889)
- List of disasters in New York City by death toll
- Kew Gardens train crash, 1950 rear-end collision in New York City caused by signaling error, killing 78, making it the deadliest surface rail accident in the city and state
- July 2013 Spuyten Duyvil derailment, occurred in the cut near the site of the 1882 wreck
- December 2013 Spuyten Duyvil derailment, occurred a mile away just north of Spuyten Duyvil station, killing four
