= Spuyten Duyvil =

Spuyten Duyvil may refer to:

- Spuyten Duyvil Creek, a channel connecting the Hudson River to the Harlem River Ship Canal, and on to the Harlem River in New York City
  - Spuyten Duyvil, Bronx, a neighborhood just north of the Creek
  - Spuyten Duyvil station, a commuter railroad station that serves the residents of the Spuyten Duyvil neighborhood of the Bronx, New York via the Hudson Line
  - Spuyten Duyvil Bridge, a swing bridge that carries Amtrak's Empire Corridor line across the Spuyten Duyvil Creek between Manhattan and the Bronx, in New York City
  - December 2013 Spuyten Duyvil derailment, a commuter train accident which occurred near Spuyten Duyvil station
  - Spuyten Duyvil and Port Morris Railroad, a precursor railway to the New York Central Railroad
  - USS Spuyten Duyvil, a torpedo boat built in 1864 for service toward the end of the American Civil War
- Spuyten Duyvil (train), a New York Central corridor train
