= July 2013 Spuyten Duyvil derailment =

Freight-train accident in the Bronx on commuter rail line

Spuyten Duyvil derailment (July 2013)
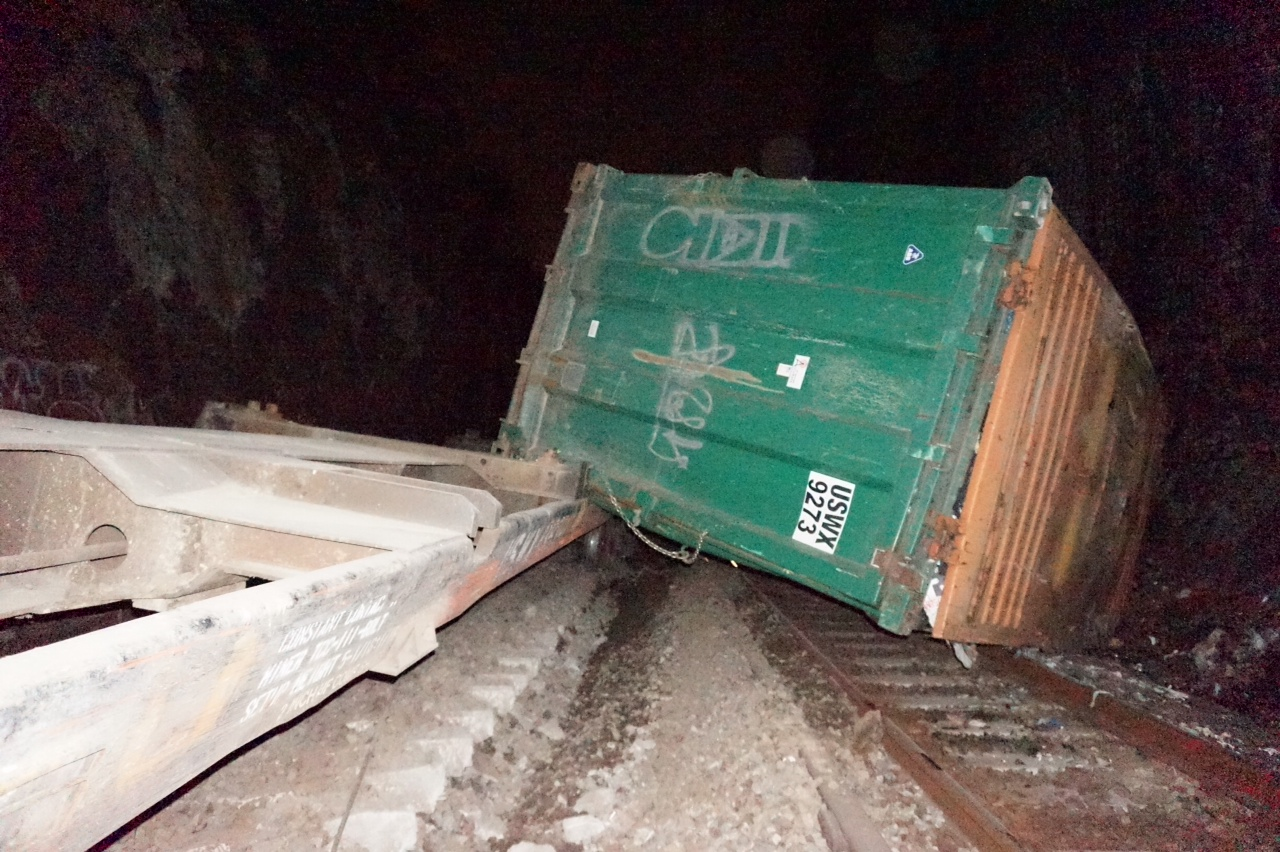
- A waste container spilled on the tracks shortly after the accident

Details
- Date: July 18, 2013; 13 years ago 8:29 p.m. EDT (12:19 UTC)
- Location: Between Spuyten Duyvil and Marble Hill stations, Bronx, NY
- Coordinates: 40.87590°N 73.91681°W
- Country: United States
- Line: Hudson Line
- Operator: CSX
- Incident type: Derailment
- Cause: Excessive track gauge

Statistics
- Trains: 1
- Crew: 4
- Deaths: 0
- Injured: 0
- Damage: US$827,000

On the evening of July 18, 2013, a CSX freight train carrying municipal solid waste on tracks of the Hudson Line along the Harlem River Ship Canal in the New York City borough of The Bronx partially derailed between the Marble Hill and Spuyten Duyvil stations. While no one was injured, the derailment caused over US$800,000 in damage and took several days to clean up. Commuter rail service by Metro-North Railroad, which owns the line, was suspended for two weekends in order to fully restore normal operations.

After investigating the accident, the National Transportation Safety Board (NTSB) found it had been caused by the track stretching to an excessive gauge at the point of derailment. It did not fault the crew, instead criticizing Metro-North for failing to maintain the track and surrounding ballast to the point that the track went out of gauge. Later in the year, in a comprehensive safety review after another derailment of a passenger train nearby resulted in the first passenger fatalities in Metro-North's history, the NTSB cited the maintenance shortfall as part of an inadequate "safety culture" at the railroad.

== Background ==
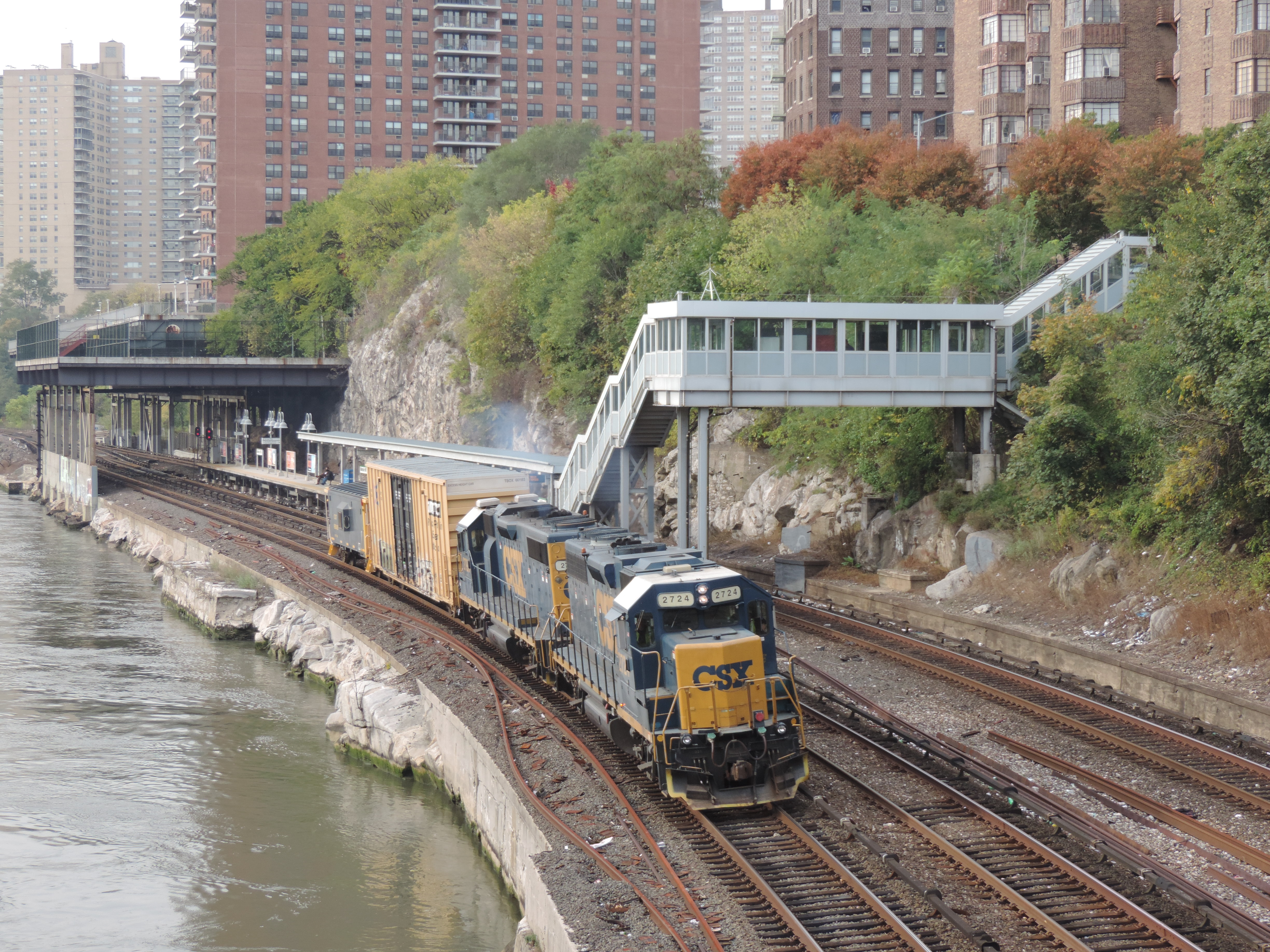
A different CSX freight using the bypass track at the Marble Hill station, shown in October 2014

The CSX train left Oak Point Yard near Hunts Point in the South Bronx at 6:30 p.m. that evening. The weather was clear and hot—temperatures were above 90 °F (32 °C), as they had been for the previous three days, enough for the National Weather Service to have issued a heat advisory for the city. A crew of four, an engineer and conductor plus a trainee for those positions, led a consist of two SD40-2 locomotives and 24 flatcars specially modified to carry four large containers of solid waste collected by New York's sanitation department to a landfill in Virginia.

From Oak Point the train went first south along the Northeast Corridor line also used by Amtrak, until it left to follow a spur west along the north side of the Bronx Kill and, after that, the Harlem River, where the track turned northwest to follow the river. At Highbridge Yard, the train followed the track as it merged onto those used by Metro-North Railroad's Hudson Line commuter rail service from Grand Central Station to points along the east bank of the Hudson River as far north as Poughkeepsie. It was one of four such waste trains that regularly use the Hudson Line's tracks each night; two northbound (Note: Most freight leaving New York City or Long Island for destinations to the south of the city must first go north up the east side of the Hudson to where it can cross over to Selkirk, NY, 140 miles (230 km) north of the city, and then begin its journey southwards.) with full containers and two southbound (Note: Likewise, freight traffic to the city from the south must also go up through Selkirk and then down the east side of the river.) returning the emptied ones.

There are generally two tracks along this stretch, both electrified with third rails for Metro-North's electric multiple unit trains serving the stations along the Hudson Line south of Croton-Harmon in Westchester County. (Note: The CSX trains, powered by diesel-fueled electromotor locomotives, do not use the third rails.) With a few exceptions, they are immediately adjacent to the river and almost completely level. They consist of ribbon rail laid in standard gauge on prestressed concrete ties supported by a bed of crushed trap rock ballast.

In Metro-North territory, the train passed the Morris Heights and University Heights stations, serving those areas of the Bronx. Just north of the latter, a third track diverged to allow trains to bypass the Marble Hill station, in a mainland section of Manhattan, where passenger trains stop more frequently, allowing a transfer to the nearby subway station. Metro-North rates the tracks in this area as Class 2 under Federal Railroad Administration (FRA) guidelines, allowing a passenger speed limit of 30 miles per hour (48 km/h) and a freight speed limit of 15 miles per hour (24 km/h) 10 mph below that allowed by the FRA.

== Accident ==
Almost two hours after leaving Oak Point, the CSX train reached the Marble Hill station, where the train was on the outside track closest to the river and away from the elevated platform. Metro-North train #781, an EMU consist making all local stops up to Croton-Harmon, was stopped at the station while the freight had priority. Ahead, at the control point marking exactly 10 miles (16 km) from Grand Central, was a red signal. The engineer later told NTSB investigators he used the dynamic brakes to slow the train down. It was almost stopped when it changed back to green, allowing the train to proceed.

The CSX engineer began accelerating his train again, preparing to merge on to one of the two main tracks. He was mindful also of a slight curve into a rock cut just past the control point. He followed his usual practice of taking the curve by notching the throttle up until the train had reached Metro-North's 15 mph speed limit, then taking it back down to idle so as to drift through the curve, then notching it up again slowly as it lost speed in the curve. (Note: According to the NTSB report, the train's event data recorder showed that the train had reached a speed of 19 miles per hour (31 km/h) going through the curve this way.)

As the CSX train rounded the curve, the engineer of the Metro-North train saw sparks and dust. He realized that some of the freight's cars had derailed, and immediately notified that train's engineer by radio. The CSX engineer applied the air brakes at full pressure, and soon the train's own emergency brakes took over. When the train came to a stop, the conductor departed the cab and made a visual inspection. Nine cars in the middle of the train had indeed derailed, some of them blocking the other track, along with containers that had fallen off their cars and spilled.

== Aftermath ==
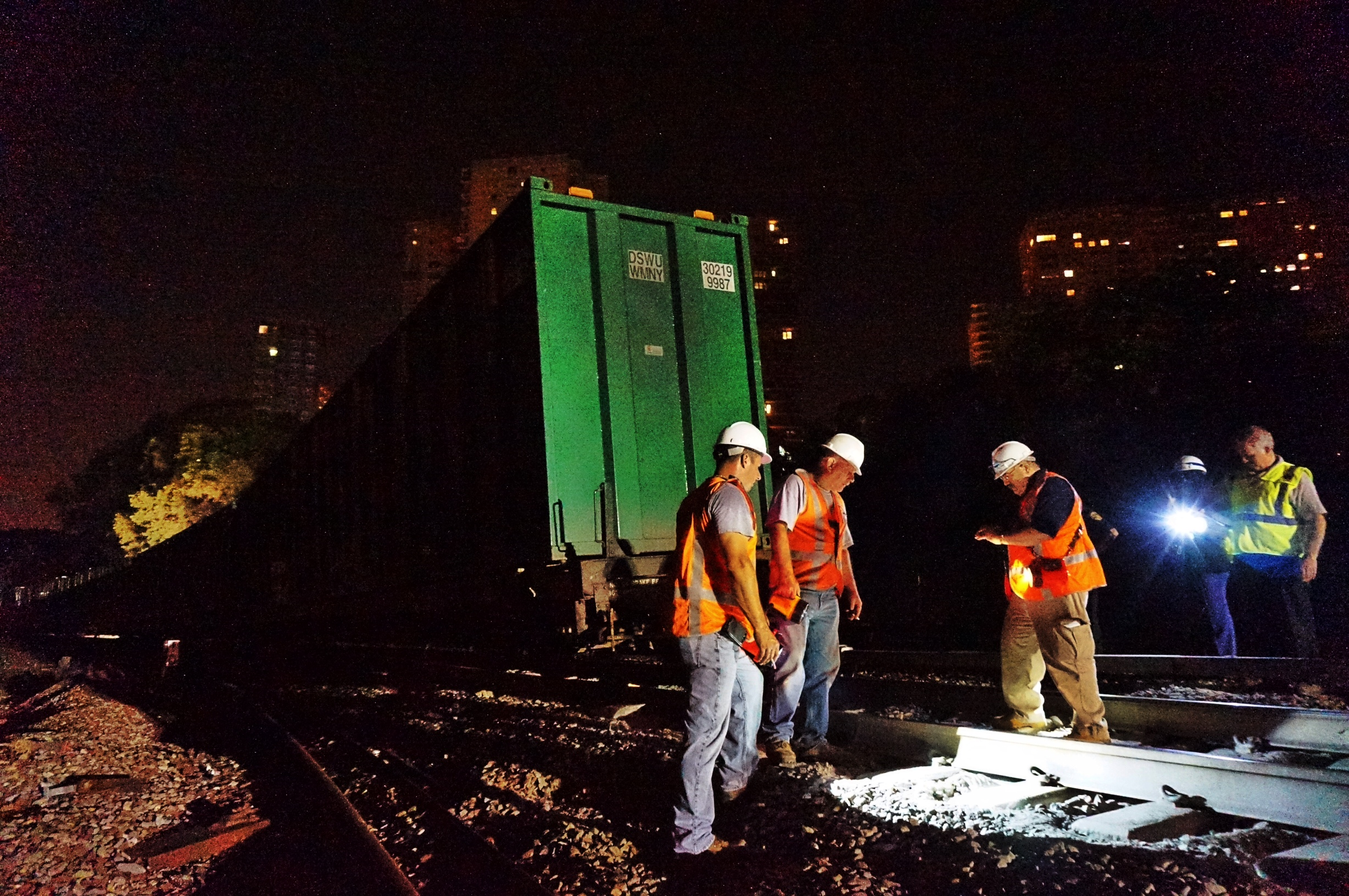
Workers inspecting the accident site shortly afterwards

As soon as the accident was reported to it, Metro-North suspended service in the affected area between Marble Hill and Spuyten Duyvil. Passengers on the #781 train, or already waiting at Marble Hill, were taken back to the Yankee Stadium station south of Highbridge Yard and discharged. Some complained they were offered neither an explanation or alternatives, although Metro-North began offering shuttle bus service between Marble Hill and Riverdale, the next station north of Spuyten Duyvil, by midnight. It also announced that Hudson Line tickets would be cross-honored on the Harlem Line, which parallels the New York–Connecticut state line through the same three counties.

Metro-North crews began working within hours to assess the damage. By morning rush hour, the railroad had suspended all service on the Hudson Line south of Yonkers, three stations north of the accident site, until cleanup and repairs could be completed. In the meantime, it arranged bus service from Yonkers to the Van Cortlandt Park – 242nd Street station, the northern terminus of the New York City Subway's 1 train, which many Hudson Line passengers disembark to at the Marble Hill station to reach jobs on the West Side of Manhattan. Howard Permut, president of Metro-North, promised riders that normal service would resume by July 22, the next Monday, four days after the accident.

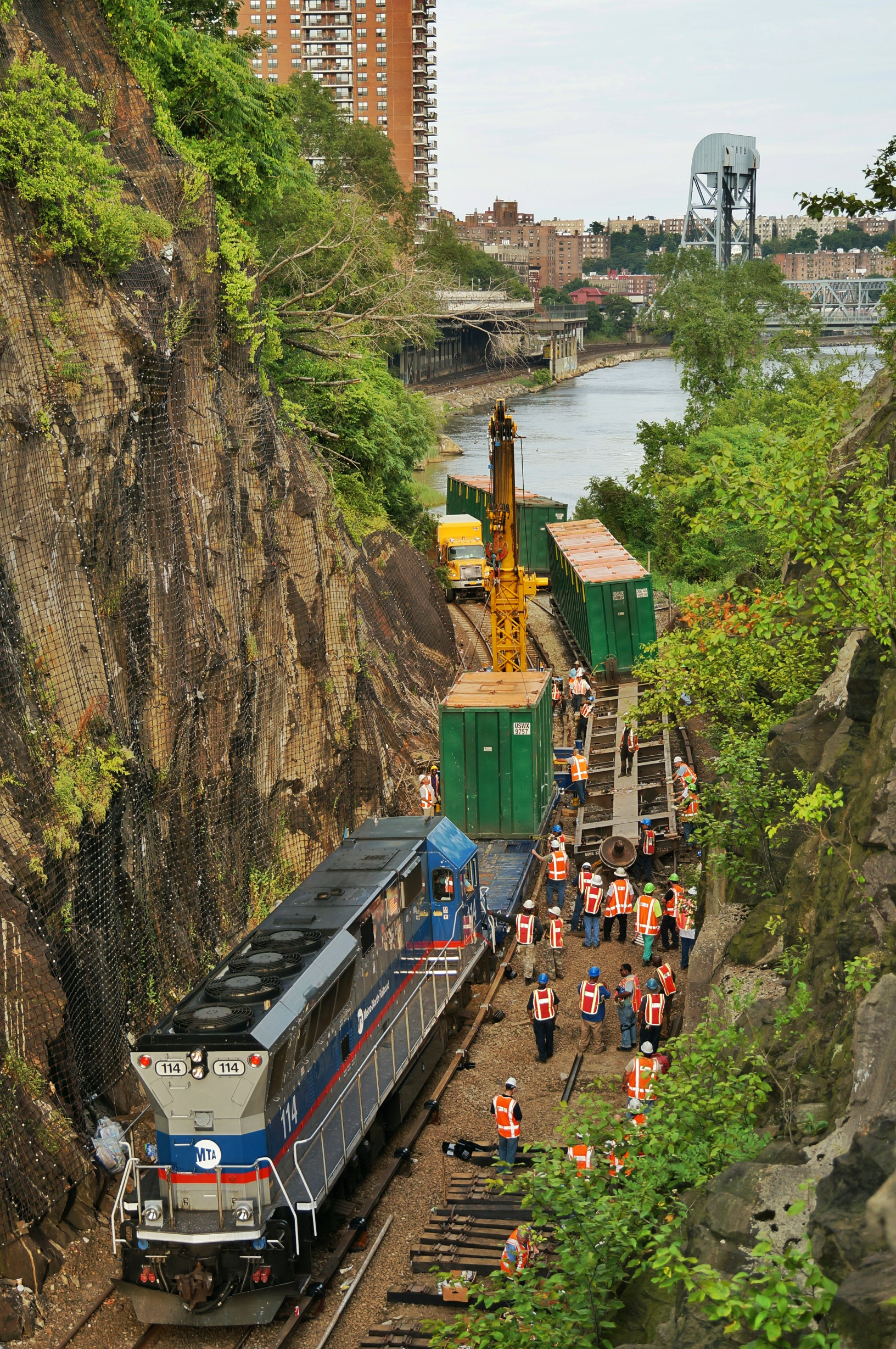
The narrow rock cut where the derailment occurred complicated cleanup efforts

The next morning, a Friday, posed a challenge for regular Hudson Line commuters. Some riders, particularly those who normally took trains to Grand Central, more convenient to the East Side and Brooklyn, chose to drive in instead or take the day off, giving themselves an unanticipated three-day weekend. Those that took the train anyway were mostly late for work, since the detours added as much as an hour and a half to their commutes. A Poughkeepsie woman interning on Wall Street told The New York Times she did not bother calling her superiors to explain why she was late, since "[t]hey take the train too." Metro-North estimated that Hudson Line ridership was half of what it otherwise might have been that day.

Throughout the day and following weekend cleanup continued. That task was complicated by the location of most of the derailed cars in a short, narrow rock cut. Cranes and other heavy equipment used to lift cars back onto the tracks, and the spilled containers back on them, had to be laboriously repositioned after each use due to the limited space available, adding hours to the job. Some of the flatcar trucks were badly damaged in the accident and had to be repaired in situ to make them usable again. Workers also had to contend with the continued hot and humid weather. Some containers had also opened in the accident, spilling their contents, which had to be repacked. "It's not like pickup sticks", explained a Metro-North spokeswoman.

Crews from Metro-North, assisted by subway workers, worked around the clock through the weekend. After clearing the wrecked flatcars and reloading the containers, they had to repair a 1,500-foot (460 m) stretch of track. By Monday morning Metro-North was able to keep Permut's promise and reopen one of the two main tracks affected. It was able to handle 40 inbound and 12 outbound trains, mostly during the morning and evening rush hours.

Work continued throughout the week on the other track. It was necessary to suspend service again over the next weekend, starting on Saturday morning to avoid disrupting service for fans headed to a New York Yankees home baseball game on the night of July 26, a Friday. By the evening of Monday, July 29, the tracks had been completely cleared and fully repaired. Service on both tracks was restored to normal.

== Investigation ==
The Metro-North workers were joined at the site by investigators from the NTSB, there to determine the cause of the accident. They retrieved electronic devices like the cab video cameras and event data recorder. After examining the damaged infrastructure closely, they took samples back to Highbridge for testing. Later they interviewed the crew of the CSX train, the Metro-North engineer who had witnessed the derailment and notified the CSX crew, and Metro-North employees responsible for maintenance of way.

They found a wheel flange mark on the inside of the western rail at a point almost 73 feet (22 m) north of the control point where the CSX train had slowed almost to a stop when it saw the red. This they identified as the point of derailment (POD). They noticed immediately that the insulators on the Pandrol clips holding the rails to the concrete ties had slipped out of place slightly, with a noticeable gap between them and the rails in some areas. At the POD the rail was bowed slightly outward, resulting in a 5/16-inch (7.9 mm) variance from gauge.

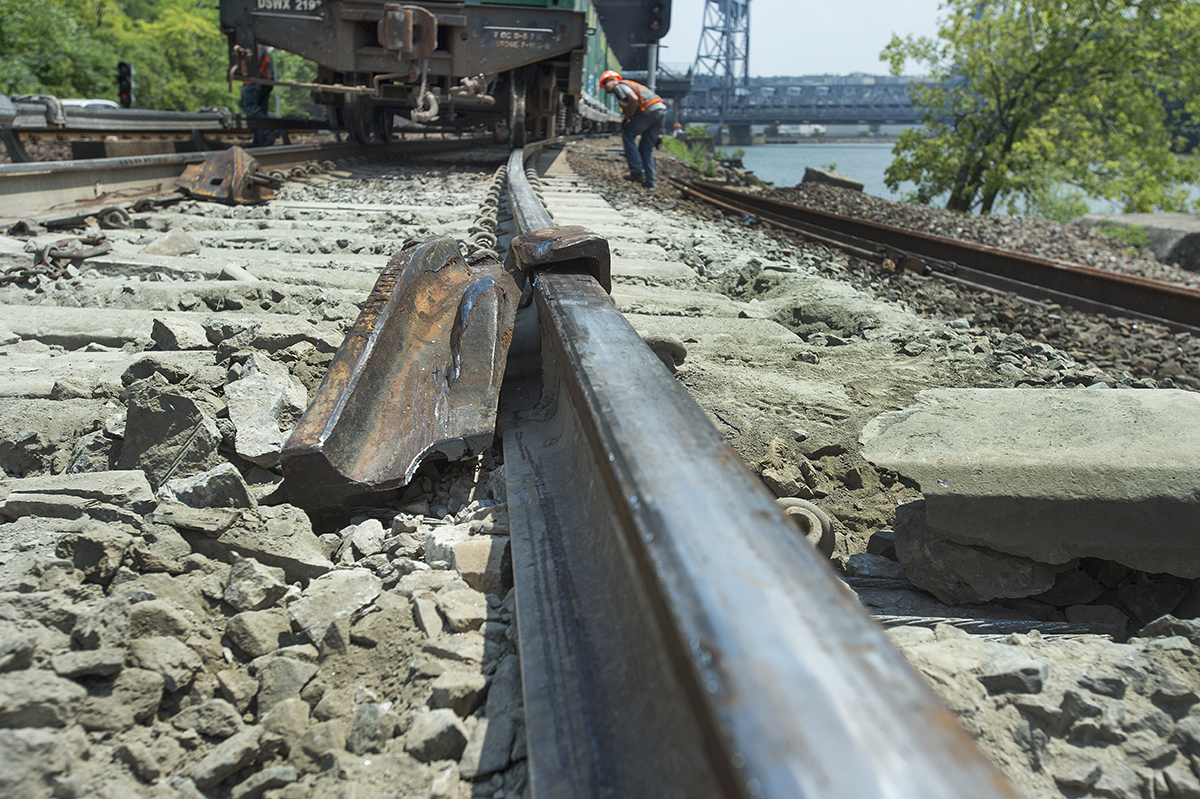
Rail damage in an area where soil infiltration was evident

At and near the POD the ballast and track were notably paler. This was because they were covered with dust, indicating that soil infiltration had occurred. The pale dust was not the soil itself, but residue from the tie ends, which had suffered serious abrasion. Wheel flange grooves were also evident in some of the ties taken back to Highbridge, suggesting the track had been bending outward under load due to decreased structural support from the fouled ballast. This evidence was noted in 2010 satellite photos of the area on Google Earth and more recent photos taken by Metro-North itself.

After making these measurements, they compared them with data from recent FRA and Metro-North track inspections. In early June, the agency had gone through the area with its track geometry car. At the POD it had recorded a 2-inch (51 mm) dip in the same track, consistent with motion noted on the cab video cameras in both CSX locomotives, and recorded the gauge as 0.06 inches (1.5 mm) over the regulatory standard of 57 3/4 inches (1,470 mm) for Class 2 track. Both values were within tolerance.

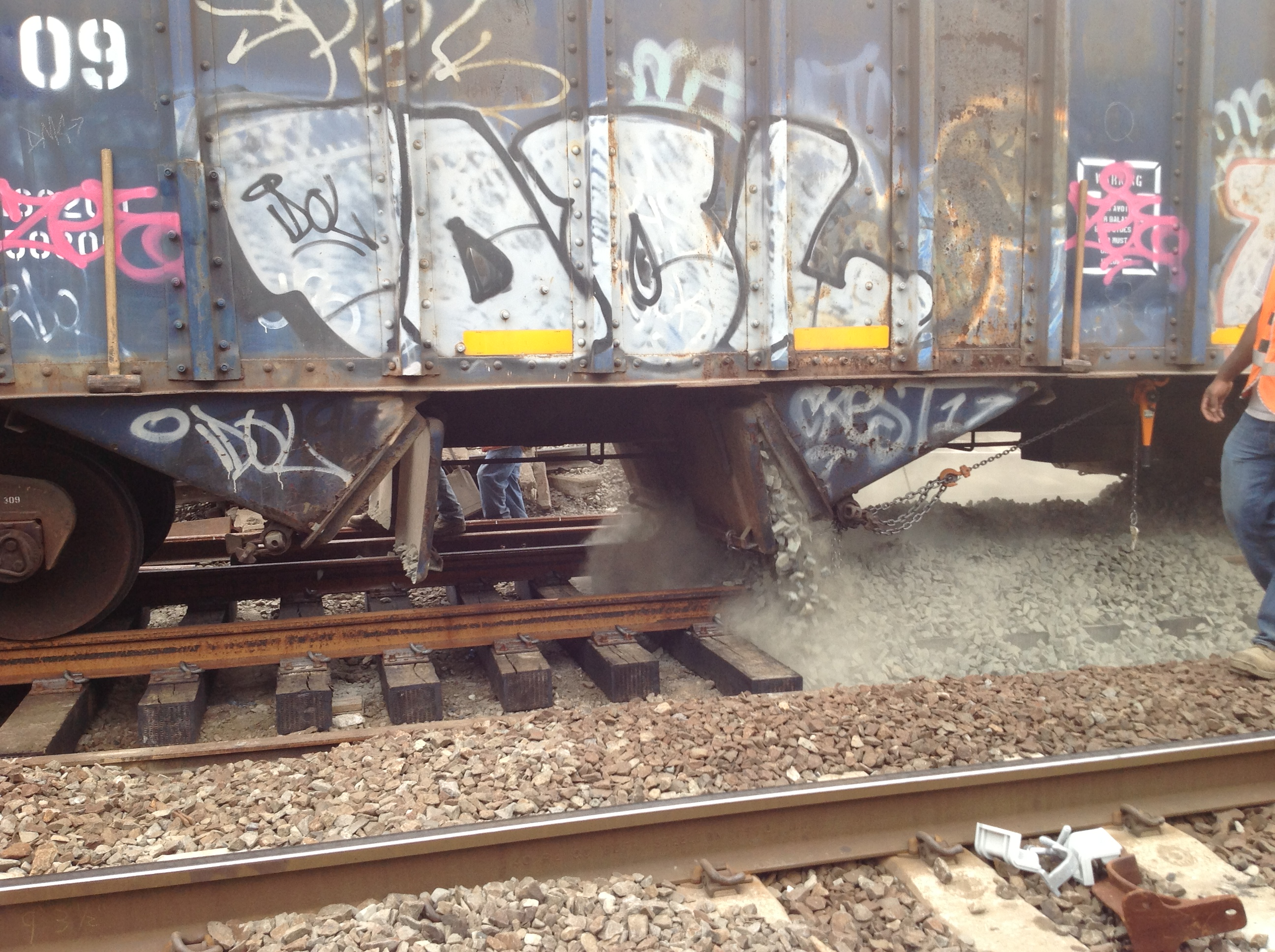
Metro-North laying new ballast after the accident

The day before the accident, Metro-North had conducted a visual inspection of the track in the area on foot. The railroad's inspectors noted no reportable defects at or near the POD. However, within a mile (1.6 km) to the north of the accident, there were others, including broken ties and poorly drained areas.

Upon review of Metro-North's maintenance records, the investigators learned that the track and concrete ties had been installed in 2000. The railroad's plans indicated that the track was to be resurfaced (i.e., the ballast replaced) every three years, and the ties and rails replaced every seven. However, since a 2004 resurfacing, neither action had been taken. Metro-North's chief engineer admitted the railroad was behind. He could not explain why, but he said Metro-North was "working towards getting back into phase."

More recently, the NTSB noted, following a derailment of a passenger train in Connecticut two months earlier, which had also resulted from a defective and inadequately maintained rail, the railroad had hired Transportation Technology Center, Inc. (TTCI), to evaluate its track maintenance program. Among the tasks undertaken by TTCI was to survey the entire Metro-North system for areas exhibiting surfacing issues like fouled ballast and poor drainage. One of the 654 such areas it found was the POD.

=== Conclusion ===
The NTSB did not issue its report until October 2014, due to delays caused by its investigation of a derailment of a Metro-North passenger train near the same site in December 2013, which caused the first passenger fatalities in Metro-North's history. In the report, the NTSB found the accident had not been caused by any of the CSX crew's actions, nor those of Metro-North's dispatchers. There were no mechanical problems with the train, and the waste containers had been loaded properly and were within their permitted weights. The signal system was also working properly.

Instead, it found the proximate cause of the accident to be the excessive track gauge at the POD. It, in turn, resulted from the soil infiltration of the underlying ballast, which had itself been the result of inadequate drainage. As trains passed over that section of track, the stored water was pumped within the ballast, compromising the track's ability to support the train. Eventually the ties began to crack in the center and abrade at the ends, and the rails themselves begin to cant outwards, gradually exceeding permitted gauge limits, as the track had in this case. Ultimately, the fault was Metro-North's for failing to follow its own maintenance schedule, the NTSB said.

Four days later, the NTSB issued a press release noting that Metro-North had experienced five major accidents, resulting in four passenger and two worker fatalities (the first in its history), in the space of 10 months. Its investigations had identified "several safety management problems that were common to all of the accidents", among them "inadequate and ineffective track inspection and maintenance [and] extensive deferred maintenance issues" such as those that had contributed to the CSX derailment. All were "deficiencies in ... organizational safety culture", the agency said, that could make a huge difference if corrected.

== See also ==
- List of rail accidents (2010–2019)
- 1882 Spuyten Duyvil train wreck, crash that killed eight on now-removed section of track just east of the rock cut where the derailment happened.
