= 2013 Spuyten Duyvil derailment =

There were two train derailments in the Bronx neighborhood of Spuyten Duyvil during 2013:

- July 2013 Spuyten Duyvil derailment: A northbound CSX freight train partially derailed along Metro-North's Hudson Line between the Marble Hill and Spuyten Duyvil stations due to the track deforming as a result of deferred maintenance.
- December 2013 Spuyten Duyvil derailment: A southbound Metro-North passenger train went off the tracks just north of the Spuyten Duyvil station when the engineer lost attention and went into a curve at high speed, resulting in the first four passenger deaths in the railroad's history.
