= North Riverdale, Bronx =

Neighborhood in New York City

Coordinates: 40°54′32.07″N 73°54′13.47″W

North Riverdale is the northernmost part of the Riverdale neighborhood of the borough of the Bronx in New York City, particularly above 254th Street. It is a residential sub-neighborhood, and shares its northern border with Yonkers, New York in Westchester County.

The northernmost point in New York City is at the Hudson River on the campus of the College of Mount Saint Vincent.

== Description ==
One of the geographic characteristics which gives all of Riverdale its suburban quality is that it lies on a high ridge which separates it from the rest of the city. The highest part of the ridge, at 284.5 feet (87 m) above sea level, lies in North Riverdale, near Iselin Avenue and 250th Street. North Riverdale has been described as "leafy" and "sleepy" and, by one resident, "the last bastion of gracious living in New York City." The neighborhood is generally wealthy and mostly free of serious crime with the exception of grand theft auto. It features a mixture of private residences and apartment buildings.

Traditionally a bastion of Irish Catholics, since 2003 and the building of the Salanter Akiba Academy (SAR) High School the neighborhood has seen an influx of Orthodox Jewish families. While Riverdale as a whole has long had a sizable Orthodox Jewish population – and overall is predominantly Jewish – North Riverdale has not.

In 1998, residents of North Riverdale joined citizens of Yonkers in protesting the building of the Riverdale Classic Residence, a 17-story retirement home which would be located on Riverdale Avenue. Although the building would be sited in Yonkers, because it would sit on the top of a hill, North Riverdale residents feared that it would tower over the smaller apartment buildings and single family residences there. Despite the protests, the building, which did not require a hearing to be approved, was built at its intended height.

== Notable places ==
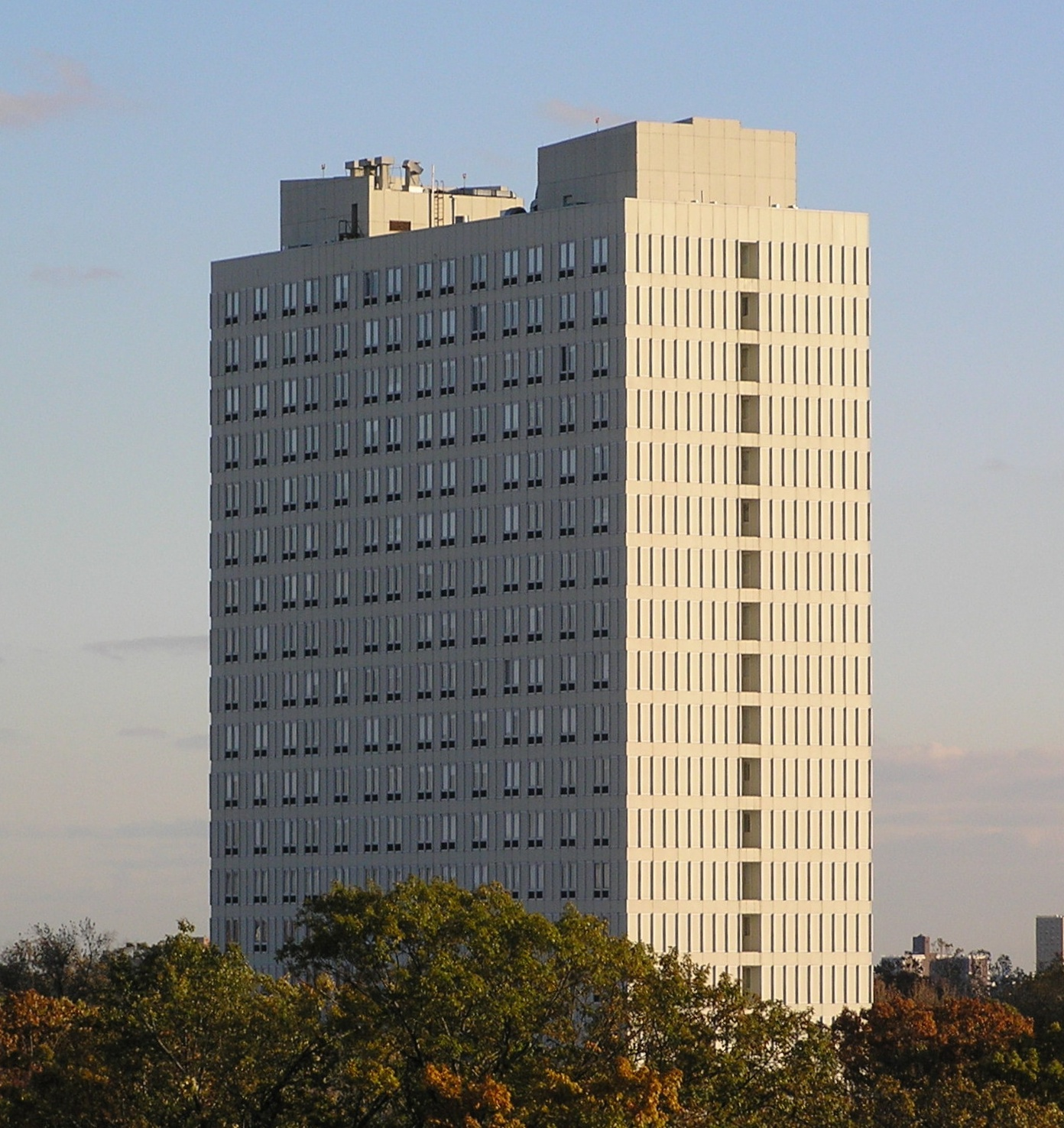
The Russian Mission

Points of interest in the neighborhood include the Hillside Residential Enclave on Ladd Road and the James Strain House, both listed by the AIA Guide to New York City; the Monastery of the Visitation on Arlington Avenue at West 256th Street; the Riverdale Yacht Club on the Hudson River at West 254th Street, built c.1880; the Passionist Fathers and Brothers Monastery on Palisades Avenue; the Riverdale Neighborhood House, founded in 1920 and located at 5221 Mosholu Avenue; the Russian Mission School in New York and former Diplomatic Residence of the United Nations Mission of the U.S.S.R, a 19-story apartment building designed by Skidmore, Owings & Merrill and built in 1975; and the Riverdale Branch of the New York Public Library on Mosholu Avenue at West 256th Street; Just south of 254th Street, along Sycamore Avenue, lies the 15-acre Riverdale Historic District, which consists primarily of estates on landscaped sites.

P.S. 81 serves elementary school children in North Riverdale, and the neighborhood is home to the College of Mount Saint Vincent.

Places of worship in North Riverdale include St. Margaret of Cortona's Church Roman Catholic, Congregation Shaarei Shalom and Young Israel Ohab Zedek of North Riverdale.

The Mt. St. Vincent New York Central Railroad station on the Metro North Hudson Line, which was closed, and abandoned on June 3, 1975, was located on West 261st Street in North Riverdale.

== Transportation ==
The neighborhood is served by the Bx7 and Bx10 MTA Regional Bus Operations local buses on Riverdale Avenue, as well as the Bx9 on Broadway. The BxM1, BxM2, and BxM18 express buses serve Riverdale Avenue, and the BxM3 serves Broadway. In addition, the 1, 2, 1X, and 3 buses from Bee-Line of Westchester County pass by the neighborhood on their way to the 242nd Street Subway Station.

Metro-North Railroad serves the neighborhood at Riverdale station. The Hudson Rail Link A, B, C, and D routes serve the neighborhood, connecting to the Metro-North station.

== See also ==
- Irish Americans in New York City
- Woodlawn, Bronx
