= Hudson Rail Link =

Bus system in the Bronx, New York

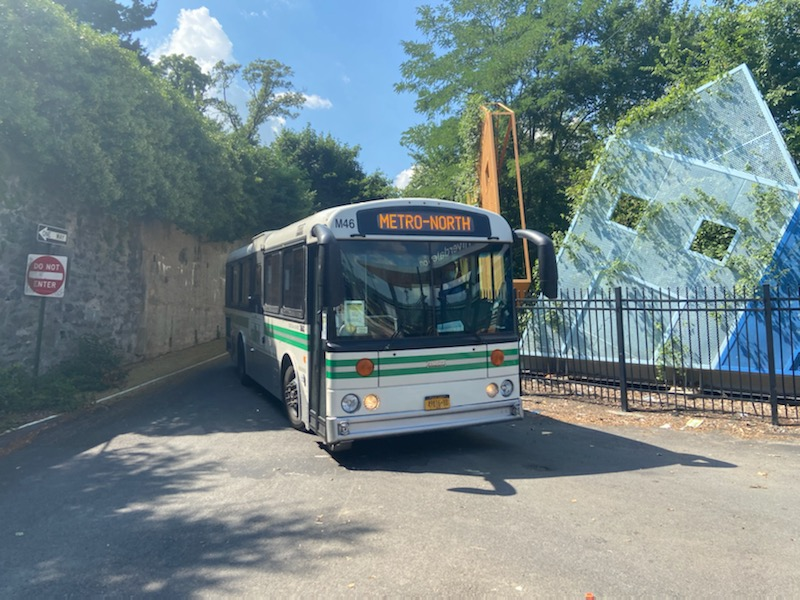
- Hudson Rail Link #M0046, on Route C, preparing to leave Riverdale station (2020).
- Founded: 1991
- Locale: Spuyten Duyvil and Riverdale
- Service area: The Bronx
- Service type: Shuttle bus
- Routes: 8
- Destinations: North Riverdale, Riverdale, Spuyten Duyvil
- Hubs: Riverdale station (Routes A, B, C, D); Spuyten Duyvil station (Routes J, K, L, M)
- Daily ridership: 1,500
- Annual ridership: 204,608 (annual ridership, 2024)
- Fuel type: Diesel (See Fleet for more.)
- Operator: Arrow Rail Link Service (Consolidated Bus Transit); Formerly Atlantic Express
- Website: Official website

The Hudson Rail Link is a feeder bus system, operated by Arrow Rail Link Service (Consolidated Bus Transit) for Metro-North Railroad, in the northwest Bronx in New York City. It connects the Riverdale and Spuyten Duyvil stations on the Hudson Line to the neighborhoods of the same name. Service began in 1991, and route M began in 2002. As of 2014, more than half of the daily commuters who use Spuyten Duyvil station arrive using the feeder bus. Service operates on weekdays only, connecting to and from Metro-North trains. It accepts MetroCard and OMNY, and UniTickets are available at a discount for rail passengers.

== Routes ==
Route	Terminals		Primary streets traveled	Notes
A	West 263rd Street and Riverdale Avenue	Riverdale station	254th Street, Riverdale Avenue	Peak only
B	West 259th Street and Arlington Avenue	Riverdale station	254th Street, Riverdale Avenue	Peak only
C	Mosholu Avenue and Fieldston Road	Riverdale station	254th Street, Riverdale Avenue, Broadway	Off-peak only, combination of routes A, B, and D Only Riverdale route to operate during the COVID-19 pandemic
D	West 262nd Street and Broadway	Riverdale station	Broadway, Mosholu Avenue	Peak only
J	West 239th Street and Independence Avenue	Spuyten Duyvil station	Henry Hudson Parkway	Peak only
K	West 246th Street, Henry Hudson Parkway	Spuyten Duyvil station	Henry Hudson Parkway	Peak only
L	West 231st Street and Riverdale Avenue	Spuyten Duyvil station	Henry Hudson Parkway, Riverdale Avenue, Johnson Avenue	Off-peak only, combination of routes J, K, and M Only Spuyten Duyvil route to operate during the COVID-19 pandemic
M	West 227th Street and Henry Hudson Parkway	Spuyten Duyvil station	Henry Hudson Parkway, Riverdale Avenue, Johnson Avenue	Peak only

== Fleet ==
=== Active fleet ===
Fleet numbers	Photo	Year	Manufacturer	Model
M0028-M0050		2009-2024	Thomas Built Buses	Saf-T-Liner HDX RE 25'

=== Retired fleet ===
This list is incomplete

Fleet numbers	Photo	Year	Manufacturer	Model
M0018-M0027		2003	Blue Bird	All American FE
