= Riverdale station (Metro-North) =

Metro-North Railroad station in the Bronx, New York

Riverdale
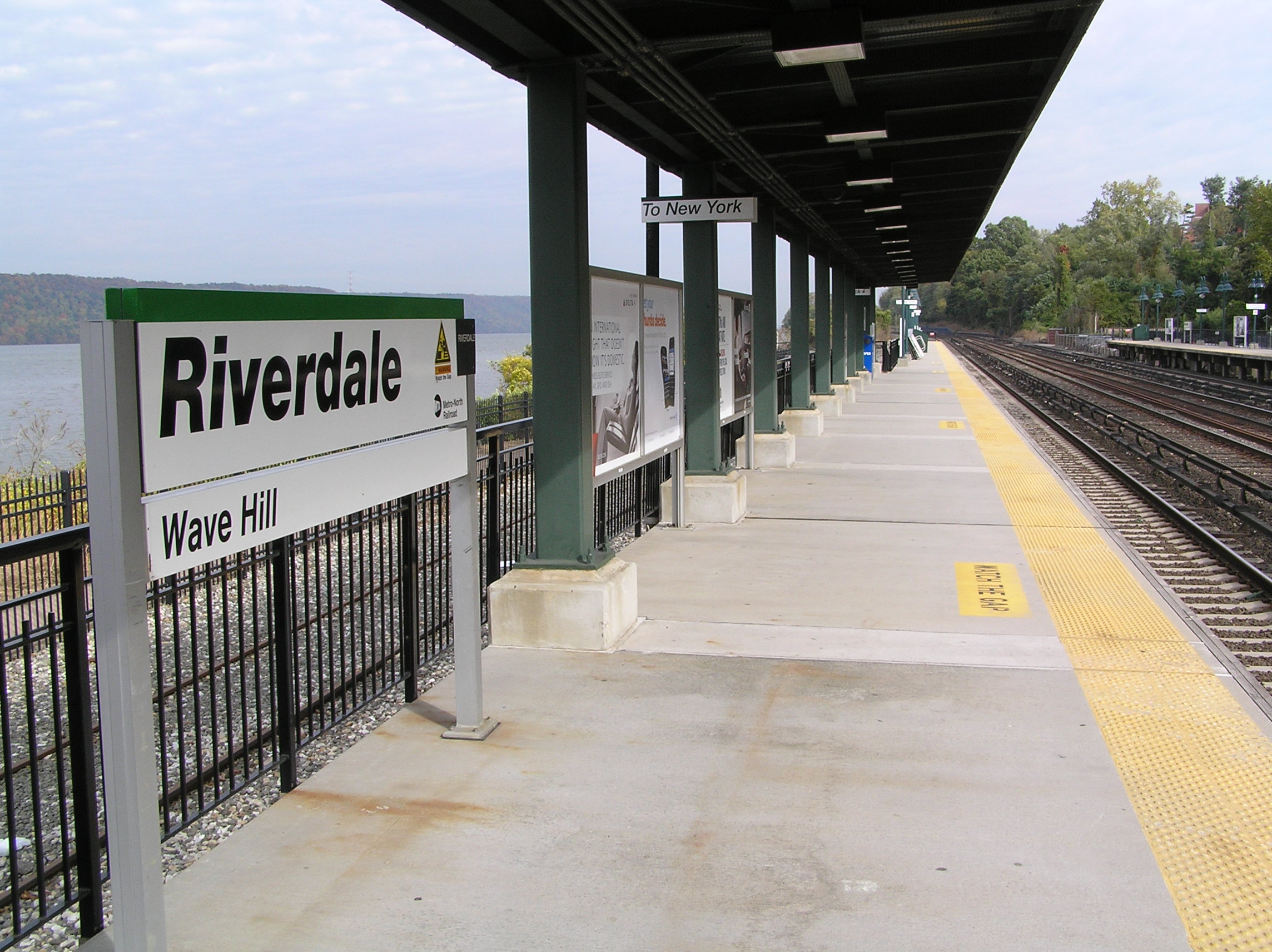
- The Riverdale Metro-North station

General information
- Location: Railroad Terrace and West 254th Street; Riverdale, Bronx, New York
- Coordinates: 40.90444°N 73.9139°W
- Owner: Metro-North Railroad
- Line: Hudson Line (Metro-North)
- Platforms: 2 side platforms
- Tracks: 5
- Connections: Hudson Rail Link: A, B, C, D

Construction
- Parking: 153 spaces
- Accessible: yes

Other information
- Fare zone: 2

Key dates
- June 23, 1982: Station depot burned

Passengers
- 2018: 692 (Metro-North)
- Rank: 66 of 109

Services
Preceding station	Metro-North Railroad	Following station
Ludlow toward Croton–Harmon	Hudson Line	Spuyten Duyvil toward Grand Central

Former services
Preceding station	New York Central Railroad	Following station
Mt. St. Vincent toward Peekskill	Hudson Division	Spuyten Duyvil toward New York
Location

Riverdale station (also known as Riverdale–West 254th Street station) is a commuter rail stop on the Metro-North Railroad's Hudson Line, serving the Riverdale neighborhood of the Bronx, New York City. The Riverdale station, located at the foot of West 254th Street, is the northernmost Metro-North station in New York City on the Hudson Line. As of August 2006, daily commuter ridership was 543 and there were 153 parking spaces.

== History ==
The former New York Central Railroad depot at the location burned down on the morning of June 23, 1982, after a suspicious fire, requiring two trains to bypass the station.

In 1991 the Hudson Rail Link opened as a feeder bus service operated by Atlantic Express to connect the Riverdale neighborhood to the Metro-North station. The Hudson Rail Link is now operated by Consolidated Bus Transit after Atlantic Express declared bankruptcy in 2014.

The Riverdale Waterfront Promenade was inaugurated in 2005 by mayor Michael Bloomberg, created to improve riverside access to local residents. Access to the park is only through the station.

Under the 2015–2019 Metropolitan Transportation Authority Capital Plan, the station, along with four other Metro-North Railroad stations, received a complete overhaul as part of the Enhanced Station Initiative. Updates included cellular service, Wi-Fi, USB charging stations, interactive service advisories, and maps. The renovations at Riverdale station cost $9.5 million and were completed by the end of September 2018.

== Station layout ==
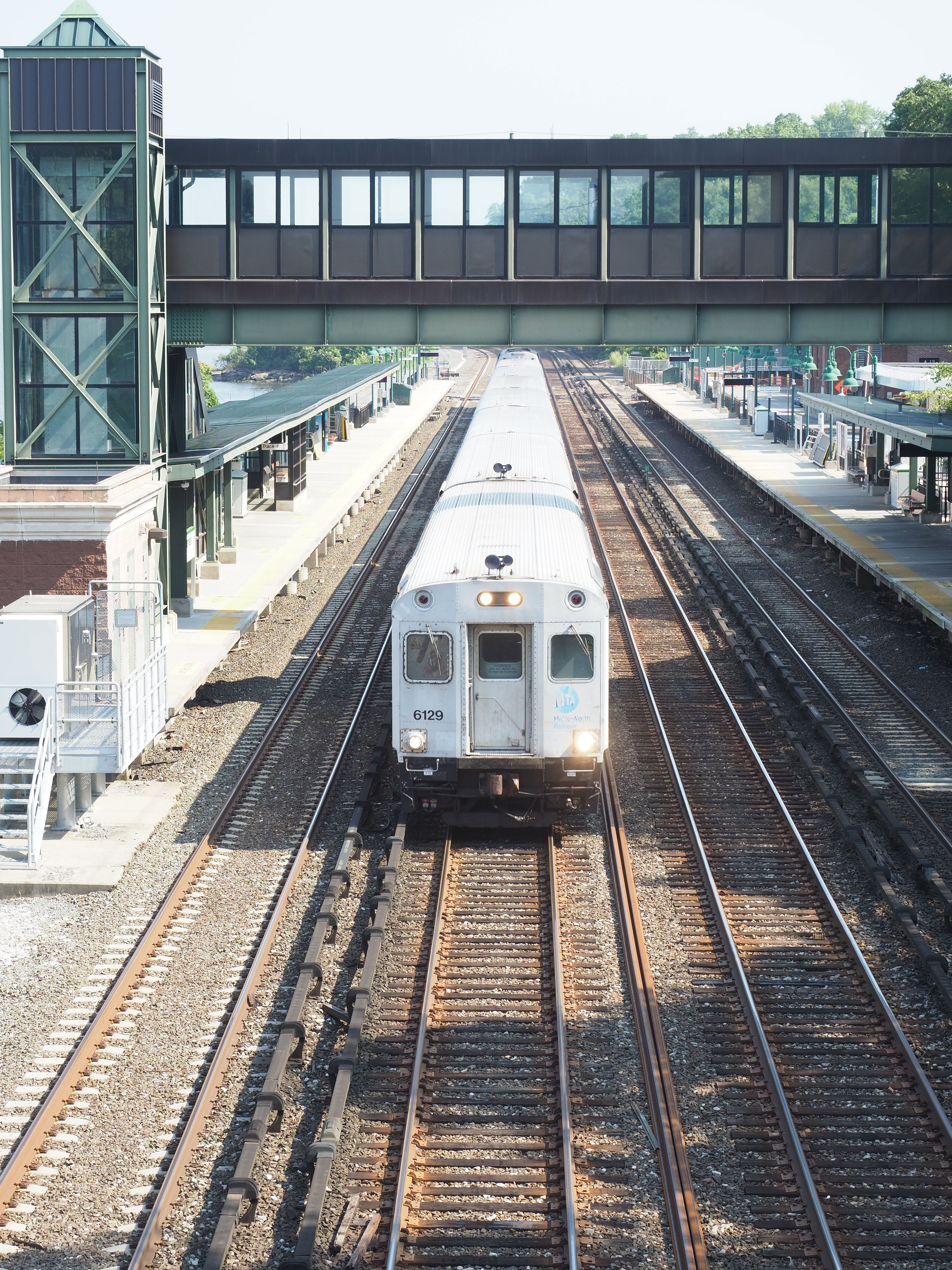
Southbound Metro North train passing through Riverdale station. Looking north from 254th street bridge.

The station has two high-level, side platforms, each eight cars long. There are two middle tracks without platform access. An additional fifth track (called track 6) is located west of the southbound platform, but is not powered nor used. Just south of the station are switches that allow Empire Corridor trains to diverge to Pennsylvania Station via the Empire Connection and Spuyten Duyvil Bridge.

Next to the station's southbound platform lies the Riverdale Waterfront Promenade and Fishing Access Site. The park is 20 feet (6.1 m) wide and 600 feet (180 m) long."
