= Marble Hill station =

Metro-North Railroad station in Manhattan, New York

Marble Hill
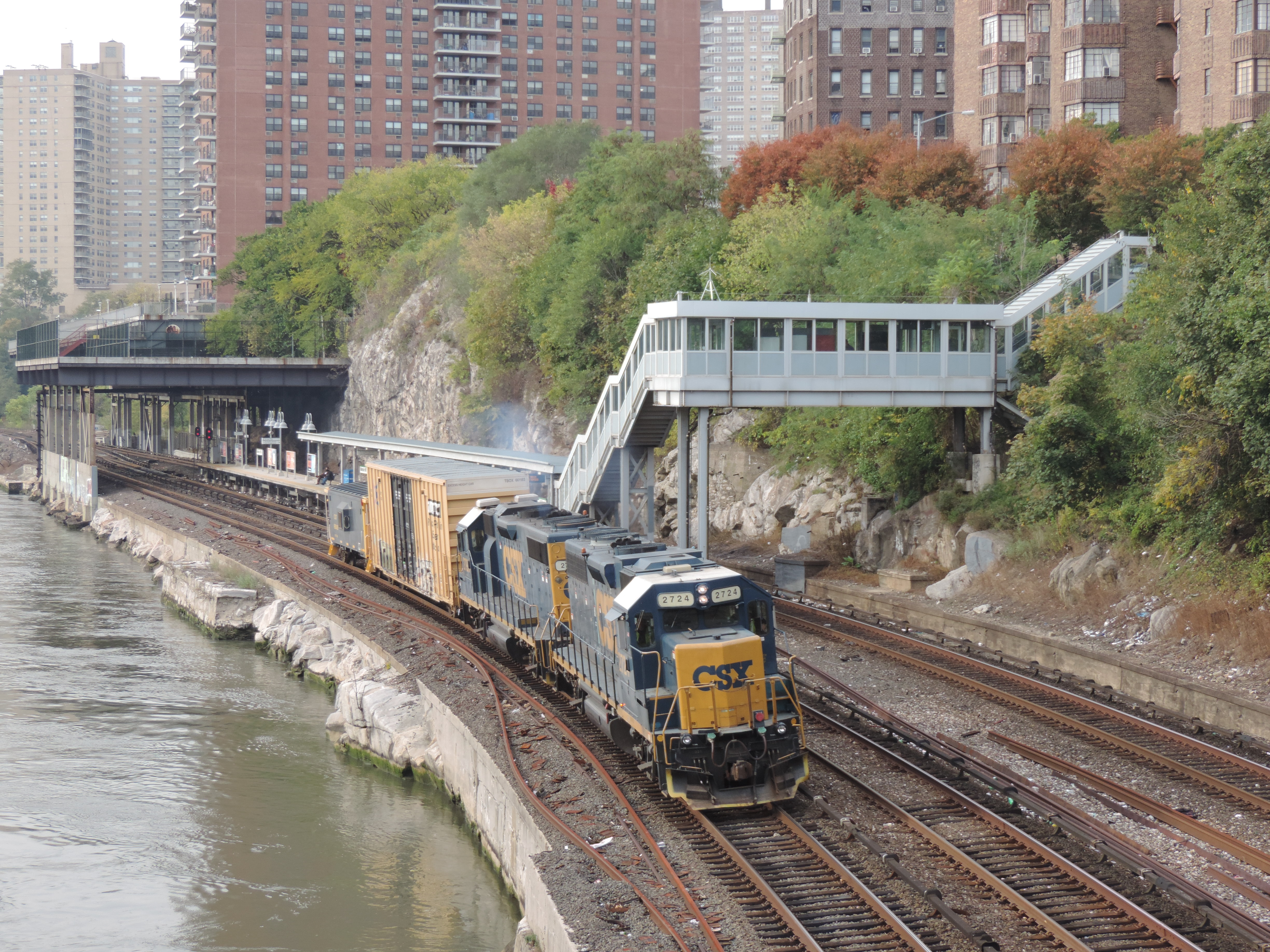
- Freight locomotives pass through the station. October 2014.

General information
- Location: 125 West 225th Street, Marble Hill, Manhattan, New York
- Coordinates: 40.8747°N 73.9120°W
- Owner: Metro-North Railroad
- Line: Hudson Line
- Platforms: 1 island platform
- Tracks: 3
- Connections: New York City Subway: at Marble Hill–225th Street; New York City Bus: Bx7, Bx9, Bx20; MTA Bus: BxM1

Construction
- Accessible: No

Other information
- Fare zone: 2

History
- Opened: 1906
- Rebuilt: 2005
- Electrified: 700V (DC) third rail

Key dates
- April 22, 1951: Station depot burned

Passengers
- 2018: 1,382 (Metro-North)
- Rank: 45 of 109

Services
Preceding station	Metro-North Railroad	Following station
Spuyten Duyvil toward Croton–Harmon	Hudson Line	University Heights toward Grand Central

Former services
Preceding station	New York Central Railroad	Following station
Spuyten Duyvil toward Peekskill	Hudson Division	Fordham Heights toward New York
Location

Marble Hill station is a commuter rail stop on the Metro-North Railroad's Hudson Line, serving the Marble Hill neighborhood of Manhattan in New York City. The station is located at 125 West 225th Street, two blocks west of the Broadway Bridge on the north side of the Harlem River, near the New York City Subway's Marble Hill–225th Street station (which serves the 1 train).

The Marble Hill station is frequently used by commuters going to and from the Manhattan neighborhoods of the Upper West Side, Washington Heights, Hudson Heights and Inwood; about a third of the station's daily ridership disembarks at Marble Hill to transfer to the subway.

Marble Hill used to be one of four express stations on the Hudson Line south of Croton–Harmon; most trains stopped there, except for peak-hour trains to and from Poughkeepsie. However, as of November 9, 2014, the only express trains that stop there are a few reverse peak trains in the morning, though most trains originating in or terminating at Croton do stop at the station.

== History ==
Prior to the construction of the Harlem River Ship Canal, the Hudson Line went around Marble Hill, and the nearest station was a station in the Bronx named Kingsbridge, which was also the name of a nearby station on the New York and Putnam Railroad. Between 1905 and 1906 the New York Central and Hudson River Railroad realigned the tracks along the north coast of the canal and built Marble Hill station on the east side of the Broadway Bridge. As with the rest of the stations along the Hudson Line, the station became a Penn Central station upon the merger between NYC and Pennsylvania Railroad in 1968. Penn Central continued commuter travel until it was taken over by Conrail in 1976, which at some point, moved the station to the west side of the bridge before the station and commuter line was taken over by Metro-North Railroad in 1983.

== Station layout ==
The station has one narrow, 4-car-long high-level island platform accessible by enclosed stairway from West 225th Street.

Until the late 1970s the station lay east of the Broadway Bridge with two low-level side platforms serving a four-track line, providing a more direct connection to the bridge sidewalk via a short flight of steps. However, the current location west of Broadway is closer to the residential section of Marble Hill and the downtown platform of the subway. The former northbound express track was removed.
