= 1882 in rail transport =

This article lists events related to rail transport that occurred in 1882.

== Events ==
=== January events ===
- January 1 – Opening to traffic of the Gotthard Tunnel (15 km (9.3 mi)), completing the Gotthardbahn in Switzerland.
- January 2 – Building northward from San Diego, California Southern Railroad tracks reach Fallbrook, California.
- January 9 – The first train from Cincinnati, Ohio, on the Cincinnati Northern Railway, departs for Dayton, Ohio.
- January 12 – The first train between Cincinnati, Ohio, and Dayton, Ohio, delayed by poor trackwork on the Cincinnati Northern Railway, arrives in Dayton.

=== March events ===
- March 6 – Regular service begins on the Cincinnati Northern Railway between Cincinnati, Ohio, and Dayton, Ohio.
- March 27 – Continuing its northward construction, California Southern Railroad tracks reach Temecula, California.

=== April events ===
- April 17 – The St. Clairsville and Northern Railway, connecting St. Clairsville to Barton, Ohio, is incorporated.

=== May events ===
- May 15 – Lehrter Stadtbahnhof, the precursor to the current Berlin Hauptbahnhof, opens in Germany.

=== July events ===
- July 29 – Narrow gauge Catskill Mountain Railway opens to carry passengers from Hudson River steamboats to connections at Palenville, New York to the Catskill Mountain House destination resort.

=== August events ===
- August 21 – The first California Southern Railroad train from National City reaches Colton, California.
- August 23 – The first Canadian Pacific Railway train arrives in Regina, Saskatchewan, Canada.
- August 24 – The Lake Shore and Michigan Southern Railway leases the 97 mile (156 km) long Fort Wayne, Jackson and Saginaw Railroad.

=== September events ===
- September 1 – The Lake Shore and Michigan Southern Railway begins operations over the leased Fort Wayne, Jackson and Saginaw Railroad.

=== October events ===
- October 10 – Departure 'Train Éclair de luxe', the test train for the Express d'Orient, the later Orient Express, from Paris (Gare de Strasbourg) to Wien (return arrival at Paris on October 14).
- October 16 – The Nickel Plate Road runs its first trains over the entire system between Buffalo, New York, and Chicago, Illinois.
- October 25 – The Seney Syndicate sells the Nickel Plate Road to William H. Vanderbilt for US$7.2 million.

=== Unknown date events ===
- Spring – The Atlantic and Pacific Railroad, later to become part of the Atchison, Topeka and Santa Fe Railroad, building westward from Albuquerque, New Mexico, reaches Canyon Diablo, Arizona.
- Transcaucasian Railway reaches Baku on the Caspian Sea.
- William Cornelius Van Horne becomes general manager of Canadian Pacific Railway.
- Minerva Car Works, later to become part of American Car and Foundry, is founded in Minerva, Ohio.

== Births ==
=== February births ===
- February 4 – L. B. Billinton, Locomotive Engineer for London, Brighton and South Coast Railway 1912–1923 (d. 1954).

=== August births ===
- August 25 – Richard Paul Wagner, locomotive designer for Deutsche Reichsbahn 1922–1942 (d. 1953).

=== September births ===
- September 19 – Oliver Bulleid, chief mechanical engineer of the Southern Railway (Great Britain) 1937–1948, born in New Zealand (d. 1970).

== Deaths ==
=== December deaths ===
- December 6 – Alfred Escher, Swiss railway promoter (b. 1819)
- December 24 – Charles Vincent Walker English railway telegraph engineer (b. 1812).

=== Unknown date deaths ===
- John Cooke, superintendent of Rogers Locomotive and Machine Works and founder of Cooke Locomotive Works (b. 1824).
- John P. Laird, Scottish engineer who designed and patented the two-wheel equalized leading truck for steam locomotives (b. 1826).
