= Spuyten Duyvil station =

Metro-North Railroad station in the Bronx, New York

Spuyten Duyvil
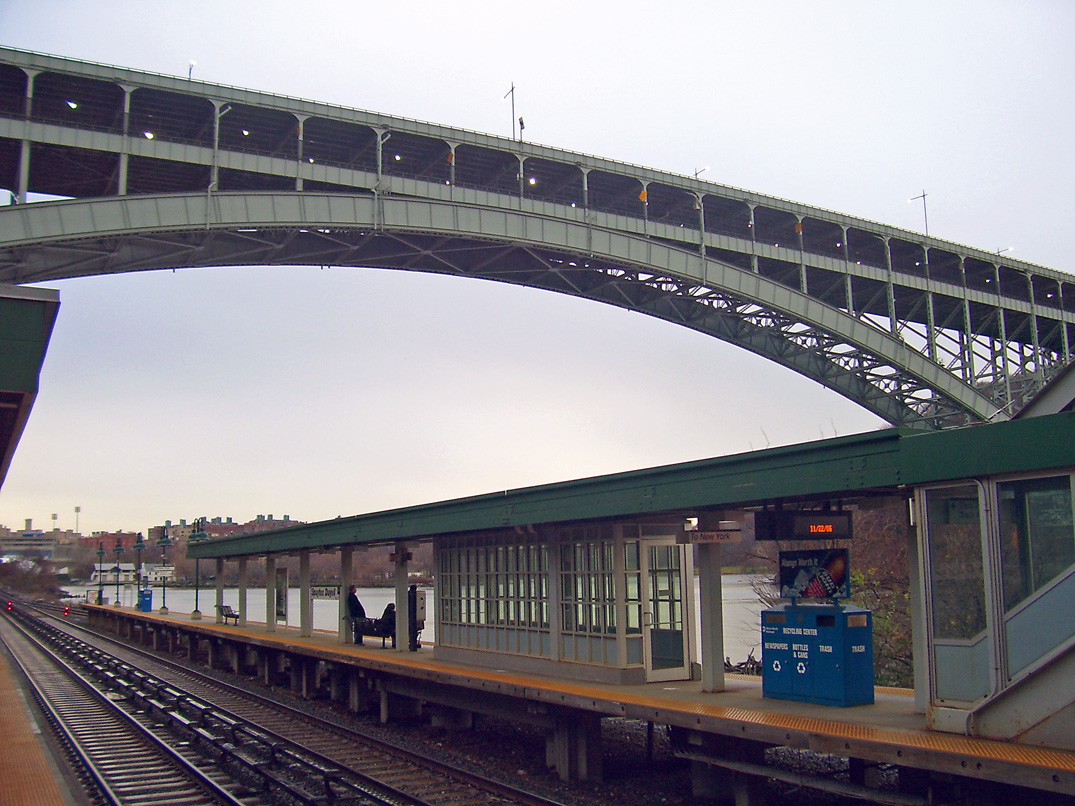
- The Henry Hudson Bridge above the Spuyten Duyvil platform.

General information
- Location: Edsall Avenue; Spuyten Duyvil, Bronx, New York
- Coordinates: 40°52′44″N 73°55′22″W
- Owner: Metro-North Railroad
- Line: Hudson Line
- Platforms: 1 side platform and 1 island platform
- Tracks: 3
- Connections: Hudson Rail Link: J, K, L, M

Construction
- Parking: Yes
- Accessible: yes (northbound platform only)

Other information
- Fare zone: 2

Passengers
- 2018: 1,138 (Metro-North)
- Rank: 52 of 109

Services
Preceding station	Metro-North Railroad	Following station
Riverdale toward Croton–Harmon	Hudson Line	Marble Hill toward Grand Central

Former services
Preceding station	New York Central Railroad	Following station
Riverdale toward Peekskill	Hudson Division	Marble Hill toward New York
Location

Spuyten Duyvil station is a commuter rail stop on the Metro-North Railroad's Hudson Line, serving the Spuyten Duyvil neighborhood of the Bronx, New York City.

As of August 2006, daily commuter ridership was 913 and there were 100 parking spots. More than half of the commuters travel to the station using the Hudson Rail Link bus.

== History ==
=== Fires and vandalism ===
Through the 1950s and the 1960s, the New York Central Railroad depot at Spuyten Duvyil was subject to frequent vandalism. Throughout this time period, multiple stations were also subjected to fires, including Marble Hill (1951 and 1960) and Mount Saint Vincent stations (1957). The railroad let the station depots at Spuyten Duyvil be subject to damage, with the windows on the wooden structure boarded up and broken. The depot was always locked and only staff was an employee to sell monthly commutation tickets. There were complaints about the stairways being closed, requiring people to cross the tracks. Vandalism was also common, along with common crimes such as burglary. Someone stole the oil heater from the depot in 1956. The southbound depot caught fire in 1956 as well. The railroad tried to sell the northbound depot in 1957 for uses other than a railroad station, but no one took advantage.

On July 29, 1957, the station caught fire at 7:20 a.m. The New York Central suspended service along the Hudson Division. The fire was under control by 8:44 a.m., but the railroad congestion took a while to be handled. More than 5,000 people were delayed from work to the damage. The damage to the station included the station depot, parts of the platform and parts of the stairway. The repairs were finished in August 1957. Locals wanted some changes in how buildings are maintained after the fire in July 1957, noting that the railroad did not even patrol the area to keep people from destroying the depot. In December 1957, the railroad razed the northbound depot, with all operations shifted to the southbound depot, rebuilt from the 1956 fire.

Yet another fire broke out on the morning of April 19, 1966. This fire engulfed more of the platform and the stairs leading down to the platform. However, this time, the fire department had trouble reaching the station due to poor parking by commuters and had to spend time getting the hoses down from nearby Johnson Avenue to fight with. The fire lasted 40 minutes and held up three trains. The railroad made quick repairs to ensure clean service on April 20.

However, the station depot burned for good on June 29, 1969, when the southbound station depot and the downtown platform caught fire once again. Around 2:30 p.m. that afternoon, the station building walls and platform. The platform itself had suffered a fire on June 24, taking out 30 feet (9.1 m) of the structure. The fires delayed some Penn Central Railroad trains, but not many due to a smaller Saturday schedule. Despite extinguishing both fires, no one could answer the source of the blaze. A lean-to that was built for Spuyten Duyvil burned down in the winter of 1958–1959. Despite that, a building was constructed for the maintenance crews to use, leaving the commuters exposed to the elements. This included using the stairs as shelters for rain. The railroad put up two three-sided "chicken coop" shelters for commuters to use, to their displeasure. The residents put up signs referring to the shelters as "'roosters" and "hens" to voice their displeasure.

Local pressure led to some bowing from the New York State Public Services Commission in February 1970, who promised the commuters a new, larger shelter above their heads at the station. The new structure would include infrared heaters to keep the commuters warm. However, that was not the end of the fires at Spuyten Duyvil. The northbound platform, the scene of multiple fires, burned down once again on July 21, 1970. This fire leveled the wooden northern platform.

=== Accidents ===
In 1882, a local train of the New York Central and Hudson River Railroad collided with a stopped express a mile south of the station, killing eight, including New York State Senator Webster Wagner, found crushed between two luxury sleeper cars built by his company.

In July 2013, two trains derailed near the station. A freight train hauling garbage lost nearly half its cars between Spuyten Duyvil and Marble Hill, requiring four days to clean up before one of the tracks could be reopened. In December 2013, a passenger train derailment north of the station resulted in four passenger deaths (the first in the railroad's history) and 75 injuries.

== Station layout ==
The station has two high-level platforms. Northbound trains utilize an eight-car-long side platform, while southbound trains use a four-car-long island platform. Directly east (railroad south) of the station, Track 4 merges with Track 2. Directly west (railroad north) of the station, Amtrak's Empire Corridor services merges with the Hudson Line.

Originally, a wye existed at this station, connecting the current Track 4 with the Spuyten Duyvil Bridge. This was used by Hudson River Railroad and later New York Central trains, however passenger service ended in 1916. However, the wye track remained extant as late as 1998, but had been removed by 2011, according to topographic maps.
