= Spuyten Duyvil Bridge =

Bridge between Manhattan and the Bronx, New York

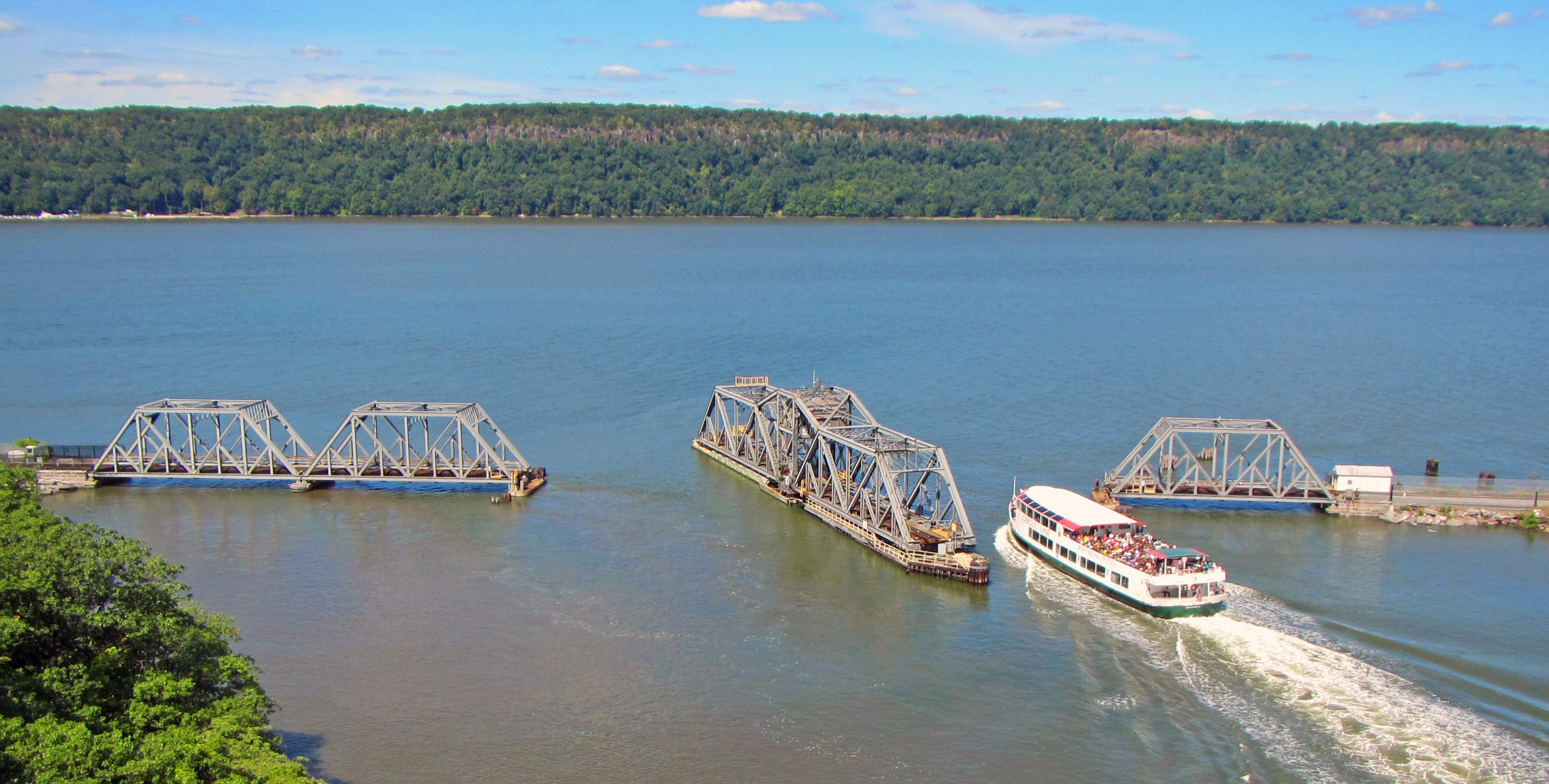
- Circle Line boat passing through bridge, 2014
- Coordinates: 40°52′42″N 73°55′32″W
- Carries: Amtrak West Side Line/Empire Connection (1 track)
- Crosses: Harlem River
- Locale: Manhattan and the Bronx, New York City

Characteristics
- Design: Railroad swing bridge
- Total length: 610 feet (190 m)
- Longest span: 286 feet (87 m)
- Clearance below: 5 feet (1.5 m)

History
- Opened: 1900

Location
- Interactive map of Spuyten Duyvil Bridge

The Spuyten Duyvil Bridge is a railroad swing bridge that spans the Spuyten Duyvil Creek between Manhattan and the Bronx, in New York City. The bridge is located at the northern tip of Manhattan where the Spuyten Duyvil Creek meets the Hudson River, approximately 1,000 feet (300 m) to the west of the Henry Hudson Bridge.

The Spuyten Duyvil Bridge was built to carry two tracks but now carries only a single track on the eastern side of the span. It is part of the West Side Line, and is used by Amtrak trains traveling along the Empire Connection. The span is used by approximately 30 trains a day and is opened over 1,000 times per year, primarily during the summer months for Circle Line Sightseeing Cruises and recreational vessels.

== History ==
A wooden railroad drawbridge across the Spuyten Duyvil was first constructed by the Hudson River Railroad in 1848. The railroad continued southward along the West Side Line to St. John's Park Terminal in Lower Manhattan and carried both freight and passenger service. The Hudson River Railroad merged with the New York & Harlem Railroad in 1869, creating the New York Central & Hudson River Railroad, and most trains started bypassing the bridge, instead going to Grand Central Terminal in Midtown Manhattan. An iron bridge replaced the wooden span by 1895.

The current steel bridge was designed by Robert Giles and constructed in 1900. The piers rest on pile foundations in the riverbed. The bridge consists of three fixed sections as well as a 290-foot-long (88 m) swing section, which can swivel nearly 65 degrees and leave a 100 feet (30 m) of clearance on each side. The swing span weighed 200 tons and had enough space to fit two tracks.

By 1935, there were 70 trains a day using the Spuyten Duyvil Bridge, but after World War II, usage declined. In 1963, the steam motor that powered the swing span was replaced with an electric motor. The bridge was slightly damaged three years later, when the swing span was struck by a boat, leaving it stuck in the open position for two weeks. Trains stopped running across the Spuyten Duyvil Bridge in 1982 and the following year the bridge was damaged by a vessel and was left unable to close.

The bridge was rehabilitated in the late 1980s. Amtrak's Empire Service began using the Spuyten Duyvil Bridge on April 7, 1991, following the completion of the Empire Connection. This involved the conversion of the abandoned West Side Line to accommodate passenger service and connect with Pennsylvania Station. Until then, Amtrak trains traveling between New York and Albany had utilized Grand Central Terminal.

In June 2018, Amtrak used the Left Coast Lifter, one of the world's largest floating cranes, to lift the 1.6 million pounds (730,000 kg) of the bridge's spans and move them to a barge in order to make fixes to electrical and mechanical components necessitated by damage due to Hurricane Sandy and years of malfunctions and corrosion. During the repairs, trains which had originated in Penn Station and used the bridge originated instead from Grand Central Terminal, bypassing the bridge. The trains returned to their regular routing to Penn Station on September 4.

== Incidents ==
- On the evening of February 16, 2004, an 80-year-old woman mistakenly drove her car onto the bridge from the Bronx side of the river and was hit by a Penn Station-bound Amtrak train. The passenger train carried the automobile for a distance of 250 feet (76 m) along the tracks. She survived with only minor injuries.
- During the early morning hours of October 24, 2010, a fire broke out on the bridge, suspending train service until later that evening.
- A boat ran into the bridge at around 4:20pm on May 29, 2016, causing major delays on the Empire Corridor, as the bridge was required to be inspected before trains could use it again. No injuries were reported in the incident.

== Gallery ==
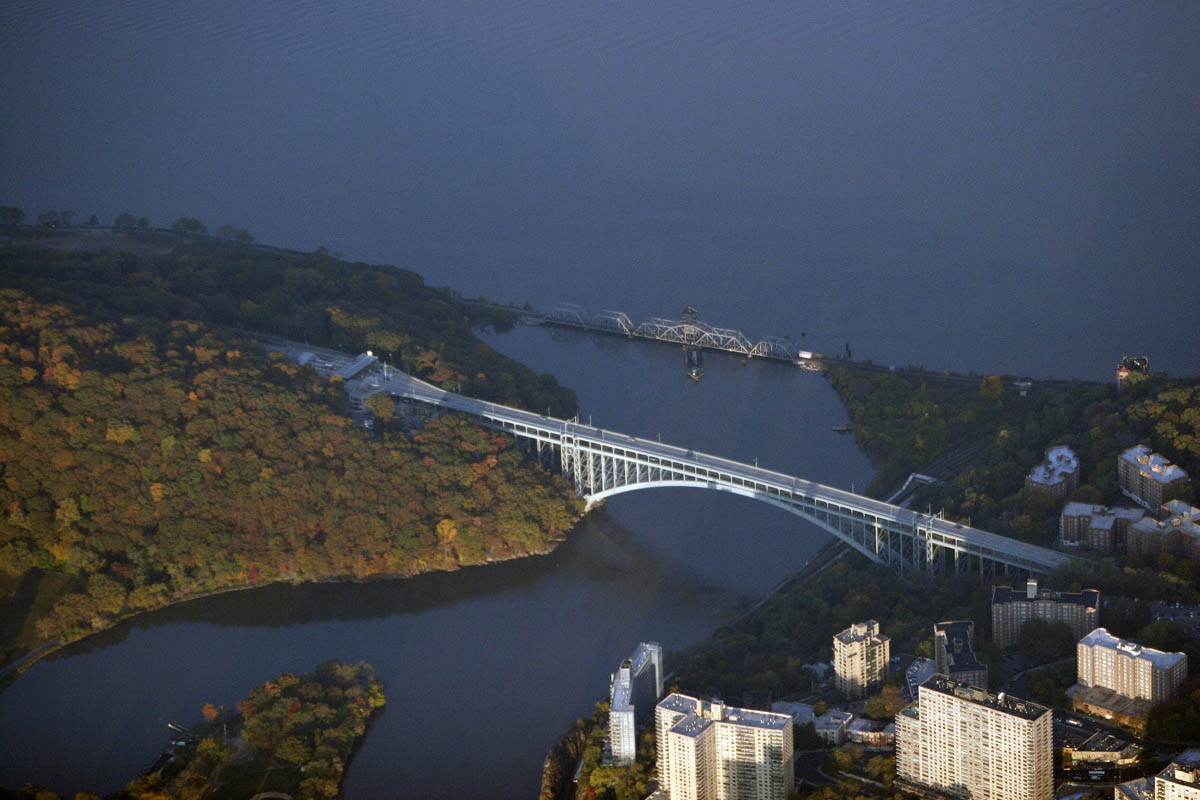
An aerial view showing the Henry Hudson Bridge (foreground) and the Spuyten Duyvil Bridge

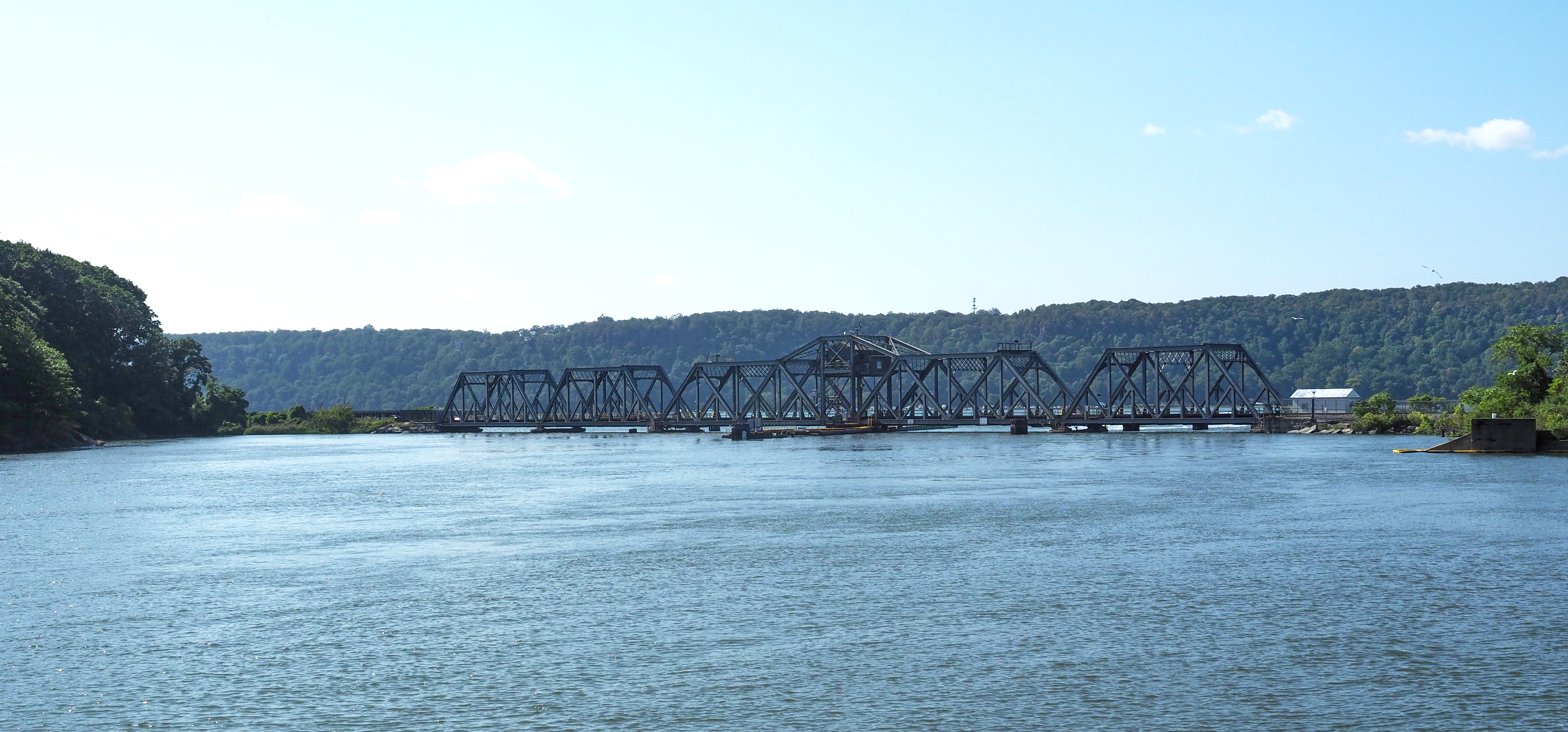
Spuyten Duyvil Bridge from the Spuyten Duyvil Metro North station.

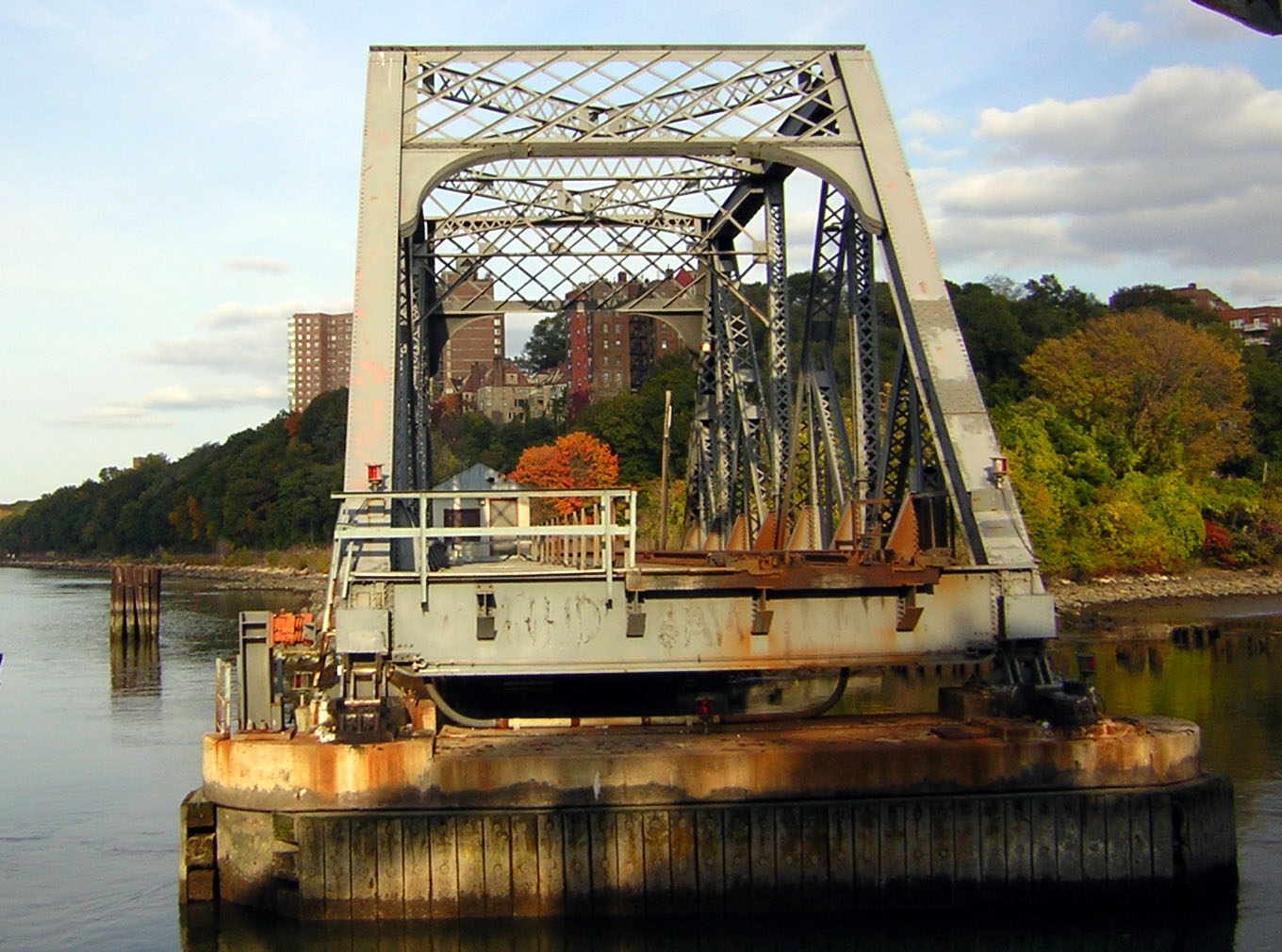
The Bronx end of the Spuyten Duyvil Bridge when the swing is open
