= Catanzaro (disambiguation) =

Catanzaro is a city in Italy.

Catanzaro may also refer to:

== People ==
- Angela Catanzaro, American television and film editor
- Anthony Catanzaro, American male fitness model
- Beatrice Catanzaro, Italian-Swedish artist
- Brittany Catanzaro, American sailor
- Chandler Catanzaro, American football player
- Kacy Catanzaro, American wrestler

== Other uses ==
- Province of Catanzaro, Italy
- Isthmus of Catanzaro, Italy
- US Catanzaro 1929, Italian football club based in Catanzaro
- 64th Infantry Division "Catanzaro", infantry division of the Royal Italian Army during World War II
- 141st Infantry Regiment "Catanzaro", inactive Italian Army infantry unit

== See also ==
- Catanzarese (disambiguation)
