= Haverstraw Bay =

Widest portion of the Hudson River

Coordinates: 41°12′09″N 73°55′50″W

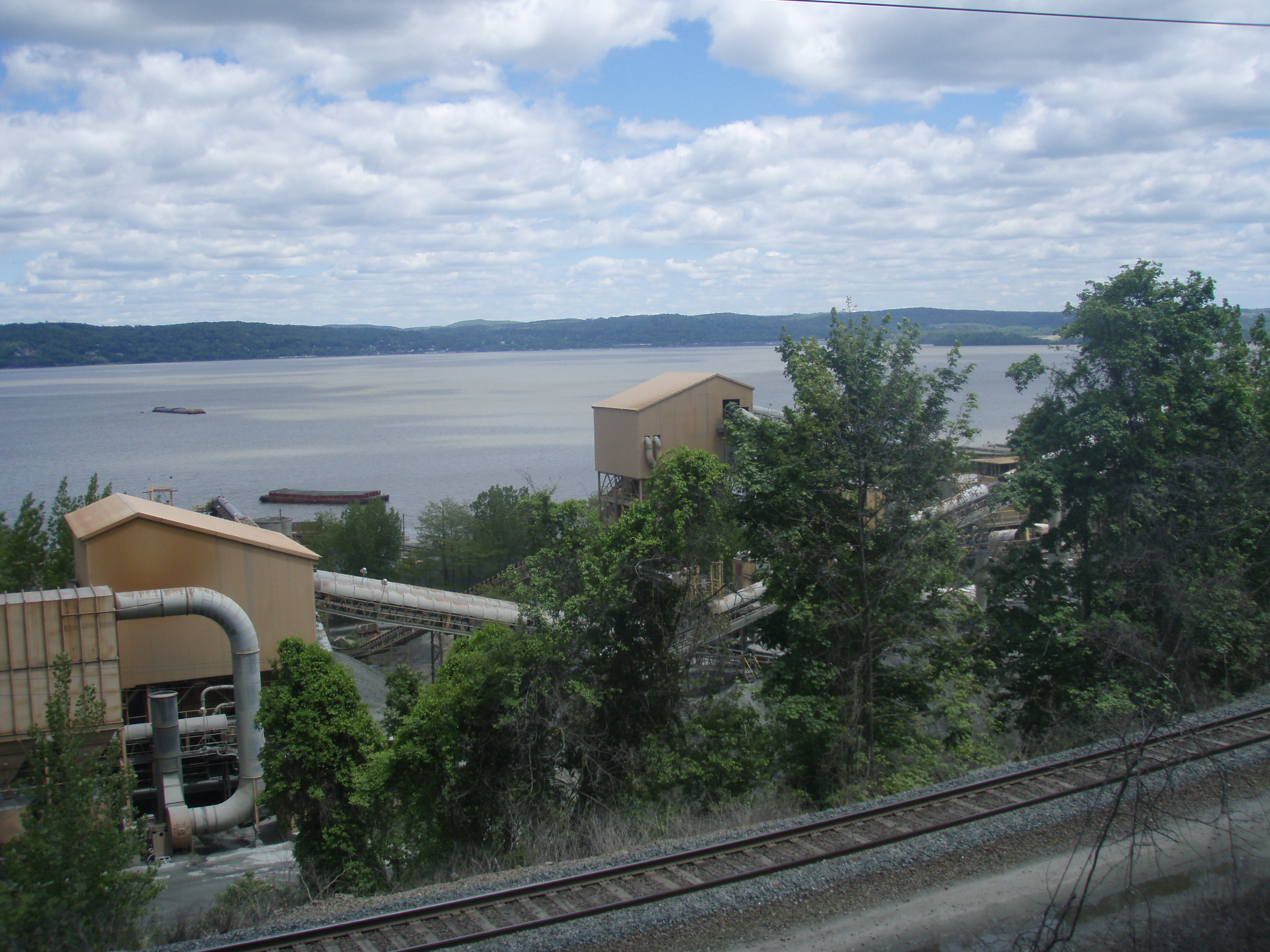
Haverstraw Bay as seen from Haverstraw

Haverstraw Bay, located in New York, is the widest portion of the Hudson River. The width of Haverstraw Bay is approximately 3.4 miles (5.5 km), the length approximately 5 miles (8.0 km) from river kilometer 58 (river mile 36) at Croton Point to river kilometer 66 (river mile 41) at Stony Point. The bay is bordered by the village of Haverstraw, in Rockland County, to the west and the village of Croton-on-Hudson, in Westchester County, to the east.

== Geography ==
Location of bay in the Hudson River

Haverstraw Bay is bordered to the west by the town and village of Haverstraw and to the east by the northern portion of the town of Ossining, village of Croton-on-Hudson and the southern portion of the town of Cortlandt. Haverstraw Bay is approximately 35 miles (56 kilometers) to the north of New York City. A major feature of the bay is the large peninsula that forms its southern downstream border, Croton Point, which juts almost halfway across the Hudson from the eastern shore. Croton Point Park is a popular birding location, including frequent sightings of the bald eagle. The moderately saline bay is the northern, upstream boundary of the lower Hudson River estuary.

== Ecology ==
The bay's physical and biological characteristics make it one of the most significant estuarine areas in the Hudson River. The bay is deeper on its western side with a shipping channel of minimum 32 feet in depth and 300 feet in width. The bay's eastern side is shallower with most of that section of bay not more than 10 feet deep. Shallow depths with ample sunlight lead to robust aquatic vegetation. Inflows of brackish Atlantic Ocean water overlaid with fresh stream water promote a nutrient rich environment for myriad invertebrate, fish, and bird species. The bay's ecology plays a central role in the health of fish populations in the Hudson River, including the endangered shortnose sturgeon and the larger, more abundant atlantic sturgeon. New York State has designated Haverstraw Bay a "Significant Coastal Fish and Wildlife Habitat". Up to the mid-1950s, Haverstraw Bay was once a productive oyster habitat. As with the rest of the Hudson, at the microbial level the bay's health is affected by oxygen concentrations. The bay's water chemistry is affected by rain fall, tidal variations, and human induced waste and runoff, as well as by seasonal changes in temperature and light.

== History ==
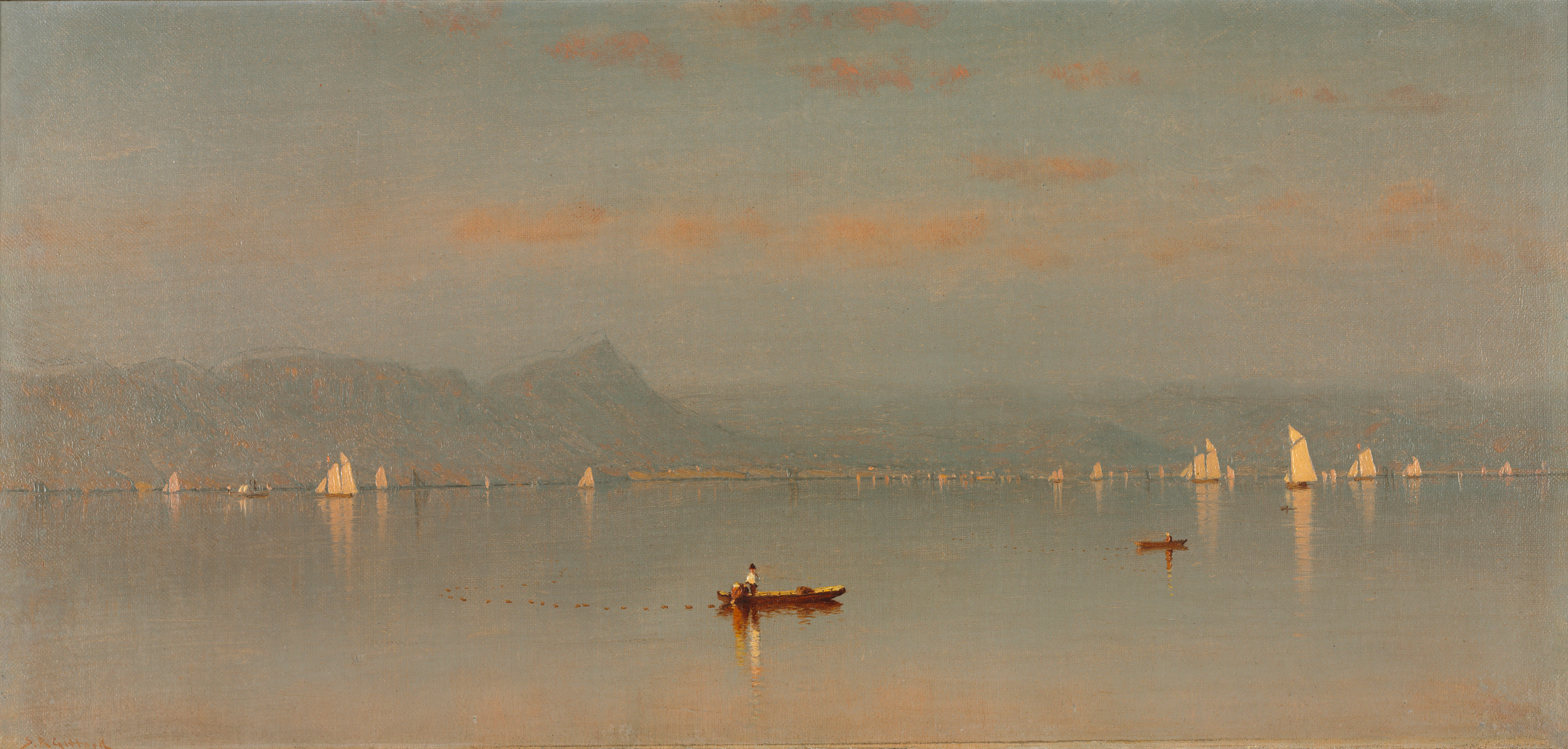
Sanford Robinson Gifford's Morning in the Hudson, Haverstraw Bay, 1866

In 1609, the Dutch East India Company had financed English navigator Henry Hudson to search for the Northwest Passage. In an attempt to find this undiscovered route, Henry Hudson decided to sail his ship up the river that would later be named after him (Hudson River). As he continued up the river, its width expanded, into Haverstraw Bay, leading him to believe he had successfully reached the Northwest Passage.

In 1780, spy Major John André landed at Snedeker's Landing (a.k.a. Waldberg Landing) on the west shore of the bay in the woods below Haverstraw village to meet Benedict Arnold.

In 1801, Charles Willson Peale traveled up the Hudson and sketched Stony Point from the bay.

The bay appears in the 1975 James Lincoln Collier and Christopher Collier novel, My Brother Sam Is Dead.

The bay is currently traversed by NY Waterway's Haverstraw–Ossining Ferry.

== Tourism ==
=== Landmarks and places of Interest ===
- Rockland County September 11 Memorial at Haverstraw Bay Park.
