= New Jersey School Report Card =

Annual performance report on the schools and school districts of New Jersey

New Jersey State Seal

The New Jersey School Report Card is an annual report produced each year by the New Jersey Department of Education for all school districts and schools in the U.S. state of New Jersey. The current School Report Card presents thirty-five fields of information for each school in the following categories: school environment, students, student performance indicators, staff, and district finances; however, initially the cards provided far less information.

The report cards were first proposed in 1988 by Governor Thomas Kean and mailed out in 1989. Although various types of school report cards had been released in California, Illinois, and Virginia, New Jersey was the first to send the reports home to parents and make them available to all taxpayers. In 1995, the New Jersey legislature passed a law expanding the scope of the report cards to include more financial matters and the withholding of state aid to inefficient schools. This was part of Governor Christine Todd Whitman’s push to decrease administrative costs in education. The report cards are still issued, and their annual release attracts attention in large papers such as the New York Times.

== History ==
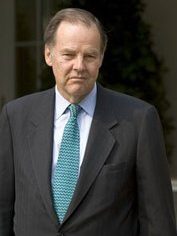
Governor Thomas Kean, who first proposed the New Jersey School Report Card

Governor Thomas Kean first broached the idea of school report cards in his 1988 State of the State address. He argued that "the more parents know, the more involved they can be. This is a way to arm them with that knowledge." The proposal initially faced strong opposition, and in the spring of 1988 some superintendents refused to release their test score data to the state because they feared it would be used in the report cards. The schools eventually consented to release the data and no report cards were issued that year.

In February 1989 Kean announced that report cards would be shipped for the first time that fall. They were released as planned that November. The first report cards did not offer a comparison or ranking of schools, and the version sent home to parents only included information about their individual school and the statewide averages. The released information included SAT and standardized test scores, student-teacher ratios, hours of instruction, attendance rates, and the average cost per pupil. Saul Cooperson, then the New Jersey State Education Commissioner, insisted that the point of the reports was not to rank districts or make comparisons between them; however, many reporters did just that. One statistic that received a large amount of coverage was that Newark spent $1,237 more per student than Sparta, but still had SAT scores that were 278 points lower on average.

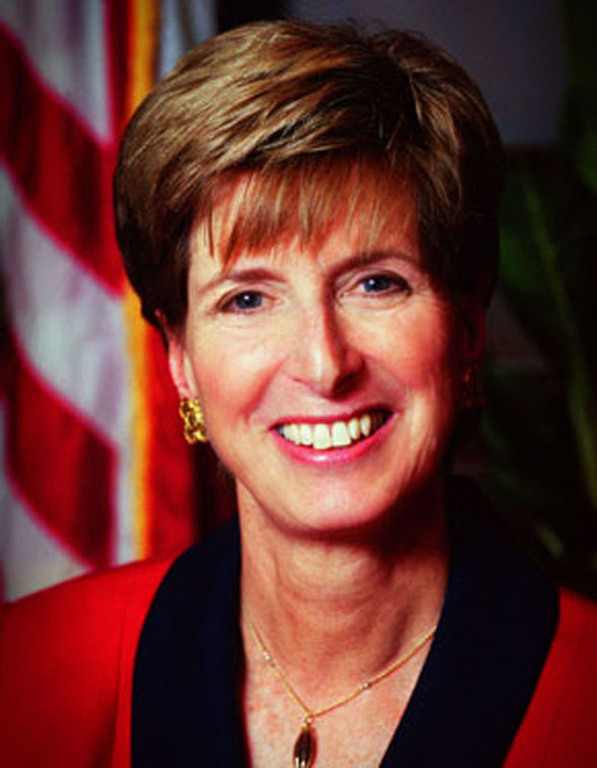
Governor Christine Todd Whitman who led the 1995 expansion

Throughout the early 1990s, the reports continued to be published and remained a popular subject for papers like The Philadelphia Inquirer and The New York Times. Additional statistics began to be tracked, including average teacher salaries and state and federal aid.

In the mid 1990s, Governor Christine Todd Whitman began making a drive for increased efficiency in education. At that point, New Jersey had administrative costs per pupil of $1,700, the highest cost of any state in the nation. In the summer of 1995, the New Jersey Legislature passed a bill enabling state aid to be withheld from schools that spent more than 30% on administrative costs and requiring the release of more financial data. The bill was signed into law by Governor Whitman on August 23, 1995.

The report cards are still released annually. Their contents have evolved over the years, such as the addition of Advanced Placement Program (AP) data in 2002. However, the main focus has remained unchanged and their contents continue to be reported on by large local papers.

== Criticism ==
The New Jersey School Report Card program has been criticized by education professionals and activists for being unhelpful, making unfair comparisons and oversimplifying difficult issues. James A. Moran, the executive director of the New Jersey Association of School Administrators said "We don't believe it will do good for the students of New Jersey or the school districts." The state's largest teachers union, the New Jersey Education Association, said through spokesman Roger Broderick, "In and of itself, the card has no value." The NJEA also believed that it would cause unfair comparisons, saying through a separate spokesman: "Regardless of the positive attitude the Governor and Commissioner seem to be putting forth, they're still going to be comparing a Camden to a Livingston." Philip Esbrandt, superintendent of the Cherry Hill Public Schools, said that many of the released numbers "don't convey an accurate picture of things." Susan Fuhrman of the Center for Policy Research in Education "My major concern is that parents, citizens, and real-estate agents will draw very simplistic conclusions."

== Praise ==
Although it has many critics, the Report Card also has many defenders. The Parent-Teacher Association of New Jersey has supported the initiative since the beginning. James O'Neill of The Philadelphia Inquirer has argued that the cards opponents are excessively defensive. "For every statistic that jumps out of the school report cards as an extreme, there probably is a district official who can provide an explanation for it." The New Jersey Report Card program was selected for one of the National Governors Association’s "Ideas That Work" in 1996. It was discussed at their annual conference, and a pamphlet describing its popularity with taxpayers and effectiveness was published by the NGA that year.
