= Newburgh–Beacon Ferry =

Discontinued Passenger ferry in New York

Newburgh-Beacon Ferry

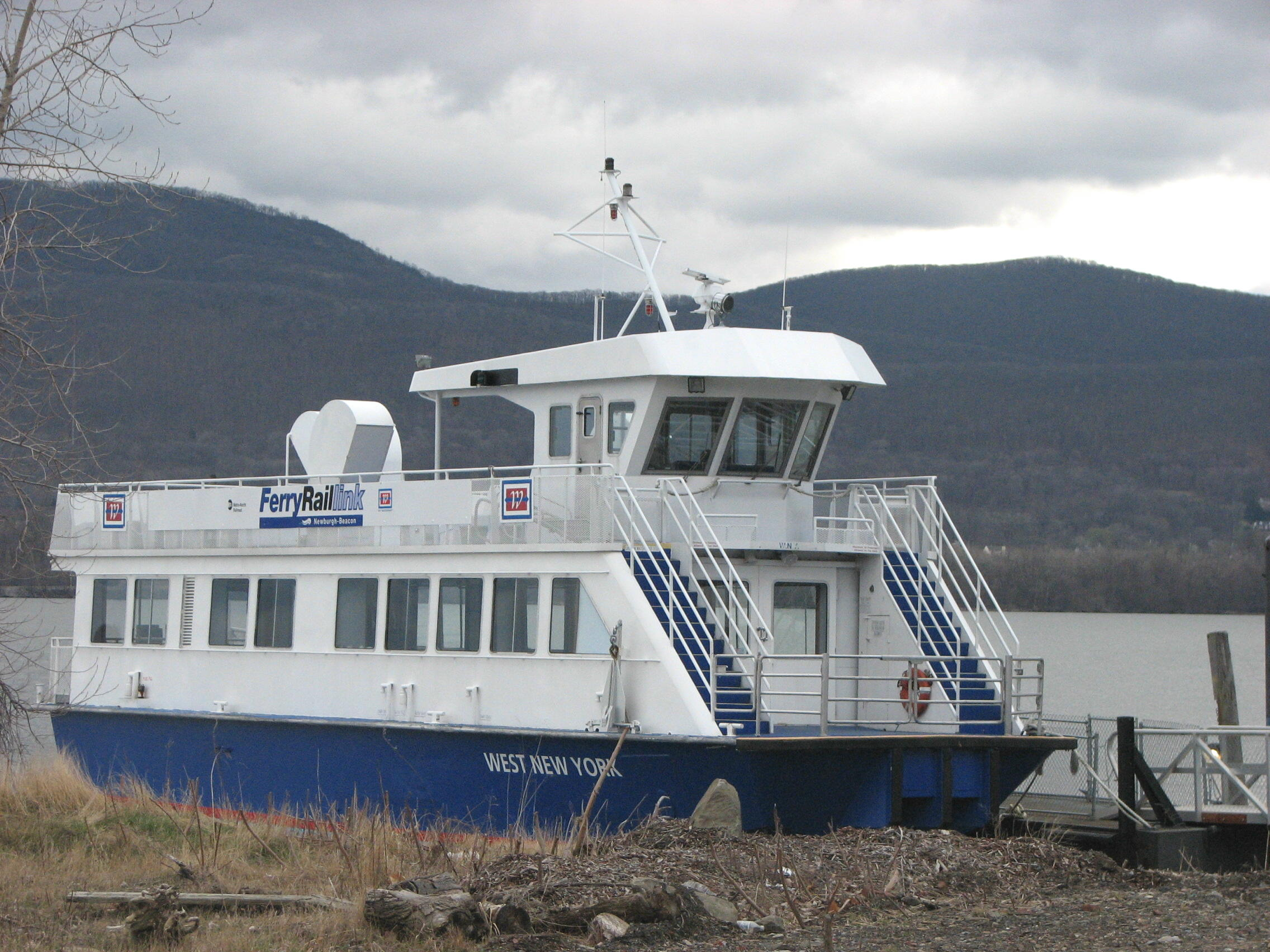
- West New York moored at Newburgh
- Locale: Newburgh Bay
- Waterway: Hudson River
- Transit type: Catamaran
- Carries: Passengers
- Terminals: Newburgh, Beacon, NY, United States
- Operator: NY Waterway
- Authority: MTA
- Began operation: October 17, 2005
- Ended operation: January 2025
- Travel time: 10 minutes
- No. of vessels: 1 (Captain Mark Summers)
- Yearly ridership: 30,000 (2023)
- Connections at Beacon
- Train: Metro-North Hudson Line
- Bus: Dutchess County Public Transit G; Leprechaun Lines Newburgh-Beacon-Stewart Shuttle
- Connections at Newburgh
- Bus: All Newburgh Area Transit routes; Ulster County Area Transit Route X; Leprechaun Lines Newburgh-Beacon-Stewart Shuttle
- Airport: SWF via the Newburgh-Beacon-Stewart Shuttle

The Newburgh–Beacon Ferry was a ferry service crossing the Hudson River that connected Newburgh with Beacon in the U.S. state of New York. It carried passengers between the two cities during rush hour, primarily transporting commuters from the west side of the river at Newburgh to the commuter train station on the east side at Beacon where they could catch Metro-North Hudson Line service to Grand Central Terminal and other points in New York City.

NY Waterway operated the ferry under contract from the Metropolitan Transportation Authority (MTA); it still operates the Haverstraw–Ossining Ferry downstream. Service began in 2005 after the Newburgh–Beacon Bridge had, 42 years earlier, rendered over two centuries of ferry service obsolete. The Beacon terminal was at a dock immediately adjacent to the station; the Newburgh terminal was at the south end of Front Street. The fare was $1.75 per person and the trip across the river took approximately ten minutes. The ferry was suspended and replaced with buses in January 2025, and the MTA announced in July 2025 that service would be discontinued. Extra bus service (the new Newburgh-Beacon Bridge Shuttle bus service) has replaced the ferry starting January 2, 2026.

== History ==
Tradition has it that Native Americans regularly crossed the Hudson River at the point between what is now Beacon and Newburgh, long before Europeans arrived in America. In 1743, a formal ferry was established when Alexander Colden received a royal charter from King George II to carry passengers and goods for profit. The right to operate ferries between Beacon and Newburgh was bestowed upon the Ramsdell family by the heirs of Alexander Colden. They ran the ferry through the Steamboat Era until 1956, when NYSBA took over ferry services.

=== Before the bridge ===
By the early 20th century the fleet had grown to three 160-foot (49 m) coal-fired ferries, the Orange, Dutchess and Beacon, capable of carrying 30 vehicles each. It linked the two segments of NY 52, the major east–west artery at that point.

In the winter, ice was sometimes a problem. In the 1950s, one of the ferries got stuck in the ice. In fact, the NYSBA opened the Kingston bridge ahead of schedule because river ice was keeping the ferry in dock and people couldn't get to work. Similarly, people stalled on the Newburgh-Beacon ferry, en route to work at Nabisco, Texaco or the state prisons, had difficulty getting to work whenever ice trapped their boat and they had to wait for another one to clear a path to shore. If the ice was thick enough and solid enough, they simply walked — by the hundreds — back and forth.

=== Bridge opening and service discontinuation ===
The impetus for a bridge began with the opening in 1916 of Bear Mountain State Park. To improve access to the popular attraction, in 1924, the Bear Mountain Bridge opened—the first vehicular/pedestrian (non-railroad) bridge over the Hudson between New York City and Albany—and the ferry at Bear Mountain was discontinued.

The ferries were seen as past their day, due to their mounting financial and operational problems, even before the construction of the Newburgh-Beacon bridge. Increasing traffic on 52 by mid-century, coupled with the building of the New York State Thruway in the Hudson corridor, was straining the ferry beyond its breaking point. The state's Department of Public Works began planning for a bridge, but it was not a serious possibility until federal money became available through the construction of Interstate 84.

The last Hudson crossing to be built on the river's estuarine section below Albany was completed and opened to traffic on November 2, 1963. By that time the New York State Bridge Authority had already had to take them over. The next day, the Orange and Dutchess saluted each other midriver on their 5 p.m. runs.

The Orange and the Dutchess sailed from Newburgh for the last time on November 3, 1963, packed with people and cars. The bells on board and on shore tolled as the boats crossed the river in the early evening chill against the imposing silhouette of the Newburgh-Beacon Bridge, which had opened the day before. Ten minutes later, when the ferries docked in Beacon and disgorged their cargo, people got in their cars or hopped on the waiting buses and went home, over the new bridge.

The ferries, built in the early 1900s at the Newburgh shipyards, were sold. The Dutchess and Beacon, both in very decrepit condition, were sold as scrap. The Orange, in slightly better shape, was purchased and refurbished by Myles Rosenthal with the intent of turning it into a floating restaurant. It also was to carry visitors from Manhattan to the 1964 New York World's Fair. After only a few charter trips the boat fell victim to vandals, which led to it joining its sister vessels in oblivion later that year.

In the next decade, when the new bridge was stretched to capacity, the bridge was widened and a second span built. The end of ferry service resulted in decreased activity on Newburgh's once-vibrant waterfront, and in the early 1970s urban renewal led to much of the land being cleared in preparation for new construction projects that never came to fruition.

=== Revival ===
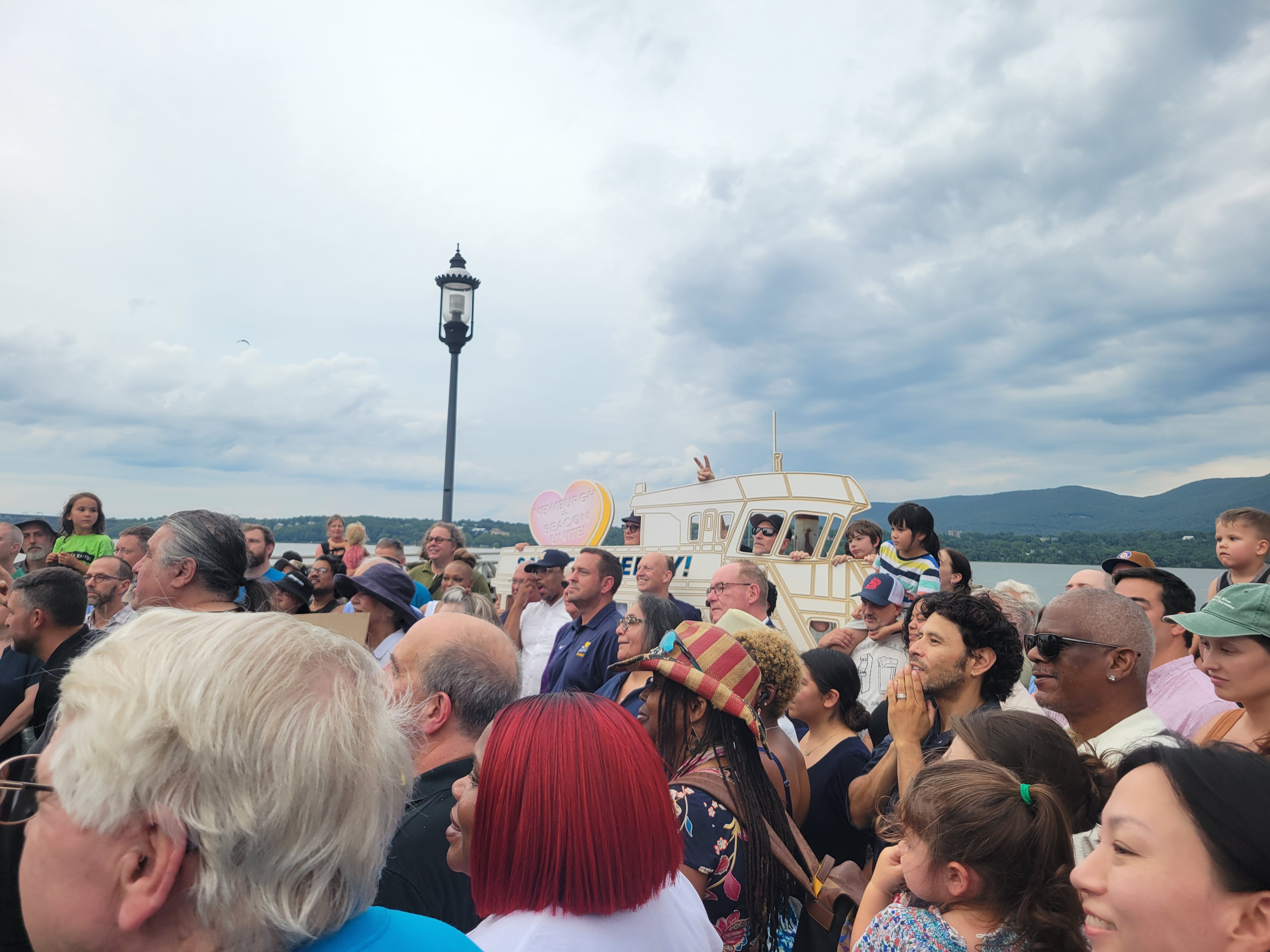
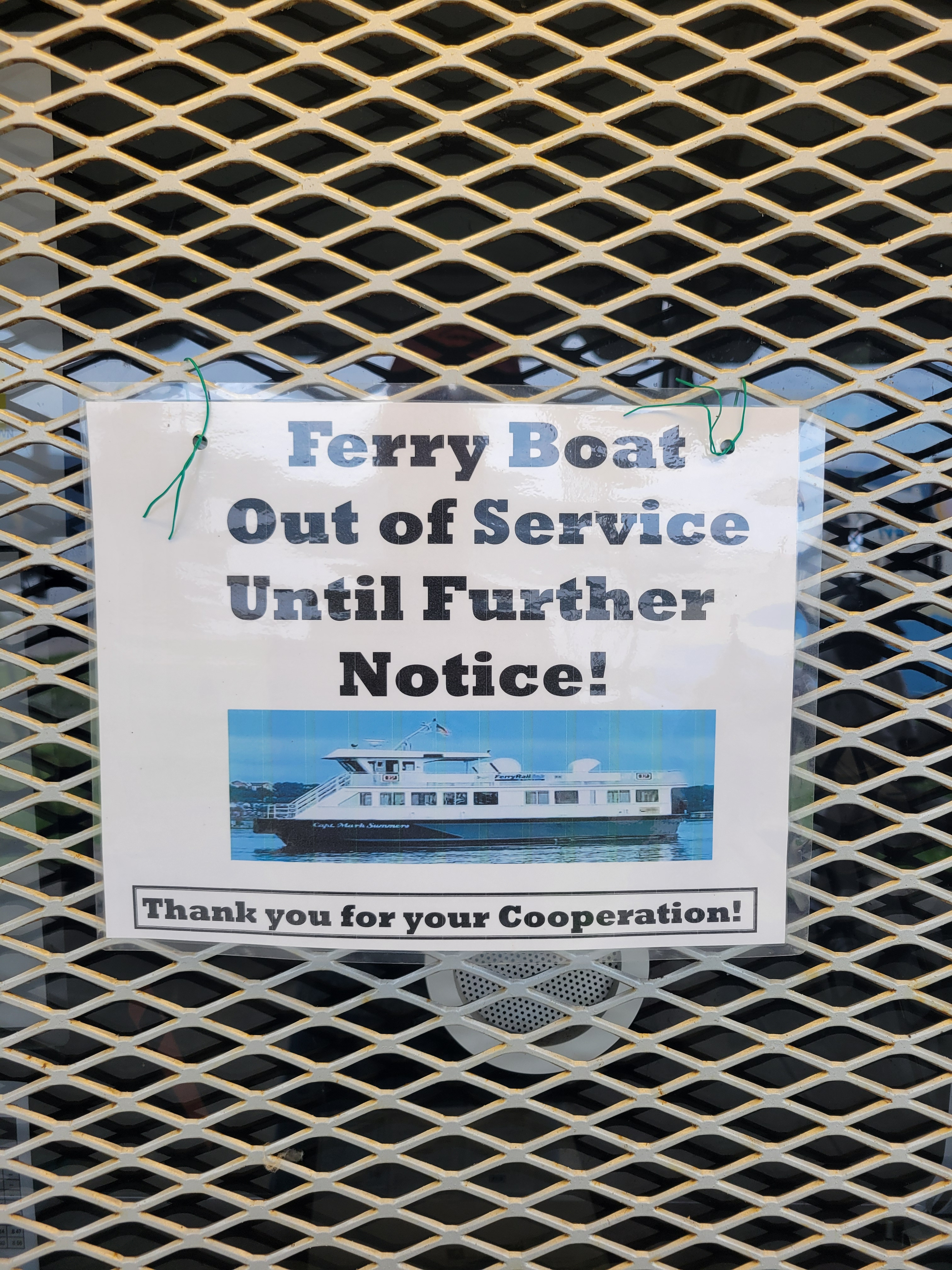
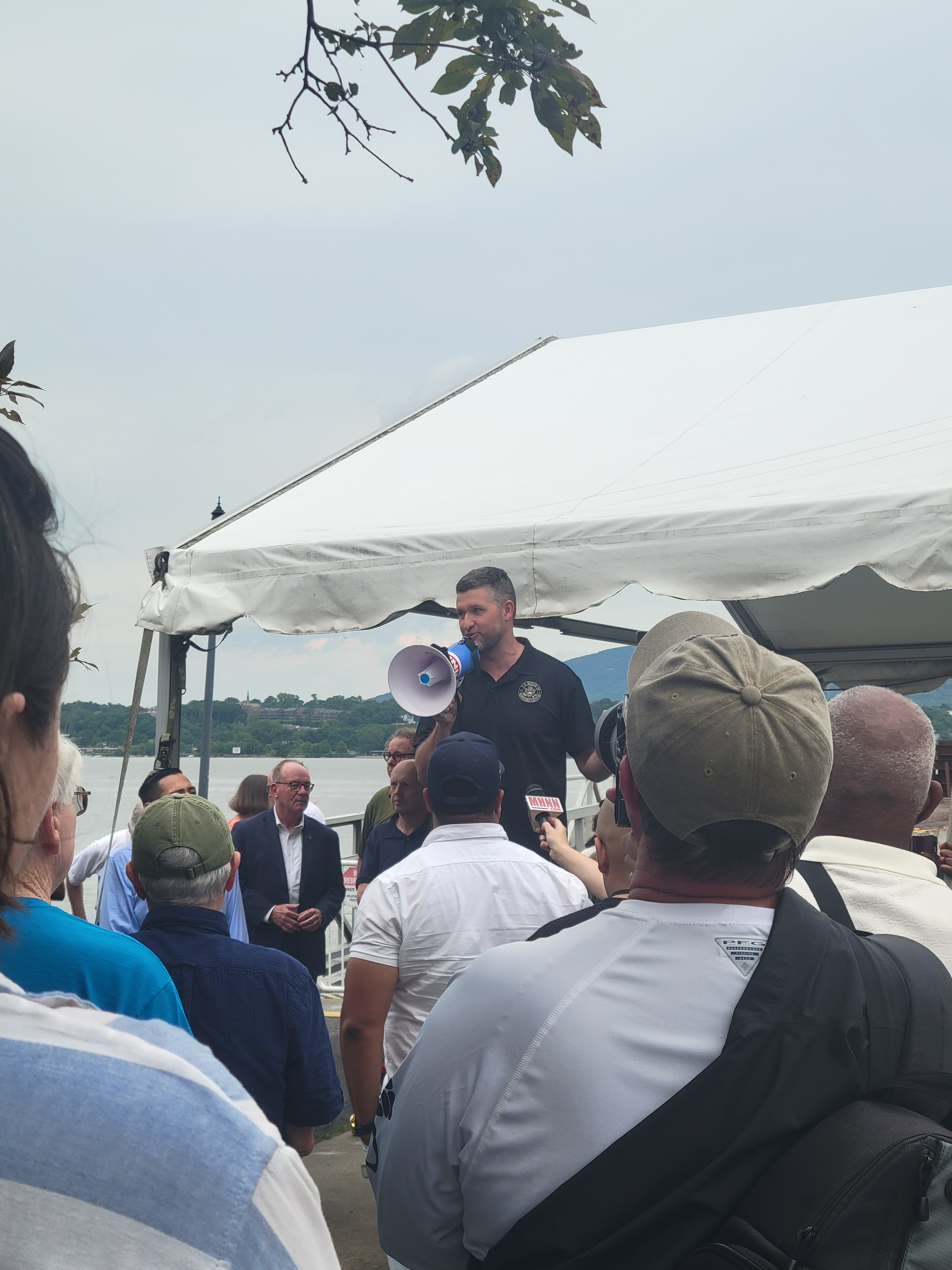
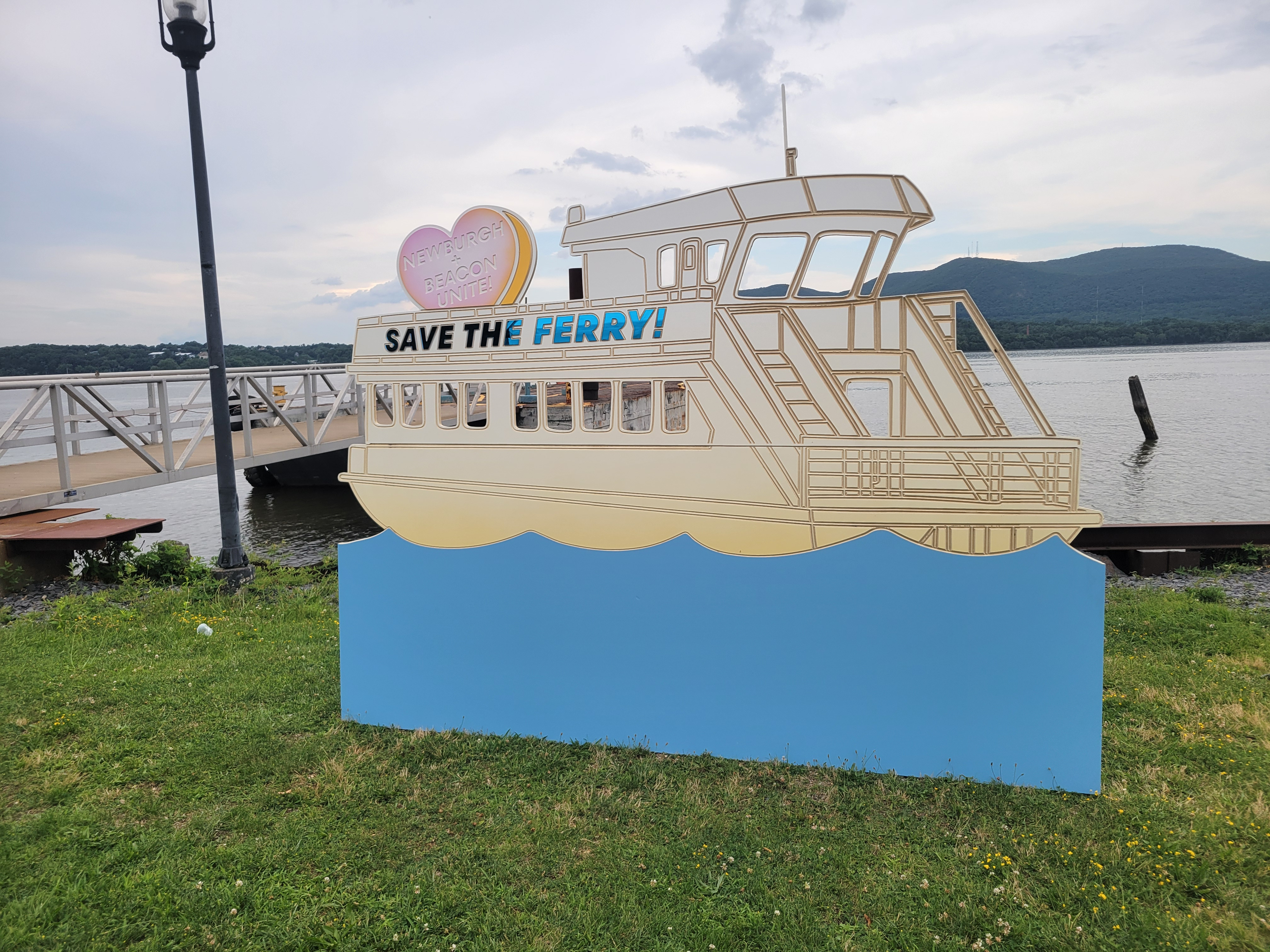
images from the "Save Our Ferry" rally held at the ferry pier in Newburgh on July 8, 2025

Increasing regional growth in the 1990s led to frequent traffic jams on the bridge and swamped parking lots at the train station. Interest grew in reviving ferry service, especially after the Metropolitan Transportation Authority (MTA)'s successful 2000 restoration of the Haverstraw–Ossining Ferry across a similarly wide portion of the river further south. However, plans never quite seemed to materialize despite considerable appropriations of money, and in the interim commuters had to be content with a shuttle bus across the bridge from the park and ride lot on NY 17K near its connection to the New York State Thruway. Meanwhile, MTA began for the first time to require parking permits at Beacon, and the waiting list swelled to at least 600 more than capacity, even after the lots were enlarged in the early 2000s.

Eventually, it was able, with the help of the region's congressional delegation, to secure a $1.1 million grant from the Federal Transit Administration to close the gap between fares and costs, along with other subsidies. Service resumed on October 17, 2005. To encourage use of the new ferry, no fares were charged for the remainder of that month.

The ferry achieved its maximum ridership in 2008, when 227 people rode the ferry on an average day, but ridership began to decline afterward. The ferry ceased operations from April 2020 through August 29, 2021 due to the COVID-19 reduction in MTA services.

On May 10, 2024, the MTA announced that it would implement a pilot program on June 30, 2024, to lower the cost of the monthly UniTicket by 93 percent from $14.50 to $1. By January 2025 ridership was at 62 daily passengers.

=== End of service ===
Starting in January 2025, the ferry was replaced with bus service due to damage to the Beacon landing. In July 2025, the MTA discontinued the ferry permanently, saying the move would save $2.1 million annually. The bus service continued to operate, charging the same $1.75 fare as the ferry. In response, local residents and U.S. representative Pat Ryan asked the MTA to restore ferry service. Although the frequency of the bus service was increased in late 2025, ferry advocates continued to advocate for the route's restoration. In 2026, local group Save the Ferry Community Coalition launched a fundraiser to amass $200,000 to operate a ferry on the same route during summer weekends. The Orange County Industrial Development Agency offered to donate $100,000 for this route. In October 2026, the Save the Ferry coalition hosted a temporary service for two weekends as a proof of concept for the ferry.

== Fleet ==
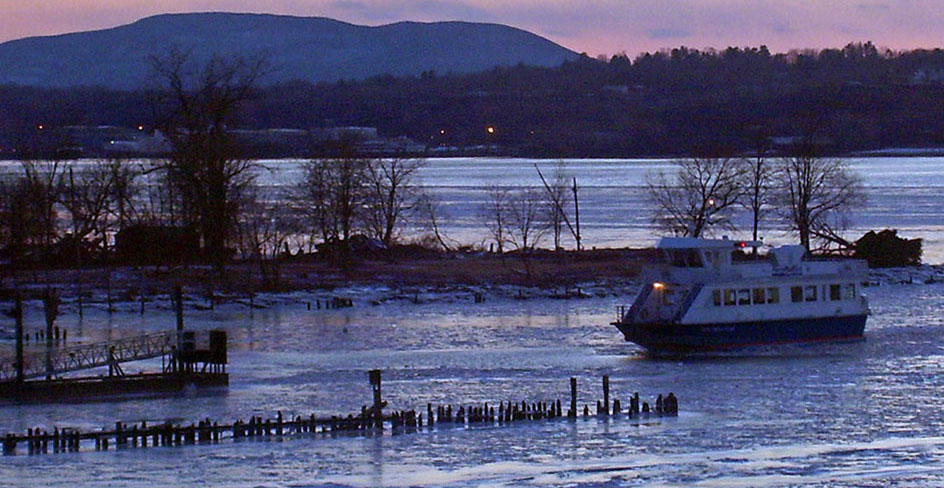
Ferry approaching Beacon terminal in winter.

The MTA moved the West New York, a boat which had been used to evacuate Lower Manhattan after the September 11, 2001 attacks, to Newburgh Bay to inaugurate its new service. It carried 149 passengers.

One major problem the MTA and NY Waterway had to overcome in planning was the ice floes that can sometimes clog the shallows near the riverbanks in cold weather, particularly on the Newburgh side. This situation is not encountered by its ferries downriver as the salinity of the river below the Hudson Highlands is high enough to prevent ice from forming in all but the coldest temperatures. However, while Newburgh Bay is typically below the river's salt front, ice from the freshwater sections often accumulates in it.

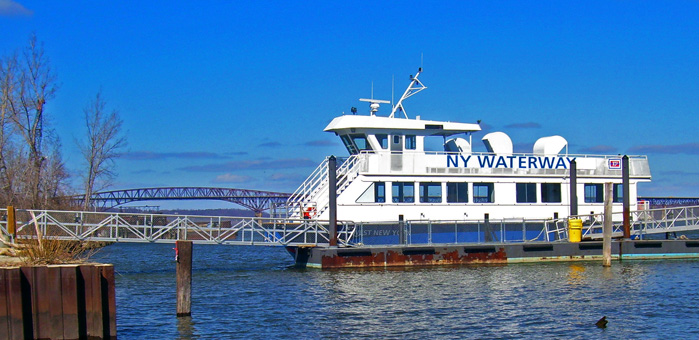
Newburgh-Beacon ferry West New York

The West New York was ultimately fitted with a strengthened hull and a closed cooling system to protect it. The vessel was also repainted with the "FerryRailLink" logo. The winter following the ferry's reintroduction was rather mild and the first ice-free winter on the Hudson in a long time, as was the first half of the following winter. On February 6, 2007, however, a cold snap had left enough ice at each bank that the MTA decided to do as it had done with the downriver ferry the day before and suspend service until conditions improved, renting buses to take commuters across the bridge in the meantime. Service was finally restored at the end of the month when a warming trend melted enough ice.

As of February 2023, the Captain Mark Summers had replaced the West New York on the route.

== Fares and schedule ==
A map showing the route of the ferry across the Hudson

A one-way ferry trip cost $1.75 per person. It could be paid at Newburgh and during the AM Rush only at Beacon or on board. The MTA, as is its practice, not only sold train tickets at the ferry terminals but encouraged riders to buy them there. For regular riders, a UniTicket package combining train and ferry fare for a month was available for $447.50. UniTicket purchasers were also covered by MTA's Guaranteed Ride Home program, whereby if the ferry is unable to operate they would be able to get a taxi to take them home or to their cars.

As of October 2024 there were seven ferry crossing during the AM peak hours and eight crossings during the PM peak. There were no crossings on weekends.

== Ridership ==
Annual ridership
Year	Ridership	% Change	Ref.
2024	31,950	+6.6%	
2023	29,959	+27.9%	
2022	23,569	+280.7%	
2021	6,191		
2020		-48.3% (Note: Service suspended April 2020 through August 29, 2021 due to the COVID-19 reduction in MTA services.)	
