= Haverstraw–Ossining Ferry =

Passenger ferry in New York

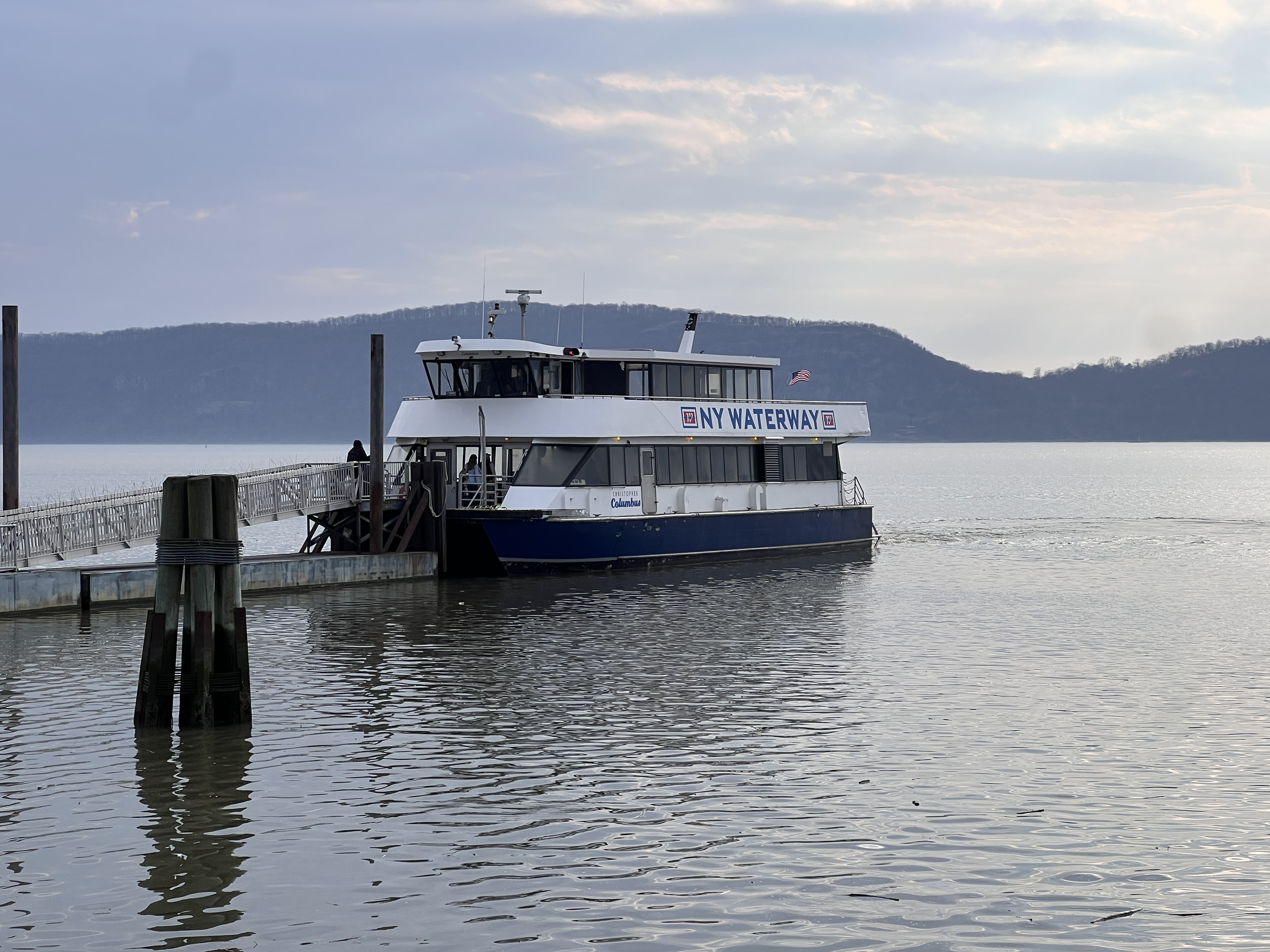
- Christopher Columbus at the Ossining dock in April 2024
- Locale: Rockland and Westchester Counties
- Waterway: Hudson River, Haverstraw Bay
- Transit type: Catamaran
- Route: FerryRailLink
- Carries: Passengers
- Terminals: Haverstraw and Ossining, New York, United States
- Operator: NY Waterway
- Authority: Metro-North Railroad and New York State Department of Transportation
- Began operation: September 5, 2000
- Travel time: 15 minutes
- Headway: 30 minutes
- Frequency: 29/day
- No. of vessels: 1, Admiral Richard E. Bennis. Currently using various other vessels due to construction.
- Daily ridership: 550
- Yearly ridership: Approximately 143,000
- Connections at Ossining
- Train: Metro-North Railroad: Hudson Line
- Bus: Bee-Line Bus System: 13, 19
- Connections at Haverstraw
- Bus: Transport of Rockland: 97, Weekend Ferry Shuttle

The Haverstraw–Ossining Ferry is a passenger ferry over the Haverstraw Bay and Hudson River, which connects Haverstraw with Ossining in the U.S. state of New York. The ferry operates during rush hours on weekdays only, primarily transporting commuters from the west side of the river to the Ossining Metro-North Railroad station on the east side, where they can transfer to Metro-North Railroad trains headed to Grand Central Terminal in New York City, or Croton-Harmon and Poughkeepsie, via its Hudson Line. The ferry has been in operation since September 2000.

== Docks ==
=== Haverstraw ===
The Haverstraw dock is located south of the village of Haverstraw, adjacent to the Harbors at Haverstraw development. Transport of Rockland's (TOR) 97 route deviates to serve this development, and also connects to the ferry dock. On weekends, TOR operates a shuttle to Nyack and the Palisades Center, timing with ferries. In addition, the 91 and 95 routes serve a stop in the center of the village, approximately 0.6 miles (0.97 km) north of the dock.

In December 2024, a new ferry terminal in Haverstraw opened.

=== Ossining ===
The Ossining dock is located in Henry Gourdine Park, west of the Ossining Metro-North station. In addition to Hudson Line trains, connections are also available at Ossining to the Bee-Line Bus System's 13 and 19 routes, which board at a busway on the east side of the station.

== Operation ==
The Weehawken, New Jersey–based NY Waterway ferry company has been operating the ferry under contract from the Metropolitan Transportation Authority (along with the Newburgh-Beacon Ferry upstream) since its incarnation on September 5, 2000. These two ferries are collectively branded as Ferry Rail Link, but this name is not used in common parlance.

The ferry operates exclusively in the AM and PM rush hours, with service operating in both directions during both AM and PM hours.

The fare is $4.50 per person ($2.25 for seniors and children 6 to 11 years old) and can either be purchased at the ticket booth at Haverstraw dock, or paid in cash only on board. A 10-trip ticket costs $38.75, and a monthly pass costs $100. UniTickets for combined ferry and rail travel are also available: to Grand Central, this costs $121 for a weekly pass and $343.50 for a monthly pass. The trip across the river takes approximately 15 minutes. The ferry operates at 20% of its full capacity on each trip, with 550 passengers per day as of 2009.

On May 10, 2024, the MTA announced that it would implement a pilot program on June 30, 2024, to lower the cost of the monthly UniTicket by 79 percent from $43.75 to $13.75 and that, on May 25, ferry service would begin to operate on weekends between 9:30 a.m. and 9:30 p.m.

== Fleet ==
The ferry currently uses various catamarans in New York Waterway's fleet, including Peter R. Weiss, Brooklyn, and Christopher Columbus. The ferry's usual vessel, the Admiral Richard E. Bennis, has been undergoing renovations in Mamaroneck, New York, since August 2022. On January 15, 2009, the Admiral Richard E. Bennis was among the many ships that helped evacuate stranded passengers of US Airways Flight 1549 on the Hudson River between New Jersey and Midtown Manhattan. Due to ice conditions on Haverstraw Bay which prompted NY Waterway to suspend service on the ferry that day, it was one of the vessels readily available for use at NY Waterway's main storage facility near the incident in Weehawken.

== Gallery ==
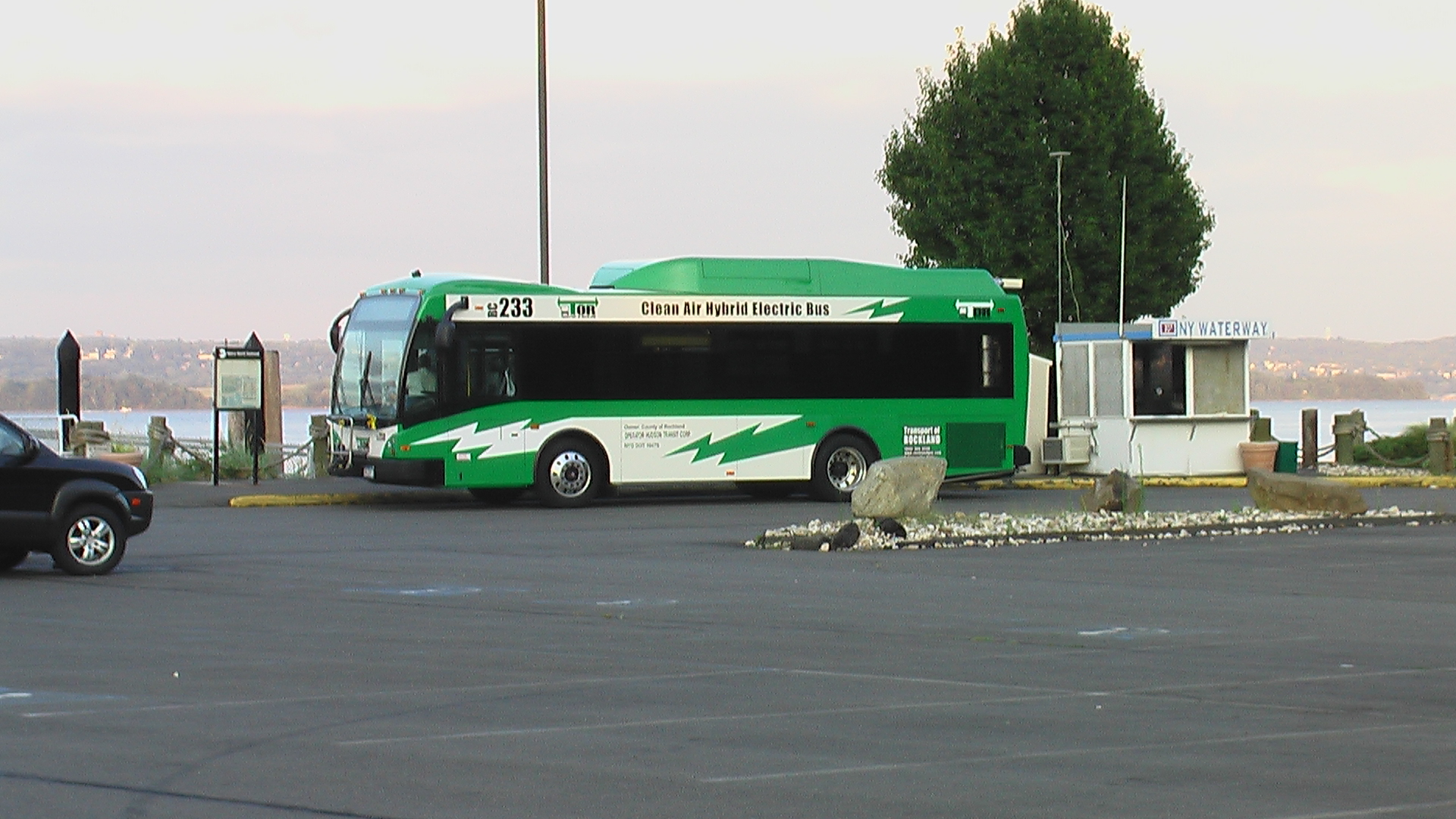
A Transport of Rockland bus at the Haverstraw Village ferry dock.

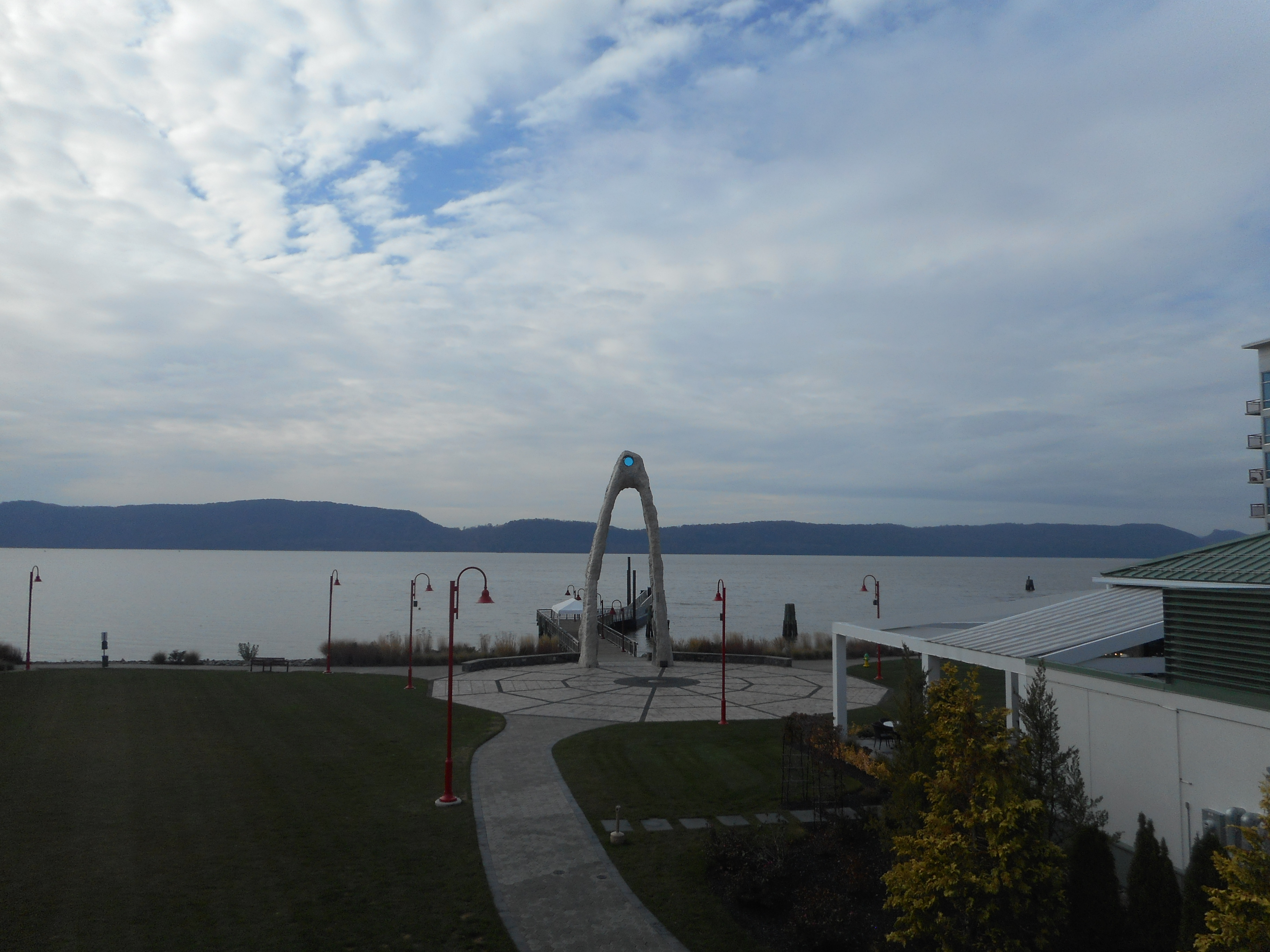
The Ossining Village ferry dock at Henry Gourdine Park.

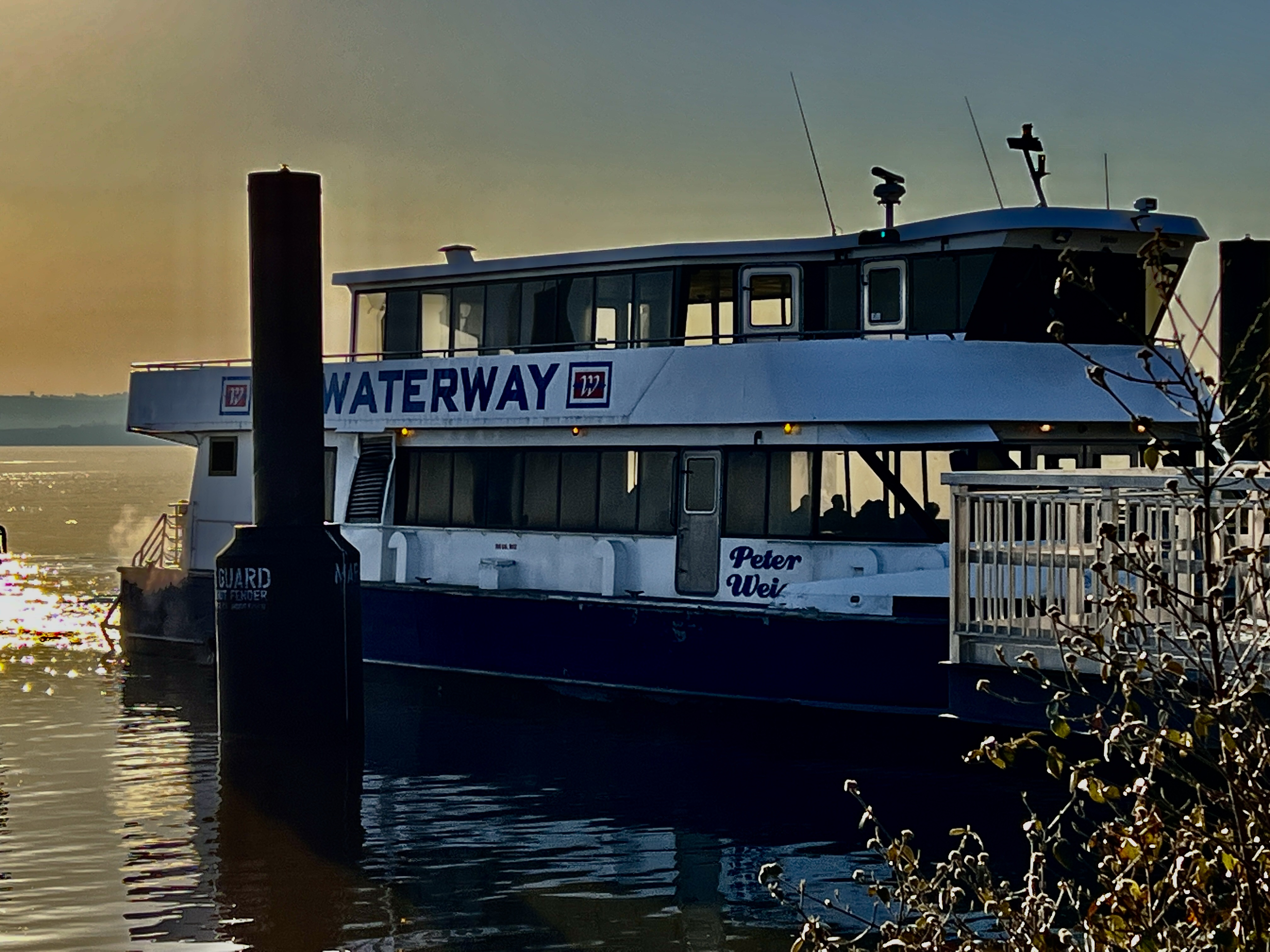
Peter R. Weiss at the Haverstraw dock in March 2023.

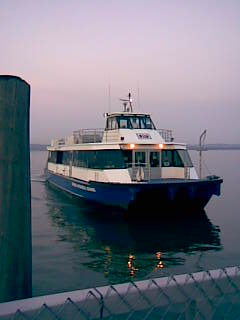
Admiral Richard E. Bennis at the Haverstraw dock in July 2008.
