= Governor Thomas H. Kean =

Ferryboat

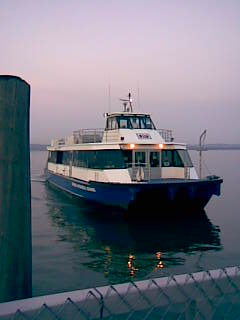
The Thomas H. Kean sister ship Admiral Richard E. Bennis approaching the Haverstraw, New York dock in July 2008

Governor Thomas H. Kean is a ferry operated by NY Waterway, a private transportation company that provides ferry and bus service in the Port Authority of New York and New Jersey.

The ferry is 78.5 feet (23.9 m) long, 28.5 feet (8.7 m) wide and has a draft of 8.5 feet (2.6 m). Passengers enter and exit from her bow.

The ferry is named in honor of Thomas Kean, who served as governor of New Jersey from 1982 until 1990 and as chairman of the 9/11 Commission following the September 11 attacks.

== Incidents ==
- On January 15, 2009, the ferry, under the command of Brittany Catanzaro, helped rescue passengers of US Airways flight 1549 after both engines of the plane failed, forcing it to make an emergency landing on the Hudson River.
- On November 3, 2017, the ferry rescued a man who had jumped into the Hudson. The jumper had stolen a cab just a few blocks away from his jump. After his rescue, crew members secured the man and turned him over to police, who, in turn, transferred him to the Bellevue Hospital for a mental health assessment.
- On May 15, 2019, Governor Thomas H. Kean rescued the pilot of a helicopter that ditched into the river.
