= Catanzarese =

Catanzarese may refer to:

- Any person, thing or concept of or from Catanzaro, in Calabria in southern Italy, including:
  - Catanzarese, one of the dialects of Calabria

== In agriculture ==
- Catanzarese (pig), an extinct breed of pig, a former sub-type of the Apulo-Calabrese
- Catanzarese, an alternative name for the Italian wine grape Magliocco Dolce

== Other uses ==
- U.S. Catanzaro 1929, a football club in Catanzaro
