= Brittany Catanzaro =

American sailor

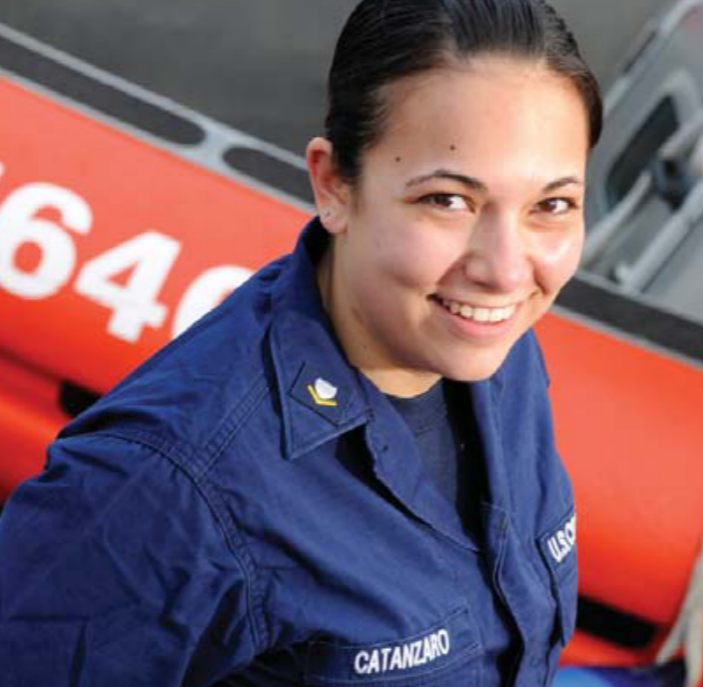
- Catanzaro in 2009
- Born: 1989 (age 36–37)
- Occupation: sailor
- Known for: commanded a vessel that rescued two dozen people

Brittany Catanzaro is an American sailor. She was the youngest individual appointed captain of a New York Waterways ferry, and the first woman appointed captain. Catanzaro captained the ferry Governor Thomas H. Kean, one of the vessels that responded to the emergency landing of US Airways Flight 1549, on the Hudson River. Catanzaro and her crew are credited with rescuing two dozen survivors.

Following the rescue the United States Coast Guard honored Coast Guard personnel who had distinguished themselves. Catanzaro is a member of the Coast Guard Reserve, and received a Meritorious Public Service Award.

Catanzaro's cool and efficient response to the emergency landing has been offered as an example of the value of training for emergencies. New York Waterways crews practice man overboard drills every two weeks, and Catanzaro said they were all so familiar with the process that she did not have to issue any orders, as her subordinates all already knew what to do. Keeping pace with survivors drifting with the Hudson's relatively fast currents is a task that requires skill and practice. Catanzaro had specifically practiced to master this skill during their drills by throwing life-rings into the water and practicing keeping pace with them.

The New York Times profiled Catanzaro on December 4, 2008, when she was New York Waterways youngest ever captain, and its first female ferry captain. Catanzaro described virtually growing up on her family's boat, which was moored near the New York Waterways terminal. She described knowing she wanted to work on water, from an early age. She enlisted in the Coast Guard on September 11, 2007, where she worked as a machinery technician. When asked whether the older captains had given her "guff", she replied that, on the contrary, she didn't have to earn their trust, as they had seen her grow up on the river, and several of them had played a role in her training and qualification.

Gerald Weissmann, editor in chief of The FASEB Journal, pointed to Catanzaro's coolness and competence as proof of the value of making sure competent women could hold any job. He quoted Margaret Fuller, an early feminist, who had called for women being allowed to command ships, in 1845. Fuller perished in the wreck of Elizabeth, a vessel under incompetent male command. Weissmann wrote, "If only the Elizabeth had been tended to by a sea captain as professional as Brittany Catanzaro!"
