= NY Waterway =

American ferry company

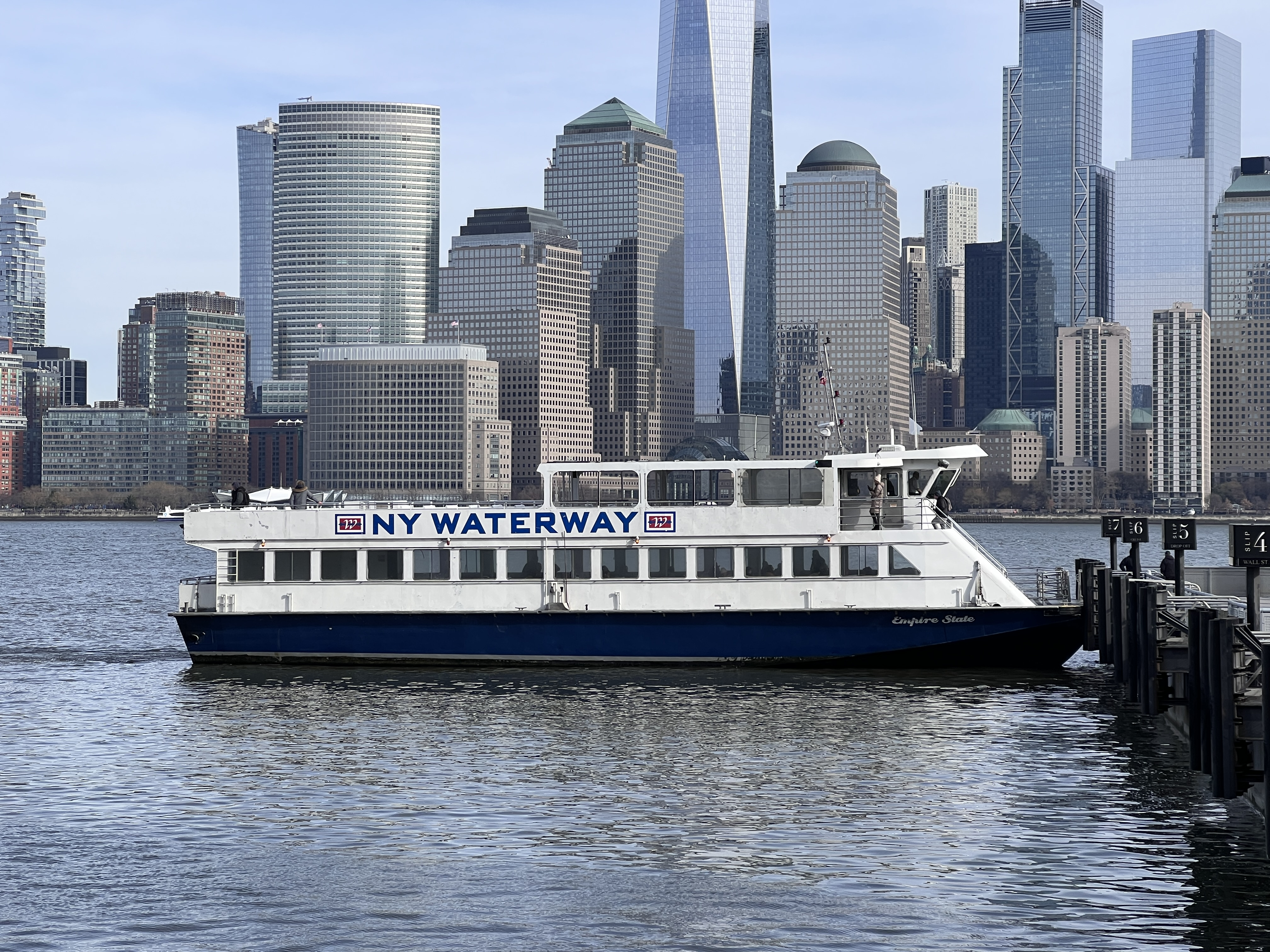
- NY Waterway's Empire State ferry at the Paulus Hook terminal in Jersey City, New Jersey in February 2023
- Locale: New Jersey; New York
- Waterway: Hudson River; East River; New York Bay
- Transit type: Passenger ferry Excursions; Sightseeing
- Owner: Port Imperial Ferry Company
- Began operation: December 3, 1986; 39 years ago
- No. of lines: 23
- No. of vessels: 32
- No. of terminals: 18
- Daily ridership: 18,148 (weekday average, September 2022)
- Website: www.nywaterway.com

NY Waterway, or New York Waterway, is an American private transportation company running ferry and bus service in the Port of New York and New Jersey and in the Hudson Valley. The company utilizes public-private partnership with agencies such as the Port Authority of New York and New Jersey, New Jersey Transit, New York City Department of Transportation, and Metropolitan Transportation Authority to provide service and maintain docking facilities.

NY Waterway uses ferry slips at three terminals in Manhattan and terminals and slips in Jersey City, Hoboken, Weehawken, and Edgewater, all located along the Hudson River Waterfront Walkway, as well as South Amboy in Middlesex County. Commuter peak service is also provided on the Haverstraw–Ossining Ferry, Newburgh–Beacon Ferry, and to the Raritan Bayshore. NY Waterway offers excursion and sightseeing trips to Yankee Stadium, Gateway National Recreation Area, and Governors Island.

The Manhattan to Jersey City route is used as one of the alternatives to the George Washington Bridge for connecting the New York City and New Jersey segments of the East Coast Greenway hiking and biking trail.

As of November 2019, NY Waterway has a total fleet of 32 vessels.

== History ==
=== Founding and early years ===
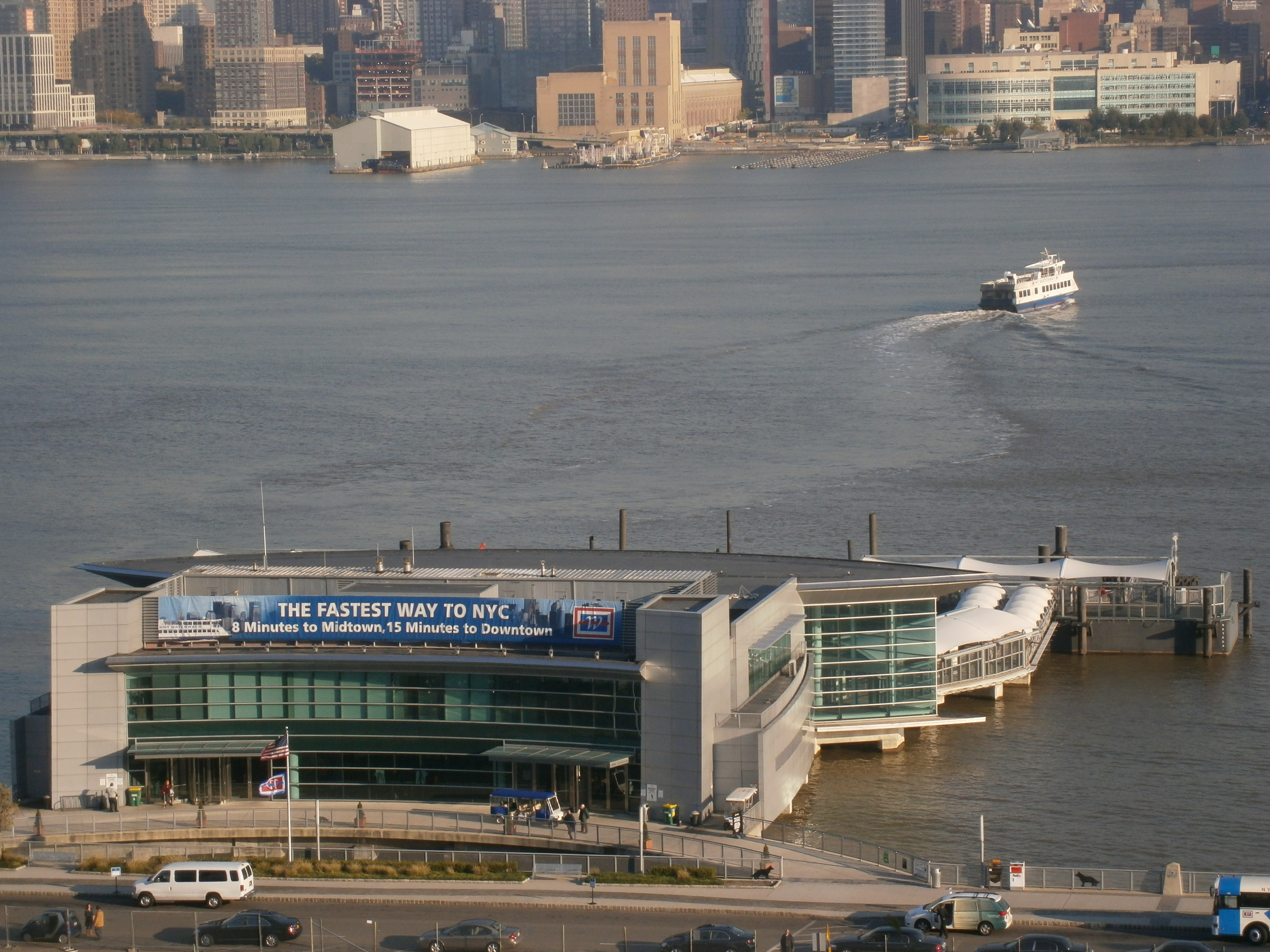
The company's headquarters and terminal in Weehawken, New Jersey

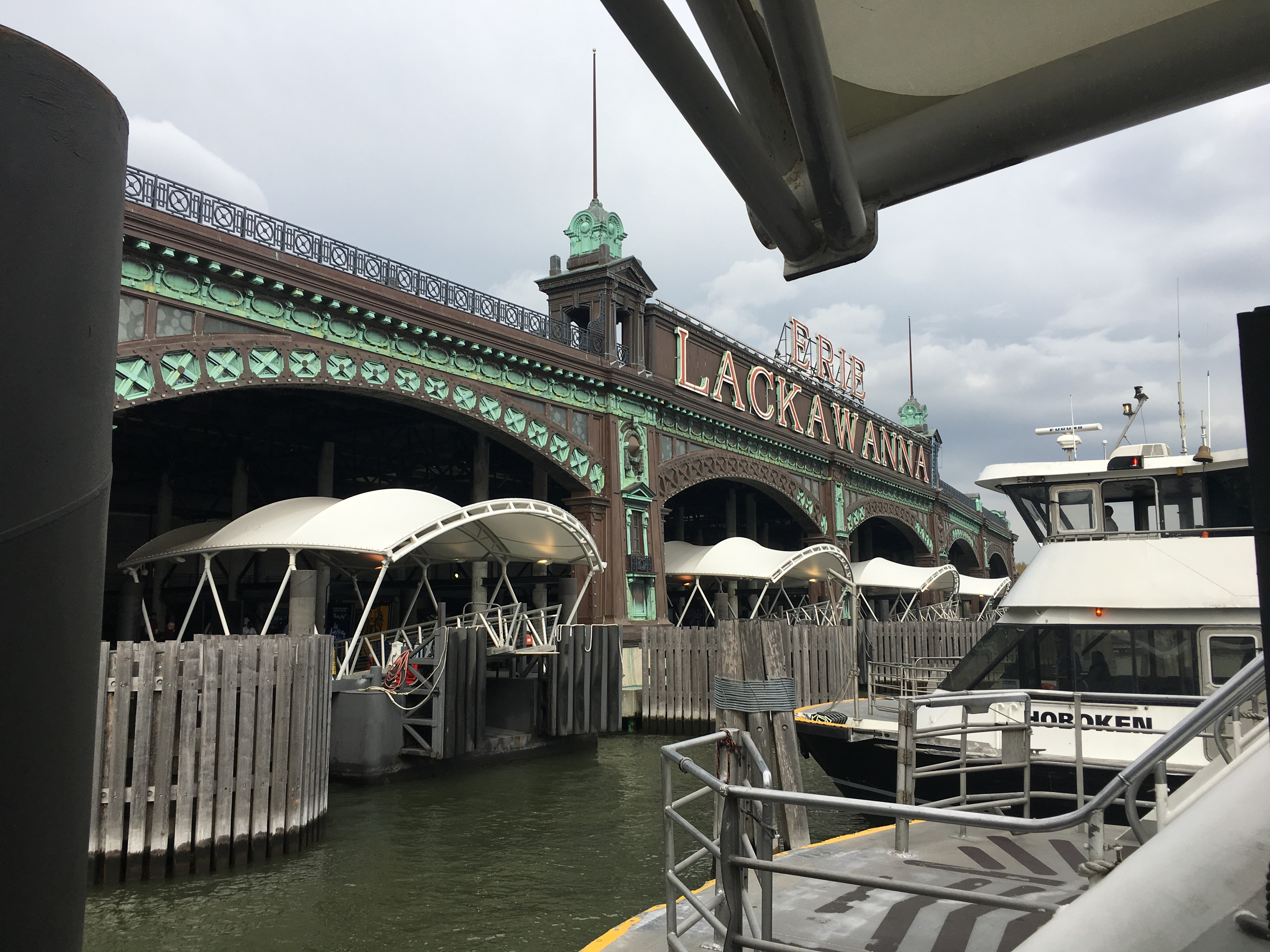
Hoboken Terminal in Hoboken, New Jersey

In 1981, Arthur Edward Imperatore, Sr., a trucking magnate, purchased a 2.5 miles (4.0 km) length of the Weehawken, New Jersey waterfront, where the company is based, from the bankrupt Penn Central for $7.5 million, with the plan to redevelop the brownfield site along the west bank of the Hudson River waterfront and to restore ferry service to it.

In 1986, Imperatore established New York Waterway, with a route across the river between Weehawken Port Imperial and Pier 78 on the West Side of Midtown Manhattan.

Three years later, it began operation between Hoboken Terminal and Battery Park City.

During the course of the next decade numerous routes across the Hudson were added. NY Waterway briefly also operated a high-speed ferry from Staten Island to East 34th Street in 1998, but discontinued it due to low ridership. This marked the first time that NY Waterway discontinued a route.

=== Expansion and near bankruptcy ===
The September 11, 2001 attacks on the World Trade Center destroyed the PATH terminal located there, greatly reducing cross-Hudson River passenger capacity. The company was well-positioned to take advantage of government investment in ferry service, receiving subsidies and generous agreements to docking at public facilities. NY Waterway service quickly expanded by adding new routes and increasing the frequency of crossings, heavily borrowing to fund the acquisition of additional vessels.

After PATH service was restored ridership significantly declined, the loss of passengers brought the company, unable to reduce its fixed costs, to brink of bankruptcy. By December 2004, there was deep concern that there would be a total shutdown of ferry service, disrupting the commutes of 30,000 daily riders. The Port Authority, as well as city and state agencies had already contracted the construction of new ferry terminals to be leased to private operators. The shutdown was averted when the new Billybey Ferry Company, which had never before operated ferry services, founded by Manhattan lawyer William B. Wachtel, agreed to take over almost half of NY Waterway's equipment and routes. The remaining service remained under control of the Port Imperial Ferry Corporation, the legal name of the original organization. Other ferry and sightseeing boat operators were displeased that the Port Authority approved the transfer without a transparent bidding process.

=== East River Ferry ===
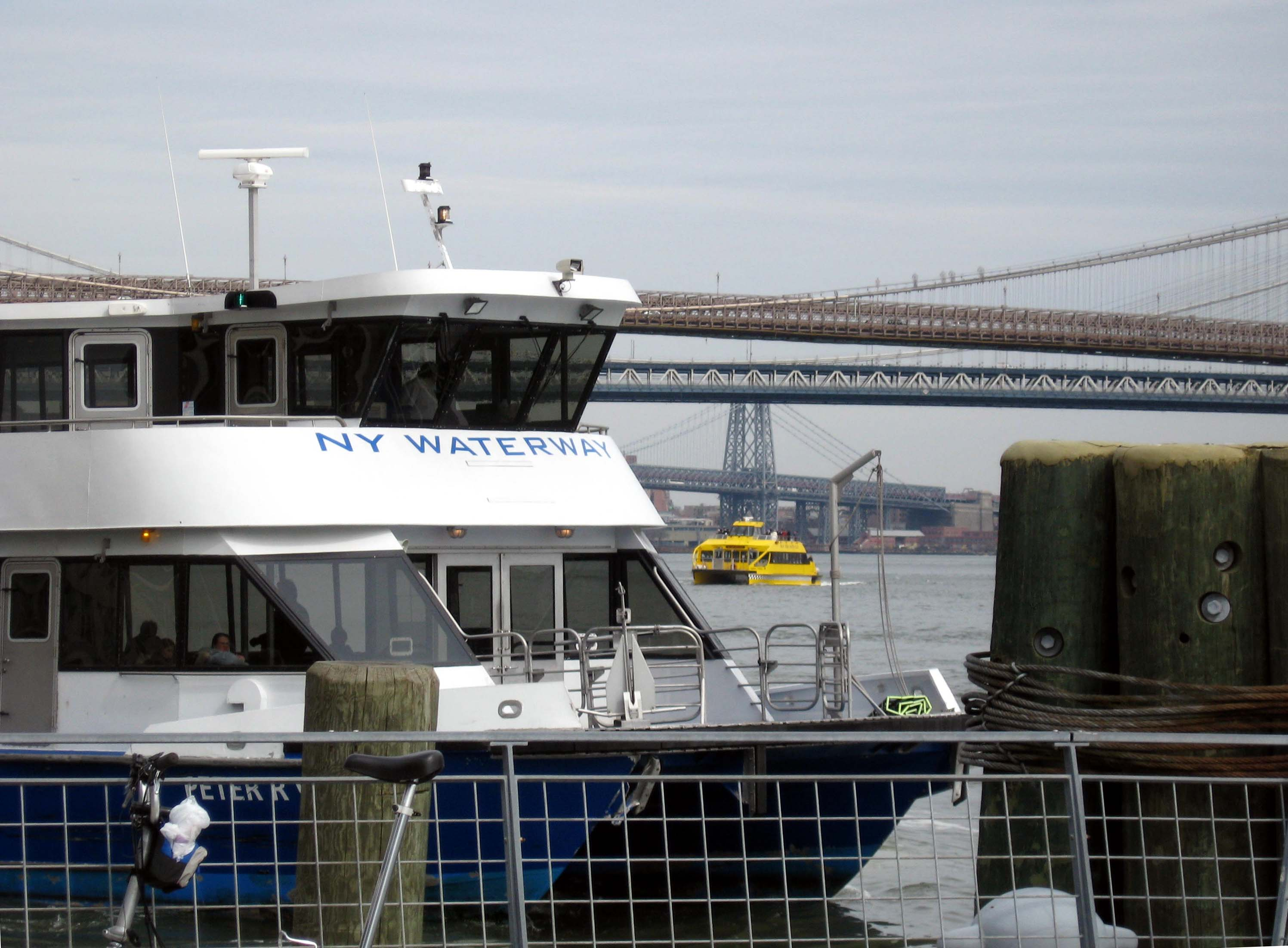
Pier 11/Wall Street on the East River

In February 2011, NY Waterway was contracted to operate a route calling at slips in Brooklyn and Queens as well as the East River terminals, replacing an earlier peak-only service operated by New York Water Taxi. In June 2011, the NY Waterway-operated East River Ferry line started operations. The route was a 7-stop East River service that ran between East 34th Street and Pier 11, making one intermediate stop in Queens and four in Brooklyn. The fare was $4 per one-way ticket.

Subsidized by the City of New York, the service was originally intended for commuters, but after a few months became popular with weekend users and tourists. It was used by two to six times the number of passengers that the city predicted would ride the ferries. From June to November 2011, the ferry accommodated 2,862 riders on an average weekday, as opposed to a projection of 1,488 riders, and it had 4,500 riders on an average weekend, six times the city's projected ridership; in total, the ferry saw 350,000 riders in that period, over 250% of the initial ridership forecast of 134,000 riders. The route was merged into NYC Ferry on May 1, 2017, coming under the operation of Hornblower Cruises.

In December 2016, the company announced it would reacquire Billybey Ferry and merge ownership back under a single roof.

=== 2023 FTA grant ===
In 2023, the state of New Jersey received an $11.3 million grant from the Federal Transit Administration for ferries in the state. As a part of this grant, NY Waterway was given $7.298 million to convert four ferries from diesel to hybrid power.

=== Rescue operations ===
==== September 11 attacks ====
NY Waterway has played a role in a number of rescue and emergency operations. In the immediate aftermath of collapse of the World Trade Center, the company played a major role in the maritime response following the September 11 attacks and the evacuation of passengers who otherwise would have been stranded because of the chaos in the regional transportation network. It is estimated that NY Waterway transported over 150,000 people. The Hudson Riverfront 9/11 Memorial is located near the NY Waterway terminal.

==== Northeast blackout of 2003 ====
The ferry service also brought people across the river during Northeast Blackout of 2003 when service on New Jersey Transit and Port Authority Trans-Hudson trains could not operate. During the 2005 New York City transit strike it provided alternative transportation.

==== US Airways Flight 1549 ====
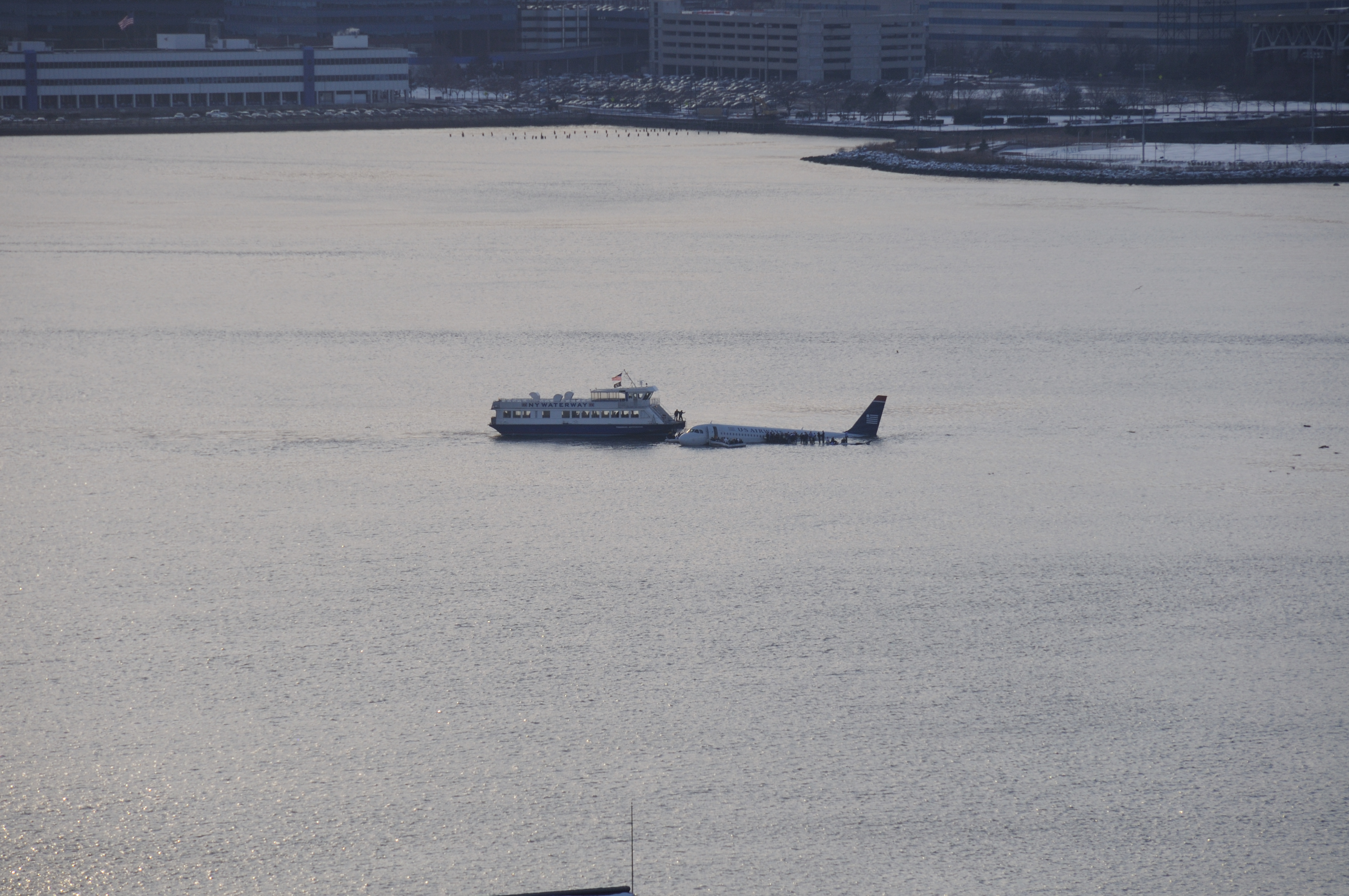
Coming to the aid of downed Flight 1549

In January 2009, the company was instrumental in the rescue of passengers of US Airways Flight 1549, which made an emergency landing on the Hudson River after both of its engines failed. The firm gained media attention both for its efforts to rescue passengers from airplane and for its hiring of 19-year-old Brittany Catanzaro as captain. Thanks in part to the successful efforts of Captains Vincent Lombardi and Catanzaro, together with their crews, all aboard were rescued.

==== Katherine G ====
On April 6, 2012, a NY Waterway ferry rescued the crew of the Katherine G, a tugboat that capsized near Liberty Island. The ferry's captain, Mohamed Gouda, had also commanded one of the ferries that participated in the flight 1549 rescue.

== Controversies ==
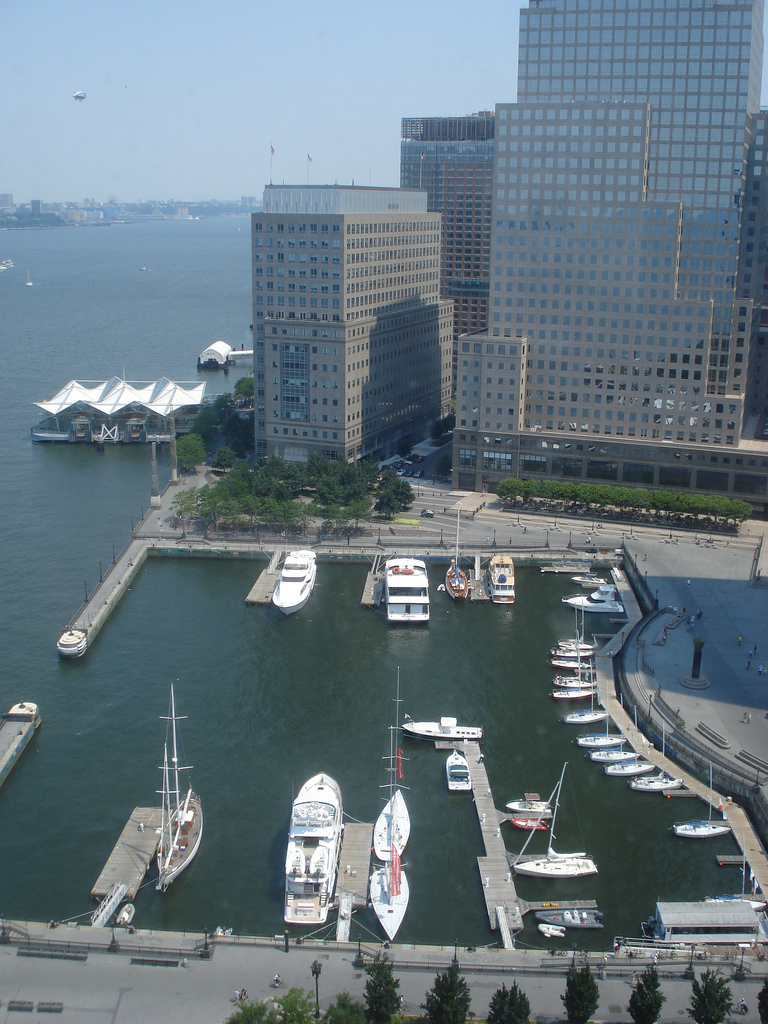
Battery Park City Ferry Terminal (on left) is moored in the Hudson River just north of World Financial Center North Cove

=== 9/11 fraud settlement ===
In 2003, the U.S. federal government began investigating NY Waterways in allegations that the company defrauded the federal government after the September 11 attacks. In July 2006 NY Waterway agreed to pay $1.2 million to settle civil fraud charges brought by the United States in connection with payments made by the government to NY Waterway for ferry service after the September 11, 2001 attacks. The Government alleged in its complaint that NY Waterway inflated its incremental costs, overstated its ferry service profit margin, and submitted false bills to the Port Authority to gain reimbursement for charter boat expenses that NY waterway, in fact, did not incur.

=== Homeport controversy ===
The "home port" for maintenance and refueling has long been located at Port Imperial. NY Waterway sold the upland property and in November 2017 purchased the former Union Dry Dock 8-acre (3.2 ha) site in Hoboken to build a new facility. The city and the company are embroiled in a dispute over its construction. The city has refused to grant permission to allow the project to proceed saying that it prevents completion of the a contiguous waterfront walkway. A plan for NJ Transit to purchase the property and lease it to NY Waterway was withdrawn after intervention by Governor Phil Murphy NY Waterway is suing the city to allow it to continue with construction. NY Waterway and city reached a deal in which the ferry company would sell the land to the municipality for about $18.5 million, but the sale as of November 2022 had not been finalized.

It was then suggested the homeport in Weehawken would instead be expanded. In January 2022, the Weehawken municipal government passed a resolution opposing the expansion of what has long been a temporary facility. The property in Hoboken again become controversial with proposals to acquire it via eminent domain. In February 2023 the city signed 5-year lease with NY Waterway to continue using the property. It has made applications to improve the site.

=== Safety issues ===
On November 24, 2019, the U.S. Coast Guard pulled 23 ferries out of the company's 32-vessel fleet due to safety issues following a routine annual inspection. Customers experienced delays the following day, but all but one vessel had resumed service by the evening of November 25.

=== Alleged Clean Water Act violations ===
Two former employees alleged in November 2020 that the company ordered employees to dump untreated sewage into the Hudson.

== NJ Transit fare-sharing ==
In June 2012, New Jersey Transit and NY Waterway began a fare-sharing program for riders transferring between the Hudson-Bergen Light Rail and ferries at Port Imperial for ten-trip and monthly tickets. in a program called Surf and Turf In May 2013, NY Waterway initiated afternoon bus service along the NJT bus routes 158 and 159R, which travel north to Fort Lee, and 156R, with continuing service to Englewood Cliffs. Passengers who purchase a 10-trip or a Monthly Joint Bus-Ferry pass take the bus to the Port Authority Bus Terminal during mornings and travel by ferry in the evening.

In December 2014, it was announced that NJT will buy ten buses for NY Waterway's use on its Manhattan bus routes. In January 2016, NY Waterway and NJT introduced the Hudson GoPass, allowing for unlimited use on light rail, ferry and bus routes 156, 158, 159. NJ Transit has also provided funding for boat maintenance and bus purchases.

== Routes and terminals ==
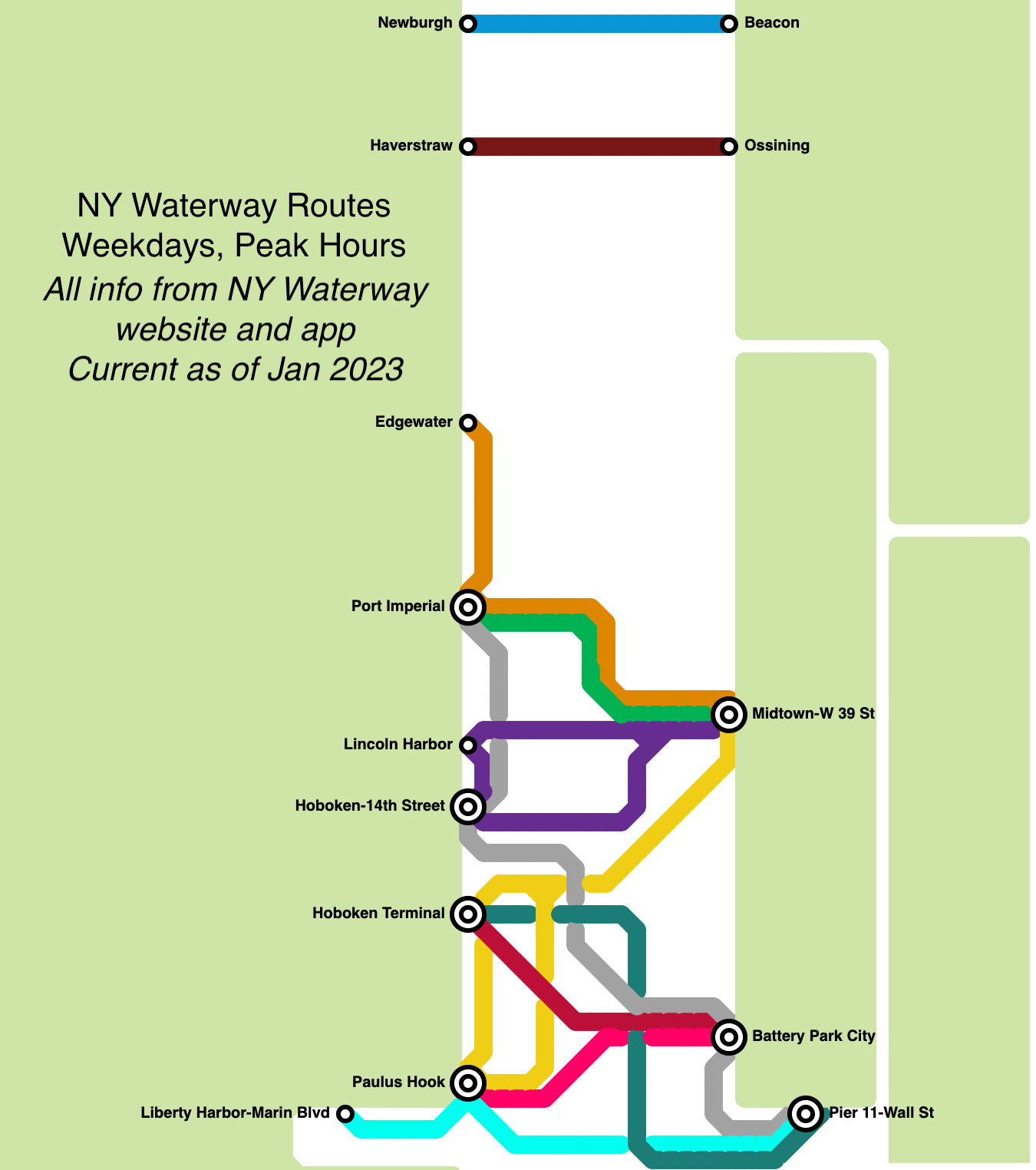
Weekday peak hour routes

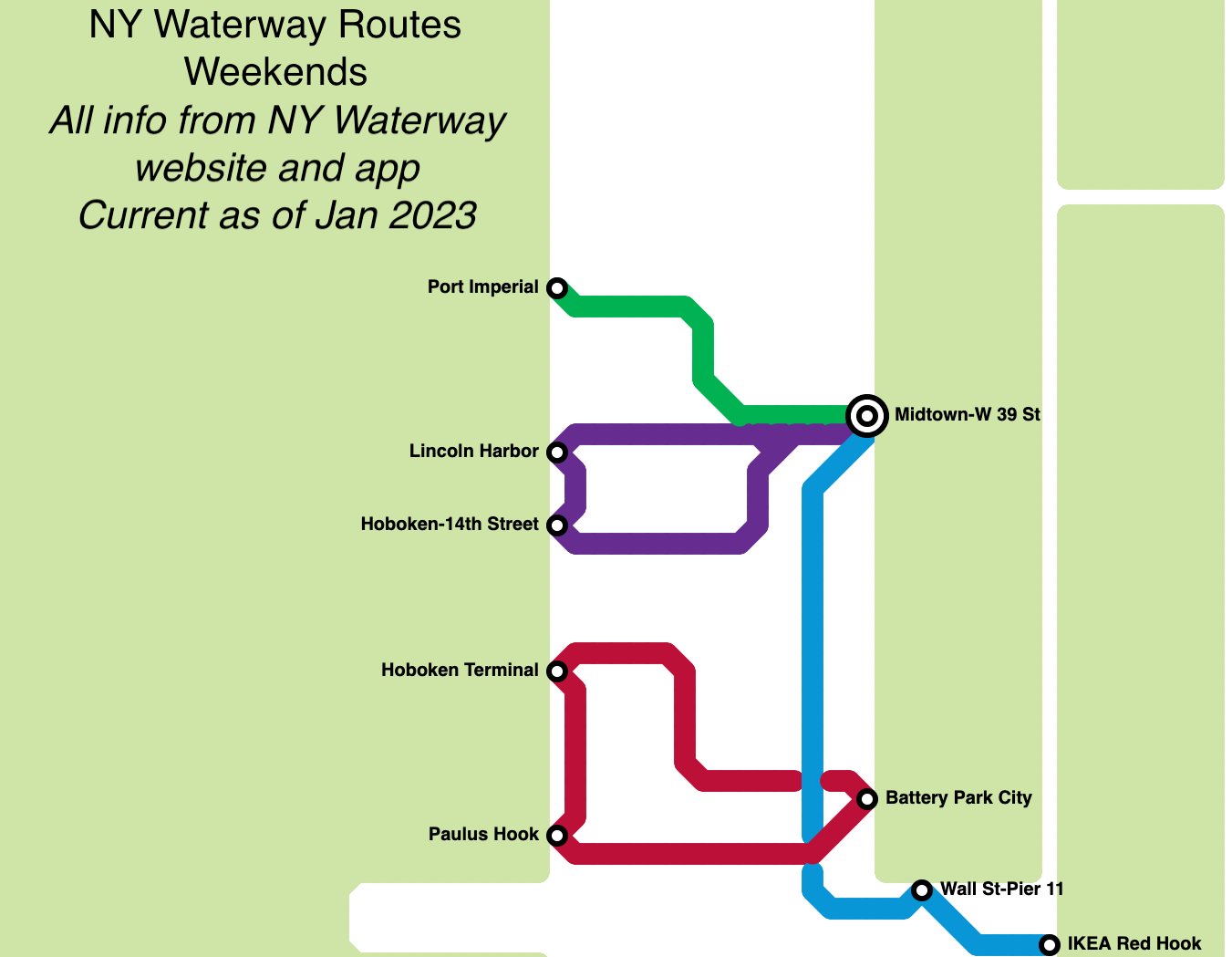
Weekend routes

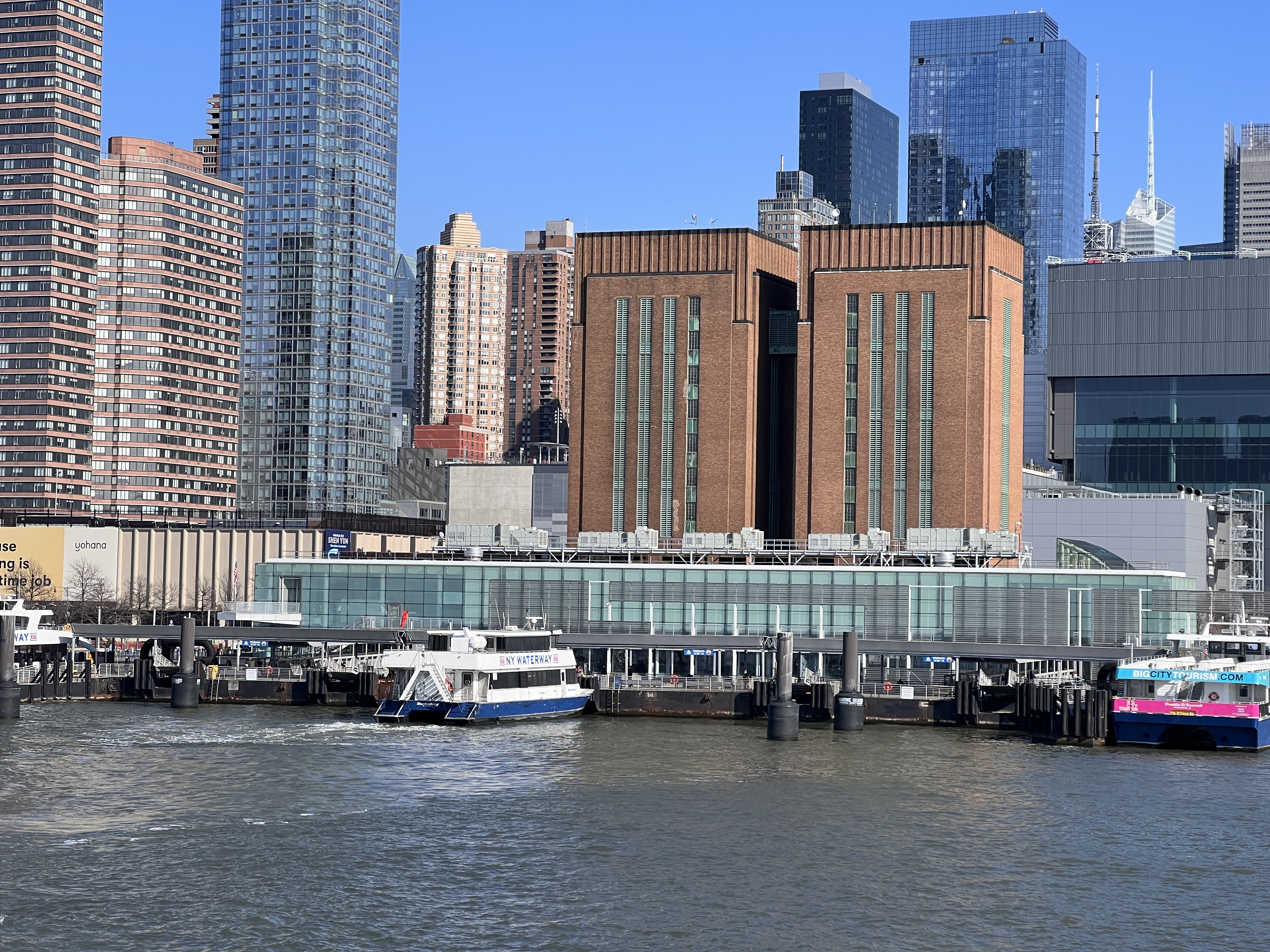
West Midtown Ferry Terminal

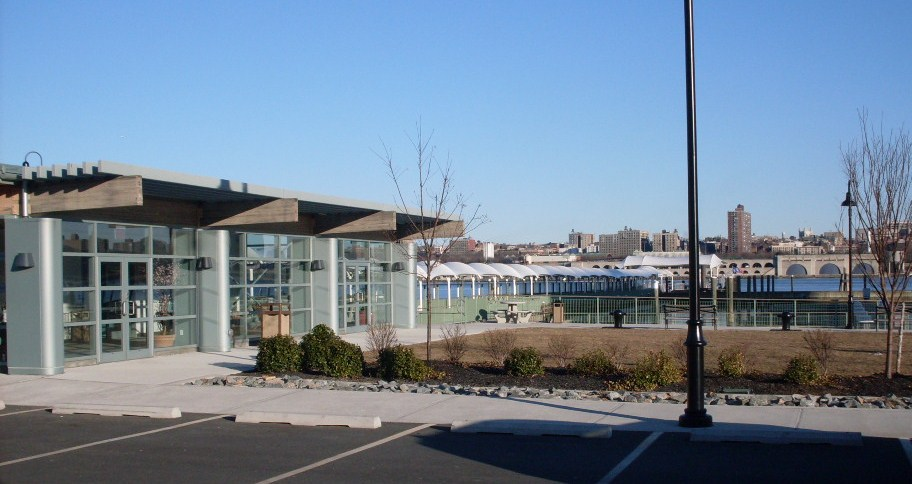
Edgewater Landing

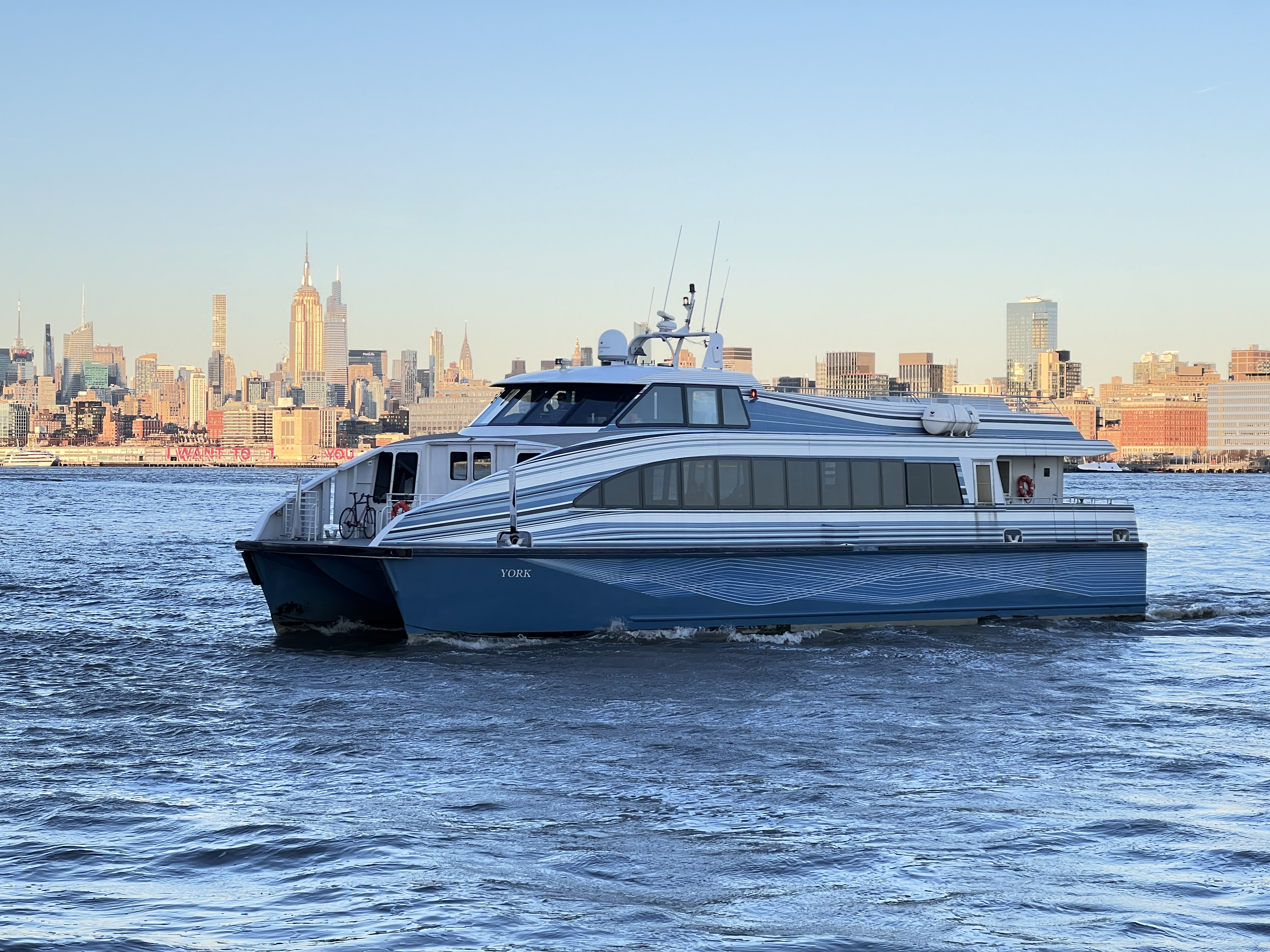
A Goldman Sachs-owned ferry at Paulus Hook Ferry Terminal

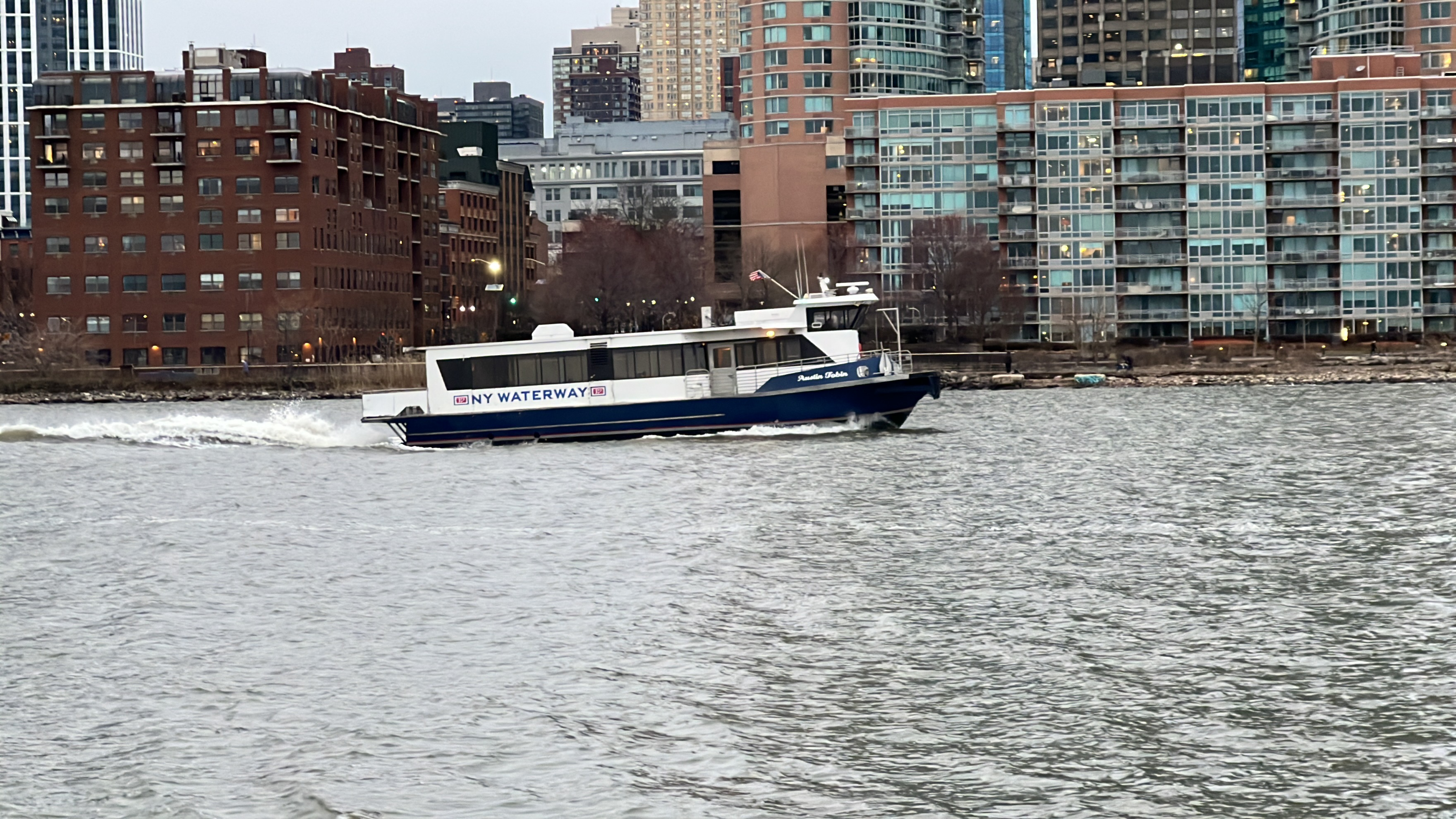
A ferry on the Liberty Harbor route crossing the Morris Canal

=== New Jersey—Manhattan services ===
Manhattan services originate across six localities in New Jersey: Edgewater in Bergen County, Weehawken, Hoboken, and Jersey City in Hudson County, South Amboy in Middlesex County, and Belford in Monmouth County. These localities are listed below from north to south.

Terminals				Year begun	Notes
Edgewater	Edgewater Ferry Landing	↔	Midtown / West 39th Street; Pier 79, Midtown	2006	Weekday peak service only; Intermediate stop in the peak direction at Port Imperial.
Weehawken	Port Imperial	↔	Midtown / West 39th Street; Pier 79, Midtown	1986	
Weehawken	Port Imperial	↔	Pier 11 / Wall Street; Financial District	2000	Weekday peak service only; Intermediate stops at Hoboken 14th Street and Brookfield Place
Weehawken	Lincoln Harbor and 14th Street	↔	Midtown / West 39th Street; Pier 79, Midtown	1989 (Lincoln Harbor)	
Hoboken	Lincoln Harbor and 14th Street	↔	Midtown / West 39th Street; Pier 79, Midtown	2001 (14th Street)	
Hoboken	Hoboken Terminal	↔	Brookfield Place; Battery Park City	1989	Weekend service has an intermediate stop at Paulus Hook
Hoboken	Hoboken Terminal	↔	Pier 11 / Wall Street; Financial District	2001	Weekday peak service only
Hoboken	Hoboken Terminal and Paulus Hook	↔	Midtown / West 39th Street; Pier 79, Midtown	2017 (Hoboken Terminal)	
Jersey City	Hoboken Terminal and Paulus Hook	↔	Midtown / West 39th Street; Pier 79, Midtown	2001 (Paulus Hook)	
Jersey City	Paulus Hook; Exchange Place	↔	Brookfield Place; Battery Park City	1994	Weekend service has an intermediate stop at Hoboken Terminal; Weekday service operated using Goldman Sachs-owned catamarans.
Jersey City	Liberty Harbor; Marin Boulevard	↔	Pier 11 / Wall Street; Financial District	2001	Weekday peak service only, with an intermediate stop at Paulus Hook
Jersey City	Port Liberté		Pier 11 / Wall Street; Financial District	1996	Weekday peak service only; Service operated from 1996 to 2020, then was suspended from March 2020 to July 2023. Service resumed in July 2023.
South Amboy	South Amboy Terminal		Midtown / West 39th Street; Pier 79, Midtown	2023	Weekday peak service only; Permanent terminal under construction, will open 2025.; Intermediate stop at Brookfield Place
Belford	Belford/Harbor Way Ferry Terminal		Midtown / West 39th Street; Pier 79, Midtown	2002	Intermediate stop at Brookfield Place and Paulus Hook; Service operated from 2002 to 2022, then was suspended from December 2022 to September 2026. Service resumed in September 2026.

=== Intra-NYC services ===
Terminals			Year begun	Notes
Red Hook/IKEA; Erie Basin	↔	Midtown / West 39th Street; Pier 79, Midtown	2021	Weekend service only; Formerly operated by New York Water Taxi; Intermediate stop at Pier 11/Wall Street; Dropoff only at Pier 11 going northbound only; Southbound trips pickup and dropoff at Pier 11.

=== Upstream Hudson services ===
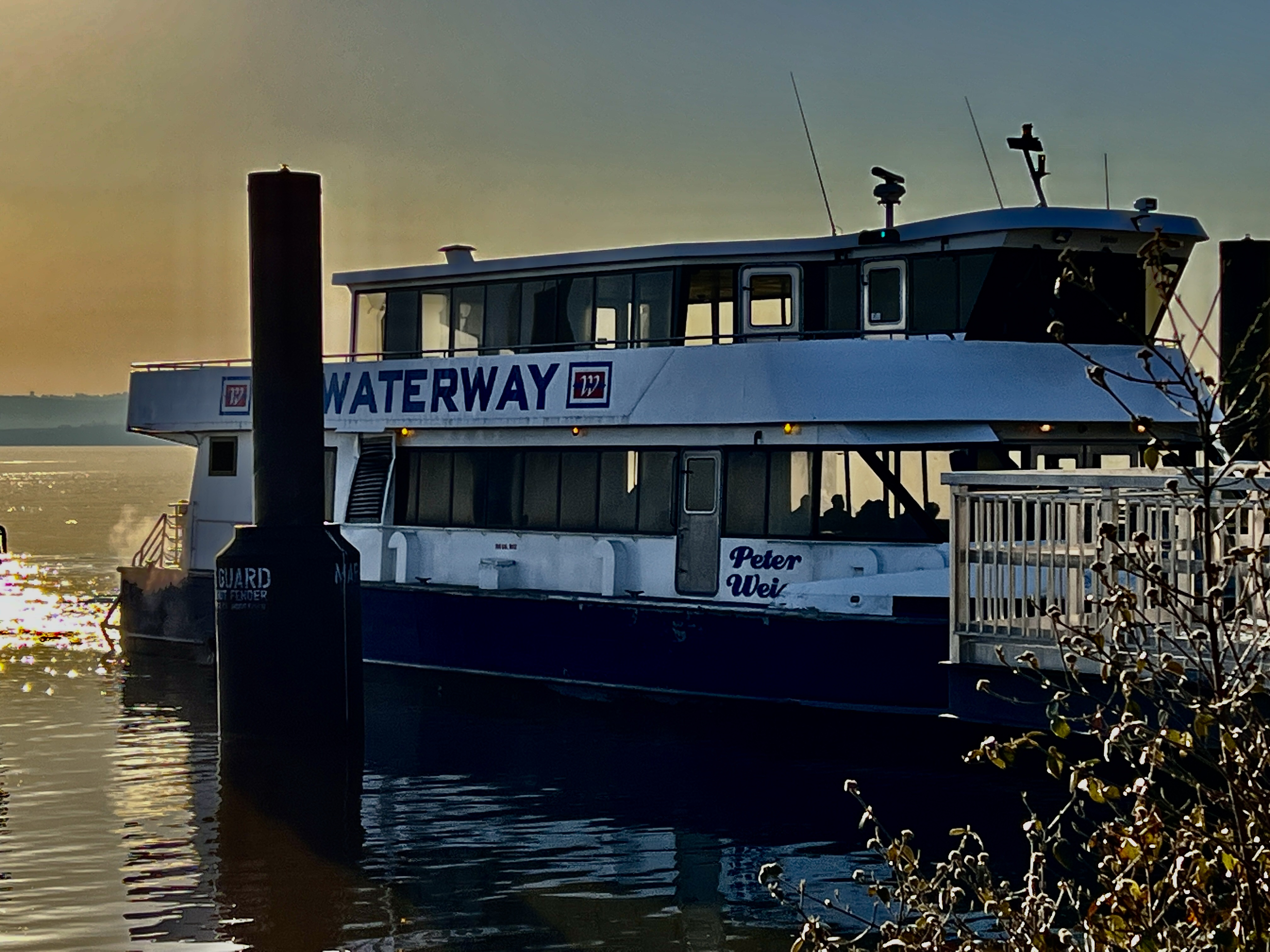
The Haverstraw–Ossining Ferry at the Haverstraw dock

Terminals			Year begun	Notes
Haverstraw	↔	Ossining; Metro-North station	2000	Weekday peak service only
Newburgh (discontinued in 2025)	↔	Beacon; Metro-North station	2005	Weekday peak service only

The Haverstraw–Ossining Ferry connects Haverstraw in Rockland County with Ossining in Westchester County. The Ossining terminal is located adjacent to Ossining station, which is served by Metro-North's Hudson Line. The Newburgh–Beacon Ferry connects Newburgh in Orange County with Beacon in Dutchess County. The Beacon terminal is located adjacent to Beacon station, also served by the Hudson Line. The ferry was suspended and replaced with buses in January 2025, and the MTA announced in July 2025 that service would be discontinued. Extra bus service (the new Newburgh-Beacon Bridge Shuttle bus service) has replaced the ferry starting January 2, 2026. Both ferries are operated under a contract from the Metropolitan Transportation Authority.

=== Manhattan connecting buses ===
NY Waterway operates connecting bus service for ferry passengers on different routes in Manhattan.

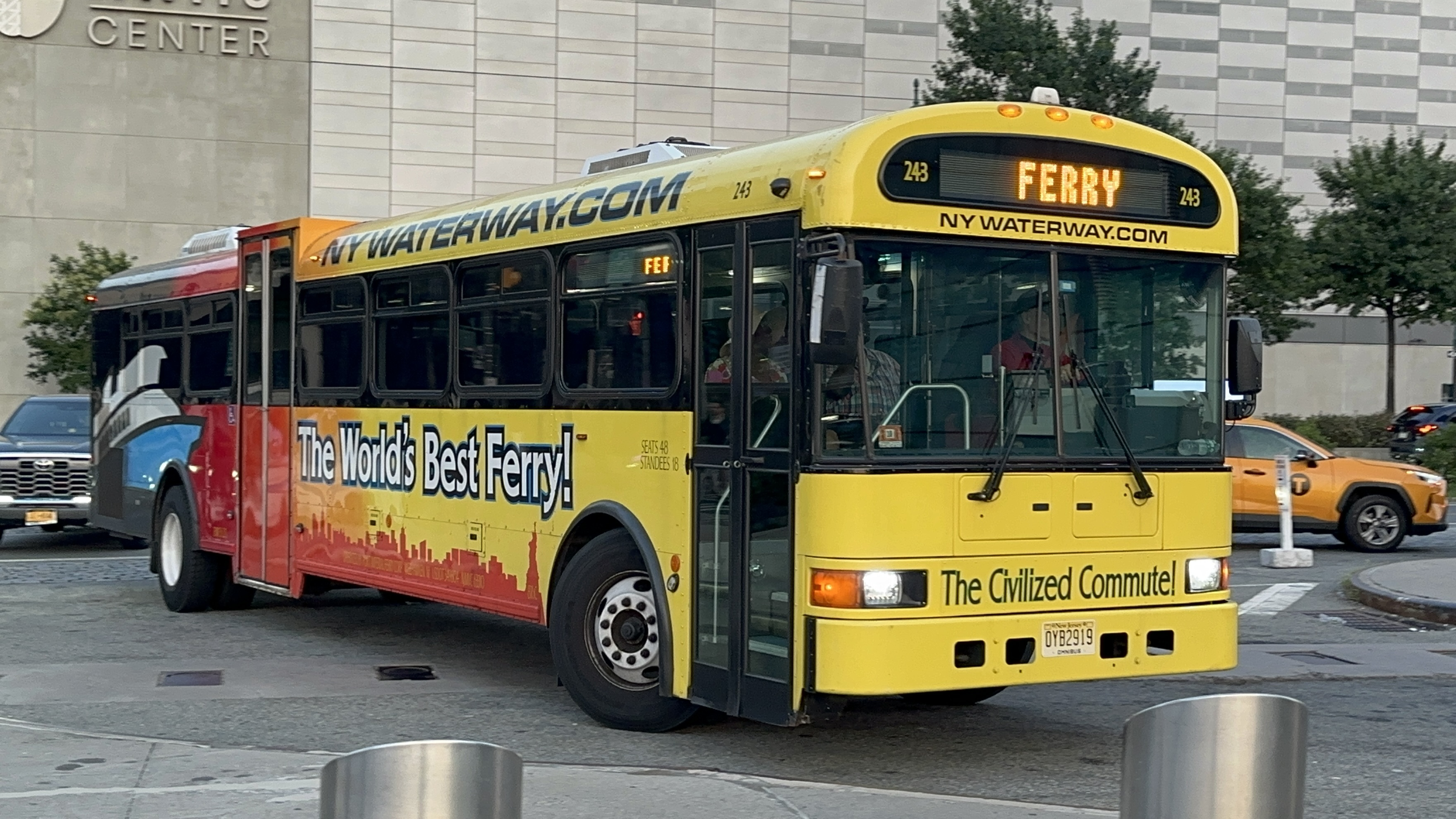
NY Waterway 243 pulling in to the Manhattan terminal.

=== Discontinued services ===
At various points in the past, NY Waterway has also provided ferry service to other destinations including LaGuardia Airport, Newport, Harborside, Liberty State Park, Belford, Sandy Hook, and Belmar, New Jersey. Ferry services for Belford, Sandy Hook, Atlantic Highlands, and Highlands along the Raritan Bayshore in Monmouth County, New Jersey were given to Seastreak.

== See also ==
- Circle Line Sightseeing
- Liberty Landing Ferry
- Staten Island Ferry
- List of ferries across the Hudson River to New York City
- List of ferries across the East River
