= List of Metro-North Railroad stations =

The Metro-North Railroad is a commuter rail system serving two of the five boroughs of New York City (Manhattan and the Bronx), Westchester, Putnam, Dutchess, Rockland, and Orange Counties in New York, as well Fairfield and New Haven Counties in Connecticut. It was established by the Metropolitan Transportation Authority in 1983 to acquire operation of all commuter rail service in New York and Connecticut from Conrail, which itself had been formed in 1976 through the merging of a number of financially troubled railroads, and previously operated commuter railroad service under contract from the MTA.

== Station origins ==
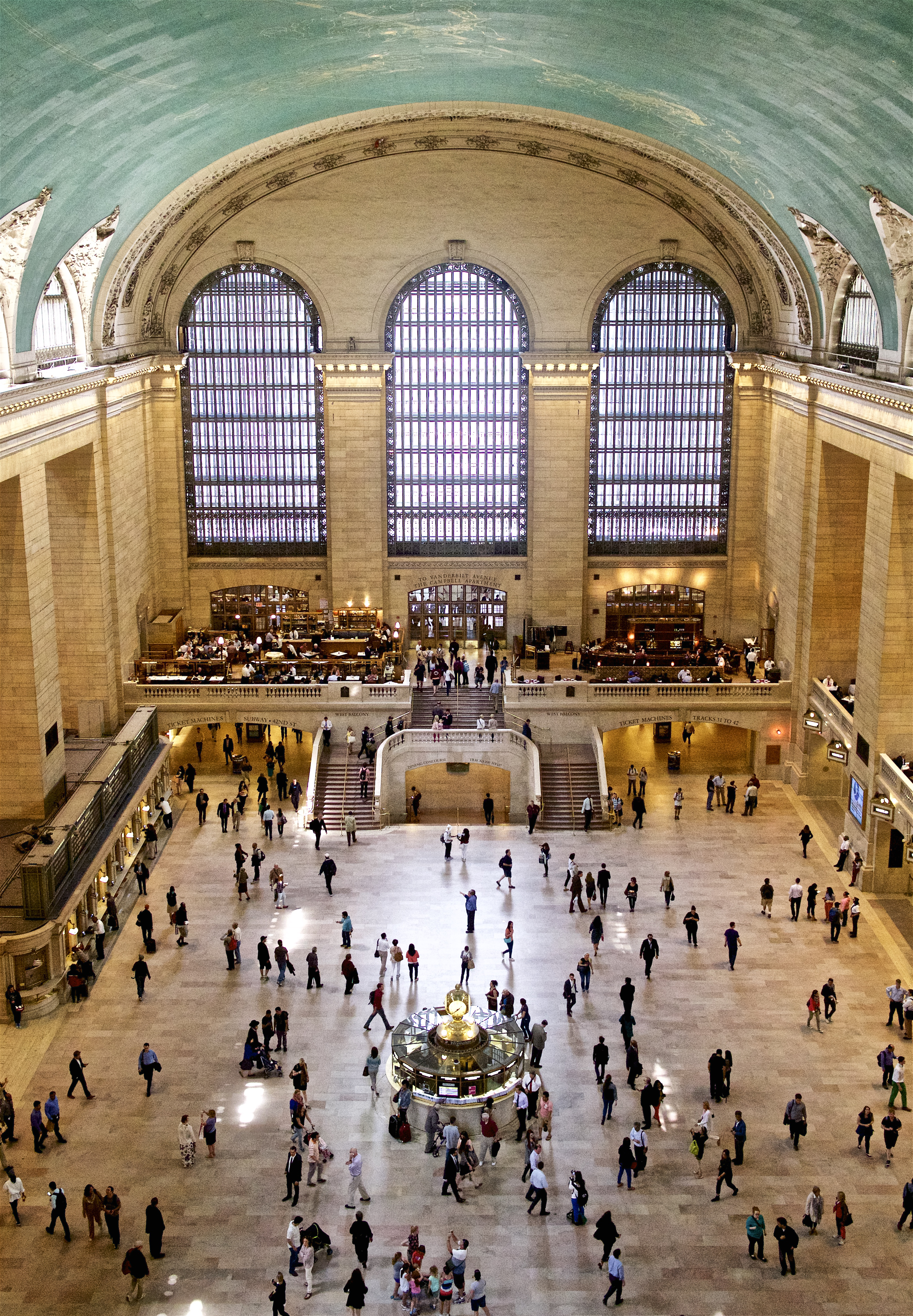
The main concourse of Grand Central Terminal, a National Historic Landmark and New York City Landmark.

As with many commuter railroad systems of the late-20th Century in the United States, the stations exist along lines that were inherited from other railroads of the 19th and early 20th Centuries. Stations on the east side of the Hudson River were originally part of either New York Central Railroad or New York, New Haven and Hartford Railroad, both of which became part of Penn Central in 1968 and 1969 respectively. Stations on lines on the west side of the Hudson River were originally part of Erie Railroad, which was merged into the Erie Lackawanna Railroad in 1960.

== Historical preservation of stations ==
Dozens of active stations that serve Metro-North are listed on the National Register of Historic Places, the most notable of which is Grand Central Terminal, which is also a National Historic Landmark and a New York City Landmark. The majority of protected stations are on the New Haven Line, including two of the three branches. Four of the northern termini of each line contains stations that are on NRHP, but the only one that serves Metro-North trains is Poughkeepsie station. The New Haven Line has been terminating northeast of the historic New Haven Union Station at State Street station since 2002. The Danbury Branch, Waterbury Branch, and Port Jervis Line stop at platforms just short of former stations that are listed on NRHP.

Some stations, such as Cannondale, are contributing properties to historic districts on NRHP. Other structures related to the railroad are listed on NRHP, but are not stations, such as the Housatonic River, Norwalk River, and Saugatuck River Railroad Bridges.

== Station list ==
This is a list of train stations served by Metro-North Railroad. This includes stations shared with NJ Transit, but only those within New York State. Stations are listed in alphabetical order. Stations along the Pascack Valley Line from Hoboken, NJ to Montvale, NJ and along the Main Line and Bergen County Line from Hoboken, NJ to Mahwah, NJ are operated solely by NJ Transit.

Disabled access	Station is accessible by wheelchair
‡	Station meets all ADA accessibility requirements

Station	Line	Municipality	County	Former railroad	Disabled access	Opened	Notes
Ansonia	Waterbury Branch	Ansonia	New Haven, CT	New Haven			
Appalachian Trail	Harlem Line	Pawling	Dutchess, NY	New York Central		April 1, 1990	Built by Metro-North
Ardsley-on-Hudson	Hudson Line	Irvington	Westchester, NY	New York Central	‡	Circa 1896	
Beacon	Hudson Line	Beacon	Dutchess, NY	New York Central and New Haven		1915	Replaced Fishkill Landing station, originally built by the Hudson River Railroad; Also served the ND&C (later CNE, then New Haven Railroads)
Beacon Falls	Waterbury Branch	Beacon Falls	New Haven, CT	New Haven			
Bedford Hills	Harlem Line	Bedford Hills	Westchester, NY	New York Central		1847	
Bethel	Danbury Branch	Bethel	Fairfield, CT	New Haven	‡	1996	Replaced 1899-built NYNH&H Depot
Botanical Garden	Harlem Line	Bedford Park	The Bronx, NY	New York Central	‡	Circa 1890s	
Branchville	Danbury Branch	Ridgefield	Fairfield, CT	New Haven		1905	
Breakneck Ridge	Hudson Line	Town of Fishkill	Putnam, NY	New York Central			
Brewster	Harlem Line	Brewster	Putnam, NY	New York Central	‡	1848	Rebuilt in 1931; Also served Putnam Branch until 1959
Bridgeport	New Haven Line; Waterbury Branch	Bridgeport	Fairfield, CT	New Haven	‡	1905	Rebuilt in 1975 by Penn Central; Also serves Amtrak's Northeast Regional and Vermonter trains
Bronxville	Harlem Line	Bronxville	Westchester, NY	New York Central		1916	
Campbell Hall	Port Jervis Line	Town of Hamptonburgh	Orange, NY	Erie		April 18, 1983	Also served the Wallkill Valley Railroad
Cannondale	Danbury Branch	Cannondale	Fairfield, CT	New Haven (D&N)		1892	Contributing property of the Cannondale Historic District
Chappaqua	Harlem Line	Chappaqua	Westchester, NY	New York Central		1902	Replaced 1846-built NY&H Depot. Current station and plaza have been on NRHP since 1979
Cold Spring	Hudson Line	Cold Spring	Putnam, NY	New York Central			
Cortlandt	Hudson Line	Cortlandt Manor	Westchester, NY	New York Central	‡	June 30, 1996	Built by Metro-North; Replaced both Montrose and Crugers Stations
Cos Cob	New Haven Line	Cos Cob	Fairfield, CT	New Haven		1894	Replaced 1848-built NY&NH Depot
Crestwood	Harlem Line	Tuckahoe	Westchester, NY	New York Central		1901	
Croton Falls	Harlem Line	Croton Falls	Westchester, NY	New York Central		1847	Rebuilt by Metro-North
Croton–Harmon	Hudson Line	Croton-on-Hudson	Westchester, NY	New York Central	‡		Also serves Amtrak's Adirondack, Berkshire Flyer, Empire Service, Ethan Allen Express, Lake Shore Limited, and Maple Leaf trains.
Danbury	Danbury Branch	Danbury	Fairfield, CT	New Haven	‡	1996	Replaced former Danbury Union Station.
Darien	New Haven Line; Danbury Branch	Darien	Fairfield, CT	New Haven	‡	Circa 1890s	
Derby–Shelton	Waterbury Branch	Derby	New Haven, CT	New Haven	Disabled access		
Dobbs Ferry	Hudson Line	Dobbs Ferry	Westchester, NY	New York Central	‡	Circa 1851	
Dover Plains	Harlem Line	Dover Plains	Dutchess, NY	New York Central	‡	December 1, 1848	
East Norwalk	New Haven Line	East Norwalk	Fairfield, CT	New Haven			
Fairfield	New Haven Line	Fairfield	Fairfield, CT	New Haven	‡	1882	
Fairfield–Black Rock	New Haven Line	Fairfield	Fairfield, CT	New Haven	‡	December 5, 2011	Built by Metro-North and CDOT
Fleetwood	Harlem Line	Mount Vernon	Westchester, NY	New York Central	Disabled access	1924	
Fordham	Harlem Line; New Haven Line	Fordham Plaza	The Bronx, NY	New York Central	‡	1841	Shared with New Haven Railroad since 1924.
Garrison	Hudson Line	Garrison	Putnam, NY	New York Central		1892	
Glenbrook	New Canaan Branch	Stamford	Fairfield, CT	New Haven		Circa 1868	
Glenwood	Hudson Line	Yonkers	Westchester, NY	New York Central	‡		
Goldens Bridge	Harlem Line	Goldens Bridge	Westchester, NY	New York Central	Disabled access		
Grand Central Terminal	Hudson Line; Harlem Line; New Haven Line; New Canaan Branch; Danbury Branch	Midtown Manhattan	New York, NY	New York Central and New Haven	‡	February 2, 1913	
Green's Farms	New Haven Line	Westport	Fairfield, CT	New Haven	Disabled access		
Greenwich	New Haven Line	Greenwich	Fairfield, CT	New Haven	‡		
Greystone	Hudson Line	Yonkers	Westchester, NY	New York Central	‡	1899	
Harlem Valley–Wingdale	Harlem Line	Wingdale	Dutchess, NY	New York Central	‡	October 30, 1977	Merging of former "State Hospital" and "Wingdale" NYC Stations
Harlem–125th Street	Hudson Line; Harlem Line; New Haven Line; New Canaan Branch; Danbury Branch	Harlem	New York, NY	New York Central and New Haven	‡	1896	
Harriman	Port Jervis Line	Harriman	Orange, NY	Erie	‡	1983	Built by Metro-North; Replaced former Erie Depot
Harrison	New Haven Line	Harrison	Westchester, NY	New Haven	Disabled access	c. 1840	
Hartsdale	Harlem Line	Hartsdale	Westchester, NY	New York Central	Disabled access	1915	Replaced former NY&H Depot; Listed on the National Register of Historic Places
Hastings-on-Hudson	Hudson Line	Hastings-on-Hudson	Westchester, NY	New York Central	‡	1910	Replaced former Hudson River Railroad depot
Hawthorne	Harlem Line	Hawthorne	Westchester, NY	New York Central	Disabled access	1847	
Highbridge Facility	Hudson Line	Highbridge	The Bronx, NY	New York Central			Converted to a maintenance facility by Penn Central during the 1970s.
Irvington	Hudson Line	Irvington	Westchester, NY	New York Central			
Katonah	Harlem Line	Katonah	Westchester, NY	New York Central	Disabled access	1897	Rebuilt by Metro-North in 1984; Also served Lake Mahopac Branch until 1959
Larchmont	New Haven Line	Larchmont	Westchester, NY	New Haven	‡		
Ludlow	Hudson Line	Yonkers	Westchester, NY	New York Central	Disabled access		Built for former Domino Sugar refinery in Ludlow Park
Mamaroneck	New Haven Line	Mamaroneck	Westchester, NY	New Haven		1888	
Manitou	Hudson Line	Manitou	Putnam, NY	New York Central			
Marble Hill	Hudson Line	Marble Hill	New York, NY	New York Central			
Melrose	Harlem Line	Melrose	The Bronx, NY	New York Central			
Merritt 7	Danbury Branch	Norwalk	Fairfield, CT	New Haven	Disabled access	July 29, 1985	Built by Metro-North
Middletown–Town of Wallkill	Port Jervis Line	Middletown/Wallkill	Orange, NY	Erie	Disabled access	April 18, 1983	Built by Metro-North; Replacement for former Erie Depot
Milford	New Haven Line	Milford	New Haven, CT	New Haven			
Morris Heights	Hudson Line	Morris Heights	The Bronx, NY	New York Central	‡		Also served Putnam Line until 1958
Mount Kisco	Harlem Line	Mount Kisco	Westchester, NY	New York Central	Disabled access		
Mount Pleasant	Harlem Line	Mount Pleasant	Westchester, NY	New York Central			
Mount Vernon East	New Haven Line	Mount Vernon	Westchester, NY	New Haven	‡		Rebuilt by Metro-North
Mount Vernon West	Harlem Line	Mount Vernon	Westchester, NY	New York Central	Disabled access	1914	
Nanuet	Pascack Valley Line	Nanuet	Rockland, NY	Erie	‡		NJT station leased to Metro-North
Naugatuck	Waterbury Branch	Naugatuck	New Haven, CT	New Haven			
New Canaan	New Canaan Branch	New Canaan	Fairfield, CT	New Haven	‡	1868	
New Hamburg	Hudson Line	New Hamburg	Dutchess, NY	New York Central	Disabled access	October 17, 1981	Rebuilt by the MTA; station was closed by Penn Central on July 2, 1973
New Rochelle	New Haven Line	New Rochelle	Westchester, NY	New Haven	‡	1877	Also serves Amtrak's Northeast Regional
North White Plains	Harlem Line	White Plains	Westchester, NY	New York Central	Disabled access	1972	Built by Penn Central; Replaced former Holland Avenue NYC station
Noroton Heights	New Haven Line; Danbury Branch	Darien	Fairfield, CT	New Haven			
Old Greenwich	New Haven Line	Greenwich	Fairfield, CT	New Haven		1892	
Ossining	Hudson Line	Ossining	Westchester, NY	New York Central		1914	Replaced 1848-built Hudson River Railroad depot
Otisville	Port Jervis Line	Otisville	Orange, NY	Erie			
Patterson	Harlem Line	Patterson	Putnam, NY	New York Central	‡		
Pawling	Harlem Line	Pawling	Dutchess, NY	New York Central	‡		
Pearl River	Pascack Valley Line	Pearl River	Rockland, NY	Erie			NJT station leased to Metro-North
Peekskill	Hudson Line	Peekskill	Westchester, NY	New York Central		1874	
Pelham	New Haven Line	Pelham	Westchester, NY	New Haven		1893	
Philipse Manor	Hudson Line	Sleepy Hollow	Westchester, NY	New York Central		1910	
Pleasantville	Harlem Line	Pleasantville	Westchester, NY	New York Central		1846	Rebuilt 1905, 1959 and moved to current location
Port Chester	New Haven Line	Port Chester	Westchester, NY	New Haven		1890	
Port Jervis	Port Jervis Line	Port Jervis	Orange, NY	Erie		1980s	Replacement for Erie Depot
Poughkeepsie	Hudson Line	Poughkeepsie	Dutchess, NY	New York Central	‡	1918	Also serves Amtrak's Adirondack, Berkshire Flyer, Empire Service, Ethan Allen Express, Lake Shore Limited, and Maple Leaf trains.
Purdy's	Harlem Line	North Salem	Westchester, NY	New York Central		1847	
Redding	Danbury Branch	Redding	Fairfield, CT	New Haven	‡		Also called "West Redding station."
Riverdale	Hudson Line	Riverdale	The Bronx, NY	New York Central	‡		
Riverside	New Haven Line	Greenwich	Fairfield, CT	New Haven			
Rowayton	New Haven Line; Danbury Branch	Norwalk	Fairfield, CT	New Haven			
Rye	New Haven Line	Rye	Westchester, NY	New Haven	‡		Rebuilt by Metro-North; Served by Amtrak from 1972 to 1987.
Salisbury Mills–Cornwall	Port Jervis Line	Beaver Dam Lake/Salisbury Mills	Orange, NY	Erie	Disabled access	1983	
Scarborough	Hudson Line	Scarborough	Westchester, NY	New York Central			
Scarsdale	Harlem Line	Scarsdale	Westchester, NY	New York Central		1904	Replaced former NY&H Depot; Listed on the National Register of Historic Places
Seymour	Waterbury Branch	Seymour	New Haven, CT	New Haven			
Sloatsburg	Port Jervis Line	Sloatsburg	Rockland, NY	Erie		1868	
South Norwalk	New Haven Line; Danbury Branch	Norwalk	Fairfield, CT	New Haven	‡	1994	Rebuilt by Metro-North and CDOT; replaced former New Haven Depot.
Southeast	Harlem Line	Town of Southeast	Putnam, NY	New York Central	Disabled access	December 1, 1980	Replacement for Dykeman's station (Formerly Brewster North)
Southport	New Haven Line	Fairfield	Fairfield, CT	New Haven		1884	
Spring Valley	Pascack Valley Line	Spring Valley	Rockland, NY	Erie		1842	NJT station leased to Metro-North
Springdale	New Canaan Branch	Stamford	Fairfield, CT	New Haven			
Spuyten Duyvil	Hudson Line	Spuyten Duyvil	The Bronx, NY	New York Central	Disabled access	Circa 1871	
Stamford	New Haven Line; New Canaan Branch; Danbury Branch	Stamford	Fairfield, CT	New Haven	‡	1987	Rebuilt by Metro-North and CDOT; Replaced former New Haven Depot; Also serves Amtrak's Acela, Northeast Regional, and Vermonter trains.
New Haven State Street	New Haven Line	New Haven	New Haven, CT	New Haven	‡	June 7, 2002	Built by CDOT; Also serves CT Rail's Shore Line East and Hartford Line and Amtrak's Hartford Line, Northeast Regional, and Valley Flyer trains.
Stratford	New Haven Line; Waterbury Branch	Stratford	Fairfield, CT	New Haven			
Suffern	Port Jervis Line	Suffern	Rockland, NY	Erie		1941	NJT station used by Metro-North.
Talmadge Hill	New Canaan Branch	New Canaan	Fairfield, CT	New Haven	Disabled access	1868	
Tarrytown	Hudson Line	Tarrytown	Westchester, NY	New York Central	Disabled access	1925	Replaced 1890 depot that was burned in a 1922 cigarette fire.
Tenmile River	Harlem Line	Town of Amenia	Dutchess, NY	New York Central	‡	July 9, 2000	Rebuilt by Metro-North; Replacement for State School NYC station
Tremont	Harlem Line	Tremont	The Bronx, NY	New York Central			
Tuckahoe	Harlem Line	Tuckahoe	Westchester, NY	New York Central		1901	Replaced former NY&H Depot
Tuxedo	Port Jervis Line	Tuxedo	Orange, NY	Erie		1885	
Union Station	New Haven Line	New Haven	New Haven, CT	New Haven	‡	1920	Also serves CT Rail's Shore Line East and Hartford Line and Amtrak's Acela, Hartford Line, Northeast Regional, Valley Flyer, and Vermonter trains.
University Heights	Hudson Line	University Heights	The Bronx, NY	New York Central	‡		Also served Putnam Branch until 1958
Valhalla	Harlem Line	Valhalla	Westchester, NY	New York Central		1890	
Wakefield	Harlem Line	Wakefield	The Bronx, NY	New York Central	Disabled access		
Wassaic	Harlem Line	Wassaic	Dutchess, NY	New York Central	‡	July 9, 2000	Rebuilt by Metro-North
Waterbury	Waterbury Branch	Waterbury	New Haven, CT	New Haven	‡		Replaced former Waterbury Union Station
West Haven	New Haven Line	West Haven	New Haven, CT	New Haven	‡	August 18, 2013	
Westport	New Haven Line	Westport	Fairfield, CT	New Haven	‡		
White Plains	Harlem Line	White Plains	Westchester, NY	New York Central	‡	1844	Built by Metro-North; Replaced former Warren & Wetmore-built NYC Depot
Williams Bridge	Harlem Line	Williamsbridge	The Bronx, NY	New York Central	‡	Circa 1842	
Wilton	Danbury Branch	Wilton	Fairfield, CT	New Haven	Disabled access		
Woodlawn	Harlem Line	Woodlawn	The Bronx, NY	New York Central		Circa 1844	Also served New Haven Line trains from 1848 to 1924
Yankees–East 153rd Street	Hudson Line	Highbridge and Concourse	The Bronx, NY	New York Central	‡	May 23, 2009	Built by Metro-North; Also serves Harlem Line and New Haven Line on Yankee Game Days
Yonkers	Hudson Line	Yonkers	Westchester, NY	New York Central	‡	1911	Also serves Amtrak's Adirondack, Berkshire Flyer, Empire Service, Ethan Allen Express, and Maple Leaf trains.

== Former stations ==
This list only includes stations that were closed by Metro-North after the railroad's formation in 1983. It does not include stations closed by the New York Central Railroad, Penn Central Railroad, New York, New Haven and Hartford Railroad, Erie Railroad, Erie-Lackawanna Railroad, or Conrail, or the MTA pre-1983.

Station	Line	Municipality	County	Former railroad	Opened	Closed	Notes
Chester	Port Jervis Line	Village of Chester	Orange, NY	Erie		April 16, 1983	
Croton North	Hudson Line	Croton-on-Hudson	Westchester, NY	New York Central	1890s 1983	1960s 1984	Briefly reopened by Metro-North
Crugers	Hudson Line	Crugers	Westchester, NY	New York Central		June 30, 1996	This station along with Montrose were replaced by a new station at Cortlandt
Goshen	Port Jervis Line	Goshen	Orange, NY	Erie		1984	
Harriman	Port Jervis Line	Harriman	Orange, NY	Erie	1911	April 16, 1983	Replaced stations built in 1838 and 1873
Kensico Cemetery	Harlem Line	Valhalla	Westchester, NY	New York Central		1983	
Kent Road	Danbury Branch	Wilton	Fairfield, CT	New Haven	January 12, 1976	January 16, 1994	Built by Penn Central; Replaced former South Wilton station
Middletown	Port Jervis Line	Middletown	Orange, NY	Erie	1896	April 16, 1983	Replaced a station built in 1843; Now a local library
Monroe	Port Jervis Line	Monroe Township	Orange, NY	Erie		1984	
Montrose	Hudson Line	Montrose	Westchester, NY	New York Central		June 30, 1996	This station along with Crugers were replaced by a new station at Cortlandt
Thornwood	Harlem Line	Thornwood	Westchester, NY	New York Central		March 5, 1984	
Union Station	Danbury Branch	Danbury	Fairfield, CT	New Haven	1902	1993	Now the Danbury Railway Museum; replaced by Danbury

== Proposed stations ==
Station	Line	Municipality	County	Notes
Barnum	New Haven Line	East Bridgeport	Fairfield, CT	Project indefinitely postponed due to budgetary reasons.
Brookfield	Danbury Branch	Brookfield	Fairfield, CT	Served by Penn Central until 1971; new station part of planned Danbury Branch extension to New Milford
Co-op City	New Haven Line	Co-op City	Bronx, NY	Planned to open in 2027; part of Penn Station Access project
Georgetown	Danbury Branch	Georgetown	Fairfield, CT	Served by Penn Central until 1970
Hunts Point	New Haven Line	Hunts Point	Bronx, NY	Planned to open in 2027; part of Penn Station Access project
Morris Park	New Haven Line	Morris Park	Bronx, NY	Planned to open in 2027; part of Penn Station Access project
New Milford	Danbury Branch	New Milford	Litchfield, CT	Served by Penn Central until 1971; new station part of planned Danbury Branch extension to New Milford
North Danbury	Danbury Branch	Danbury	Fairfield, CT	Part of planned Danbury Branch extension to New Milford
Orange	New Haven Line	Orange	New Haven, CT	Project indefinitely postponed due to budgetary reasons.
Parkchester/Van Nest	New Haven Line	Parkchester	Bronx, NY	Planned to open in 2027; part of Penn Station Access project
Sunnyside	New Haven Line	Sunnyside	Queens, NY	Post-completion of Penn Station Access project
West 125th St	Hudson Line	New York	New York, NY	Proposed as part of Phase 2 of West Side Access.
West 62nd St	Hudson Line	New York	New York, NY	Proposed as part of Phase 2 of West Side Access.

== Divisions no longer in service ==
- Putnam Division (New York and Putnam Railroad)
- Beacon Division (Beacon Line)
- Upper Harlem Division (New York Central Railroad)
