= Wilton railway station =

Wilton railway station or Wilton station may refer to

- Wilton station (Metro-North), in Wilton, Connecticut, United States
- Wilton station (North Dakota), in Wilton, North Dakota, United States
- Wilton North railway station, on the Salisbury branch line of the Great Western Railway
- Wilton South railway station, on the London and South Western Railway West of England Line
- South Wilton station, in Wilton, Connecticut, United States

== See also ==
- Williton railway station on the West Somerset Railway
- Witton railway station in Birmingham
