= Wall Street station (Connecticut) =

Defunct station on the Danbury and Norwalk Railroad

Norwalk
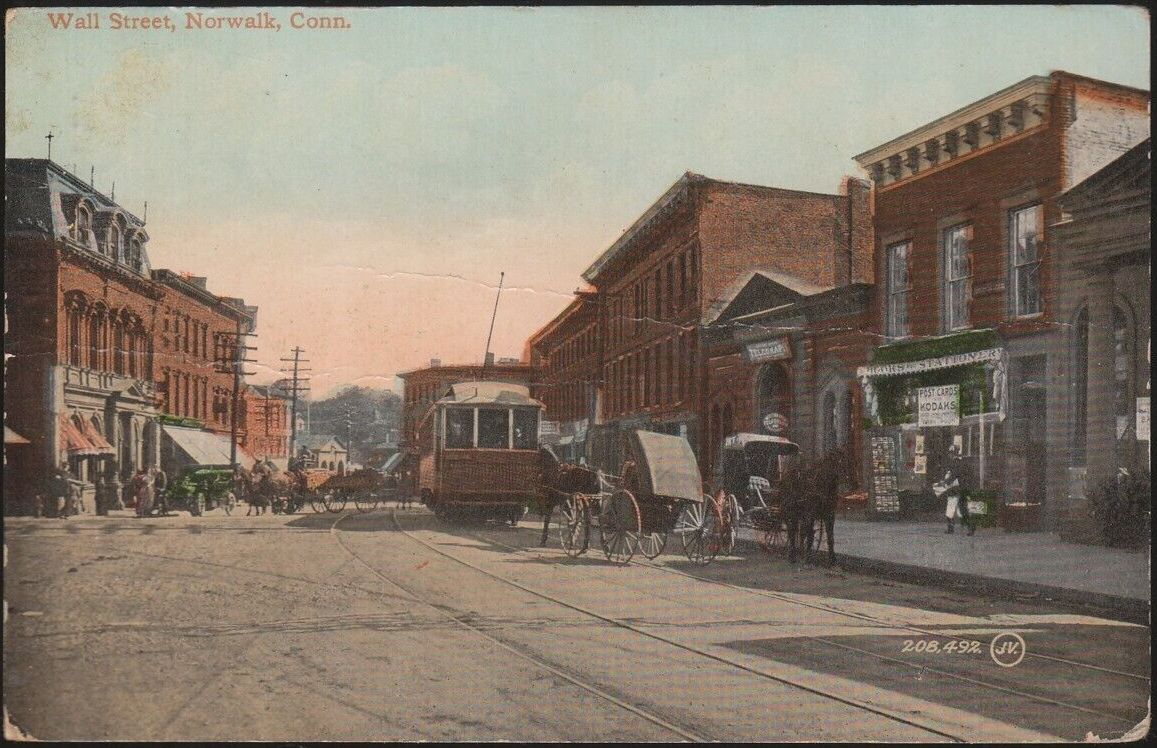
- 1913 postcard of Wall Street, Norwalk. The station is the low building to the right of the streetcar.

General information
- Location: 47 Wall Street; Norwalk, Connecticut
- Coordinates: 41.117829°N 73.412975°W
- Line: Danbury Branch
- Platforms: 1 side platform
- Tracks: 1

History
- Opened: 1852
- Closed: c. 1956
- Previous names: Norwalk

Former services
Preceding station	New York, New Haven and Hartford Railroad	Following station
South Norwalk toward Norwalk and South Norwalk	Pittsfield Branch	Kent Road toward Pittsfield
Location

Norwalk station (also called Wall Street) was a station on the Danbury and Norwalk Railroad (later the Danbury Branch of the Housatonic Railroad and the New York, New Haven, and Hartford Railroad) located in Norwalk, Connecticut. It opened in 1852 and closed around 1956. A new station at the site has been considered.

== History ==
The station opened in 1852 as an original station on the Danbury and Norwalk Railroad. The original depot was replaced in 1859. The depot still stands today as a tattoo business. Located over the tracks, the station building had stairs that led down to the single side platform west of the single track. The station would continue to serve passengers until the Flood of 1955, which caused major damage to the Wall Street area and consequently severely limited service. The following year, the NYNH&H discontinued service to the station.

With recent increases in housing and business growth in the Wall Street area, ConnDOT has begun considering a new station at Wall Street. In July 2018, the study was approved by the State Bond Commission. The study, which was released in July 2022, concluded that a station stop near Wall Street is not recommended at this time.
