= Meeker's Hardware =

- U.S. National Register of Historic Places
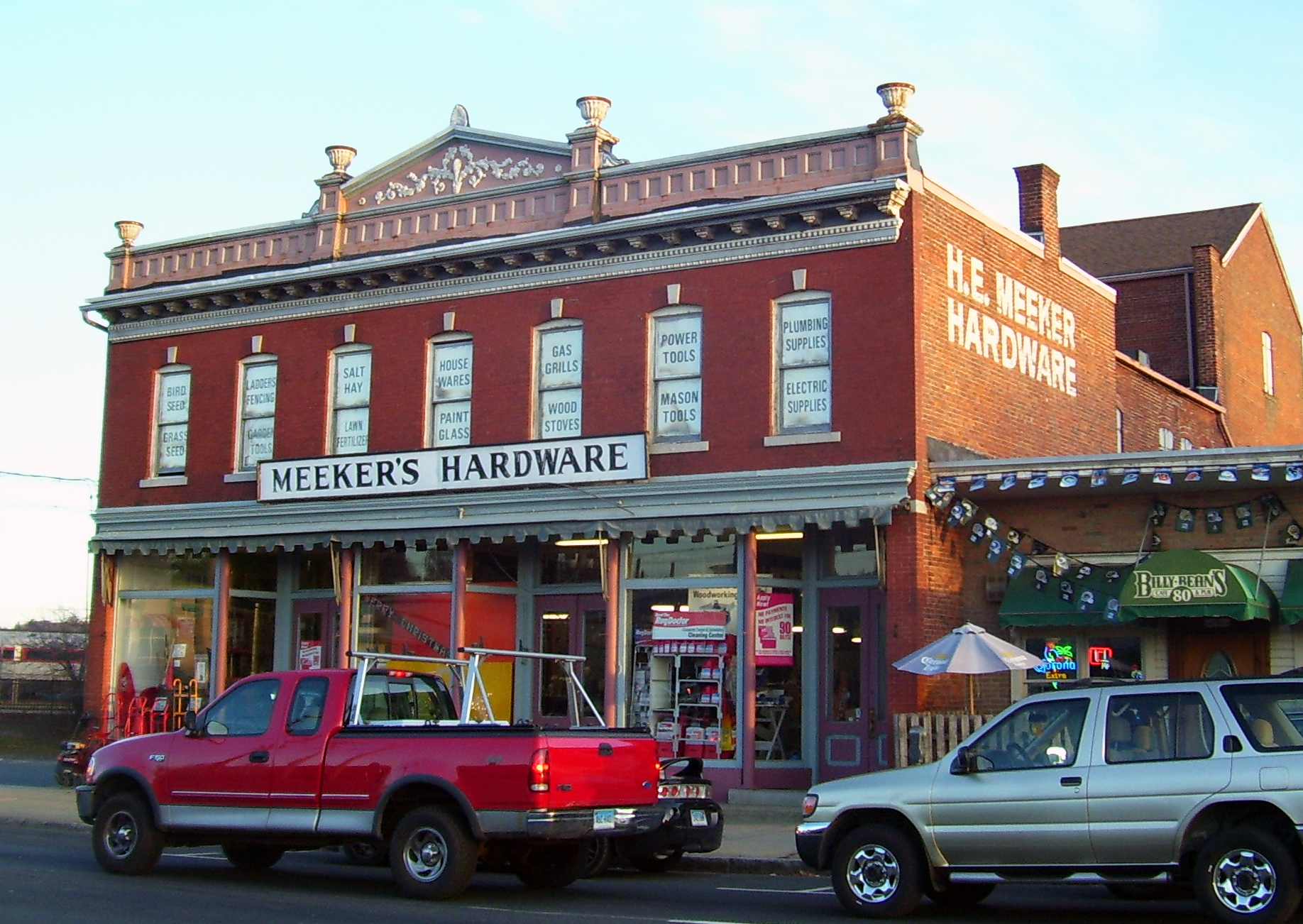
- Store in 2007
- Location: Danbury, CT
- Coordinates: 41°23′52″N 73°27′04″W
- Built: 1883
- Architectural style: Classical Revival
- NRHP reference No.: 83001253
- Added to NRHP: June 9, 1983

Meeker's Hardware (also known as The Red Block) is located at White Street and Patriot Drive in downtown Danbury, Connecticut, United States, near the city's train station and the Danbury Railway Museum, just outside the city's Main Street Historic District. It was built in 1883, opened in 1885 and remained in the Meeker family until 2013. It was added to the National Register of Historic Places in 1983. It was the only hardware store on the Register. The Classical Revival exterior features a brick face with seven bays and a frieze at the top boasting a central pediment above its cornice. The name of the store is painted on both outside walls and displayed prominently in the front between the two stories. It is complemented by an interior that remains much as it did in the late 19th century. A vintage cash register is still in use. Tools and supplies are stocked in wooden shelves and compartments with thick, unfinished hardwood flooring beneath and high ceilings above, with ceiling fans to cool the building in the summertime.

Ad for ten-cent Pepsis

On the northeast wall of the building there is a large advertisement for ten-cent Pepsi drinks, using the old logo. This was not just a decorative touch; the drink was available in the store in three-US-ounce (90 mL) plastic cups for that price. Originally the sign advertised Coca-Cola for five cents, which the store sold starting in 1983; it was a landmark to most visitors arriving at the nearby train station. The store switched to Pepsi and raised the price to ten cents in 2006 after the local Coca-Cola bottler told them they would have to install newer fountain equipment that would make the drinks unprofitable.

In 2013, the hardware store closed. It remained vacant until Vazquez Soccerchamp Sports took over in 2016.

== See also ==
- National Register of Historic Places listings in Fairfield County, Connecticut
