= Berkshire (NH train) =

Overview
- Service type: Inter-city rail
- Status: Discontinued
- Locale: Northeastern United States
- Predecessor: Berkshire Express
- First service: ca. 1946
- Last service: 1968
- Former operator: New York, New Haven and Hartford Railroad

Route
- Termini: New York City; Pittsfield, Massachusetts
- Distance travelled: 154 miles (248 km)
- Average journey time: 4 hours, 22 minutes, northbound 4 hours, 30 minutes, southbound
- Service frequency: Daily, except Sunday (1955)
- Train numbers: Southbound: 141; Northbound: 144

On-board services
- Seating arrangements: Coach
- Catering facilities: Diner-lounge (1955)

Technical
- Track gauge: 4 ft 8 1/2 in (1,435 mm) standard gauge

The Berkshire was a New York, New Haven and Hartford Railroad ('New Haven') named train running from New York City's Grand Central Terminal to Pittsfield, Massachusetts. It was the longest-running north–south train in Litchfield Hills of western Connecticut and the Berkshires of Massachusetts. From New York City it followed the New Haven Line to South Norwalk, the Danbury Line to Danbury and the Berkshire Division to Pittsfield. It began in the 1940s and ran until 1968. The train was preceded by the Berkshire Express, of c.1938-c.1943. It terminated at Pittsfield Union Station until 1960, when the New Haven moved it to another station in the city.

While the route operated each day excepting Sunday, there were local stops unnamed trains available on Sundays. At peak years of post-World War II service the route was supplemented by other named trains for the New Haven's Berkshire Division route: Housatonic, Litchfield, Mahaiwe, Mahkeenac, Taconic.

The route served as a path to country homes of New Yorkers, as well as to towns such as Canaan and New Milford in the transportation service-neglected northwest Connecticut, an area lacking Interstate highways or major airports. The route south of Danbury Union Station towards South Norwalk station was electrified until 1961. North from New Milford to Canaan, short of the Connecticut-Massachusetts state line, the route followed the Housatonic River. In summer months the train made stops in Lenox, Massachusetts, the town hosting the Tanglewood Music Festival.

== Decline ==
By 1961 the Berkshire was cut to a Friday north-bound run; the Litchfield operated as a Sunday evening route from Pittsfield to New York. The diner-lounge was eliminated by 1961 in favor of parlor cars. Finally, in 1968, the Berkshire name was dropped, and unnamed trains served the route until 1971 when the New Haven successor Penn Central discontinued service on the line.
