= North Danbury station =

Metro-North Railroad station in Connecticut

North Danbury

General information
- Location: 67 White Turkey Road Ext. Danbury, CT, 06810
- Coordinates: 41.4285°N 73.4113°W
- Owner: ConnDOT
- Line: Danbury Branch
- Platforms: 1 side platform
- Tracks: 2

Construction
- Accessible: yes

Other information
- Fare zone: 43

Proposed services
| Preceding station | Metro-North Railroad | Following station |
|---|---|---|
| Danbury toward South Norwalk, Stamford or Grand Central | Danbury Branch | Brookfield toward New Milford |
Location

North Danbury station is a proposed commuter rail stop on the Danbury Branch of the Metro-North Railroad's New Haven Line, to be located in Danbury, Connecticut.

== History ==
Plans call for the station to be located at the current park and ride at 67 White Turkey Road Ext, adjacent to the Brookfield-Danbury border. Original plans for the station had surfaced in 2009–2010, when a study was conducted to determine the viability of the station. Although plans had gone under for a while, improvements being made to the line by the State of Connecticut could mean a station in the near future. In September 2020, due to an increase in demand for expansion of commuter rail service to Greater Danbury, the United States Department of Transportation awarded a $400,000 grant to the Western Connecticut Council of Governments to study improvements along the Danbury Branch line and develop a plan for expanding service north. This would include the construction of a North Danbury, Brookfield and New Milford station.
