= Danbury Railway Museum =

Railway museum in the U.S. state of Connecticut

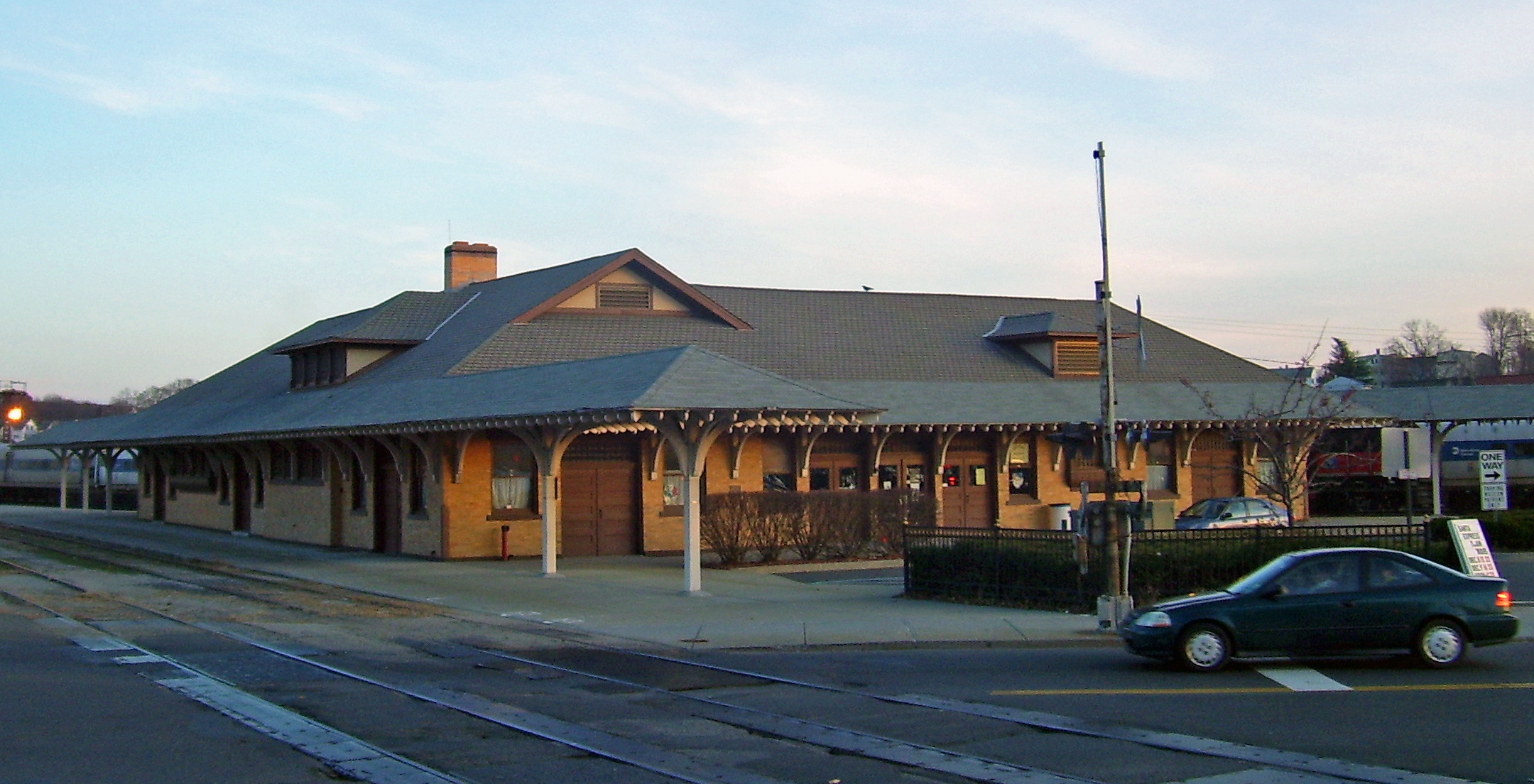
- Established: 1994
- Location: 120 White Street, Danbury, Connecticut
- Coordinates: 41.397842°N 73.450461°W
- Type: Railroad History
- Public transit access: Danbury; HARTransit: 2, 7, 8
- Website: danburyrail.org
- Union Station
- U.S. National Register of Historic Places
- Coordinates: 41.3980°N 73.4501°W
- Area: 1.3 acres (5,300 m^{2})
- Built: 1902
- Architect: A. Malkin
- Architectural style: Romanesque Revival
- NRHP reference No.: 86002750
- Added to NRHP: September 25, 1986

Danbury

Former services
Preceding station	Metro-North Railroad	Following station
Bethel toward South Norwalk, Stamford or Grand Central	Danbury Branch	Terminus
Preceding station	New York, New Haven and Hartford Railroad	Following station
Bethel toward Norwalk and South Norwalk	Pittsfield Branch	Brookfield toward Pittsfield
Location

- New Haven Railroad Danbury Turntable
- U.S. National Register of Historic Places
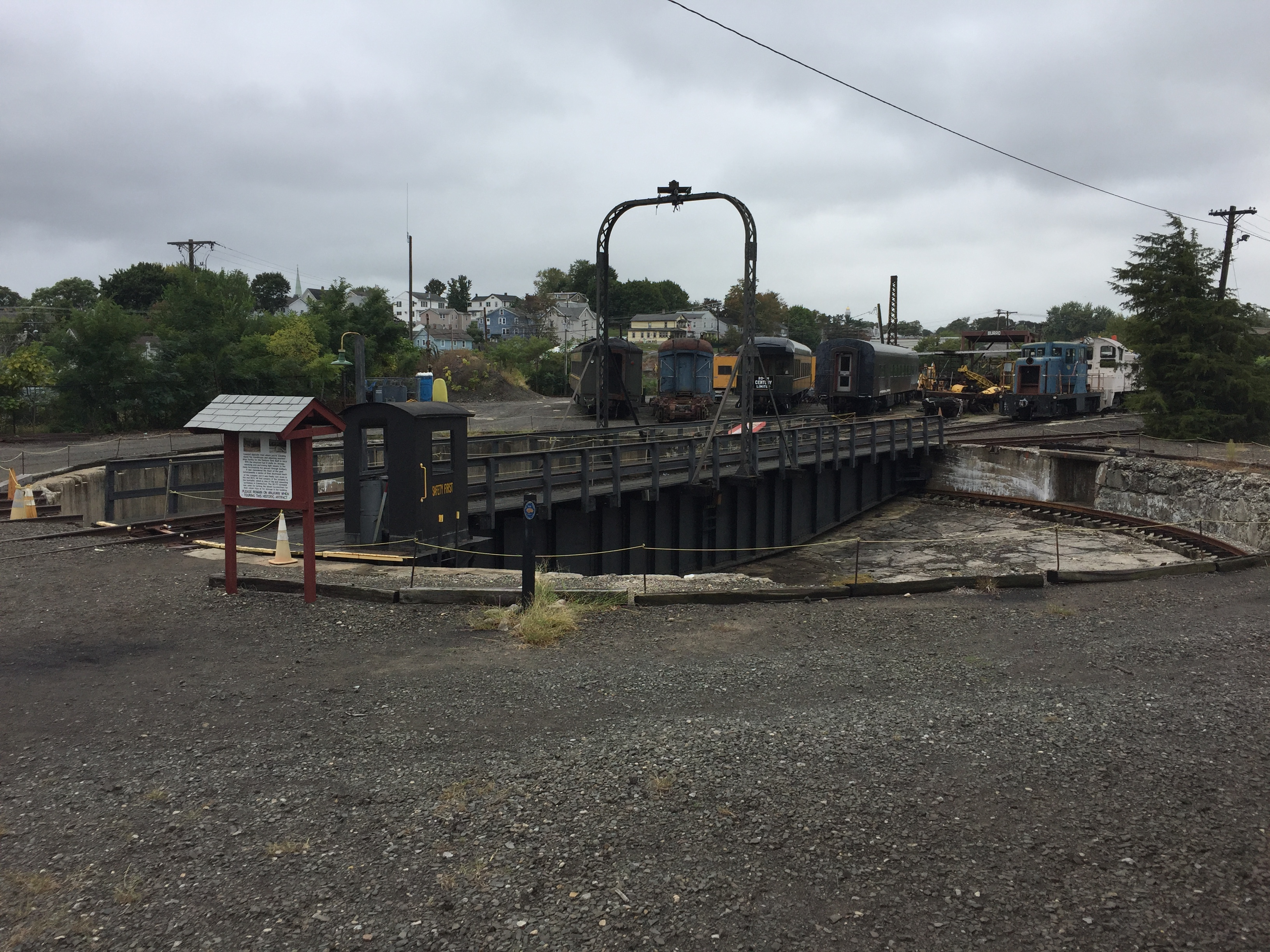
- Railway Turntable in October 2016
- Coordinates: 41°23′49.9″N 73°26′46.6″W
- Area: 3 acres (12,000 m^{2})
- Built: 1916
- Architects: Nichols, Geo. P. & Bro.; American Bridge Co.
- Architectural style: Center-bearing deck girder
- NRHP reference No.: 05001048
- Added to NRHP: September 15, 2005

The Danbury Railway Museum (reporting mark DRMX) is housed in the former Union Station on the east end of downtown Danbury, Connecticut, United States. It was established in the mid-1990s following the closure of the station by the Metro-North Railroad in favor of a new station nearby, and primarily focuses on the history of railroading in southern New England and neighboring New York. In addition to the former station building, the museum has a collection of heritage railcars in the neighboring rail yard it shares with Metro-North.

The station was built in 1903 by the New York, New Haven and Hartford Railroad in response to local pressure for a new station after the three railroads that served the city were merged into the New Haven. At its peak, 125 trains stopped there each day. By 1993, that had dwindled to a few commuter trains, and the Connecticut Department of Transportation, which by then owned the neglected building, closed it in favor of a newer station on the other side of the block. Within two years the museum was formed and restored the station to its former appearance.

It is architecturally distinctive, with Colonial Revival touches on a Richardsonian Romanesque structure. Alfred Hitchcock filmed station scenes for Strangers on a Train on its distinctive curved platform. In 1986, prior to the museum's use of the building, it was listed on the National Register of Historic Places. It was joined on the Register in 2005 by the former turntable, the only intact one in the state.

== Site ==
The museum itself is located on a 1.3-acre (0.53 ha) lot at the southeast corner of White Street and Patriot Drive, just across from Meeker's Hardware, which is also on the Register. To its west is a parking lot with room for 25 cars. Immediately behind it, to the south, are the railroad tracks and a 6-acre (2.4 ha) rail yard. The current Danbury station is a short distance away, and sometimes Metro-North stores its trains on the tracks behind the station between runs. The museum's collection of older cars is on the tracks in the yard's interior. A grade crossing on White marks the eastern terminus of the Beacon Line kept in reserve by Metro-North for possible future use.

=== Building ===
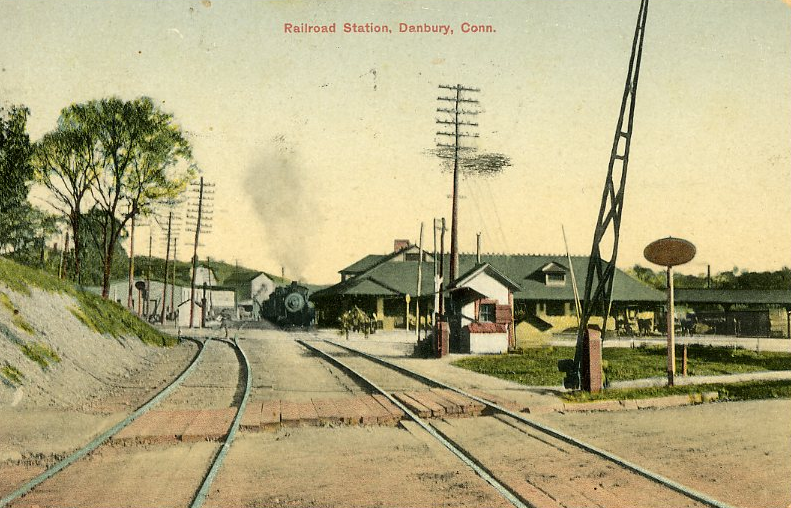
Danbury station, ca. 1910

The station building is a one-story L-shaped structure of buff and brown brick with sandstone trim, 99 by 123 feet (30 by 37 m), both wings topped with gabled roofs covered in asphalt. Hipped-roof dormer windows pierce the north and west elevations, and similar canopies run along the tracks on either side, continuing the overhanging bracketed eaves that shelter the platform on the building itself. A single chimney rises from the south end of the station, near where the sets of tracks meet.

Windows vary in size and shape. Those on the east are high and small, whereas tall windows that give the impression of sidelights are along the southwest, next to the tracks. These are hints of the Colonial Revival style that was emerging at the time of the station's construction.

Inside, the museum's exhibits and displays occupy the 74-by-40-foot (23 by 12 m) southern half of the building, its former waiting room. In the northern half, is the museum's gift shop and restrooms. The original ticket window and the varnished pine door and window architraves. Immediately east of the entry is a fireplace whose mantel is decorated in molded brick in floral patterns.

The facility comprises a railroad yard full of restored and unrestored railroad equipment, and the restored station house containing exhibits of photographs and railroad paraphernalia, model train layouts, an extensive reference library, and a gift shop. The station is "significant in the history of Danbury" and also as a "good example" of a turn-of-the-twentieth-century railway station building. Its architectural style of the hip-roofed station is eclectic, with exterior Richardsonian and Colonial Revival elements. Its interior workmanship is more impressive.

=== Yard ===
Visitors can ride the "Rail Yard Local" on weekends in the summer season. The ride takes about 30–35 minutes and includes a unique ride by the passengers on the museum's operating turntable, and a tour of the recently restored Danbury fairground's pumphouse. The turntable was added to the National Register of Historic Places on September 15, 2005. The turntable, built around 1914 was originally part of a roundhouse and machine shop complex. A fire destroyed the buildings in the 1980s, leaving "the only intact surviving [railroad] turntable in Connecticut". It is essentially a swing bridge, and is located several hundred yards east of the station.

Some of the rolling stock in the yard, including its 1907-built 2-6-0 steam locomotive (B&M #1455), two cabooses, a Budd Company self-propelled rail diesel car, and a Sperry track inspection car, are open to the visitors. The museum is an all-volunteer operation and welcomes anyone who would like to participate in any of the many facets of its operations – including operating its locomotives and self-propelled cars.

== History ==
By the 1880s, the three railroads that served the city — the Danbury and Norwalk, Housatonic and New York and New England — had built small, separate stations for their lines in the vicinity of the current building. Later in that decade, economic difficulties led to them all becoming part of the New York, New Haven and Hartford, leading it to be known locally as the Consolidated Road. Citizens began asking the new owner to consolidate its three stations into one as early as 1894, two years after the last merger.

In 1901, the Consolidated realigned the tracks and built the new station where the New York & New England's passenger depot had been. A. Malkin's design combined a basic Richardsonian Romanesque structure with some Colonial Revival details, like the small panes in the windows. It was said to be the largest station on the New Haven's New York Division.

In its peak years, early in the 20th century, extant timetables suggest the station saw as many as 125 trains a day. Much of that passenger traffic was related to the city's large hatmaking industry, with workers migrating to and from jobs, and business travelers selling to or buying from the hatmakers. It was acknowledged with a neon sign on a nearby coal shed showing a derby hat coming down on a crown and saying "Danbury Crowns Them All". The hat-related traffic grew around the industry's two big seasons, the Christmas and Easter holidays. Other passengers were commuters going to jobs in Bridgeport or New York City, summer travelers headed for country retreats and hotels in the area, or visitors to the Danbury Fair, held every October.

After World War II, train ridership began to decline with the rise of passenger air travel and the Interstate Highway System. The decline of hatmaking, as many Americans started going around bareheaded, also contributed. Many of the station's original decorative features were removed. The New Haven's passenger train services to northwestern Connecticut, the Berkshires and to Pittsfield, Massachusetts were cut to weekend-only service by 1961. The last named train on the route, the Berkshire, was discontinued in 1968. In the late 1960s the Consolidated was itself absorbed into the short-lived Penn Central conglomerate. The last intercity passenger train left for Pittsfield in 1972, and the next year the Penn Central's final failure put its trains in the hands of Conrail and the station itself became property of the state Department of Transportation (ConnDOT).

Metro-North closed the station, the northern terminus of the New Haven Line's Danbury Branch, in 1993. The city's mayor, Gene Eriquez, who had seen downtown wither as retail business and customers went to the mall built on the former fairgrounds, did not want to see another old building lost to urban blight. The station seemed to him and others the ideal place for a rail museum that could attract visitors, and the Danbury Railway Museum was formed the next year by a group of National Railway Historical Society and local railfans.

The museum soon grew to a hundred members, and the first excursion train was run later that year. A temporary museum was established in an Ives Street storefront while the old station itself was restored with a $1.5 million grant. In late 1995 the restored station was rededicated at a ceremony attended by the mayor and a thousand people. The museum interior was opened in the middle of the following year.

The turntable was restored in 1998. Since 2005 it has been a regular stop on the Railyard Local. As of 2010, the museum has 550 members and 60 pieces of equipment.

== Equipment ==
=== Locomotives ===
Locomotive details
Name	Class	Locomotive Type	Image	Manufacturer	Year built	Status	Notes
New York Central 100	S-Motor	Electric (Third rail)		ALCO	1904	Under restoration	The first of its class built
Boston & Maine 1455	B-15	Steam		ALCO	1907	On display	The only of its class surviving
New York Central 278	T-Motor	Electric (Third rail)		ALCO	1926	Under restoration	The only of its class surviving
Electric Boat Carol	44 Tonner	Diesel	N/A	ALCO	1945	On display	Originally saw service on the New Haven Railroad as #814, before being sold to the Electric Boat
Metro-North 413	FP10	Diesel		EMD	1946	Operational	The oldest active mainline locomotive in North America before retirement. Fully restored in September 2026
Electric Boat Diane	44 Tonner	Diesel	N/A	ALCO	1947	On display	Originally a GE demonstrator locomotive numbered 1399, then sold to the Union Pacific, then the Electric Boat
Long Island Railroad 617	FA-1	Diesel (Converted to NPCU in 1974)		ALCO	1947	On display	Saved from a scrapper in New Jersey
New Haven Railroad 673	RS-1	Diesel		ALCO	1948	Operational	Reportedly to be retired in 1995
VLIX 1513	RSC-2	Diesel	N/A	ALCO	1949	On display	Leased from Ed Bowers
Boston & Maine 1127	SW1	Diesel	N/A	EMD	1953	On display	Only B&M SW1 fitted with MU Controls
Connecticut DOT 605	RS-3m	Diesel		ALCO	1953	Operational	Was also used on the Metro North
Pfizer 1	SW8	Diesel		EMD	1953	On display	Was also used on the Rock Island
New Haven Railroad 2006	FL9	Dual mode (Diesel + electric via Third Rail)		EMD	1955	On display	Leased from Connecticut DOT
New Haven Railroad 1402	RS-11	Diesel	N/A	ALCO	1956	On display	Only New Haven RS-11 preserved
Canadian National 6786	FPB-4	Diesel	N/A	Montreal Locomotive Works	1959	On display	
Canadian National 6787	FPB-4	Diesel	N/A	Montreal Locomotive Works	1959	On display	
New York Central 2013	FL9	Dual mode (Diesel + electric via Third Rail)		EMD	1960	On display	
Amtrak 917	AEM-7AC	Electric (Overhead)		EMD	1980	On display	

Multiple Units
Name	Class	Unit Type	Image	Manufacturer	Year built	Status	Notes
New Haven Railroad 32	RDC-1	Diesel		Budd	1953	Operational	Donated by Metro North
New Haven Railroad 47	RDC-1	Diesel		Budd	1953	On display	
New Haven Railroad 4671	Pullman 4400	Electric (Third Rail + Overhead)		Pullman-Standard	1954	On display	Ran on Metro North during its final years of service
New Haven Railroad 4673	Pullman 4400	Electric (Third Rail + Overhead)		Pullman-Standard	1954	On display	Ran on Metro North during its final years of service
New Haven Railroad 4673	Pullman 4400	Electric (Third Rail + Overhead)		Pullman-Standard	1954	On display	One of the 4 "subscription parlor" (lounge) cars built for the New Haven Railroad, and the only that remains
Remington Arms 2	FCD Railbus	Diesel		Mack	1954	On display	This railbus was sold from the New Haven Railroad to Remington Arms before it was sent to the museum
Metro-North 1128	4600 or 4700 Series ACMU	Electric (Third Rail)		Pullman-Standard	1962	On display	The 4500/4600 Series cars were renumbered randomly between 1100-1186
Metro-North 1171	4600 or 4700 Series ACMU	Electric (Third Rail)		Pullman-Standard	1965	On display	The 4500/4600 Series cars were renumbered randomly between 1100-1186
Metro-North 8706-8707	M2	Electric (Third Rail + Overhead)		Budd	1974	On display	The only of its class surviving
Metro-North 8002-8003	M3A	Electric (Third Rail)		Budd	1984-1986	On display	Only M3A cars to be preserved (so far)
Metro-North 8106-8107	M3A	Electric (Third Rail)		Budd	1984-1986	On display	Only M3A cars to be preserved (so far)

=== Rolling stock ===
Rolling stock details
Number / Name	Image	Type	Builder	Built
668 (Empire Club)		Gallery car	Pullman Standard	1954
756		Lounge car	Canadian Car and Foundry	1954
1001		Coach	Budd Company	1980
2001		Coach	Harlan and Hollingsworth	1922
2012		Coach	Harlan and Hollingsworth	1922
2014		Coach	Harlan and Hollingsworth	1922
2015 (John E. Flower)		Coach	Harlan and Hollingsworth	1922
002		Baggage car	Standard Steel Corporation	1911
057		Baggage car	Pennsylvania Railroad	1920s
525 (Stratford Point)		Sleeper car	Pullman Standard	1948
1670 (Sasqua)		Observation/Business car	Altoona Shops	1926
6563		Baggage/Railway Post Office car	Pennsylvania Railroad	1910
Tonawanda Valley		Observation car	Pullman Company	1929
1547		Coach	Bethlehem Steel	1925
1547		Coach	Bethlehem Steel	1925
7625		Flatcar	Central Vermont Railway	1923-1925
996H		Hopper/Scale Test car	Unknown	1966
359020		Mechanical Reefer car	Unknown	1966
33491		Hopper car	Unknown	1974
003, 011		Flatcars	Unknown	Unknown
12516		Tanker car	Unknown	1966
12811		Tanker car	Unknown	1967
T-27		Flatcar	Unknown	1922
33732		Boxcar	Pullman Standard	1947
34537		Boxcar	Pullman Standard	1948
34537		Boxcar	Pullman Standard	1948
41178		Flatcar	Unknown	1906
41XXX		Flatcar	Unknown	1906
60521		Gondola car	New Haven Company	1948
45924		Boxcar	Pennsylvania Railroad	1941
112432		Boxcar	Pennsylvania Railroad	1964
18828		Hopper car	Unknown	1971
34537		Boxcar	Pullman Standard	1948
X-578		Flatcar	Unknown	1902
2762		Flatcar	American Car and Foundry Company	1910
8085		Boxcar	Youngstown Car Company	1924
79462		Caboose	CN Point St. Charles Shops	1971
35815		Caboose	International Car Company	1970
661, 664		Caboose	Union Bridge	1940
C-627		Caboose	Pullman Standard	1944
19322		Caboose	MDT	1909
23662		Caboose	International Car Company	1948
477099		Caboose	Pennsylvania Railroad	1916

=== Maintenance equipment ===
Maintenance equipment details
Number / Name	Image	Type	Builder	Built
270302		Track speeder	Unknown	Unknown
CB3004		Crane	Burro Company	1947
DC-7		Rail Flaw Detection vehicle	Union Pacific Railroad	Unknown
GCT-1 (Wellington)		Double-Ended crane	Industrial Crane Works	1914
M1148		Track speeder	Unknown	1911
BR1201		Ballast Regulator	Unknown	Unknown
514		Track speeder	Northwestern Motor Company	1930s
999951		15-ton scale test car	Pennsylvania Railroad	1909
135		Rail Flaw Detection car	St. Louis Car Company	1928

== See also ==
- List of heritage railroads in the United States
- List of railway museums
- National Register of Historic Places listings in Fairfield County, Connecticut
