= Tenmile River station =

Metro-North Railroad station in New York

Tenmile River
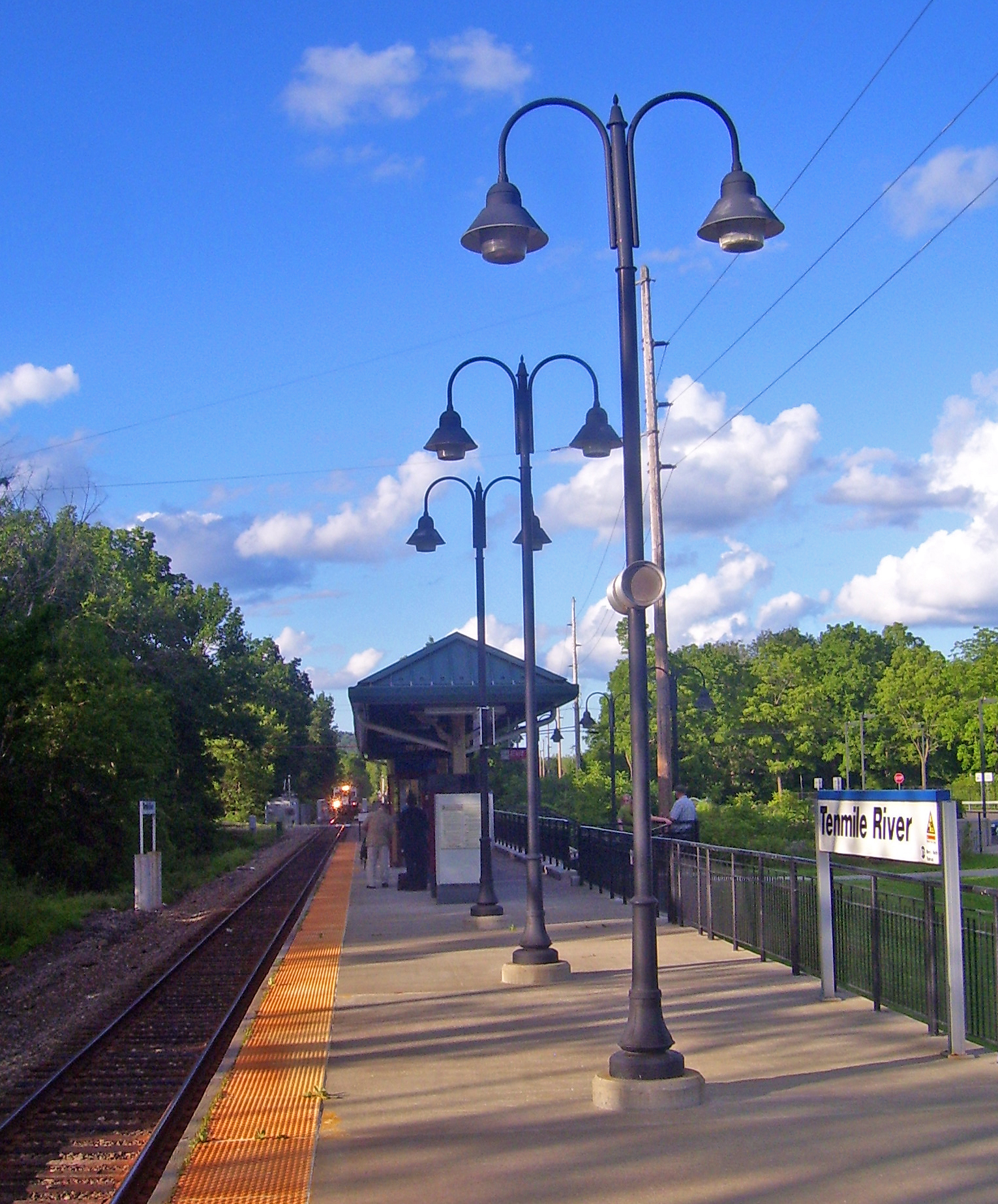
- Southeast-bound train approaching station

General information
- Location: 12 Sinpatch Road, Wassaic, New York
- Coordinates: 41.7795°N 73.5590°W
- Line: Harlem Line
- Platforms: 1 side platform
- Tracks: 1
- Connections: Dutchess County Public Transit: D

Construction
- Accessible: yes

Other information
- Fare zone: 10

History
- Opened: July 9, 2000; 26 years ago
- Former names: State School (New York Central Railroad)

Passengers
- 2018: 36 (Metro-North)
- Rank: 105 of 109

Services
Preceding station	Metro-North Railroad	Following station
Dover Plains toward Southeast or Grand Central	Harlem Line	Wassaic Terminus

Former services
Preceding station	New York Central Railroad	Following station
Dover Plains toward New York	Harlem Division	Wassaic toward Chatham
Location

Tenmile River station is an active commuter railroad station in the town of Amenia, Dutchess County, New York. Located on Sinpatch Road (County Route 105) east of the Tenmile River, the station serves trains of Metro-North Railroad's Harlem Line between Grand Central Terminal and Wassaic station. Tenmile River station is in the non-electrified section of track north of Southeast station. The station consists of a single track and a single high-level side platform.

Tenmile River station sits at the site of the former New York Central Railroad station of State School, named after the former Wassaic State School (which would later become the Taconic Development Center). Service operated until the Penn Central Railroad discontinued service to Chatham to Dover Plains on March 20, 1972. Service returned on July 9, 2000 when the Harlem Line, now under control of the Metropolitan Transportation Authority, was extended back from Dover Plains to Wassaic.

== History ==
The station was re-opened with the Wassaic train station on July 9, 2000. Passenger service was initially abandoned north of Dover Plains by Penn Central in 1972, though the line remained in use for freight.

== Station layout ==
The station has one two-car-long high-level side platform to the east of the track. Unusually, the MTA has placed identifying signage on concrete pilings opposite the platform to complement the signs on the platform itself.
