= Wilton station (Metro-North) =

Metro-North Railroad station in Connecticut

Wilton
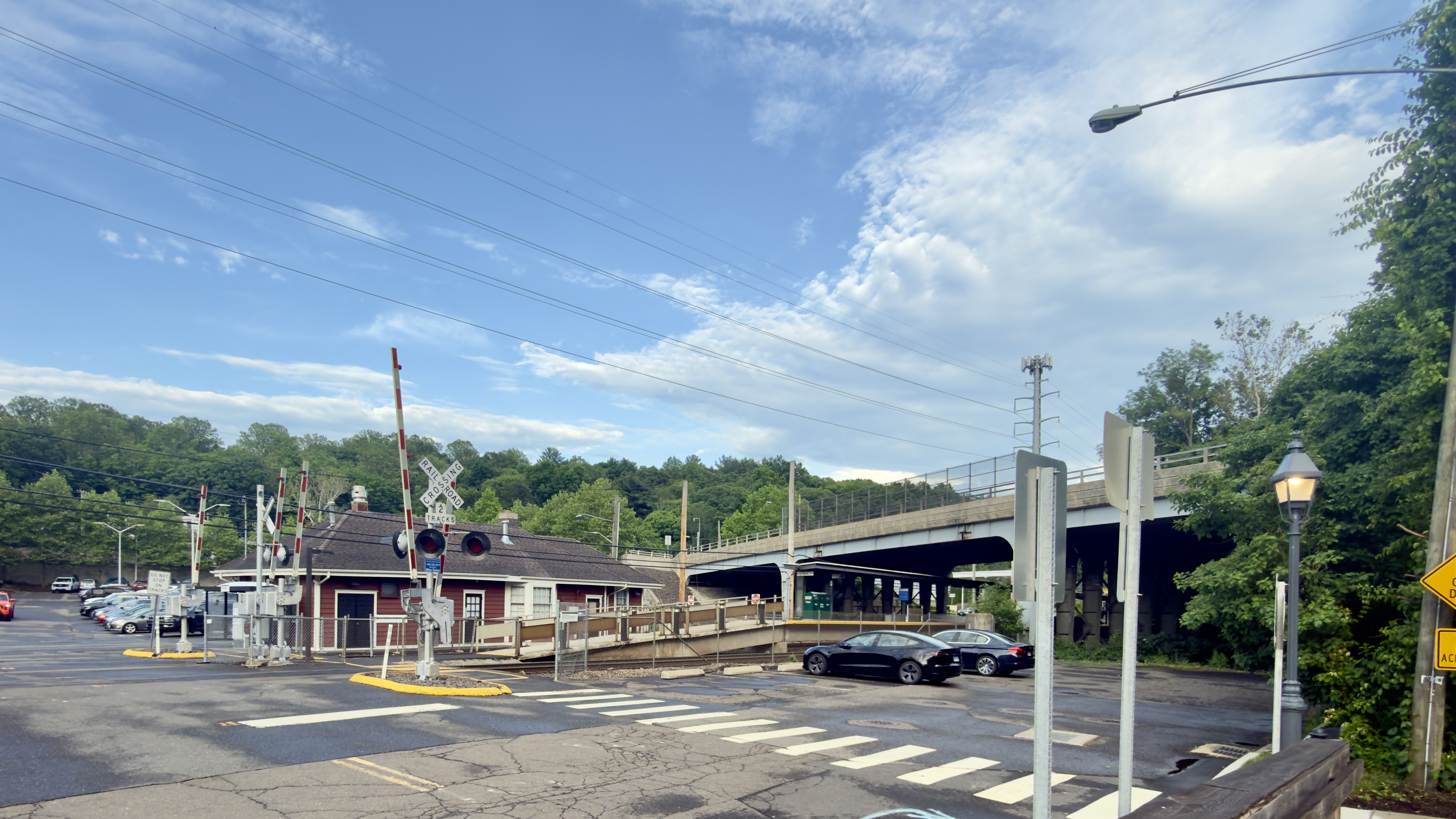
- Station house and platform, view from northwest

General information
- Location: 7 Station Road; Wilton, Connecticut
- Coordinates: 41.1959°N 73.4321°W
- Owner: ConnDOT
- Operator: ConnDOT and Metro-North Railroad
- Platforms: 1 island platform
- Tracks: 2
- Connections: Norwalk Transit District: Route 7 Link

Construction
- Parking: 212 spaces
- Accessible: yes

Other information
- Fare zone: 41

Passengers
- 2018: 240 daily boardings

Services
| Preceding station | Metro-North Railroad | Following station |
|---|---|---|
| Merritt 7 toward South Norwalk, Stamford or Grand Central | Danbury Branch | Cannondale toward Danbury |
Former services
| Preceding station | New York, New Haven and Hartford Railroad | Following station |
|---|---|---|
| Norwalk and South Norwalk Terminus | Pittsfield Branch | Cannondale toward Pittsfield |
Location

Wilton station is a commuter rail station on the Danbury Branch of the Metro-North Railroad's New Haven Line, located in Wilton, Connecticut. The station first opened in 1852 and is the most used station on the Danbury Branch by weekday passengers.

== History ==
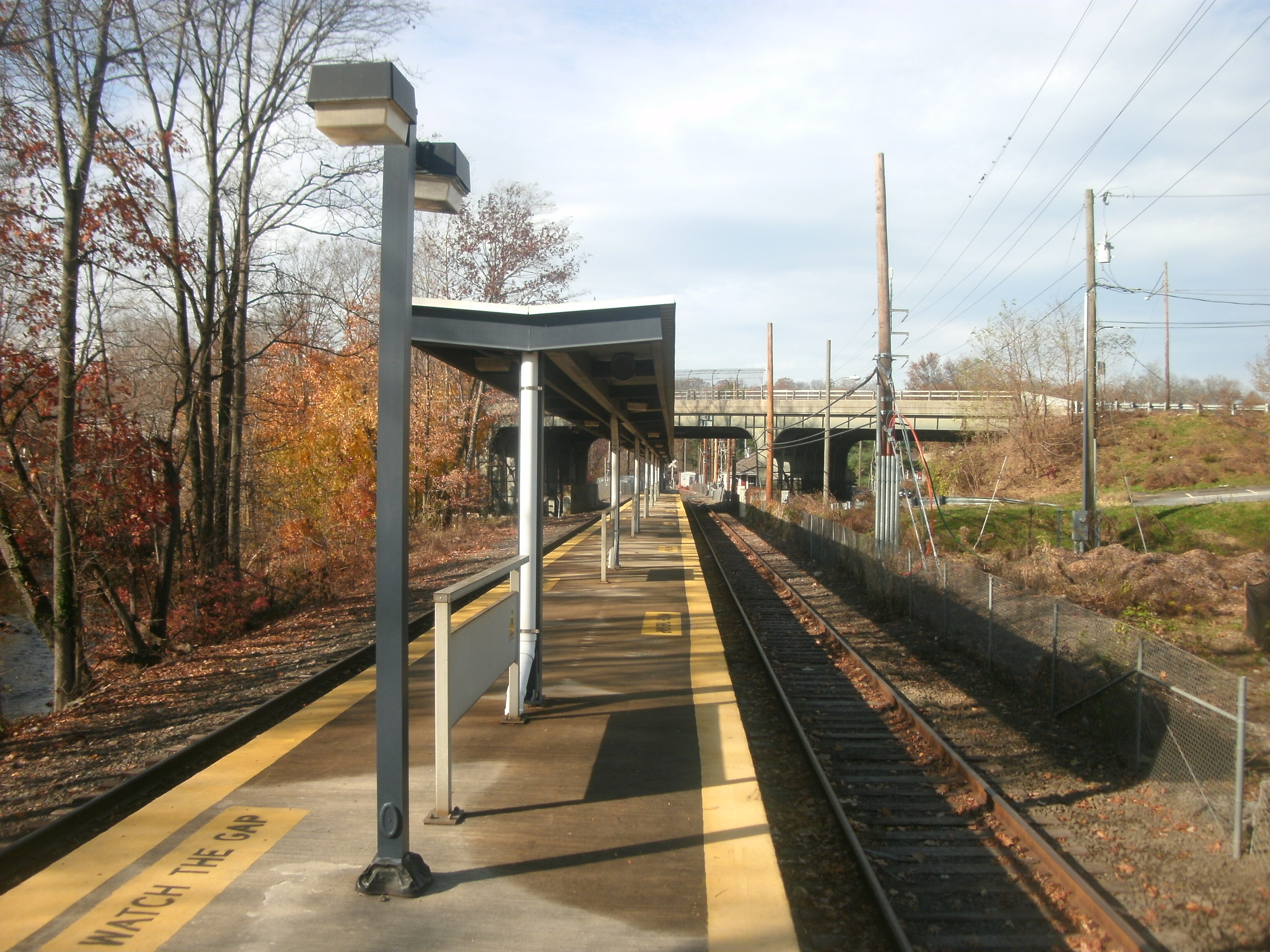
The station platform in 2011

Wilton station opened in 1852 alongside Cannondale station, Georgetown station, and Kent station on the Danbury and Norwalk Railroad. The original station house was replaced in 1939 by the current one. The original station was moved north to the nearby property of Charles Dana in 1941. Following the death of Dana in 1968, the town acquired the Dana property. However, the original station had fallen into advanced disrepair, and after almost being demolished in 1974, the original station house was moved to Lambert Corners in 1978. (Note: Lambert Corners is a property in Wilton owned by the Wilton Historical Society, where endangered historic buildings are sometimes relocated to in order to escape demolition or deterioration.) where it remains today.

On May 21, 2014, both businesses housed inside of the station house closed unexpectedly. During the COVID-19 pandemic, ridership at Wilton station dropped significantly, prompting a decreased frequency of trains stopping at Wilton. Ridership significantly rebounded by 2024, and the schedule has since been restored.

== Station layout ==
The station has one four-car-long high-level Island platform serving trains in both directions. On both the north and south end of the platform, the two tracks merge into a single track.

The station has 212 free public parking spaces, 105 owned by the state and all managed by the Town of Wilton. The station is owned and operated by the Connecticut Department of Transportation (ConnDOT), but Metro-North is responsible for trash and snow removal as well as platform lighting.
