= Kent Road station =

Metro-North Railroad station in Connecticut

Kent Road
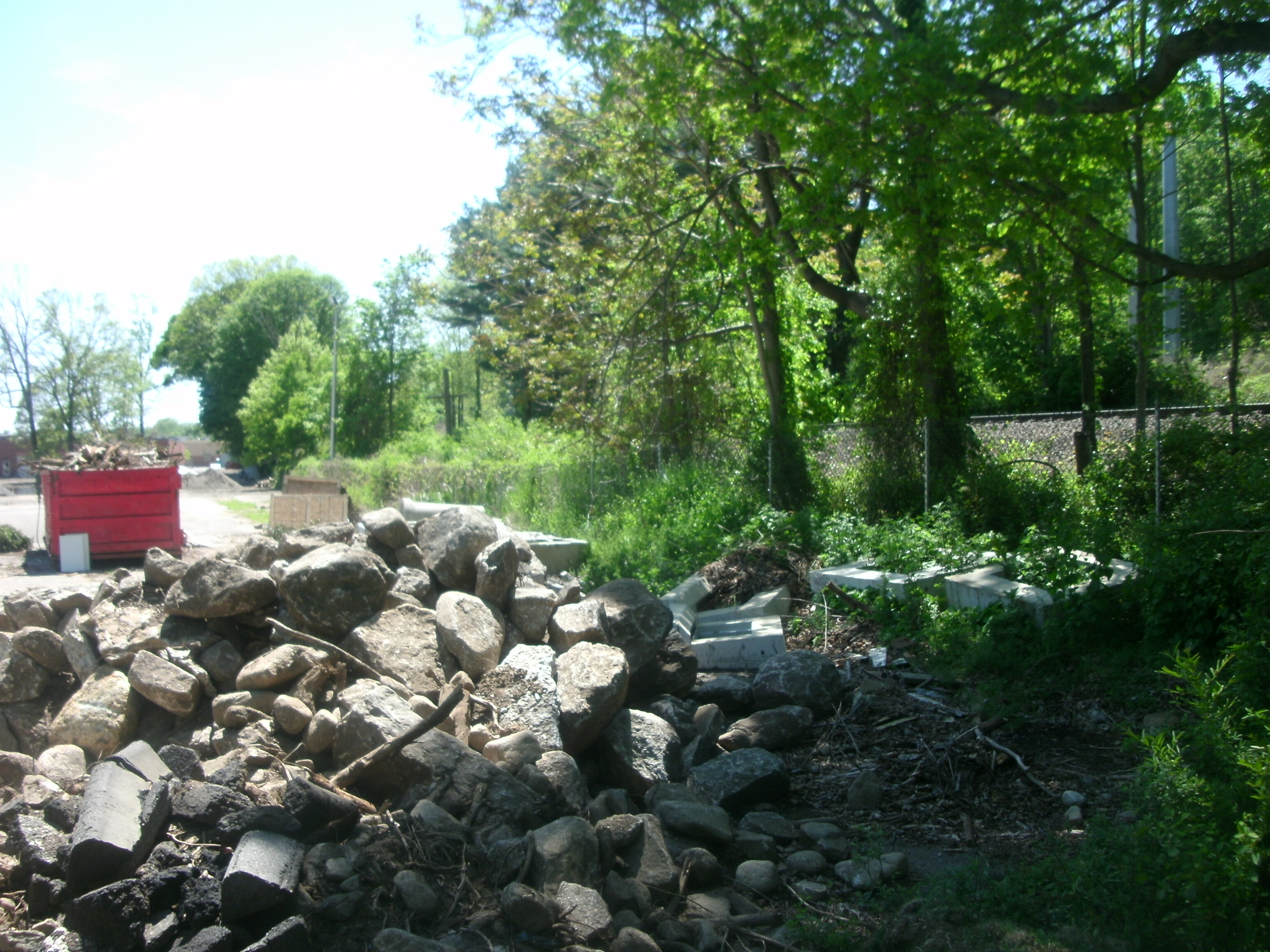
- The former Kent Road station site in 2012

General information
- Location: 11 Kent Road, Wilton, Connecticut
- Coordinates: 41.163564°N 73.420262°W
- Line: Danbury Branch
- Platforms: 1 low level side platform
- Tracks: 1

History
- Opened: 1852, January 12, 1976
- Closed: ca. 1971, January 16, 1994
- Former names: Kent (1852–1886); South Wilton (1886–1971); Hopkins (1933–1945)

Passengers
- 1994: 15

Services
Preceding station	Metro-North Railroad	Following station
Merritt 7 toward South Norwalk, Stamford or Grand Central	Danbury Branch	Wilton toward Danbury
Location

Kent Road station was a commuter rail stop on the Danbury Branch of the Metro-North Railroad's New Haven Line. It was located near the border between Wilton and Norwalk, south of a grade crossing with Kent Road in Wilton, Connecticut. It opened in 1976 and closed in 1994. A previous station on the site, South Wilton, closed in 1971.

== History ==
=== Original station ===
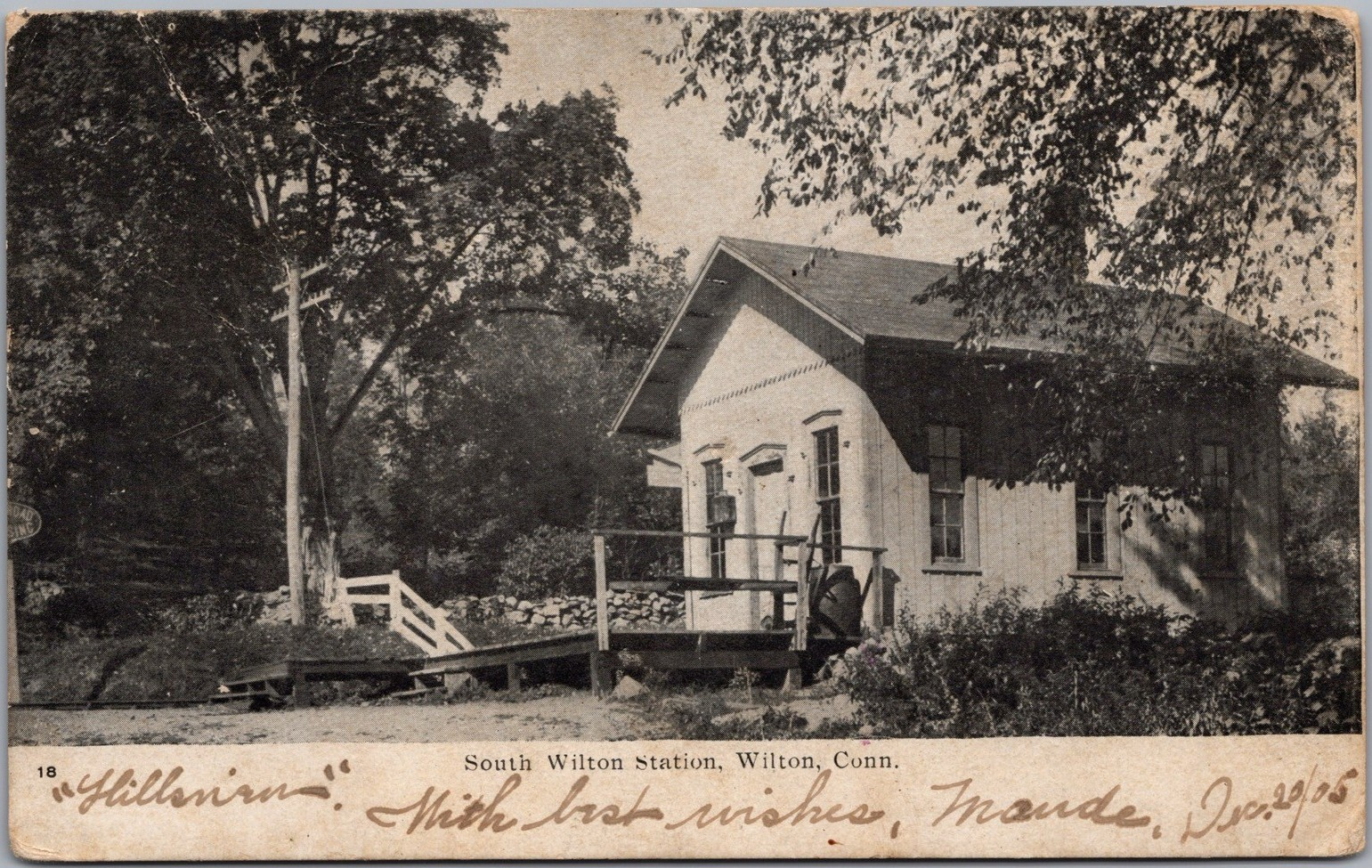
1900s postcard of South Wilton station

The original station located at the site was located on the north side of Kent Road and was originally called Kent. Kent was opened in 1852 by the Danbury and Norwalk Railroad. The name of the station was changed to South Wilton when the railroad was leased by the Housatonic Railroad in 1886, possibly to distinguish it from the HRR's already existing station in the town of Kent. The station served the nearby Kensett Sanitarium, which burned down in 1912. The station was also known as Hopkins – possibly a reference to Fred Hopkins, who was the station agent at Wilton station for many years.

The station was closed by Penn Central on February 1, 1971. The station was demolished not long afterwards.

=== Replacement station ===
The station was replaced on January 12, 1976, when a new station called Kent Road was opened on the south side of Kent Road by Penn Central to serve Perkin-Elmer's headquarters in Wilton. However, ridership at the station gradually decreased over time and by 1985, the station served just a dozen daily riders. Metro-North discontinued service at Kent Road on January 16, 1994. ConnDOT director of rail operations Dick Rathburn cited the station's lack of parking, poor geographic location, dwindling ridership, and potential obsoleteness with the newly renovated Merritt 7 station located just 1 mile south. Rathburn even claimed that the station "Was only put up as a temporary measure to provide transportation for Perkin-Elmer employees." The station consisted of a low-level side platform and a small shelter, which are no longer extant.
