= Georgetown station (Connecticut) =

Former railway station in Georgetown, Connecticut

Georgetown
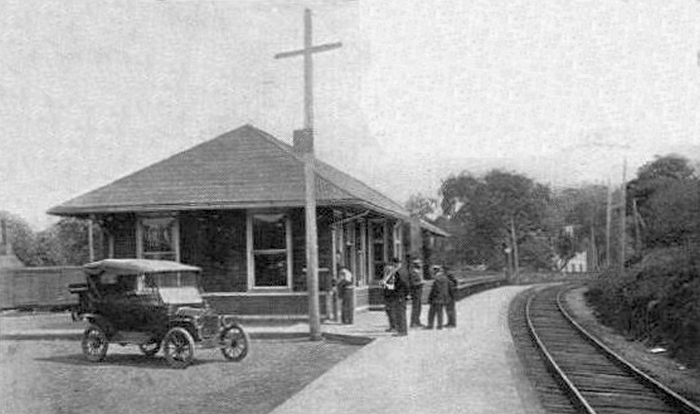
- Georgetown station on a 1919 postcard

General information
- Coordinates: 41.2577°N 73.4304°W
- Tracks: 1

History
- Opened: 1852
- Closed: 1970

Former services
Preceding station	New York, New Haven and Hartford Railroad	Following station
Cannondale toward Norwalk and South Norwalk	Pittsfield Branch	Branchville toward Pittsfield
Location

Georgetown station is a former commuter rail station on the Danbury Division of the New York, New Haven, and Hartford Railroad, located in Georgetown, Connecticut. It was in service from 1852 to 1970. A new station at Georgetown has been proposed.

== History ==
Georgetown station was opened in 1852 on the Danbury and Norwalk Railroad. The station was located on the east side of the single track in the section of Georgetown that lies within the town of Wilton. In 1899, the original depot caught fire. The damage to the depot was so severe that about 40 feet of the large depot had to be demolished, resulting in separated freight and passenger station buildings. The station building was home to a grocery store and a post office. A new station was opened in late 1908. The station would continue to serve passengers until its closure by the Penn Central in 1970.

There is possibility of a new Georgetown station in the future. A future plan by ConnDOT, which would include re-electrification of the Danbury Branch, also includes the possibility of a new Georgetown station.
