= Merritt 7 station =

Metro-North Railroad station in Connecticut

Merritt 7
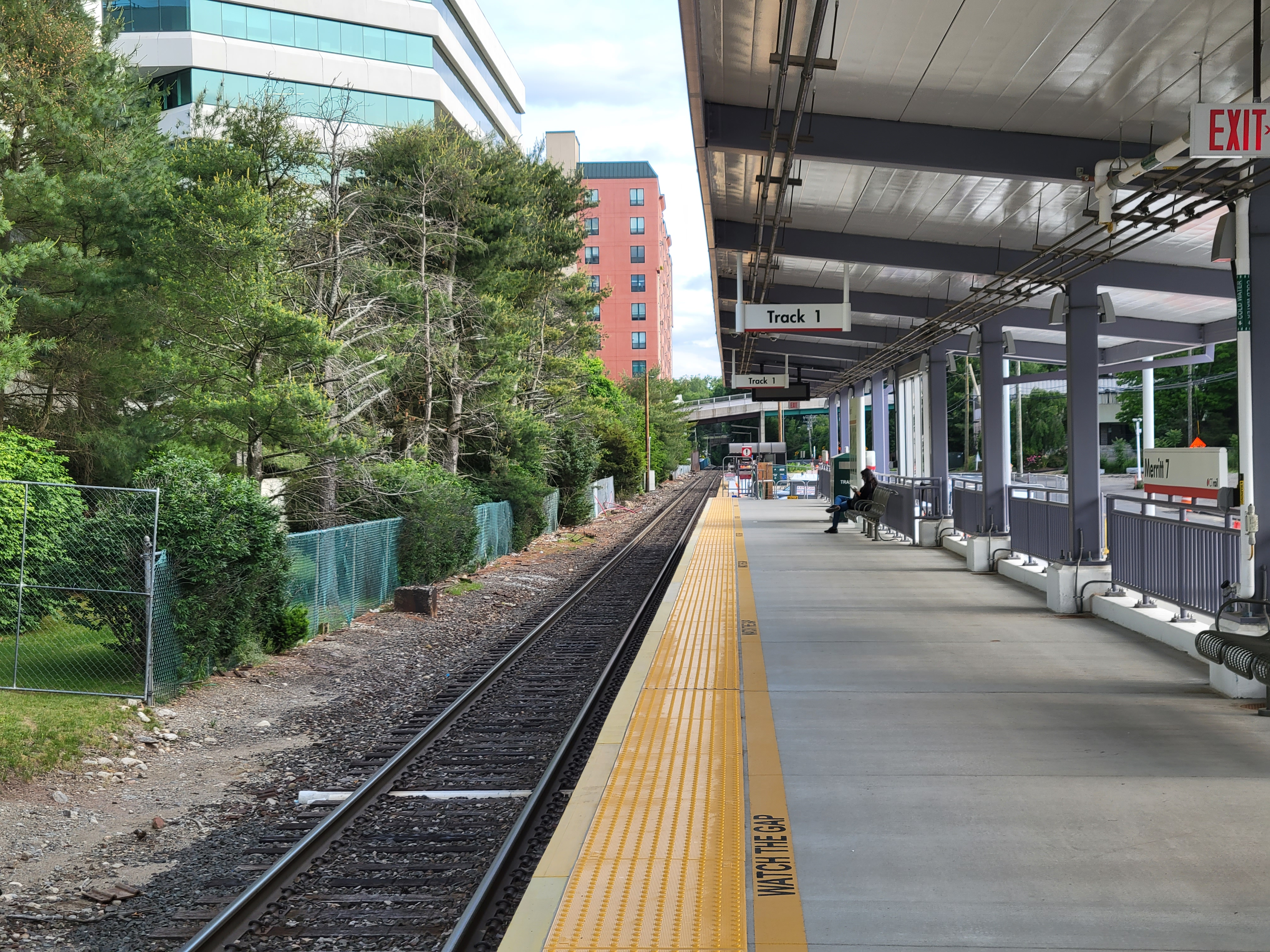
- View of the new platform opened in June 2023

General information
- Location: Glover Avenue; Norwalk, Connecticut
- Coordinates: 41.14803°N 73.42768°W
- Owner: Connecticut Department of Transportation
- Operator: Connecticut Department of Transportation
- Platforms: 1 side platform
- Tracks: 1
- Connections: Norwalk Transit District: Route 7 Link

Construction
- Parking: 105 spaces
- Accessible: Yes

Other information
- Fare zone: 41

History
- Opened: July 29, 1985
- Rebuilt: September 2020–June 7, 2023

Passengers
- 2018: 181 daily boardings

Services
Preceding station	Metro-North Railroad	Following station
South Norwalk Terminus	Danbury Branch	Wilton toward Danbury
South Norwalk weekday service toward Stamford or Grand Central	Danbury Branch	Wilton toward Danbury
Location

Merritt 7 station is a commuter rail stop on the Danbury Branch of the Metro-North Railroad's New Haven Line, located in Norwalk, Connecticut. Merritt 7 is named after an adjacent business park based near the interchange of the Merritt Parkway and Route 7.

== History ==
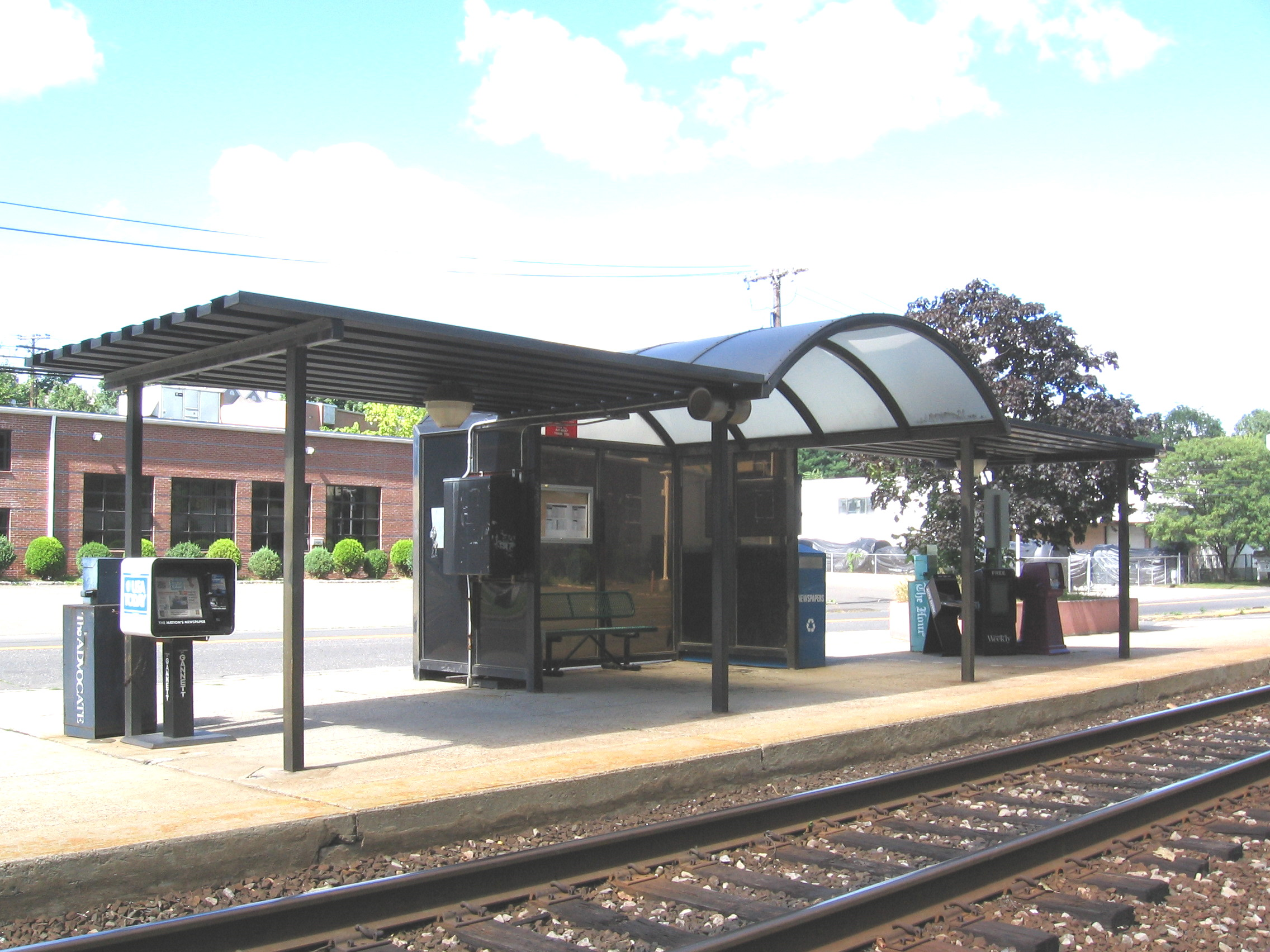
The former station (2007); removed in 2023

The Merritt 7 corporate park built the station while separating the station from building entrances by a fence to make the complex transit adjacent but not transit-oriented. The station was opened on July 29, 1985, by Metro-North. At the time of its opening, it was the only privately built rail station in Connecticut. Construction of the station cost $750,000.

The station was rebuilt with a 510-foot (160 m) six-car-long high-level platform on the west side of the tracks, slightly north of the former station. The new station has a full-length canopy and an accessible pedestrian overpass with elevators. The state authorized funding for the project in 2017. Bidding took place in April–June 2020; construction began that September. The new platform opened on June 7, 2023, but the opening of the footbridge over the tracks to the office park was delayed due to supply chain issues with glass panels, which opened on January 12, 2024.

== Station layout ==
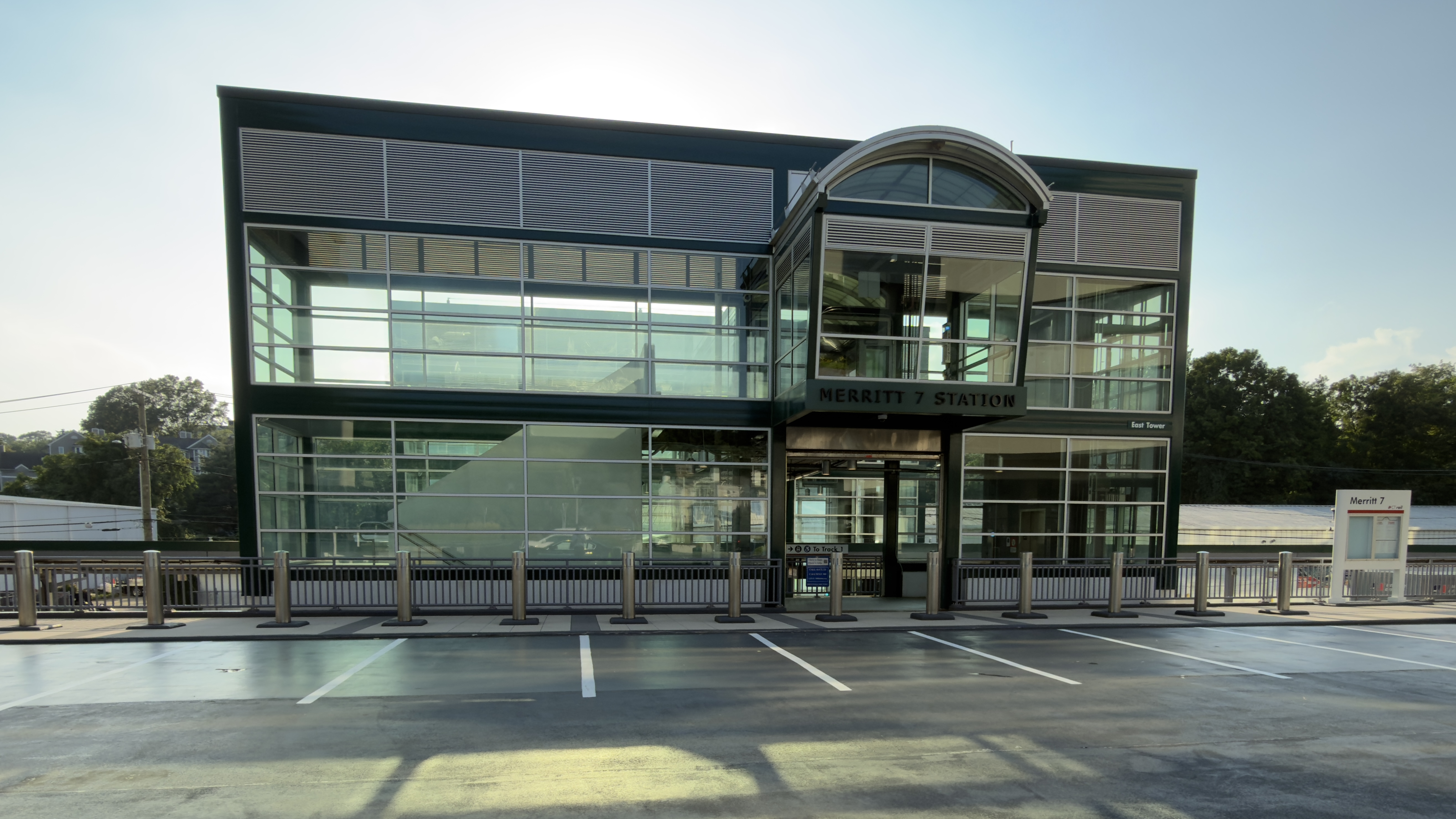
East entrance to the new station

The station has one high-level 6-car long side platform to the west of the single track. It is owned and operated by the Connecticut Department of Transportation (ConnDOT). The station also has 105 free public parking spaces and two EV charging stations, all of which are managed by the state.
