= SoNo Switch Tower =

Coordinates: 41°5′57″N 73°25′6.5″W

SoNo Switch Tower Museum
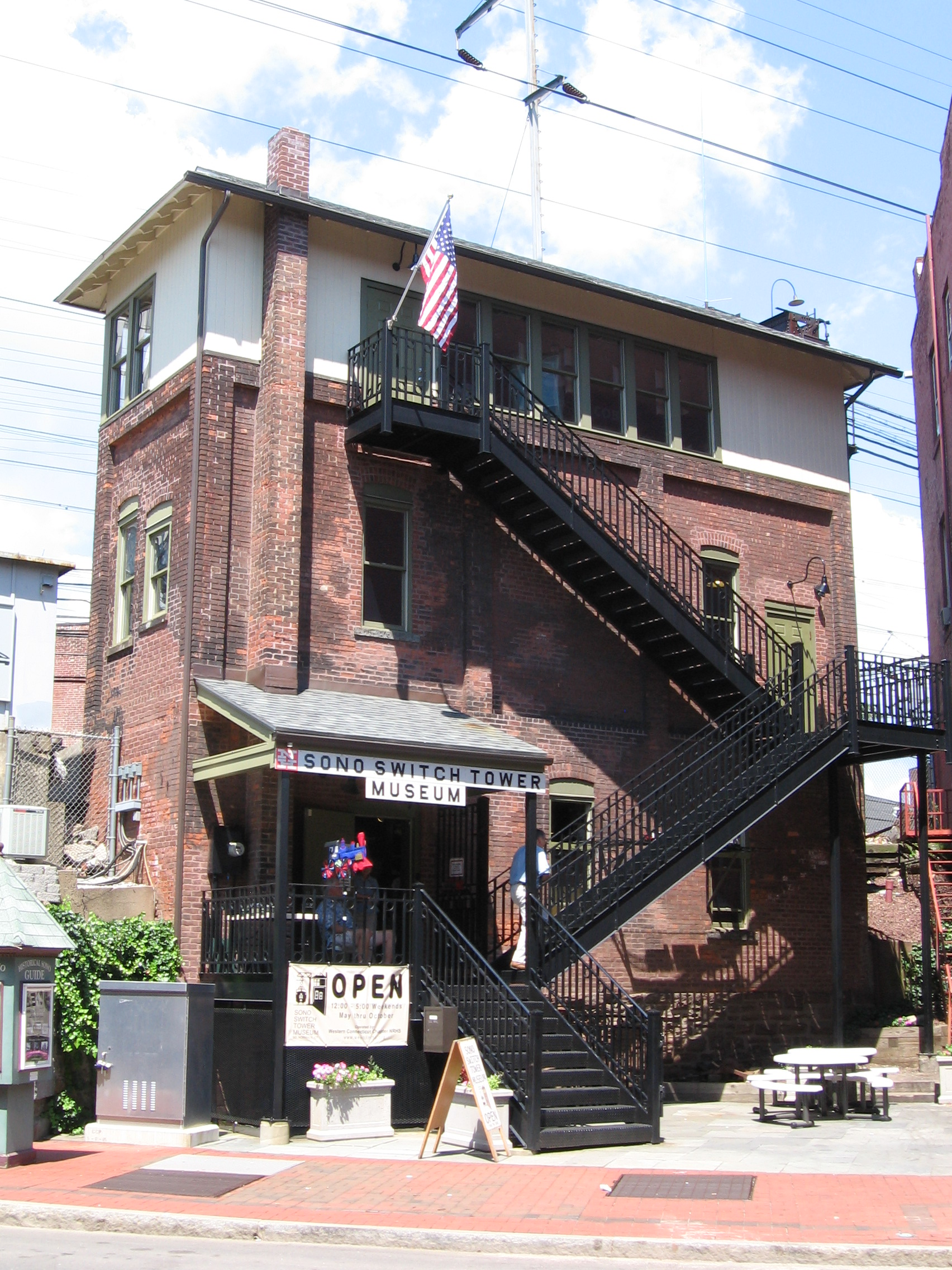
- The museum in 2007
- Location: Norwalk, Connecticut
- Type: Railroad museum
- Website: Official website

SoNo Switch Tower is a preserved switch tower in Norwalk, Connecticut, in the United States. It was originally constructed in 1896 by the New York, New Haven and Hartford Railroad (The New Haven) to control switches at the junction between the New Haven Line and the Danbury Branch. The tower operated until 1986, when it was decommissioned by Metro-North Railroad following the centralizing of dispatching at Grand Central Terminal in New York City. It has been preserved as a museum.

The museum includes a webcam, run by VirtualRailfan, allowing viewers to watch trains passing the tower on the Northeast Corridor; it has been noted for its popularity among railfans online.
