= Danbury Branch =

Metro-North Railroad branch in Connecticut

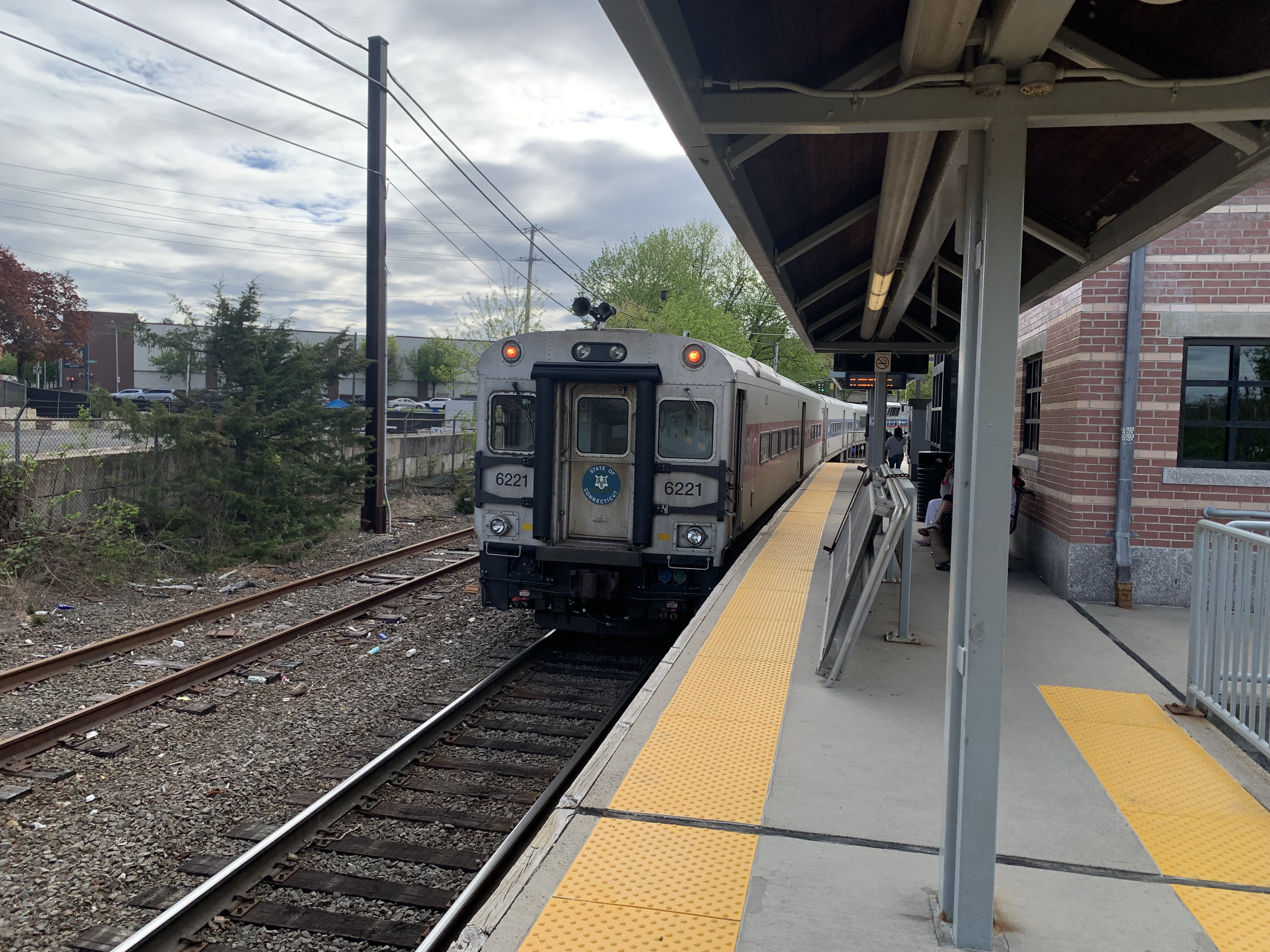
- A train at the station in Danbury, Connecticut

Overview
- Status: Operating
- Owner: Connecticut DOT
- Locale: Norwalk, CT to Danbury, CT
- Termini: Grand Central (weekday service) Stamford (weekday service) South Norwalk; Danbury
- Stations: 8

Service
- Type: Commuter rail
- System: Metro-North Railroad
- Operator(s): Metro-North (passenger 1983–present); PW (freight 1993 – present); Housatonic (freight 1983–present)
- Rolling stock: Siemens SC-42DM; GE Genesis P32AC-DM; Brookville BL20GH; Shoreliner coaches

Technical
- Line length: 23.9 mi (38.46 km)
- Character: Commuter rail / Branch line
- Track gauge: 4 ft 8 1/2 in (1,435 mm) standard gauge
- Electrification: None (electrified 1925–1961)
Route map
Danbury Branch highlighted in red (full weekday route)

The Danbury Branch is a 23.9-mile (38 km) long branch line of the Metro-North Railroad's New Haven Line in the U.S. state of Connecticut, running from downtown Norwalk north to Danbury. All trains along the branch make stops at the line's 8 stations, with many weekday Danbury trains continuing along the New Haven Line to and from Stamford and New York City, eliminating the need to transfer at South Norwalk. It opened in 1852 as the Danbury and Norwalk Railroad. Until the early 1970s, passenger service continued north from Danbury to Canaan, Connecticut, and Pittsfield, Massachusetts. Metro-North took over operation of the line from Conrail in 1983, and the modern-day branch is mostly single-tracked.

== History ==
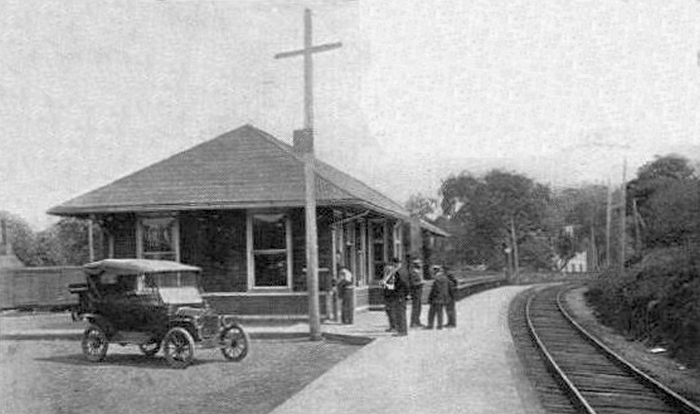
Original Georgetown station, circa 1919

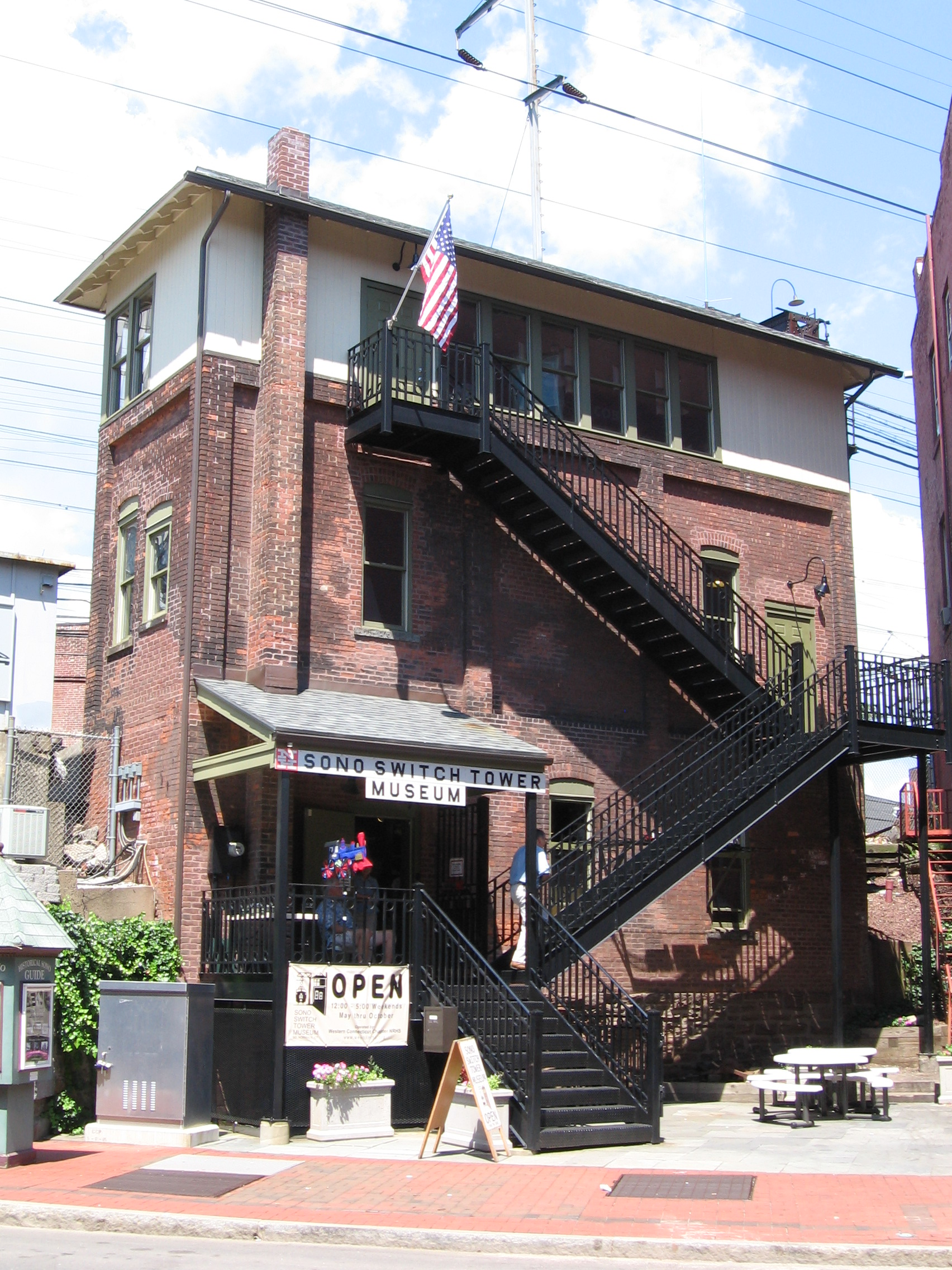
The SoNo Switch Tower Museum in Norwalk

The Danbury and Norwalk Railroad began operating its line from Norwalk north to Danbury on February 22, 1852. In July 1872 a branch from the mainline at Bethel northeast to Hawleyville opened. At Hawleyville, the branch connected to the Housatonic Railroad, continuing north into Massachusetts. Also at Hawleyville, connections with the Shepaug Railroad to Litchfield were possible.

Starting on May 1, 1874, that connection was supplemented by the New York, Housatonic and Northern Railroad, running from Danbury northeast to the Housatonic. In 1881 the New York and New England Railroad was completed, giving another connection at Danbury and at Hawleyville. A short branch from Branchville on the mainline west to Ridgefield opened July 1, 1870. In July 1882 an extension was built in Norwalk to docks at Wilson Point. The Housatonic Railroad leased the D&N on July 21, 1887; and soon after, the New York, New Haven and Hartford Railroad leased the Housatonic.

Long-distance passenger service operated on the line. The Berkshire ran on the line from Grand Central to Danbury, to Pittsfield, Massachusetts. Many railroad bridges along the Danbury Branch were damaged or destroyed in the 1955 Norwalk river flood. The NYNH&H merged into Penn Central in 1969. On January 1, 1971, the State of Connecticut leased the Danbury Branch from Penn Central. The last passenger train from Danbury north to Pittsfield, Massachusetts ran in April 1971, the day before Amtrak assumed passenger operations. From 1976 until 1983, freight and passenger service on the line was provided by the Consolidated Rail Corporation (Conrail) under a contract with Connecticut. In 1983 the newly formed Metro-North Commuter Railroad took over operation of passenger service along the line. Conrail continued to provide freight service on the line until 1993. The Providence and Worcester Railroad now provides freight service along the Danbury Branch.

Upon renovation of the Merritt 7 station, Metro-North ceased stops at Kent Road on January 16, 1994, and instead provided service via shuttle bus to Merritt 7 for local employers. By the time of its closing, fewer than 15 passengers used the station daily.

=== Electrification ===
The Danbury Line operated electric-powered trains beginning in 1925. The catenary system on the Danbury Line was removed in 1961 when diesel-powered locomotives began service on the line. Steel posts that once carried the overhead catenary system could still be seen along the line until cut down in 2023. As of 2022, the Connecticut Department of Transportation was studying the feasibility of installing catenary wire on the Danbury Branch.

=== Railway museums ===
The Switchtower Museum in South Norwalk describes to visitors how railroad employees would switch the tracks for trains continuing on the Danbury branch line, then switch them back for trains travelling along the New Haven main line.

The Danbury Railway Museum is located in the former Union Station of the D&N and NY&NE in Danbury. It lies just north of the current Danbury Metro-North station. At the museum are examples of rolling stock retired from service as well as an indoor display of model trains.

== Plans ==
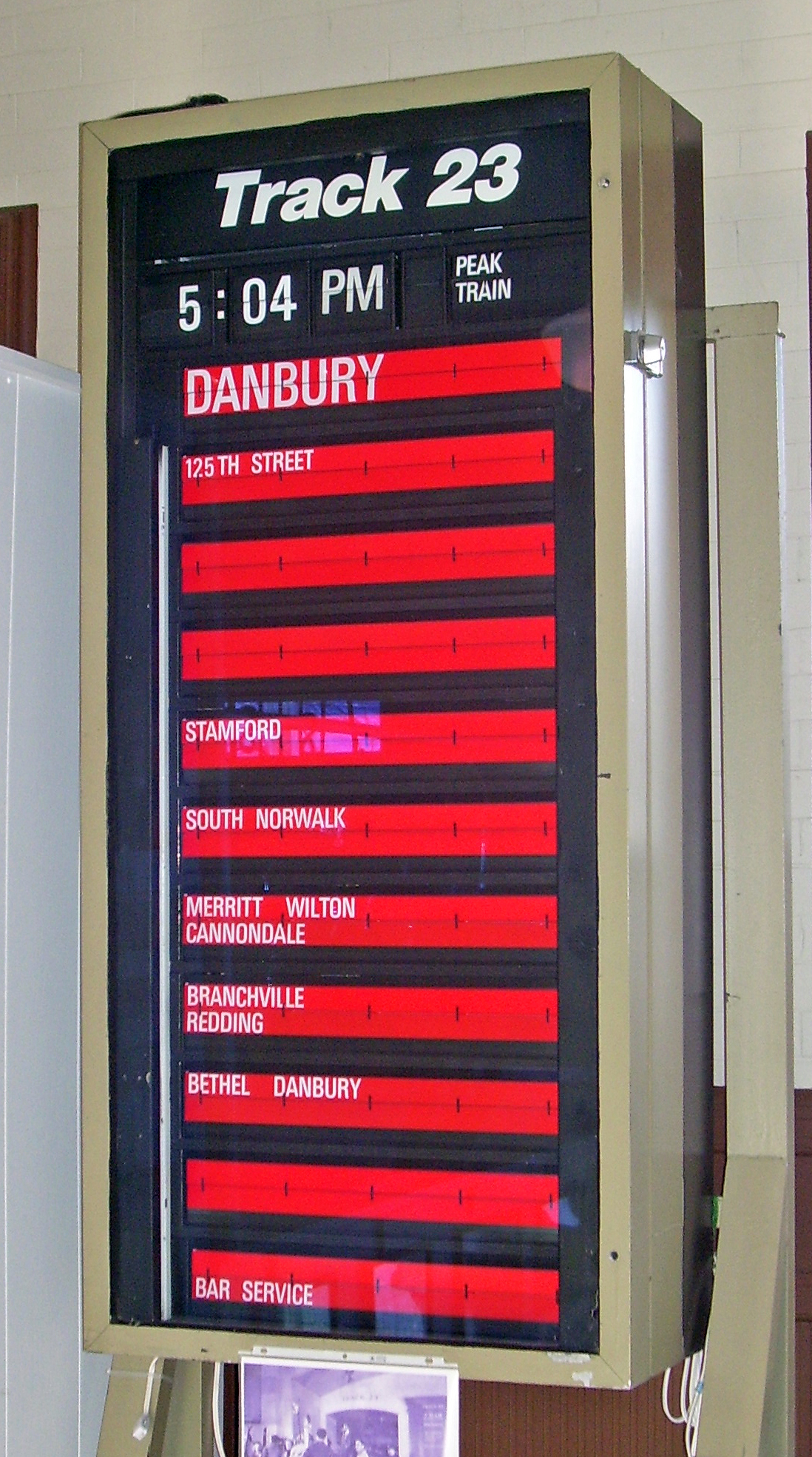
Former Solari display for the branch used at Grand Central Terminal; now at the Danbury Railway Museum.

There have been proposals to re-electrify the Danbury Branch, along with a plan to extend service north from Danbury to New Milford.

In connection with the planned redevelopment of the Gilbert & Bennett Wire Mill as a residential neighborhood, reopening a Georgetown station between the Cannondale and Branchville stations has been approved, though not yet scheduled or funded. The previous station was abandoned in the 1970s due to low ridership.

Over $60 million was allocated to the Danbury Branch, approximately half from the economic stimulus package of 2009, to improve current stations, build siding tracks, and install a new signal system. Connecticut Gov. M. Jodi Rell held a press conference with local politicians at the Cannondale station on July 28, 2009, to announce that construction was scheduled to start in late 2009 and finish in 2011. The new signal system finally began operation in 2013, but extensive work was still ongoing in 2014 because of unresolved problems with the drop gates at grade crossings.

In fall 2012, the focus of the plan was only on improving the corridor as far as Danbury, with no extension.

In May 2015, Governor Dannel Malloy's five-year plan for transportation improvements called "Let's Go CT" only mentioned one point for the Danbury Branch. This is a new small rail yard called the Danbury Line Dock Yard Improvements. This area in South Norwalk will include electrification of the southern end of the branch. This was to enable work to commence on the Walk Bridge. However, at the same time a 30-year plan was published that does envision electrification of the Danbury Branch, extending service to New Milford and electrifying that extension. Electrification of the portion to Danbury would cost $400 million; the extension to New Milford would cost $450 million, and the electrification of the extension would cost $540 million.

On February 1, 2017, the Connecticut State Bond Commission authorized $21 million in borrowing for upgrades at the Merritt 7 station as well as for the addition of a station on the New Haven Line. The Merritt 7 station would have a footbridge added, a raised platform, and an expanded shelter.

In 2018 plans to reopen the long-closed Wall Street station were under consideration in wake of new housing developments in Norwalk Center. In 2022 the Connecticut Department of Transportation released the final report for a study that looked at the feasibility of reopening the station. In the end that study concluded that, "a station stop near Wall Street is not recommended at this time."

== Stations ==
West of South Norwalk, the New Haven Line continues southwest to Grand Central Terminal and northeast to Union Station in New Haven.

All trains stop at all eight stations on the branch. The trip from Danbury to South Norwalk currently (2018) takes about 54 minutes. All peak trains and some off-peak run from Danbury to Stamford on weekdays, and limited service runs from Danbury to Grand Central Terminal as well. Limited through service from Danbury to Grand Central takes about 2 hours. Two weekday trains serve the intermediate stations (Rowayton, Darien, and Noroton Heights) in peak direction.

The following services that connect to the Danbury Branch are Amtrak, Metro-North Railroad, Norwalk Transit District, and HARTransit.

Weekday service only
Closed stations

State	Zone	Location	Station	Miles (km) from GCT	Date opened	Date closed	Connections / notes
NY	1	Manhattan	Grand Central Terminal	0.0 (0)	October 6, 1871		Metro-North Railroad: ■ Harlem Line, ■ Hudson Line; Long Island Rail Road (at Grand Central Madison); NYC Subway: (at Grand Central–42nd Street); NYCT Bus, MTA Bus
NY	1	Manhattan	Harlem–125th Street	4.2 (6.8)	October 25, 1897		Metro-North Railroad: ■ Harlem Line, ■ Hudson Line; NYC Subway: (at 125th Street); NYCT Bus
CT	16	Stamford	Stamford; Transportation Center	33.0 (53.1)	December 25, 1848		Amtrak: Acela, Northeast Regional, Vermonter; Metro-North Railroad: ■ New Haven Line, ■ New Canaan Branch; CT Rail: Shore Line East (limited service); CTtransit Stamford, UConn Stamford Shuttle; Intercity bus: Greyhound, Peter Pan
CT	16	Darien	Noroton Heights	36.2 (58.3)			CTtransit Stamford
CT	16	Darien	Darien	37.7 (60.7)	December 25, 1848		CTtransit Stamford
CT	16	Norwalk	Rowayton	39.2 (63.1)			Norwalk Transit District
CT	17	Norwalk	South Norwalk	41.0 (66.0)			Metro-North Railroad: ■ New Haven Line; Norwalk Transit District
CT	41	Norwalk	Wall Street		1860	1956	
CT	41	Norwalk	Merritt 7	45.0 (72.4)	1985		HARTransit, Norwalk Transit District
CT	41	Wilton	Kent Road		January 12, 1976	January 16, 1994	
CT	41	Wilton	Wilton	48.5 (78.1)	1852		HARTransit, Norwalk Transit District
CT	41	Wilton	Cannondale	50.2 (80.8)	1852		HARTransit
CT	41	Wilton	Georgetown			1970s	
CT	42	Ridgefield	Branchville	54.0 (86.9)	1852		HARTransit
CT	42	Redding	Sanford		1852	1938	
CT	42	Redding	Redding	58.7 (94.5)	1852		HARTransit
CT	42	Bethel	Bethel	62.2 (100.1)	1852		HARTransit
CT	42	Danbury	Danbury	64.9 (104.4)	1852		HARTransit

== Rolling stock ==
Unlike the New Haven main line or the New Canaan Branch, the Danbury Branch is not electrified, and uses diesel locomotives in push-pull operation. Usually, the diesels push trains toward Grand Central Terminal, and pull toward Danbury. All of the passenger cars used are Shoreliner series cars, powered by Siemens SC-42DM, GE P32AC-DM Genesis, Brookville BL20GH, or EMD GP40-3H locomotives.

In August 2023, CTDOT approved a contract with Alstom for 60 single-level passenger cars. The cars will replace the existing Shoreliner coach fleet on the Waterbury Branch and the Danbury Branch, as well as Mafersa coaches on the Hartford Line. Deliveries are expected to begin in 2026.

== Sources ==
- Jenkins, Stephen (1912). The Story of the Bronx from the Purchase Made by the Dutch from the Indians in 1639 to the Present Day. New York, New York: G.P. Putnam's Sons.
