= Danbury station =

Metro-North Railroad station in Connecticut

Danbury
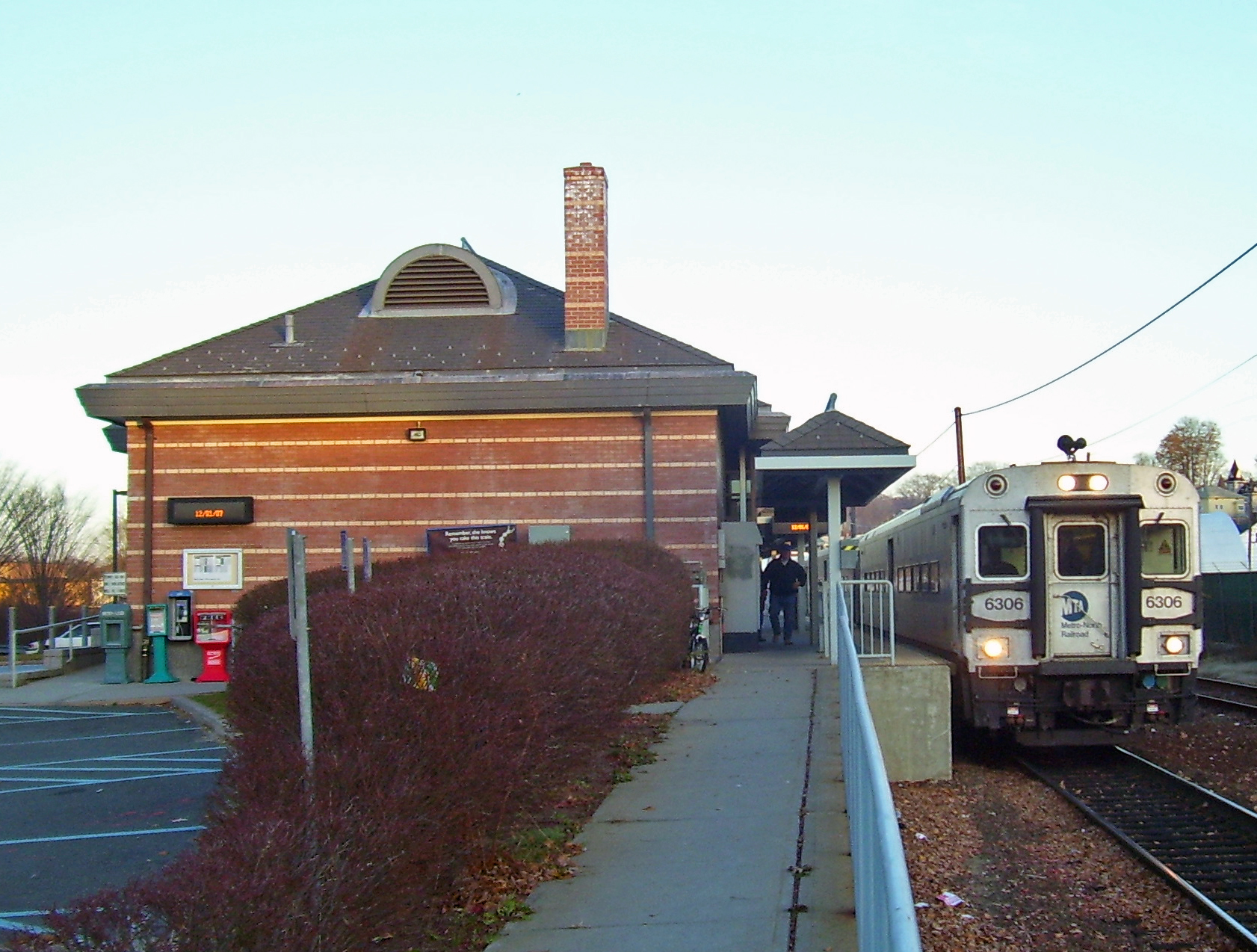
- A northbound train arriving at the station

General information
- Location: 1 Patriot Drive; Danbury, Connecticut
- Coordinates: 41.3963°N 73.4493°W
- Owner: Connecticut Department of Transportation
- Operator: City of Danbury
- Platforms: 1 island platform
- Tracks: 3
- Connections: HARTransit: 2, 7

Construction
- Parking: 647 spaces (147 in surface lot, 550 in public parking garage)
- Accessible: yes

Other information
- Fare zone: 42

History
- Opened: 1852
- Rebuilt: 1996

Passengers
- 2018: 185 daily boardings

Services
Preceding station	Metro-North Railroad	Following station
Bethel toward South Norwalk, Stamford or Grand Central	Danbury Branch	Terminus
Proposed services
Preceding station	Metro-North Railroad	Following station
Bethel toward South Norwalk, Stamford or Grand Central	Danbury Branch	North Danbury toward New Milford
Location

Danbury station is a commuter rail station on the Danbury Branch of the Metro-North Railroad New Haven Line, located in Danbury, Connecticut. The station is the northern terminus of the Danbury Branch.

== Station layout ==
The station has one three-car-long high-level island platform on the north side of the two-track line. A stub siding serves the north side of the platform. The station building contains the passenger waiting area and restrooms. A ticket machine is located on the platform alongside the building.

The surface parking lot at the station has 147 parking spaces, all of which are owned by the state and operated by the Danbury Parking Authority. 134 of the station's parking spots are reserved for permit holders, while the rest are metered spots. The Danbury Parking Authority also operates the Terence E. McNally Patriot Garage, a public 550 car parking garage with EV charging stations, located directly across the street from the train station.

== History ==
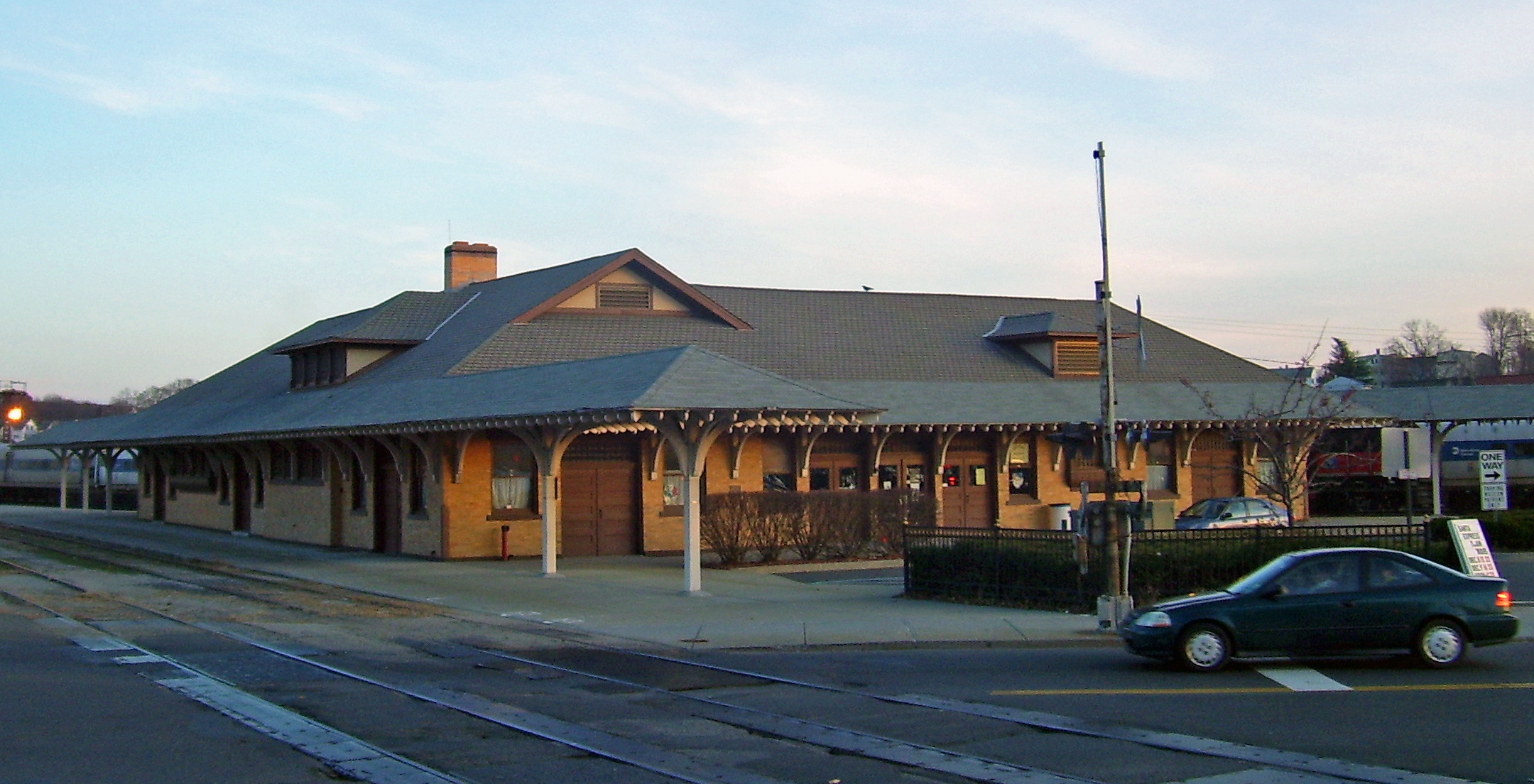
The former Danbury Union Station

The original Danbury station opened in 1852 as the northern terminus of the Danbury and Norwalk Railroad. Throughout the history of the Danbury station, the station has had many different depots. The first depot was opened in 1852 and served as the headquarters for the D&N. The Danbury station would have three different depots over the course of its history from 1852 to today. The 1903-built union station was an important part of Danbury's industrial expansion through the 1900s. However, by 1995, the Union station had fallen into complete disrepair, and was replaced by today's station in 1996.

The present passenger station was built in 1996 by the Connecticut Department of Transportation (ConnDOT) and replaced the older New Haven Railroad station, which now houses the Danbury Railway Museum.

In 2018, the city proposed to relocate the Housatonic Area Regional Transit transfer hub to a parcel across the street from the station, with a footbridge connecting them. The city received $1.6 million in federal funds in 2024 to design the transit center.
