= South Norwalk station =

Railroad station in Connecticut

South Norwalk
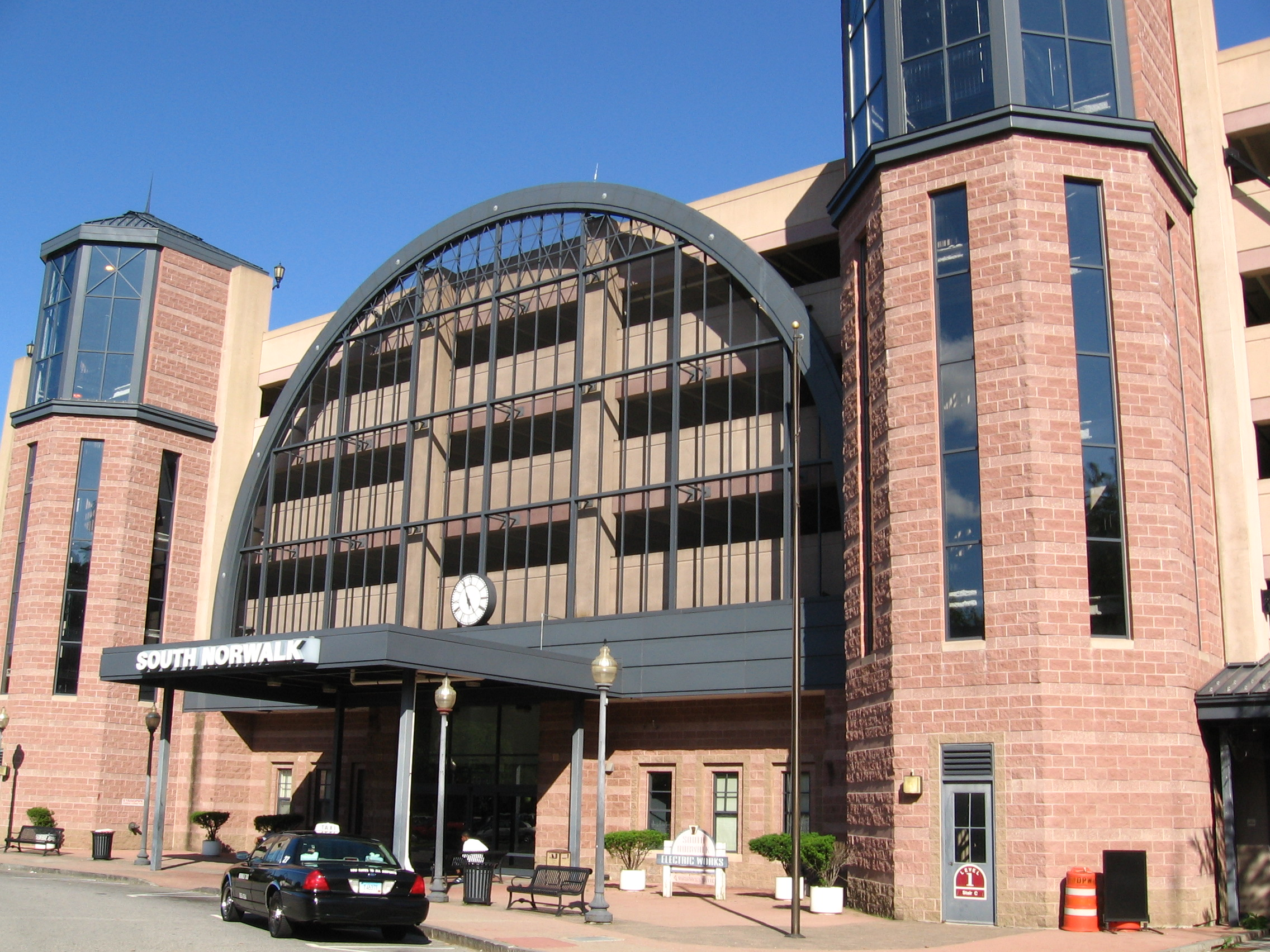
- The west entrance to South Norwalk station

General information
- Location: 29 Monroe Street at 1 Chestnut Street; Norwalk, Connecticut
- Coordinates: 41.09570°N 73.42185°W
- Owner: City of Norwalk
- Line: ConnDOT New Haven Line (Northeast Corridor)
- Platforms: 2 side/island platforms
- Tracks: 6
- Connections: Norwalk Transit District: 10, 11, 12, Evening Shuttle, Sunday Shuttle, Norwalk Commuter Connection - Hospital-Virgin Atlantic, Merrit 7, Westport Road

Construction
- Parking: 800 spaces
- Accessible: Yes

Other information
- Fare zone: 17

Passengers
- 2018: 3,589 daily boardings

Services
Preceding station	Metro-North Railroad	Following station
Rowayton toward Grand Central	New Haven Line	East Norwalk toward New Haven or New Haven State Street
Terminus	Danbury Branch	Merritt 7 toward Danbury
Rowayton weekday service toward Grand Central	Danbury Branch	Merritt 7 toward Danbury
Stamford weekday service Terminus	Danbury Branch	Merritt 7 toward Danbury
Former services
Preceding station	CT Rail	Following station
Stamford One-way operation	Shore Line East suspended in 2020	Bridgeport toward New London
Preceding station	New York, New Haven and Hartford Railroad	Following station
Rowayton toward New York	Main Line	East Norwalk toward New Haven
Terminus	Pittsfield Branch	Wilton toward Pittsfield
Location

South Norwalk station is a commuter rail station in Norwalk, Connecticut, served by the Metro-North Railroad's New Haven Line. It is owned and managed by the Norwalk Transit District. The station is the point where the New Haven Line's Danbury Branch connects to the Northeast Corridor, as well as a peak-hour terminal for some express trains. Just east of the station are the South Norwalk Railroad Bridge and SoNo Switch Tower Museum.

== Station layout ==
The station has two high-level side platforms, each 10 cars long, that serve the outer tracks of the four-track Northeast Corridor. These platforms are used by New Haven Line trains; Amtrak services and some express New Haven Line trains pass through the station without stopping. Two stub tracks terminate at the east end of the station, with the eastern ends of the platforms serving as island platforms. These stub tracks are used for Danbury Branch shuttle trains.

The station has approximately 800 parking spaces, none owned by the state.

The older station building at the eastbound side of the tracks contains a small restaurant. This side features a bus station and taxi stands. The 900-square-foot (84 m^{2}) space is subleased from the New England Fashion Design Association.

== History ==
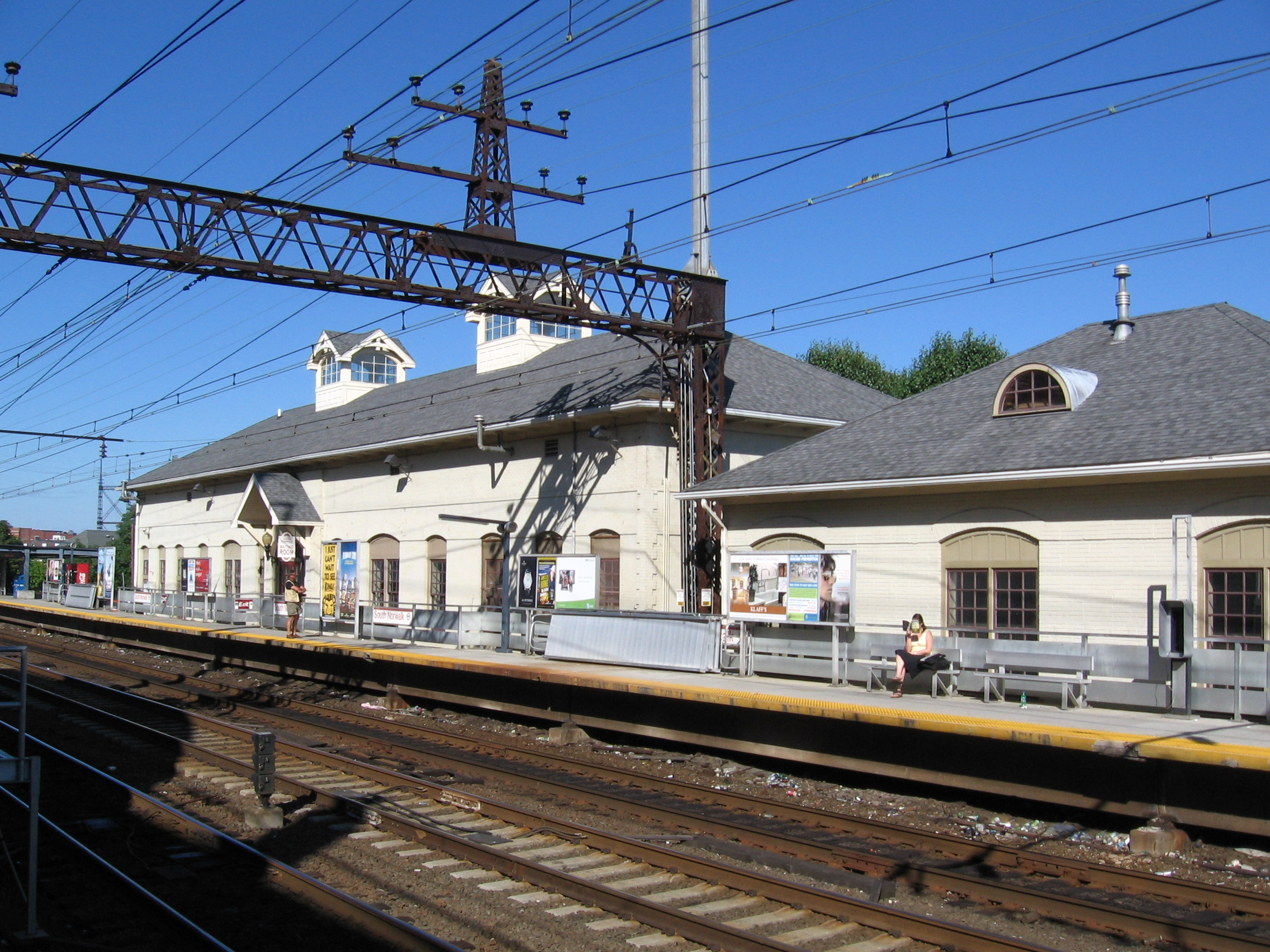
Older building, across the tracks.

Previous stations in the same location were named Norwalk & South Norwalk in timetables of the New York, New Haven and Hartford and successor Penn Central.

The newer, main station building, on the westbound (New York City-bound) side of the tracks, was built in 1994. It has a cafe serving coffee, breakfast sandwiches, and pastries during the morning. The New York side's station building consists of a small waiting area with a gigantic glass arch, overlooking the tracks. To reach either side, passengers go through a pedestrian underpass. The New York side consists of a six-level parking garage with taxi and bus stands. The Norwalk Parking Authority owns the garage along with the New Haven side's parking lot.

The station was the first to receive Wi-Fi service on the New Haven Line in March 2006. The service was provided for one year from a federal grant received from the "One Coast, One Future" initiative designed to help economic development in Stamford, Norwalk and Bridgeport. The grant provides for Wi-Fi service for one year with the expectation that local governments will provide it in the future if they find it valuable enough to do so. Similar service was planned for Stamford and Bridgeport stations in the spring of 2006 but no others. Westport also started providing the service in the spring of 2006.

The City of Norwalk and the Norwalk Transit District let a contract for $238,000 in February 2008 to study possible improvements to the South Norwalk Station with a goal to make it a better "intermodal" facility with improved access for cars, buses, shuttles, pedestrians, and taxis. In late 2008, a renovation project began at the station, involving the installation of power-assist doors, better smoke detectors, emergency lights and energy-efficient lights. Other work included cleaning brickwork, painting, improving signs and moving the automated pay station. improved landscaping and traffic flow. A Norwalk city government official said the changes were meant to make the station more inviting and give visitors a better impression of Norwalk.

In 2010, the rail bridges over Monroe Street adjacent to the station were replaced. As part of the replacement the stairways that used to provide pedestrian access to either platform from Monroe Street were removed along with concealment of the original red sandstone abutments behind steel reinforced concrete facings. In 2012, permanent art was installed in the New Haven lobby and through the connecting tunnel as part of the Norwalk Parking Authority's 'Art in Parking Places' program through a collaboration with the Norwalk Arts Commission and the Norwalk Transit funded by the Federal Transit Administration Public Art Grant.

On June 24, 2002, South Norwalk was added as an eastbound stop for one morning Shore Line East originating at Stamford. All Shore Line East trips serving Stamford were suspended on March 16, 2020. One Shore Line East round trip resumed serving Stamford on October 7, 2024, but did not stop at South Norwalk.
