= Crestwood, Yonkers =

Neighborhood in Yonkers, New York

Coordinates: 40°57′36″N 73°49′27″W

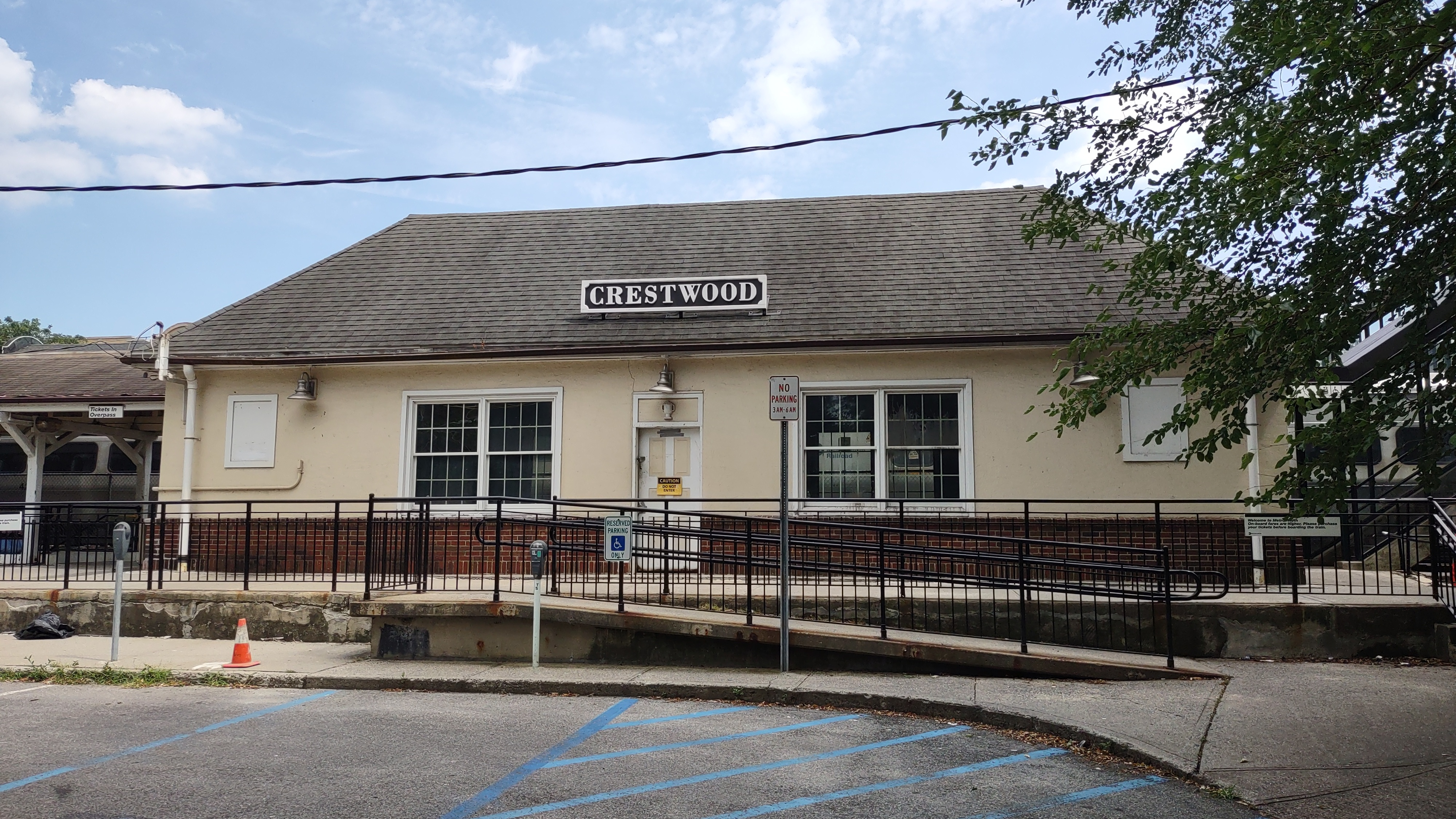
Crestwood Station in 2022, after renovation

Crestwood is a neighborhood in Yonkers, New York. Located in northeastern Yonkers, Crestwood is separated by the Bronx River from the village of Tuckahoe. Because the majority of Crestwood is served by the Tuckahoe post office, many residents identify their location as Tuckahoe or Crestwood, rather than Yonkers. Closer to the Crestwood train station, several grand homes occupy the hilly ground overlooking the river.

The Bronx River serves as the city line between several Westchester communities, dividing the city of Yonkers from the Town of Eastchester, which contains the villages of Tuckahoe and Bronxville.

== Transportation ==
The construction of the Bronx River Parkway had a profound effect on the geography of the Crestwood/Tuckahoe area. When construction began in 1917, the road designers had designed the parkway to "conveniently accommodate the large amount of traffic expected and to display to the traveler the principal interesting features without despoiling it". The Parkway was completed in 1925 and had far-reaching sociological consequences. As part of the right-of-way purchases, lots belonging to Crestwood were bought and cross roads were divided into two. Travelers northbound on the Parkway, after exit 5 to Crestwood, can see the earlier pattern of cross-streets extending from the left-hand side of the roadway across to the right-hand side. A newer off-ramp on the northbound side now leads into what was a roadway that had to be removed to facilitate the construction of the parkway.

The Harlem Line of the Metro-North commuter railroad runs along the Bronx River and has two stops in the Village of Tuckahoe. Since both stations could not be named Tuckahoe, the southern station by the village hall is named Tuckahoe for the area east of the station, and the northern station Crestwood for the Crestwood neighborhood to the west, in Yonkers. This train station was depicted on the cover of The Saturday Evening Post issue for November 16, 1946, in the painting Commuters, by Norman Rockwell.

== Education and Religious Institutions ==
Since 1962 Crestwood has been home to Saint Vladimir’s Orthodox Theological Seminary. The seminary purchased the former Adrian Iselin estate from the Sisters of Charity, and relocated its classes and offices from Manhattan. Crestwood is also home to the Roman Catholic Church of the Annunciation and its affiliated Annunciation School. The Annunciation Elementary School is a Catholic elementary school that begins with pre-school and continues up to the eighth grade.

Paideia School 15, part of the Yonkers Public Schools system, is also located in the neighborhood.
