= Kensico Cemetery station =

Metro-North Railroad station in New York

Kensico Cemetery
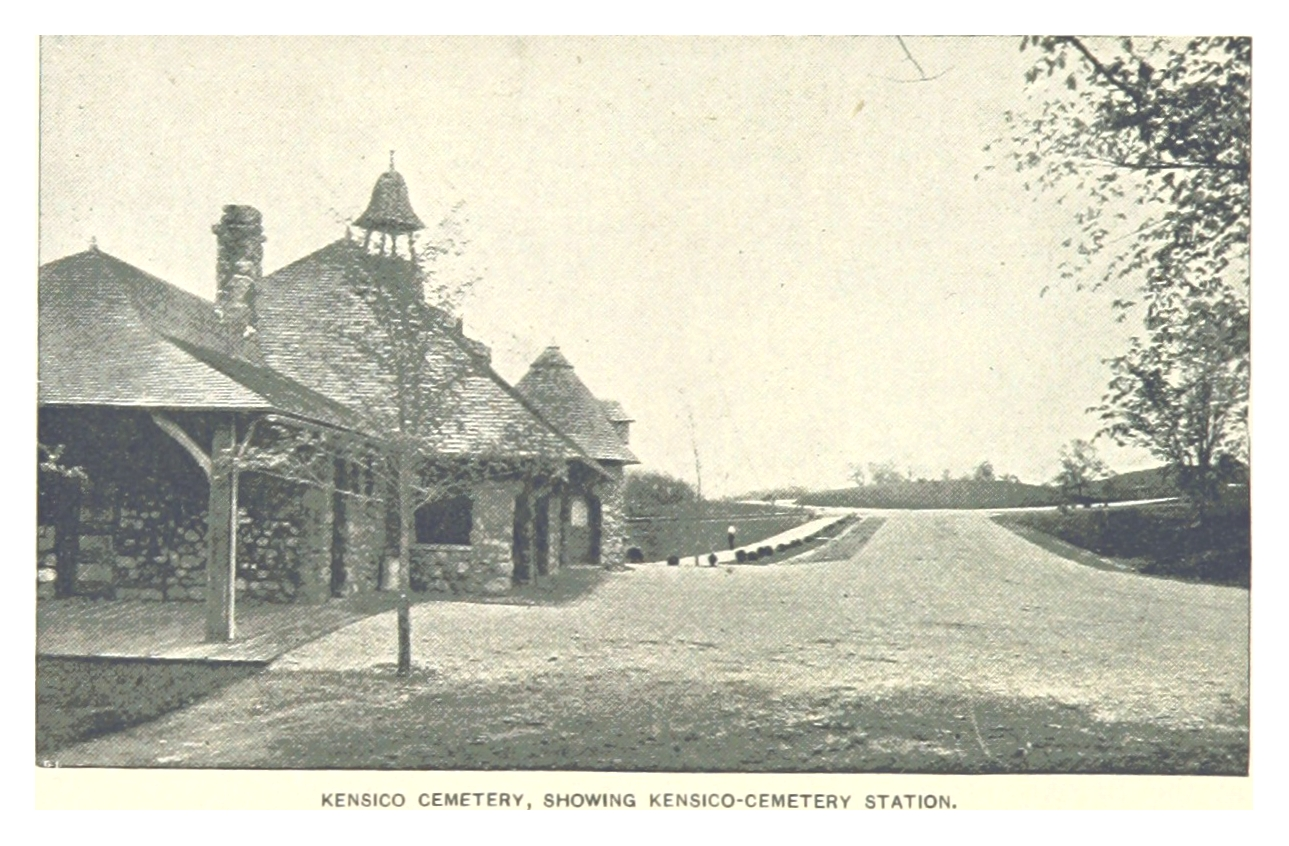
- 1893 image of the former Kensico Cemetery station

General information
- Location: 273 Lakeview Avenue; Valhalla, NY, 10595
- Coordinates: 41°04′55.9″N 73°47′03.6″W
- Line: Harlem Line
- Tracks: 2

History
- Opened: December 1891
- Closed: 1983
- Rebuilt: 1902

Former services
Preceding station	Metro-North Railroad	Following station
Valhalla toward Grand Central	Harlem Line limited service	Mount Pleasant toward Wassaic
Preceding station	New York Central Railroad	Following station
Valhalla toward New York	Harlem Division	Mount Pleasant toward Chatham
Location

Kensico Cemetery station was a commuter rail stop on the Metro-North Railroad's Harlem Line that served the nearby Kensico Cemetery, to the north of Lakeview Avenue. Located along the platform behind the buildings at Sharon Gardens, the station was similar to the still-existent and nearby Mount Pleasant station in which it served friends and family of those buried there instead of actual commuters.

By the late 1970s the low-level station saw only three trains a day on weekends, and was a flag stop for one train on weekdays. Upon the electrification of the Harlem Line between North White Plains and Brewster North in 1983, the station was closed given its redundancy to Mount Pleasant and the cost to modernize the station.
