= Fleetwood station =

Metro-North Railroad station in New York

Fleetwood
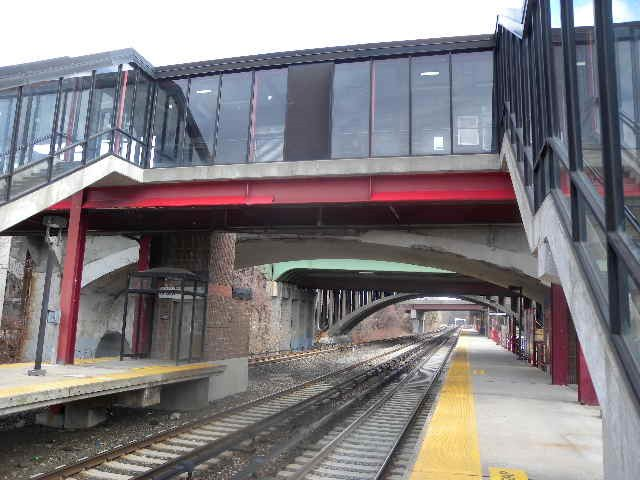
- Fleetwood station

General information
- Location: 1 North MacQuesten Parkway, Mount Vernon, New York
- Coordinates: 40.9270°N 73.8400°W
- Line: Harlem Line
- Platforms: 1 island platform 1 side platform
- Tracks: 3
- Connections: Bee-Line Bus System: 26, 55

Construction
- Parking: 654 spaces
- Accessible: yes

Other information
- Fare zone: 3

History
- Opened: October 25, 1924
- Rebuilt: 1989
- Electrified: 700V (DC) third rail

Passengers
- 2018: 2,678 (Metro-North)
- Rank: 23 of 109

Services
Preceding station	Metro-North Railroad	Following station
Mount Vernon West toward Grand Central	Harlem Line	Bronxville toward North White Plains

Former services
Preceding station	New York Central Railroad	Following station
Mount Vernon toward New York	Harlem Division	Bronxville toward Chatham
Location

Fleetwood station is a commuter rail stop on the Metro-North Railroad's Harlem Line, located in the Fleetwood section of Mount Vernon, New York.

As of August 2006, daily commuter ridership was 2,355 and there are 654 parking spots.

== History ==
Fleetwood station was originally built on October 25, 1924, by the New York Central Railroad. The Cross County Parkway was built over the station, and was widened during the 1950s and 1960s. As with the rest of the Harlem Line, the merger of New York Central with Pennsylvania Railroad in 1968 transformed it into a Penn Central station, whose service was gradually merged with the Metropolitan Transportation Authority, and officially became part of Metro-North in 1983. In the Spring of 1989, the platforms were reconstructed, along with those of Bronxville, Tuckahoe, and Crestwood stations. A two-track girder bridge over the Bronx River can be found north of the station. When the station was triple-tracked, a new bridge for the third track was built north of the station.

== Station layout ==
The station has two slightly offset high-level platforms, each 12 cars long.
