= Mount Vernon West station =

Metro-North Railroad station in New York

Mount Vernon West
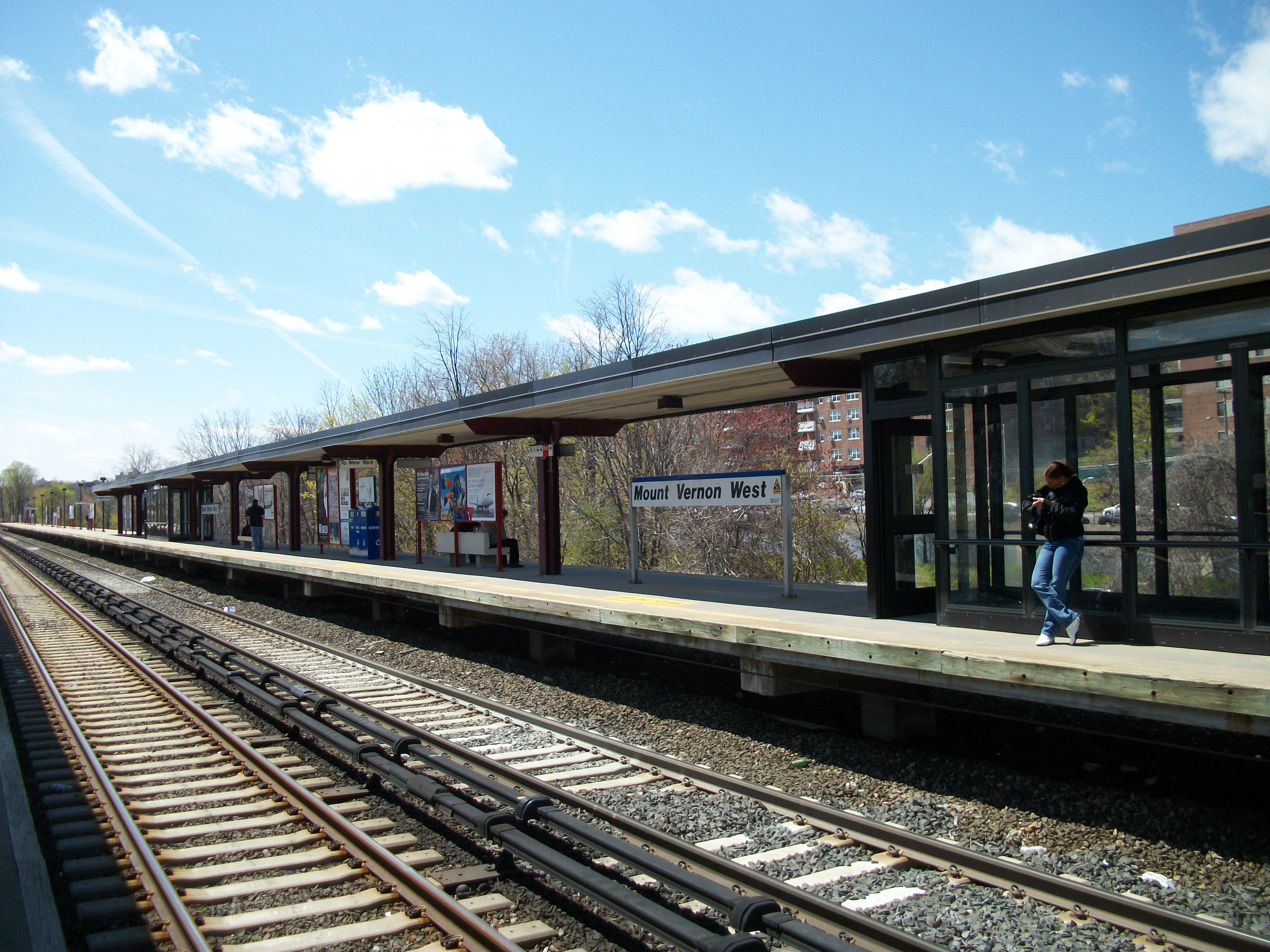
- The two center tracks at Mount Vernon West station looking south

General information
- Location: 1 Mount Vernon Avenue; Mount Vernon, New York
- Coordinates: 40.9130°N 73.8502°W
- Line: Harlem Line
- Platforms: 2 island platforms
- Tracks: 4
- Connections: Bee-Line Bus System 7, 26

Construction
- Parking: 221 spaces
- Accessible: yes

Other information
- Fare zone: 3

History
- Opened: 1914
- Electrified: 700V (DC) third rail
- Former names: Mount Vernon (until June 18, 1973)

Passengers
- 2018: 1,765 (Metro-North)
- Rank: 36 of 109

Services
Preceding station	Metro-North Railroad	Following station
Wakefield toward Grand Central	Harlem Line	Fleetwood toward North White Plains
Special events service
Preceding station	Metro-North Railroad	Following station
Yankees–East 153rd Street Terminus	Harlem Line Special events only	Fleetwood toward Southeast
Former services
Preceding station	New York Central Railroad	Following station
Wakefield toward New York	Harlem Division	Fleetwood toward Chatham
Location

Mount Vernon West station is a commuter rail stop on the Metro-North Railroad's Harlem Line, located in Mount Vernon, New York. One train from Grand Central Terminal terminates here in the PM Rush.

== History ==
The Mount Vernon West station was originally built in the early 1840s by the New York and Harlem Railroad along the median of what is today MacQuestor Parkway just south of Mount Vernon Avenue. The line was electrified and realigned in southern Mount Vernon by the New York Central and Hudson River Railroad and commissioned the architectural firm of Warren and Wetmore to build a new station along the realigned segment in 1914, although the bridge over Mount Vernon Avenue was built in 1910. As with most NYCRR stations in Westchester County, the station became a Penn Central station once the NYC & Pennsylvania Railroads merged in 1968, and eventually became part of the MTA's Metro-North Railroad.

Penn Central changed the station name on June 18, 1973 to Mount Vernon West to prevent confusion with the Mount Vernon station opened on the New Haven Division.

== Station layout ==
The station has two slightly offset high-level island platforms, each 12 cars long. Its ticket office and waiting area are at the bottom level of the Bank of New York building on Mount Vernon Avenue.

As of August 2006, daily commuter ridership was 1,172 and there are 221 parking spots. The station house which is addressed at 156 South West Street and still bears the name New York Central Railroad on its façade, is used primarily for retail, and tickets can be purchased from beneath the platforms.
