= Crestwood station =

Metro-North Railroad station in New York

Crestwood
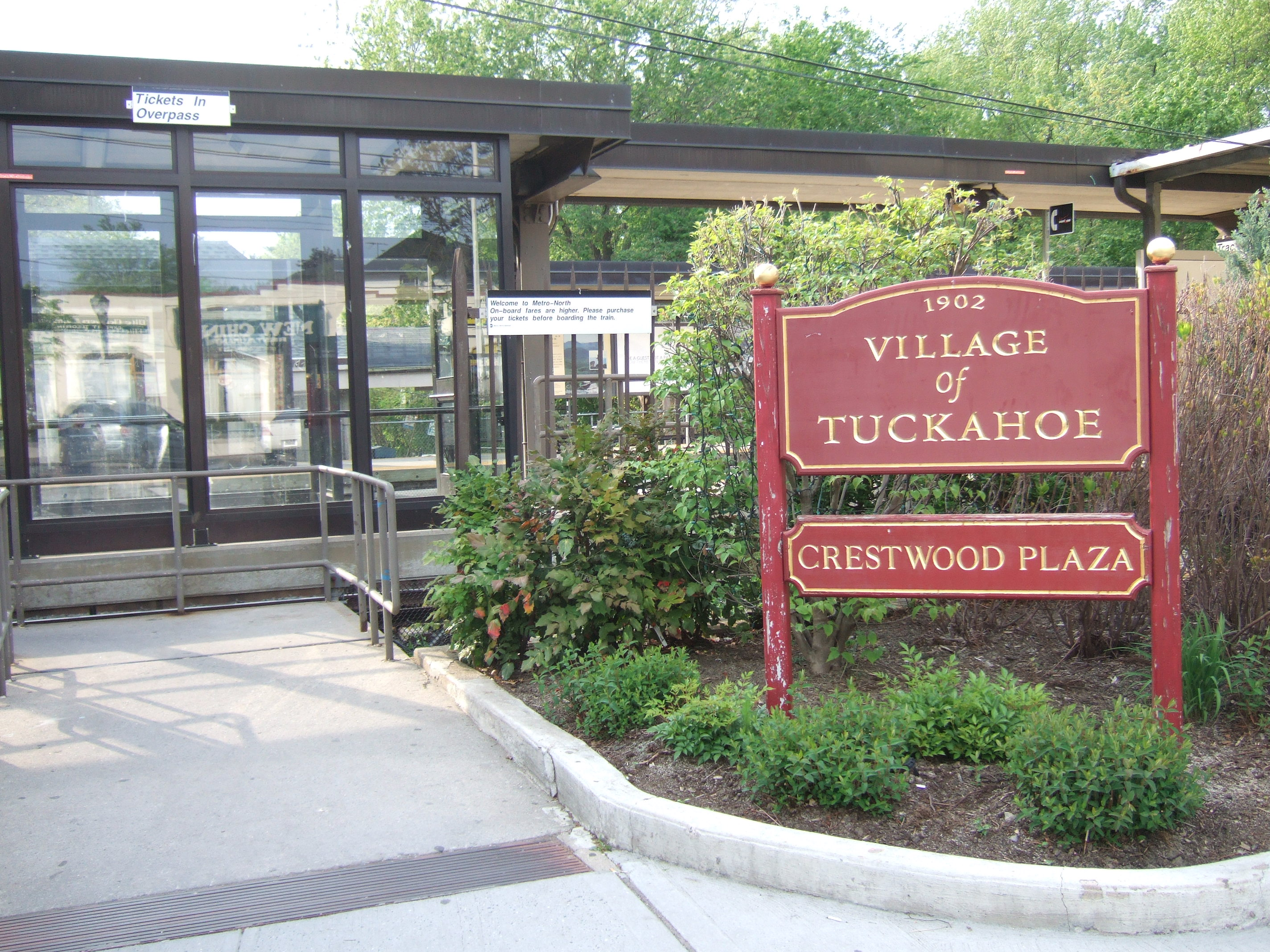
- Tuckahoe Village/Crestwood Plaza sign at Wassaic-bound platform, 2007

General information
- Location: 1 Columbus Avenue, Tuckahoe, New York
- Coordinates: 40.9590°N 73.8209°W
- Line: Harlem Line
- Platforms: 1 island platform 1 side platform
- Tracks: 3

Construction
- Parking: 283 spaces
- Accessible: yes

Other information
- Fare zone: 3

History
- Opened: 1901
- Rebuilt: 1911, 1928, 1971, 1989
- Electrified: 700V (DC) third rail
- Former names: Yonkers Park

Passengers
- 2018: 2,176 (Metro-North)
- Rank: 29 of 109

Services
| Preceding station | Metro-North Railroad | Following station |
|---|---|---|
| Tuckahoe toward Grand Central | Harlem Line | Scarsdale toward North White Plains |

Former services
| Preceding station | New York Central Railroad | Following station |
|---|---|---|
| Tuckahoe toward New York | Harlem Division | Scarsdale toward Chatham |
Location

Crestwood station is a commuter rail stop on the Metro-North Railroad's Harlem Line, serving the communities of Tuckahoe, Yonkers, and Eastchester, New York. Because of its location at the northern end of the triple-track segment of the Harlem Line, Crestwood is often the first/last stop outside New York City on Harlem Line express trains, and its center island platform is frequently used to short turn local trains during rush hour.

The Harlem Line has two stations in the village of Tuckahoe. Tuckahoe station, the next station heading southbound, is located near Tuckahoe Village Hall, while Crestwood is located near the adjoining residential neighborhood of Crestwood, Yonkers.

As of August 2006, daily commuter ridership was 1,596, and there are 283 parking spots.

== History ==
Originally built by the New York Central Railroad sometime in 1901, the station's canopy was rebuilt in 1911, then faced a major redesign in 1928. The Crestwood railroad station is depicted in the painting "Commuter" by Norman Rockwell and was featured on the cover of the November 16, 1946 edition of the Saturday Evening Post. In Norman Rockwell's depiction, you can see commuters approaching from the Crestwood side of the station. As with the rest of the Harlem Line, the merger of New York Central with Pennsylvania Railroad in 1968 transformed it into a Penn Central station, which received platform extensions in 1971.

Penn Central commuter service was gradually merged with the Metropolitan Transportation Authority (MTA), and officially became part of Metro-North in 1983. In the Spring of 1989, the platforms were reconstructed again, along with those of Fleetwood, Bronxville, and Tuckahoe stations. Under the 2015–2019 MTA Capital Plan, the station, along with four other Metro-North Railroad stations, would receive a complete overhaul as part of the Enhanced Station Initiative. Updates would include cellular service, Wi-Fi, USB charging stations, interactive service advisories, and maps. The renovations at Crestwood station cost $10.6 million and was completed at the end of October 2019.

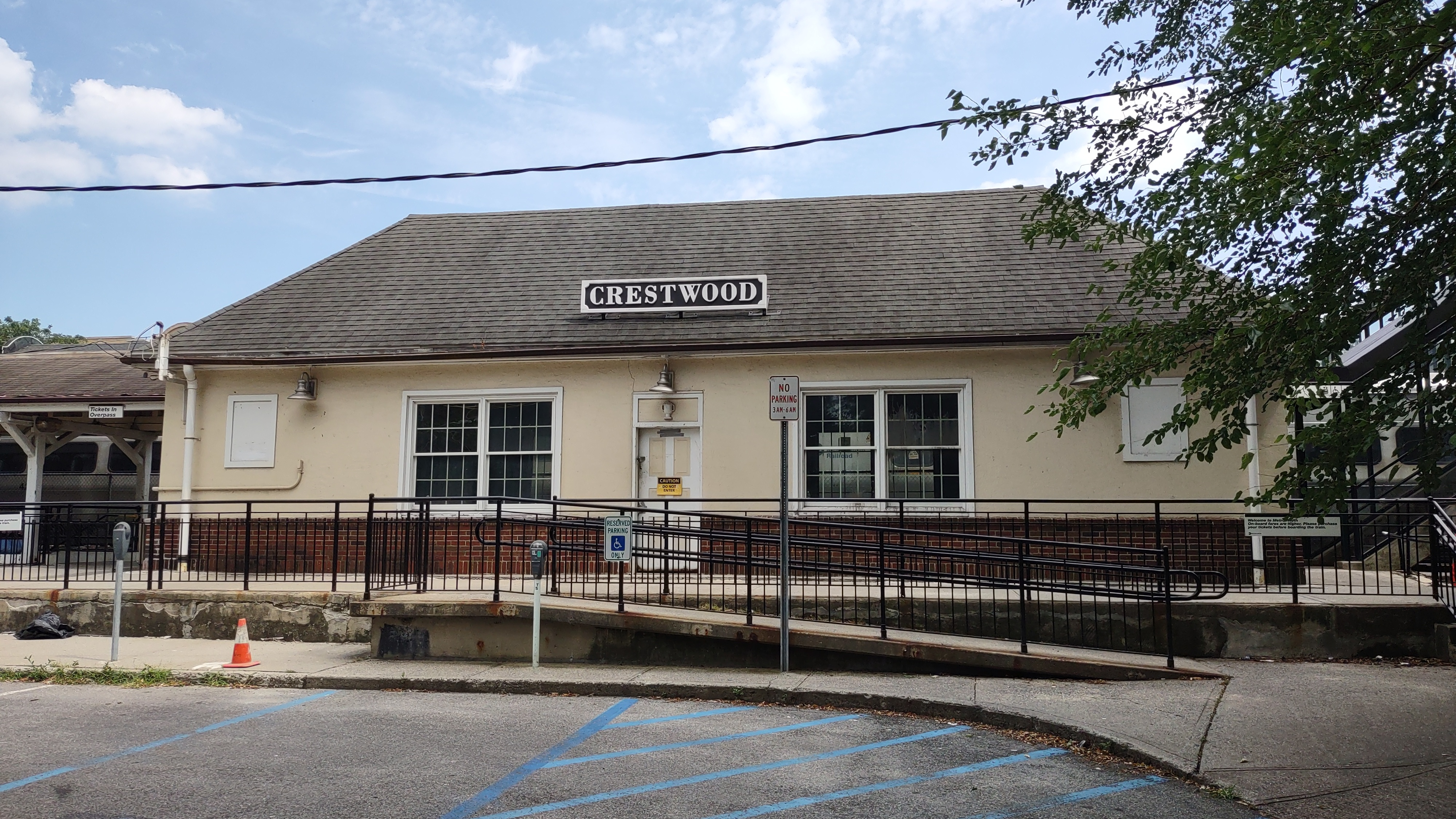
2022, after renovation

== Station layout ==
The station has two slightly offset high-level platforms each 12 cars long. Parking at the station is available on Columbus Avenue halfway between Fisher Avenue and Lincoln Avenue along the northbound platforms, and off of the Thompson Street interchange of the Bronx River Parkway along the southbound platforms.
