= Bronxville station =

Metro-North Railroad station in New York

Bronxville
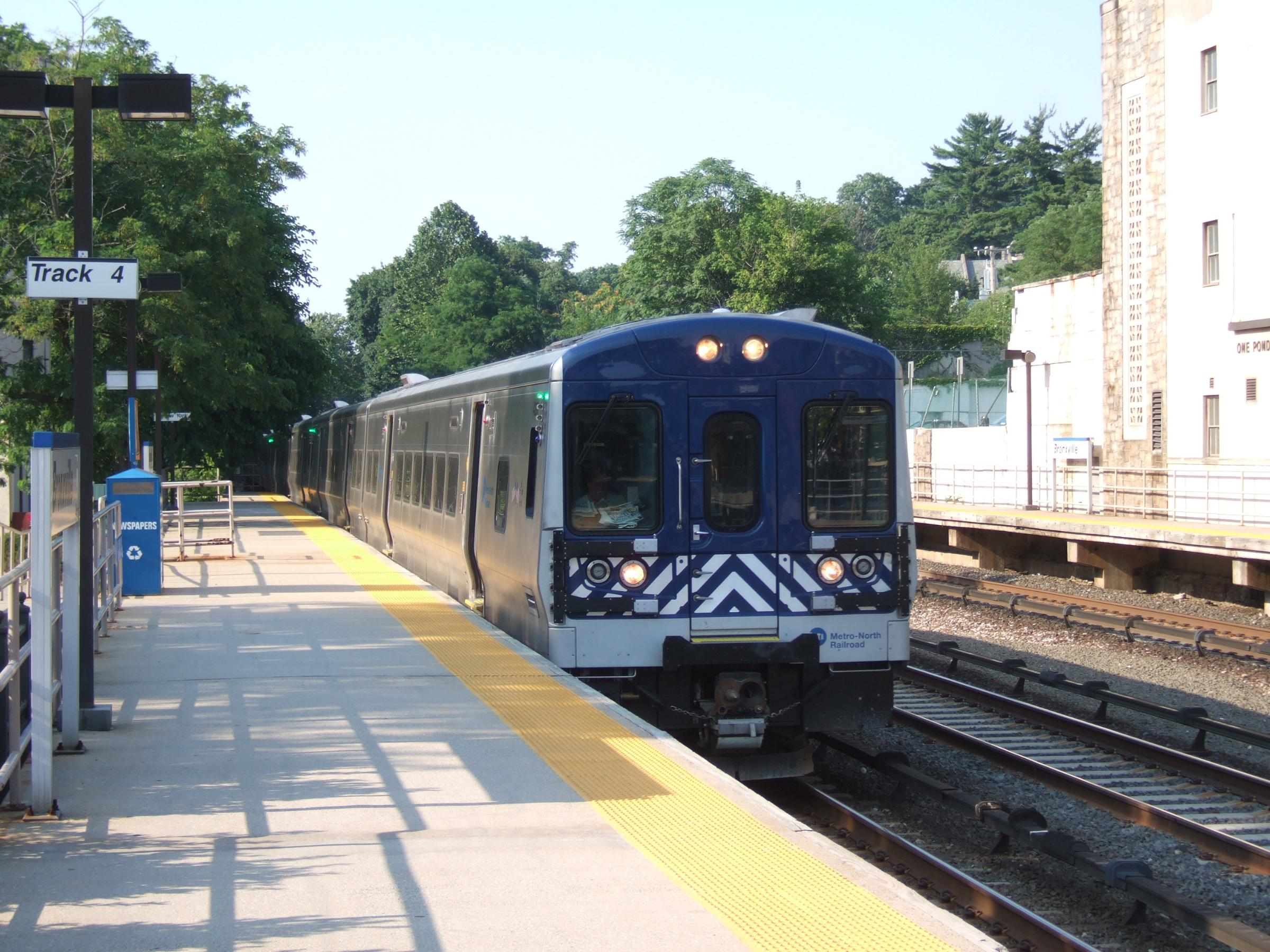
- A train arriving at Bronxville in 2007

General information
- Location: 113 Kraft Avenue (northbound); 2 Station Plaza (southbound), Bronxville, New York
- Coordinates: 40.9410°N 73.8351°W
- Line: Harlem Line
- Platforms: 2 side platforms
- Tracks: 3
- Connections: Bee-Line Bus System: 26, 30, 52

Construction
- Parking: 331 spaces

Other information
- Fare zone: 3

History
- Opened: 1850s (NY&H)
- Rebuilt: 1893, 1916 (NYC), 1989 (MNR)
- Electrified: 700V (DC) third rail

Passengers
- 2018: 3,319 (Metro-North)
- Rank: 12 of 109

Services
Preceding station	Metro-North Railroad	Following station
Fleetwood toward Grand Central	Harlem Line	Tuckahoe toward North White Plains

Former services
Preceding station	New York Central Railroad	Following station
Fleetwood toward New York	Harlem Division	Tuckahoe toward Chatham
Location

Bronxville station is a commuter rail stop on the Metro-North Railroad's Harlem Line, located in the village of Bronxville, New York, in Westchester County.

== History ==
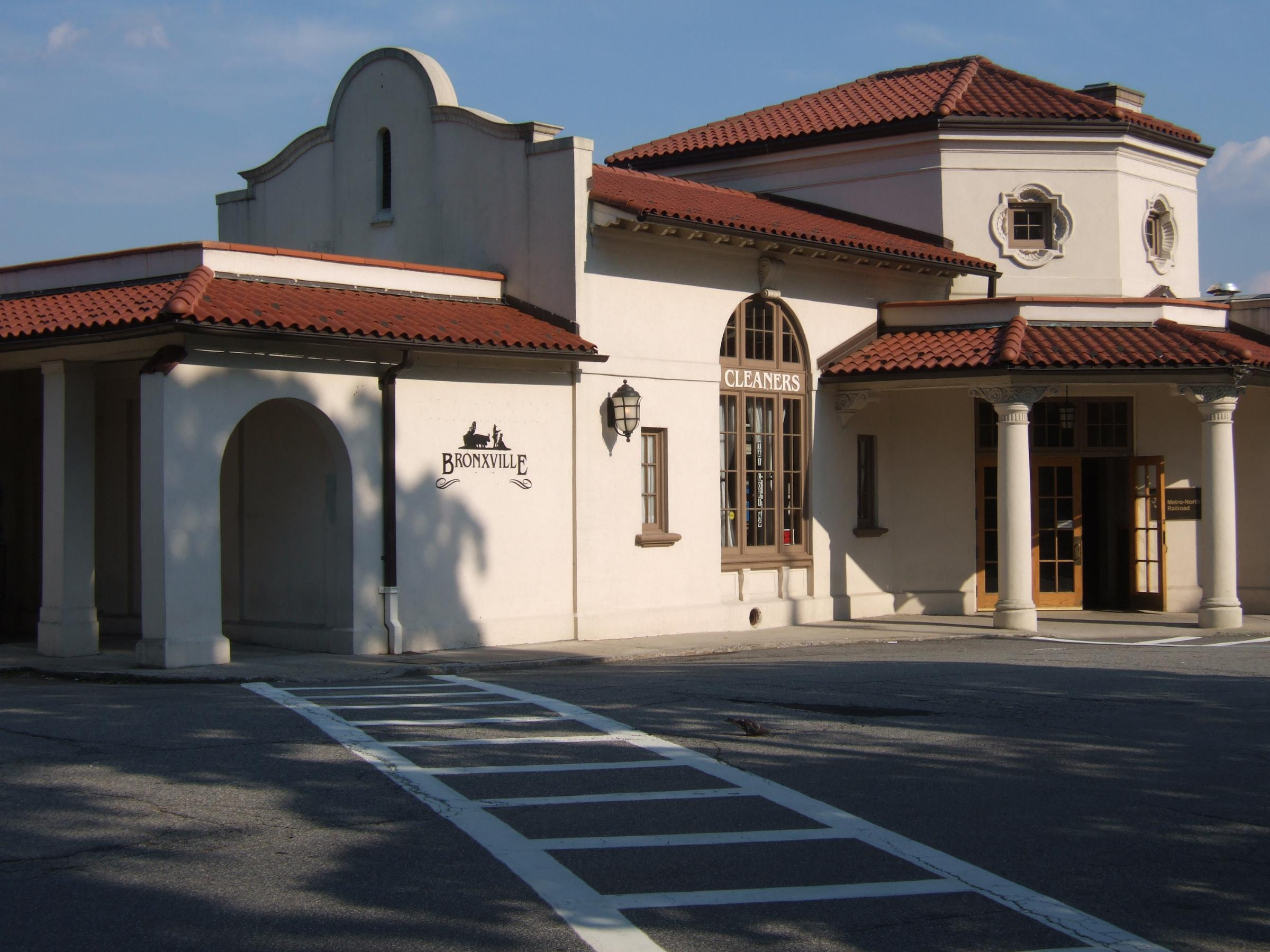
The station house at Bronxville in 2006.

The New York and Harlem Railroad laid tracks through Bronxville during the mid-1840s, and evidence of a station in Bronxville can be found at least as far back as 1858. A second station was built in 1893 by the New York Central and Hudson River Railroad, replacing a previous station which was also the home of Lancaster Underhill, a descendant of John Underhill, the man responsible for creating "Underhill's Crossing".

The third and current Bronxville Station was built in 1916 by the New York Central Railroad, in the Spanish-Mission Revival architecture designed to match that of the nearby Gramatan Hotel. As with the rest of the Harlem Line, the merger of New York Central with Pennsylvania Railroad in 1968 transformed it into a Penn Central station, and then its service was gradually merged with the Metropolitan Transportation Authority, and officially became part of Metro-North in 1983. In the Spring of 1989, the platforms were reconstructed, along with those of Fleetwood, Tuckahoe, and Crestwood stations. As of August 2006, daily commuter ridership was 3,109 and there are 331 parking spots.

== Station layout ==
The station has two high-level side platforms, each 12 cars long.
