= North White Plains =

North White Plains may refer to:

- North White Plains (Metro-North station), a railroad station in North Castle, New York
- North White Plains, a hamlet in North Castle, New York
