= Wakefield station (Metro-North) =

Metro-North Railroad station in the Bronx, New York

Wakefield
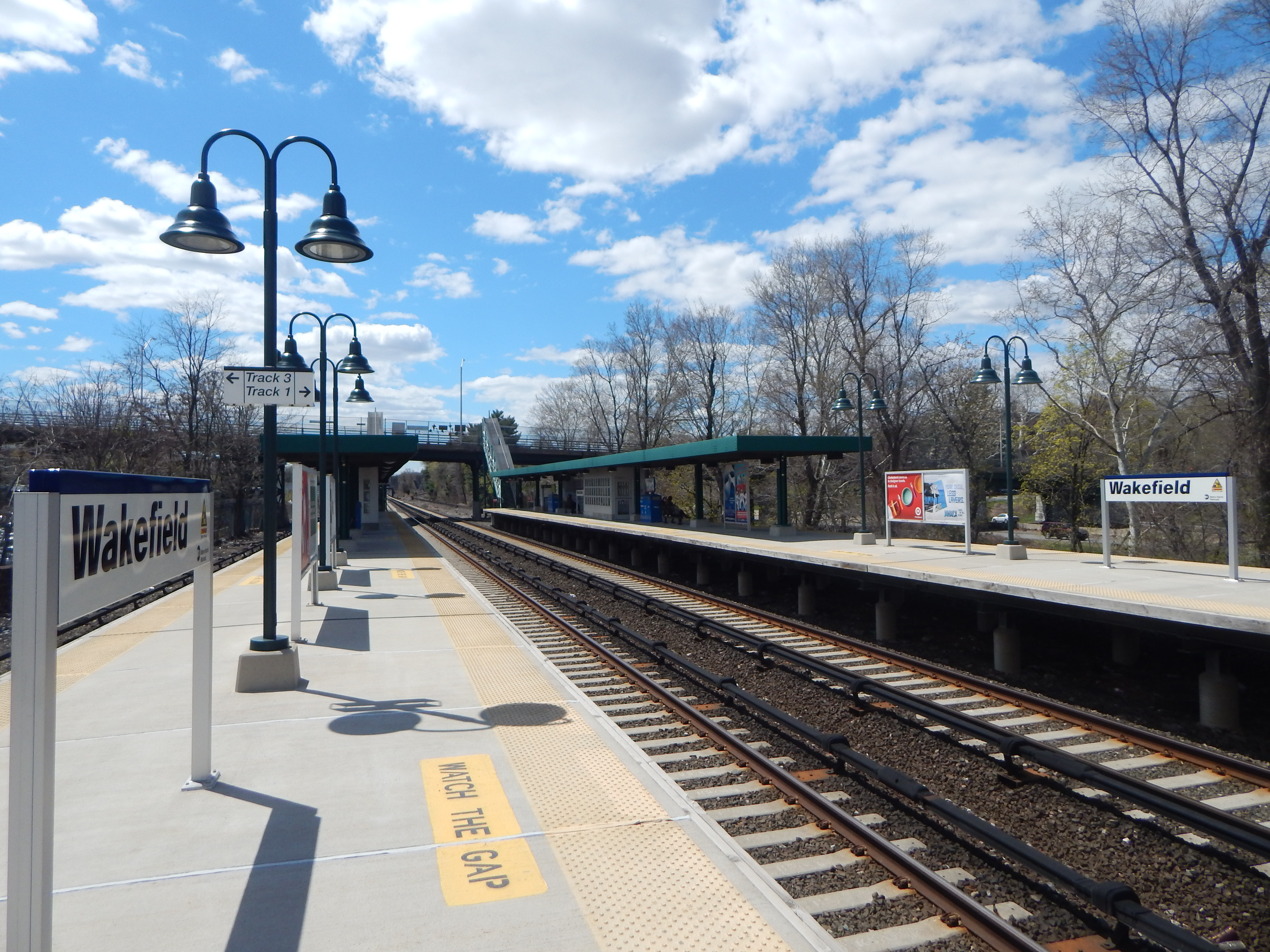
- Wakefield station in April 2015 from the outbound platform.

General information
- Location: Wakefield, Bronx, New York
- Coordinates: 40.9062°N 73.8554°W
- Owner: Metro-North Railroad
- Line: Harlem Line
- Platforms: 2 island platforms
- Tracks: 4
- Connections: Wakefield–241st Street ( train) Bee-Line Bus: 26

Construction
- Accessible: No

Other information
- Fare zone: 2

History
- Electrified: 700V (DC) third rail
- Former names: Washingtonville

Passengers
- 2018: 757 (Metro-North)
- Rank: 63 of 109

Services
Preceding station	Metro-North Railroad	Following station
Woodlawn toward Grand Central	Harlem Line	Mount Vernon West toward North White Plains

Former services
Preceding station	New York Central Railroad	Following station
Woodlawn toward New York	Harlem Division	Mount Vernon toward Chatham
Location

Wakefield station (also known as Wakefield–East 241st Street station) is a commuter rail station on the Metro-North Railroad's Harlem Line, serving the Wakefield section of the Bronx, New York City. The station is located on East 241st Street and is the northernmost stop in New York City on the Harlem Line.

== Station layout ==
The station has two high-level island platforms, each four cars long, which all four tracks of the Harlem Line. The entrances to the platforms are stairways from the north side of East 241st Street.

Five blocks east from the station is the Wakefield–241st Street station (2 train) on the IRT White Plains Road Line of the New York City Subway.

== History ==
=== Early history ===
The New York and Harlem Railroad laid tracks through Wakefield and Washingtonville during the mid-1840s as part of their effort to expand the line to Tuckahoe. The original name of the station was "Washingtonville," which was a segment of the neighborhood of Wakefield until the early-20th Century. Sometime between 1894 and 1905, the name of the station was changed to Wakefield, despite the fact that Washingtonville still existed as a neighborhood in the Bronx at the time. The station was the northern terminus of electrification for the Harlem Line in 1907 until it was expanded to White Plains in 1909.

=== Destruction and rebuilding ===
The station depot burned in a fire on August 15, 1953. After the fire, the New York Central petitioned the Public Service Commission (PSC) for permission to discontinue the station. It argued that the station's low ridership did not justify rebuilding the station, and that riders could use the nearby Mount Vernon or Woodlawn stations. On September 3, 1953, the City Manager of Yonkers said that the City of Yonkers would oppose the discontinuation of the station.

On October 16, 1953, twenty commuters protested the plan to close the station at a public hearing. On November 16, 1953, at the final hearing, the assistant corporation counsel of Yonkers said that the Central had given the impression that it would at a minimum construct new platforms at the station site. He also said that commuter groups and representatives of municipalities from the Bronx and Yonkers had agreed that constructing a 150 feet (46 m)-long platform with a 51 feet (16 m)-long canopy on each platform would be sufficient. At the hearing, the Central's attorney denied to agree to rebuild the station. The railroad considered the $28,000 cost for the project to be prohibitive. The attorney for the railroad stated building an exact reproduction of the station would cost $56,500. Constructing concrete platforms, instead of wooden platforms, would have raised the cost to $85,500.

On December 14, 1953, the PSC denied the Central's petition to discontinue service, and ordered the railroad to restore service to the station by January 4, 1954, and to rebuild the station with two 148 feet (45 m) platforms with canopies. In addition, stairways, and enclosures would be repaired, and signage and lighting would be installed. However, the PSC gave the Central permission to discontinue the station's part-time agent.

=== Later years ===
On September 10, 1974, the MTA announced that work would start on the construction of high-level platforms at eleven stations in Manhattan and the Bronx including at Wakefied. The entire project cost $2.8 million. The work was expected to be completed in the late summer of 1975. As part of the work the stations on the Harlem Line received 340 feet (100 m)-long cast-in-place concrete platforms. High-level platforms were eventually added to the station in 1976, replacing lower wooden ones.

On September 29, 2013, 17-year-old Mount Saint Michael Academy student Matthew Wallace was struck and killed by a northbound train. A permanent, makeshift memorial constructed by Wallace's family and friends stands at the station's only entrance.
