= Mount Pleasant station (Metro-North) =

Metro-North Railroad station in New York

Mt. Pleasant
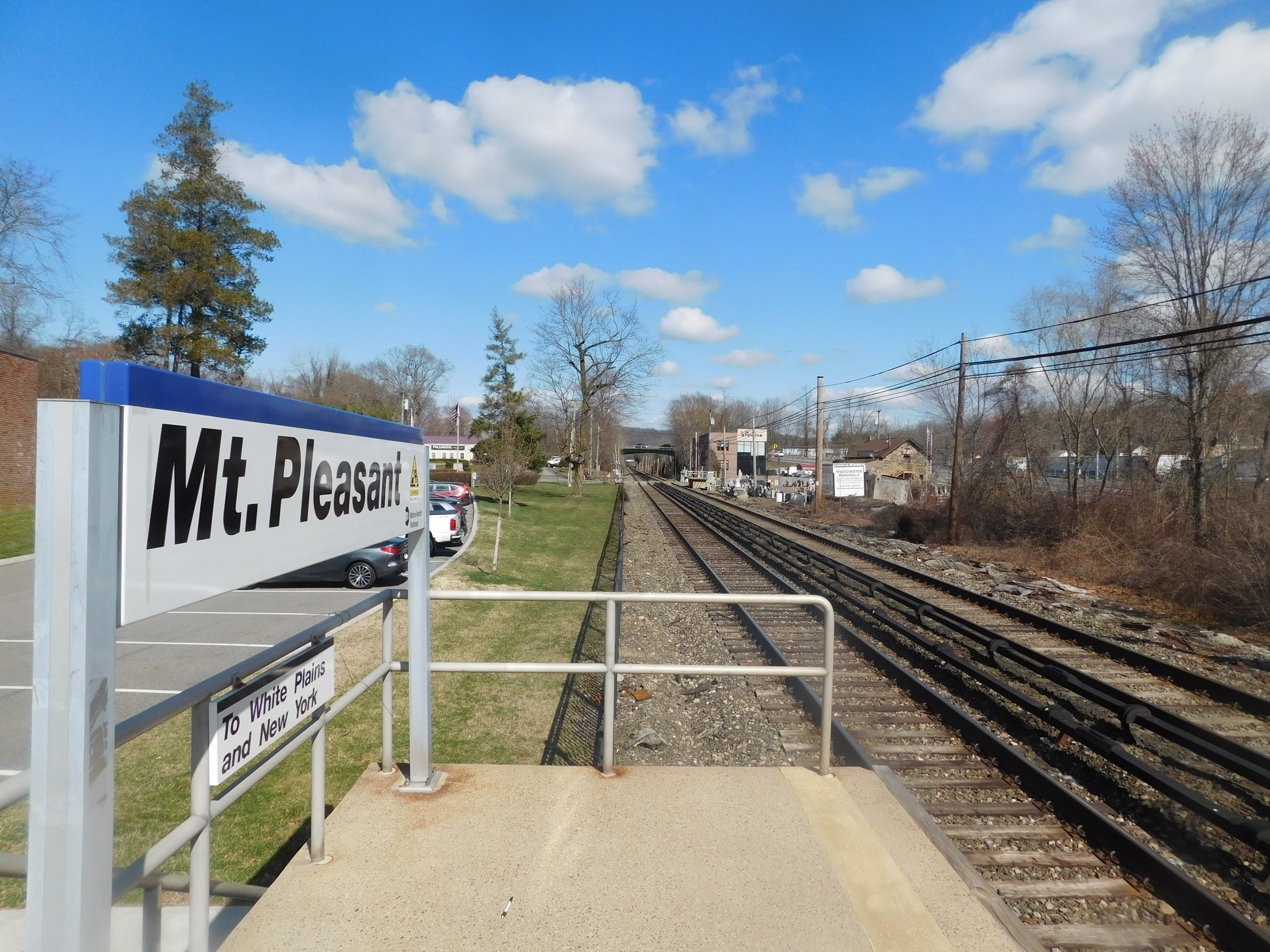
- The inbound platform at the Mount Pleasant station in March 2024.

General information
- Location: 1 West Stevens Avenue, Hawthorne, New York
- Coordinates: 41.0960°N 73.7938°W
- Line: Harlem Line
- Platforms: 2 side platforms
- Tracks: 2

Other information
- Fare zone: 5

History
- Electrified: 1984; 700V (DC) third rail

Passengers
- 2018: 13 per week

Services
Preceding station	Metro-North Railroad	Following station
Valhalla toward Grand Central	Harlem Line limited service	Hawthorne toward Southeast
Former services
Preceding station	Metro-North Railroad	Following station
Kensico Cemetery (closed 1984) toward Grand Central	Harlem Line	Hawthorne toward Wassaic
Preceding station	New York Central Railroad	Following station
Kensico Cemetery toward New York	Harlem Division	Hawthorne toward Chatham
Location

Mount Pleasant station is a commuter rail stop on the Metro-North Railroad's Harlem Line, serving the town of Mount Pleasant, New York. It serves two adjacent cemeteries, Gate of Heaven and Kensico, the latter of which had its own station until the mid-1980s. There is one train in each direction on weekdays and three trains in each direction on weekends. The station exists largely to serve visitors of those buried in the cemetery, in turn there is no parking available at the station and it is not intended as a commuter station.

The station is located in the Zone 5 Metro-North fare zone.

On February 3, 2015, the Valhalla train crash occurred south of the station, in which a Metro-North train crashed into a Mercedes-Benz SUV at Commerce Street near the Taconic State Parkway. The crash caused 6 deaths and at least 15 injuries, including 7 serious injuries.

The station is the least used station on Metro-North, with only 13 passengers per week in 2018.

The station has two offset high-level side platforms, each about 50 feet long, and can fit half a car. They are accessible to only one door of a train. When trains stop here, usually the first or last car receives and discharges passengers.
