= Valhalla station =

Metro-North Railroad station in New York

Valhalla
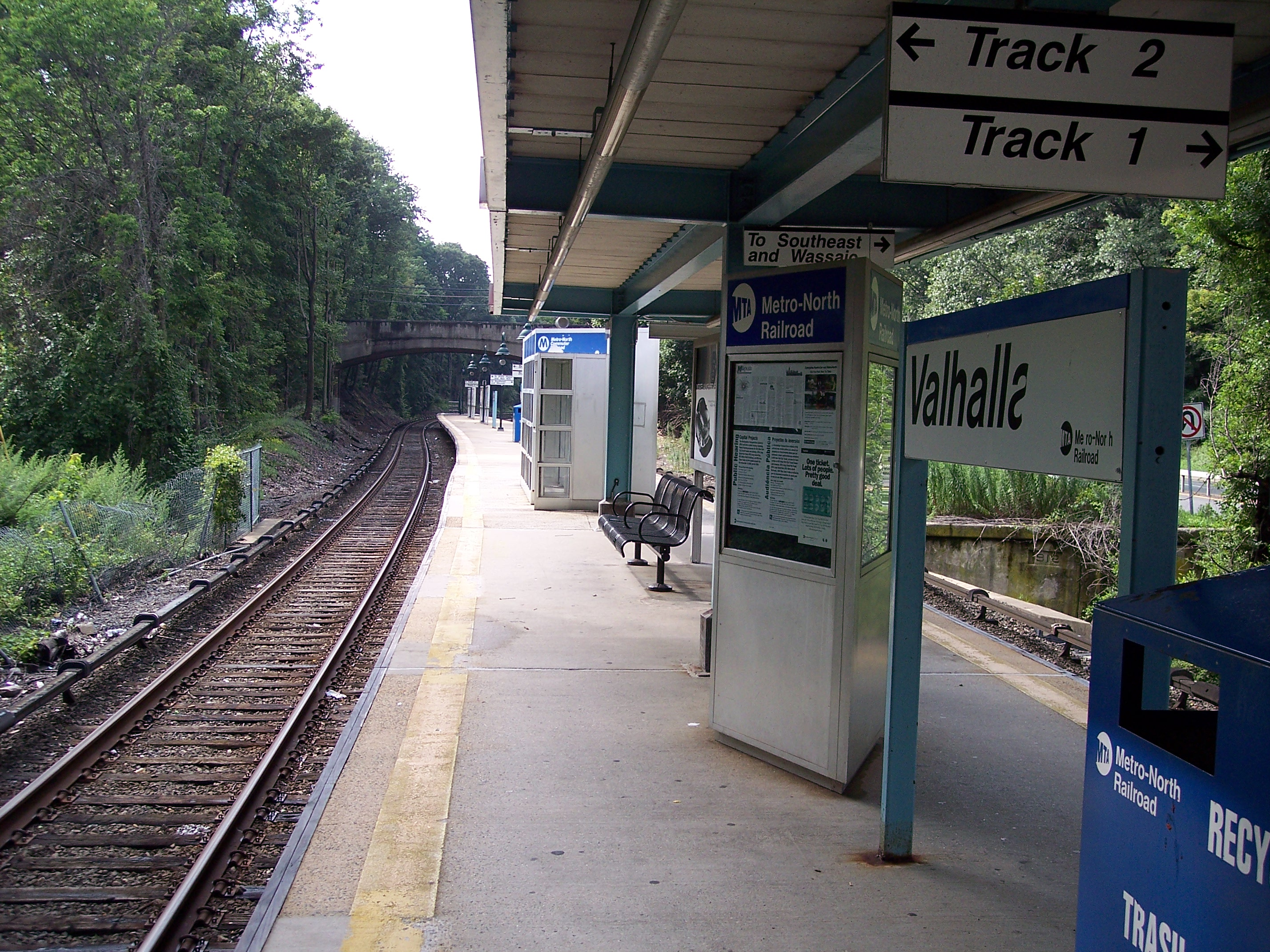
- Northbound view of Valhalla station from the southbound side of the platform.

General information
- Location: 2 Cleveland Street, Valhalla, New York
- Coordinates: 41.0732°N 73.7729°W
- Line: Harlem Line
- Platforms: 1 island platform
- Tracks: 2
- Connections: Bee-Line: 6

Construction
- Parking: 191 spaces
- Accessible: yes

Other information
- Fare zone: 5

History
- Opened: 1890
- Electrified: 1984; 700V (DC) third rail

Passengers
- 2018: 467 (Metro-North)
- Rank: 75 of 109

Services
Preceding station	Metro-North Railroad	Following station
North White Plains toward Grand Central	Harlem Line limited service	Mount Pleasant toward Southeast
North White Plains toward Grand Central	Harlem Line	Hawthorne toward Southeast
Former services
Preceding station	Metro-North Railroad	Following station
North White Plains toward Grand Central	Harlem Line	Kensico Cemetery (closed 1984) toward Wassaic
Preceding station	New York Central Railroad	Following station
North White Plains toward New York	Harlem Division	Kensico Cemetery toward Chatham
Location

Valhalla station is a commuter rail stop on the Metro-North Railroad's Harlem Line, located in Mount Pleasant, New York.

== History ==
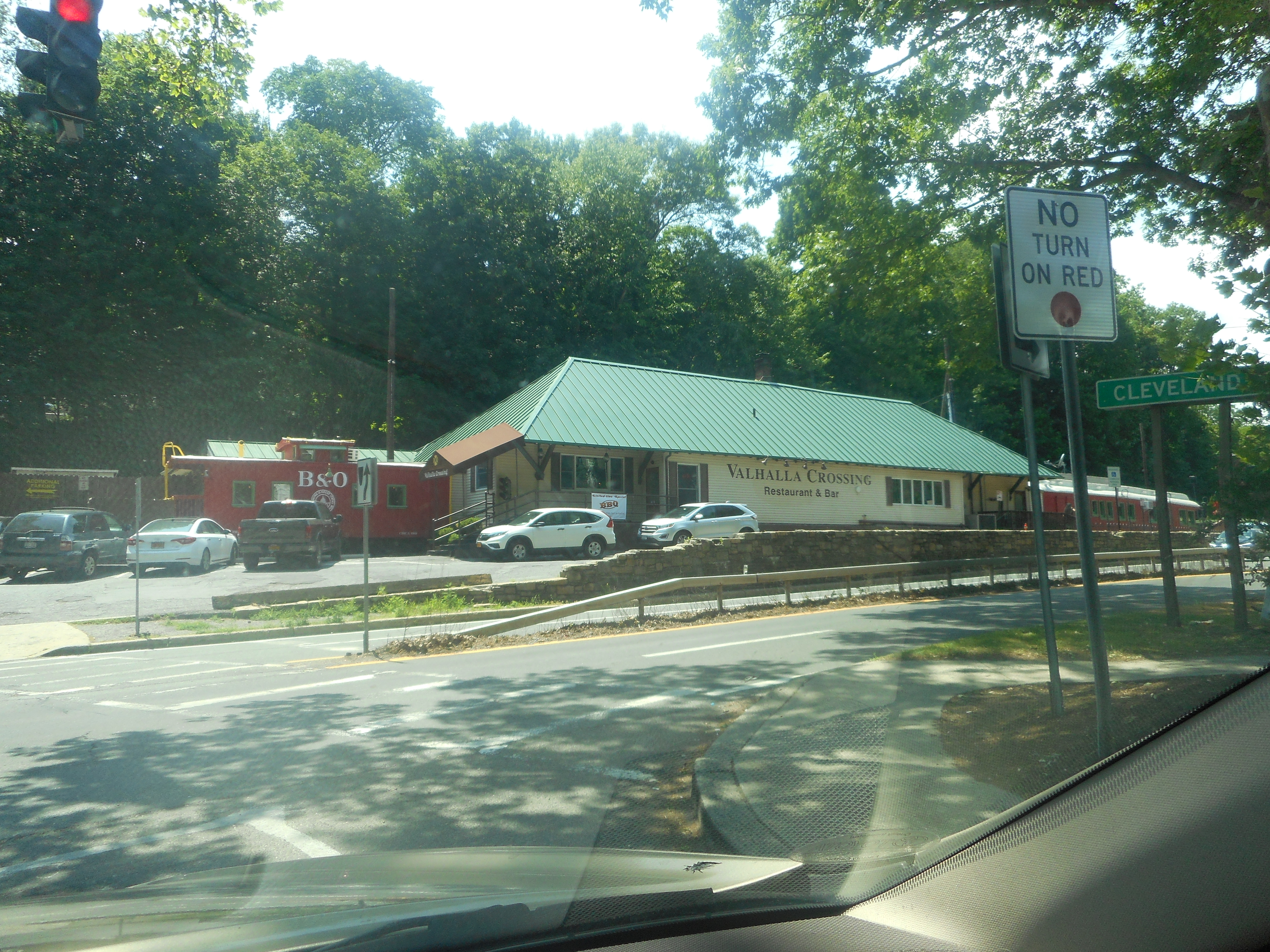
The former New York Central Railroad station house, now the Valhalla Crossing Station Restaurant.

Rail service in Valhalla can be traced as far back as 1846, with the establishment of the New York and Harlem Railroad, which installed a station named "Davis Brook," but by 1851 the name had been changed to "Kensico." The NY&H became part of the New York Central and Hudson River Railroad in 1864 and eventually taken over by the New York Central Railroad. By the late-1880s Kensico and the rail line that ran through it were relocated to make way for the Kensico Reservoir despite protests from the community lasting for the rest of the century, and the community that replaced it was named "Valhalla." The current station house was built in 1890, and at some point was converted into a restaurant.

As with most of the Harlem Line, the merger of New York Central with Pennsylvania Railroad in 1968 transformed the station into a Penn Central Railroad station. Penn Central's continuous financial despair throughout the 1970s forced them to turn over their commuter service to the Metropolitan Transportation Authority which made it part of Metro-North in 1983.

Prior to Metro-North Railroad's electrification of this section of the Harlem Line in 1984, service at the station had been greatly reduced compared to other similar stations. In the late 1970s, weekday service was about half that of most other stations north of North White Plains, and weekend service was limited to a flag stop for six trains. By 1990, service had been restored to fourteen trains a day on weekends, the equivalent of that at other similar stations.

== 2015 accident ==
On February 3, 2015, the Valhalla train crash occurred north of the station, in which a Metro-North train crashed into a Mercedes-Benz SUV at Commerce Street near the Taconic State Parkway. The crash caused six deaths and at least 15 injuries, including seven serious injuries.

== Station layout ==
The station has one six-car-long high-level island platform serving trains in both directions.
