= Tuckahoe station =

Metro-North Railroad station in New York

Tuckahoe
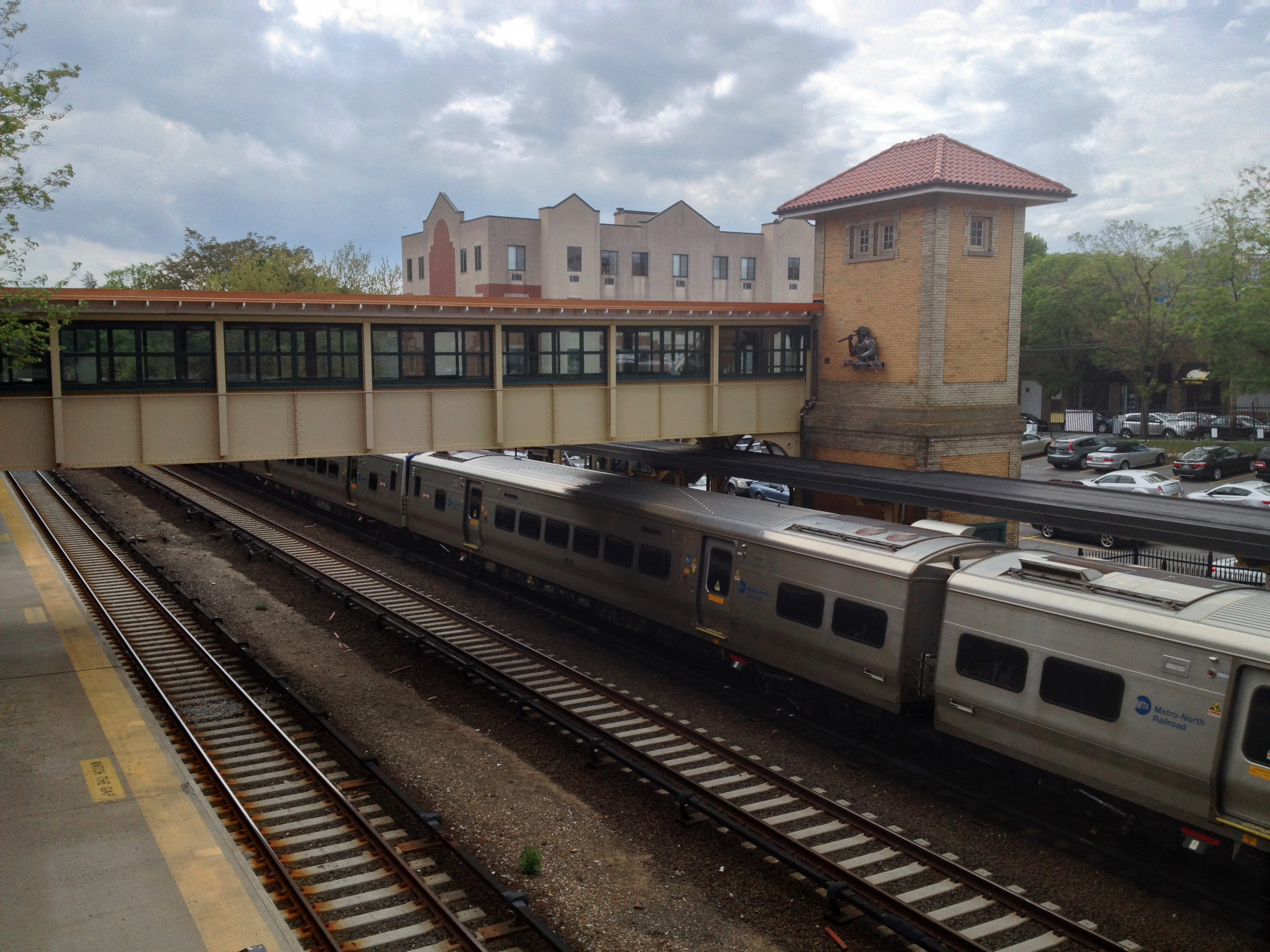
- Looking southwest at Tuckahoe station from the northwest corner of Main Street and Oak Avenue

General information
- Location: 1 Depot Square, Tuckahoe, New York
- Coordinates: 40.9505°N 73.8284°W
- Line: Harlem Line
- Platforms: 2 side platforms
- Tracks: 3
- Connections: Bee-Line Bus System: 8

Construction
- Parking: 314 spaces

Other information
- Fare zone: 3

History
- Opened: July 2, 1844
- Rebuilt: 1901, c. 1912, 1989
- Electrified: 700V (DC) third rail

Passengers
- 2018: 1,956 (Metro-North)
- Rank: 32 of 109

Services
Preceding station	Metro-North Railroad	Following station
Bronxville toward Grand Central	Harlem Line	Crestwood toward North White Plains

Former services
Preceding station	New York Central Railroad	Following station
Bronxville toward New York	Harlem Division	Crestwood toward Chatham
Location

Tuckahoe station is a commuter rail stop on the Metro-North Railroad's Harlem Line, located in the village of Tuckahoe, New York.

== History ==
The New York and Harlem Railroad laid tracks through Tuckahoe during the mid-1840s, and evidence of a station in Tuckahoe can be found at least as far back as the 1850s. The current Tuckahoe station building was originally built in 1901, by the New York Central Railroad, and was given an additional baggage elevator approximately in 1912. The station continued to serve commuters without much change until the New York Central merged with rival Pennsylvania Railroad to form Penn Central in 1968. As Penn Central was facing bankruptcy, the Metropolitan Transportation Authority began subsidizing service in 1970, and high-level platforms were constructed to accommodate the new M1A electric MU cars being delivered at the time. Operation of the railroad continued and was passed on to Conrail in 1976. Metro-North took over direct operation in 1983.

In the Spring of 1989, the platforms were reconstructed, along with those of Fleetwood, Bronxville, and Crestwood stations. The baggage and freight elevators were also converted into passenger elevators

== Station layout ==
The station has two high-level side platforms, each 12 cars long.

As of August 2006, daily commuter ridership was 1,378 and there are 314 parking spots.
