= Metro-North Railroad =

Commuter rail service in New York and Connecticut

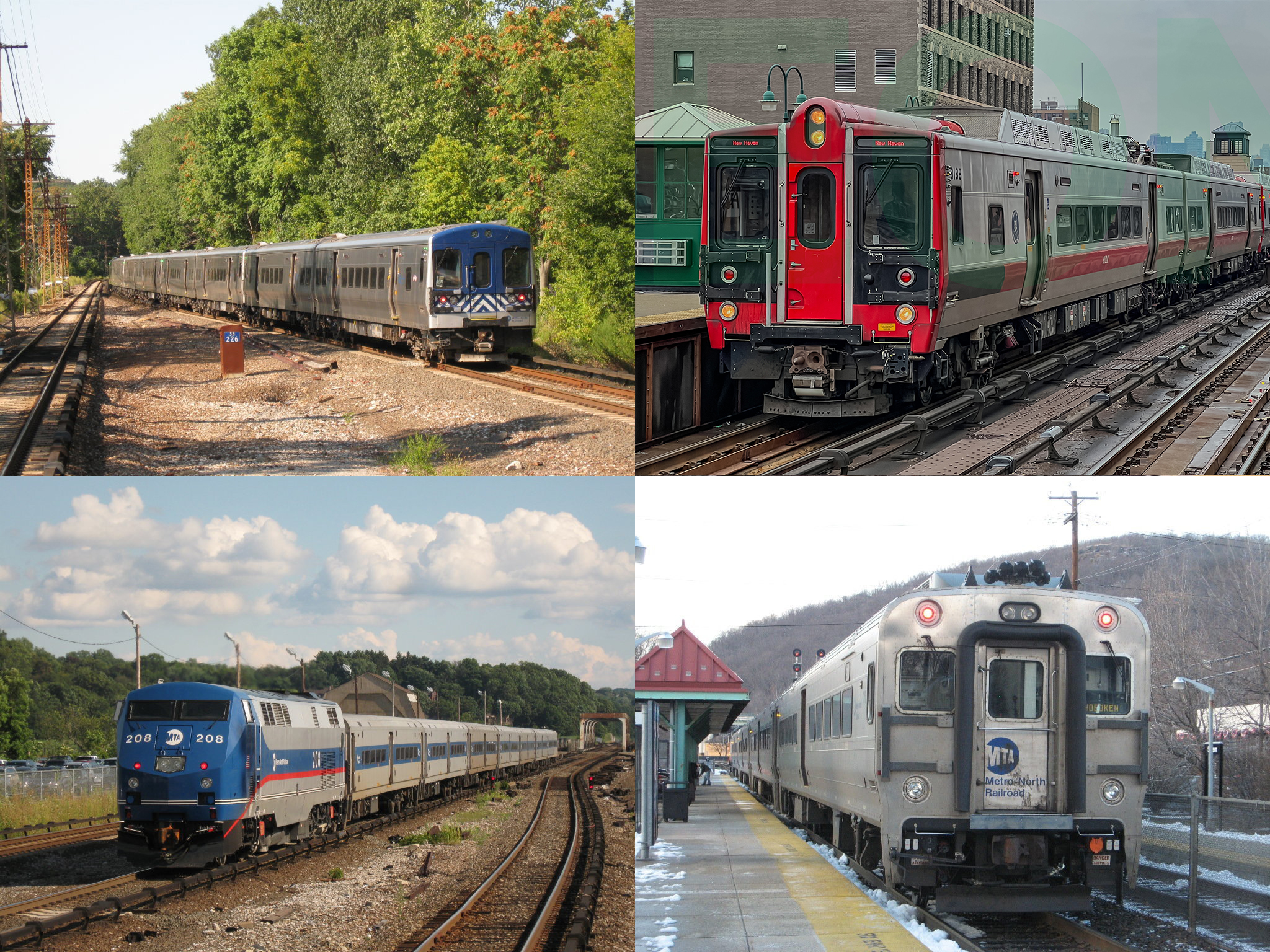
- Metro-North Railroad provides services in the lower Hudson Valley, northern New Jersey (in conjunction with New Jersey Transit), and Western Connecticut.

Overview
- Owner: Metropolitan Transportation Authority
- Locale: Hudson Valley of New York; Southwestern Connecticut; Manhattan, The Bronx, North Jersey
- Transit type: Commuter rail
- Number of lines: 5 rail lines and 3 branches
- Number of stations: 124
- Daily ridership: 274,700 (weekdays, Q2 2026)
- Annual ridership: 71,758,600 (2025)
- Chief executive: Justin Vonashek
- Headquarters: Graybar Building, 420 Lexington Avenue, New York, New York
- Website: mta.info/mnr

Operation
- Began operation: 1983
- Operators: Metropolitan Transportation Authority; NJ Transit (west-of-Hudson)
- Reporting marks: MNCW
- Character: At-grade, elevated, and underground

Technical
- System length: 787 mi (1,267 km) (385 mi (620 km), routes)
- Track gauge: 4 ft 8 1/2 in (1,435 mm) standard gauge
- Electrification: Third rail, 750 V DC; Overhead line, 12.5 kV 60 Hz AC
System map
Map of the entire Metro-North Railroad system. This schematic is not to scale.

The Metro-North Commuter Railroad Company (reporting mark MNCW), branded as MTA Metro-North Railroad and commonly called simply Metro-North, is a suburban commuter rail service operated by the Metropolitan Transportation Authority (MTA), a public authority of the U.S. state of New York. Metro-North serves the New York Metropolitan Area, primarily operating between New York City and its northern suburbs in New York and Connecticut while also providing service within New Jersey. Areas served include Port Jervis, Spring Valley, Poughkeepsie, Yonkers, White Plains, and Wassaic in New York and Stamford, New Canaan, Danbury, Bridgeport, Waterbury, and New Haven in Connecticut. Service in Connecticut is operated under contract for the Connecticut Department of Transportation; conversely, service on lines west of the Hudson River is operated under contract by NJ Transit. Metro-North also provides local rail service within the New York City boroughs of Manhattan and the Bronx.

Metro-North is the descendant of commuter rail services dating back as early as 1832. By 1969, they had all been acquired by Penn Central. The MTA acquired the Harlem, Hudson, and New Haven Lines by 1972, but Penn Central continued to operate them under contract. Service was transferred to Conrail in 1976, when it absorbed most of Penn Central's railroad functions after Penn Central's bankruptcy. The system took its current form in 1983, when the MTA took over direct operation of Conrail's commuter services in the northern portion of the Tri-State Area and formed Metro-North to run them.

There are 124 stations on Metro-North Railroad's five active lines and three branches, which operate on more than 787 miles (1,267 km) of track, with the passenger railroad system totaling 385 miles (620 km) of route. It is the second-busiest commuter railroad in North America in terms of annual ridership, behind its sister railroad, the Long Island Rail Road, and ahead of NJ Transit (both of which also serve New York City). As of 2018, Metro-North's budgetary burden for expenditures was $1.3 billion, which it supports through the collection of taxes and fees. In 2025, the system had a ridership of 71,758,600, or about 274,700 per weekday as of the second quarter of 2026.

Additionally, the Newburgh-Beacon, and the Haverstraw-Ossining ferry services connecting to Metro-North is operated by NY Waterway, also under contract with the MTA. Also operated under contract with the MTA is the Hudson Rail Link, which is operated by Consolidated Bus Transit (formerly Atlantic Express).

== Lines ==
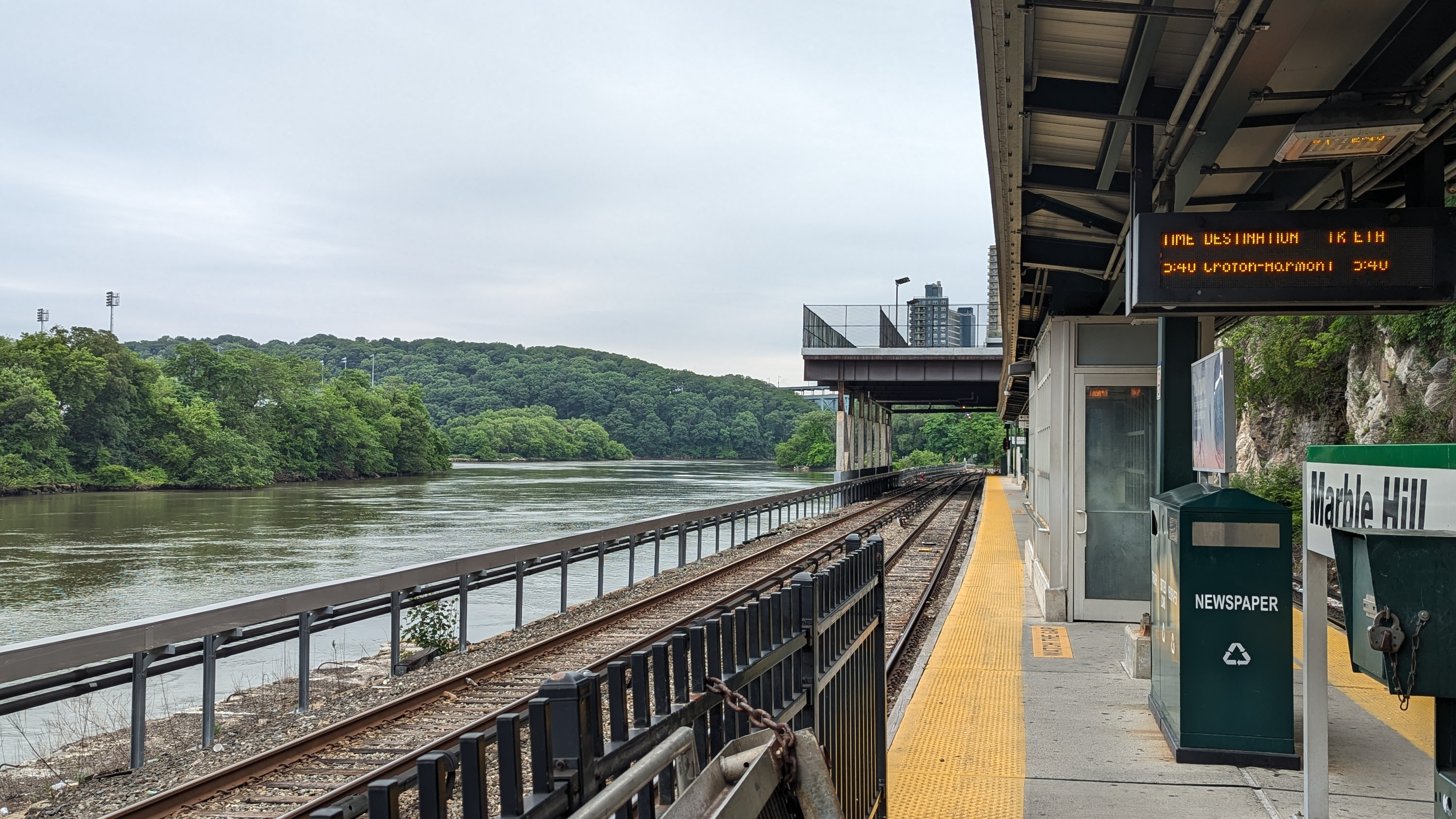
Marble Hill station on the Hudson Line

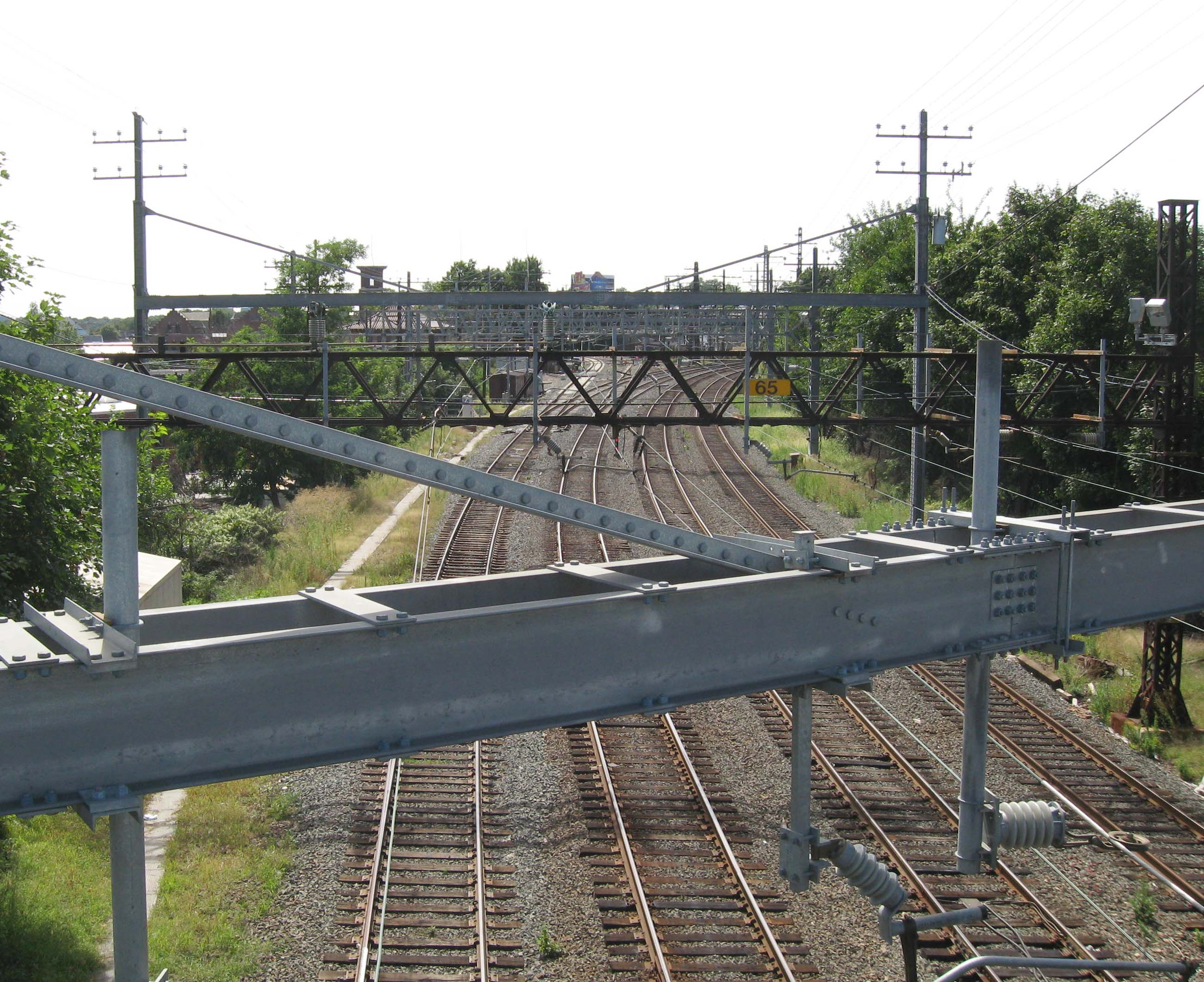
Northeast Corridor and New Haven Line in New Rochelle

=== East of the Hudson River ===
Three lines provide passenger service on the east side of the Hudson River to Grand Central Terminal in Manhattan: the Hudson, Harlem, and New Haven Lines. The Beacon Line is a freight line owned by Metro-North but is not in service.

Freight trains operate over Metro-North lines, though the company itself does not operate freight services. The Hudson Line connects with the Oak Point Link and is the main route for freight to and from the Bronx and Long Island. Freight railroads CSX, CP Rail, P&W, and Housatonic Railroad have trackage rights on sections of the system. See Rail freight transportation in New York City and Long Island.

==== Harlem Line ====
The Harlem Line runs from Grand Central to Wassaic, in Amenia, New York. It is colored blue on Metro-North timetables and system maps, and stations on the line have blue trim. This was carried over from its predecessor, the New York Central's Harlem Division, which was colored blue as early as 1965.

The Harlem Line has 38 stations - the most out of any mainline on the system. On the electrified portion of the line, local trains usually run between Grand Central and North White Plains. Express trains usually skip the stops between Grand Central and White Plains, before running local between White Plains and Southeast. It is the only line not shared with another passenger carrier.

North of Southeast, the Harlem Line is single-tracked and uses diesel-powered trains. Service here is mostly shuttle or "scoot" operation between Southeast and Wassaic and is sometimes referred to as the "Wassaic Branch". At present there are only two scheduled peak trains providing through service between Wassaic and Grand Central in each direction.

==== Hudson Line ====
The Hudson Line runs alongside the Hudson River from Grand Central to Poughkeepsie, New York. It is colored green on Metro-North system maps and timetables; its predecessor, the New York Central Hudson Division, was colored green as early as 1965.

The Hudson Line is split into two distinct segments at Croton-Harmon, with electrified service running south of the station and diesel service running north of it. Additionally MNRR has introduced new dual-mode diesel/electric service on the full length of the Hudson line. Usually, electric trains run local between Grand Central and Croton-Harmon. Diesel trains run express between Grand Central and Croton-Harmon, before running local between Croton-Harmon and Poughkeepsie. It runs along the southern leg of Amtrak's Empire Corridor, the former main line of the New York Central.

==== New Haven Line ====
The New Haven Line runs between Grand Central and New Haven, Connecticut. It is colored red on Metro-North system maps and timetables, and its stations have red trim; the New Haven used red livery for much of the latter part of its history. Most of its trackage is shared with Amtrak's Northeast Corridor, specifically Amtrak routes running between New York and Boston. As a result, the New Haven Line is the only fully electrified mainline on the Metro-North network.

The New Haven Line is split into an "inner zone" and an "outer zone" at Stamford - similar to White Plains on the Harlem Line and Croton-Harmon on the Hudson Line. Usually, "inner zone" trains run local, serving all stops between Grand Central and Stamford. "Outer zone" trains run express between Grand Central and Stamford, before running local between Stamford and New Haven. There is also limited peak-hour service to New Haven State Street.

The New Haven Line also has three branch lines: the New Canaan, Danbury, and Waterbury Branches. The New Canaan Branch, like the New Haven mainline, is fully electrified; the Danbury and Waterbury Branches use diesel-powered trains.

=== West of the Hudson ===
Metro-North provides service west of the Hudson River on trains from Hoboken Terminal, New Jersey, jointly run with NJ Transit under contract. There are two branches: the Port Jervis Line and the Pascack Valley Line. The Port Jervis Line is accessed from two NJ Transit lines, the Main Line and the Bergen County Line.

The Port Jervis Line terminates in Port Jervis, New York, and the Pascack Valley line in Spring Valley, New York. Trackage on the Port Jervis Line north of the Suffern Yard is leased from the Norfolk Southern Railway by the MTA. NJ Transit owns all of the Pascack Valley Line, including the portion in New York.

Most stops for the Port Jervis and Pascack Valley Lines are in New Jersey, so NJ Transit provides most of the rolling stock and all the staff; Metro-North supplies some equipment. Metro-North equipment has been used on other NJ Transit lines on the Hoboken division.

All stations west of the Hudson River in New York are owned and operated by Metro-North, except Suffern, which is owned and operated by NJ Transit.

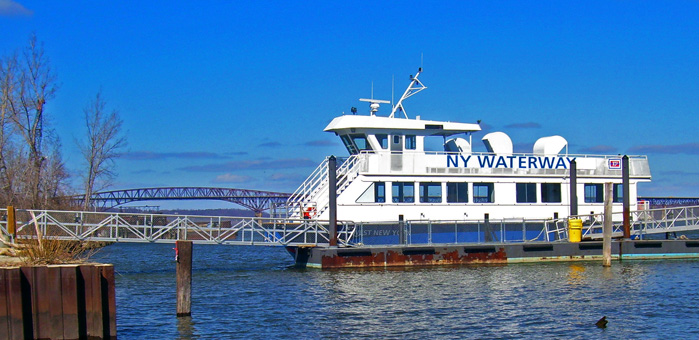
West New York, moored at Beacon

=== Connecting ferry service ===
In partnership with NY Waterway, Metro-North also provides ferry service across the Hudson River to Ossining station via the Haverstraw–Ossining Ferry, operated under contract by NY Waterway. The Newburgh-Beacon Ferry also formerly provided connecting service at Beacon station; it was temporarily replaced by bus service in January 2025, a move that was made permanent the following July.

== History ==
=== Predecessors ===
Most of the trackage east of the Hudson River and in New York State was under the control of the New York Central Railroad (NYC). The NYC initially operated three commuter lines, two of which ran into Grand Central Depot (now Grand Central Terminal). Metro-North's Harlem Line was initially a combination of trackage from the New York and Harlem Railroad and the Boston and Albany Railroad, running from Manhattan to Chatham, New York in Columbia County. At Chatham, passengers could transfer to long-distance trains on the Boston and Albany to Albany, Boston, Vermont, and Canada. On April 1, 1873, the New York and Harlem Railroad was leased by Cornelius Vanderbilt, who added the railroad to his complex empire of railroads, which were run by the NYC. Grand Central Depot, built in 1871, served as the southern terminus of NYC's Harlem and Hudson Divisions; it would be replaced by Grand Central Station in 1900, and by Grand Central Terminal in 1913. The Boston and Albany came under the ownership of NYC in 1914.

NYC's four-track Water Level Route paralleled the Hudson River, Erie Canal, and Great Lakes on a route from New York to Chicago via Albany. It was fast and popular due to the lack of any significant grades. The section between Grand Central and Peekskill, New York, the northernmost station in Westchester County, became known as the NYC's Hudson Division, with frequent commuter service in and out of Manhattan. Stations to the north of Peekskill, such as Poughkeepsie, were considered to be long-distance services. The other major commuter line was the Putnam Division running from 155th Street in upper Manhattan (later from Sedgwick Avenue in the Bronx) to Brewster, New York. Passengers would transfer to the IRT Ninth Avenue Line for midtown and lower Manhattan.

From the mid-19th century until 1969, the New Haven Line, including the New Canaan, Danbury, and Waterbury branches, was owned by the New York, New Haven and Hartford Railroad (NYNH&H). These branches were started in the 1830s with horse-drawn cars, later replaced by steam engines, on a route that connected Lower Manhattan to Harlem. Additional lines started in the mid-19th century included the New York and New Haven Railroad and the Hartford and New Haven Railroad, which provided routes to Hartford, Springfield, Massachusetts, and eventually Boston. The two roads merged in 1872 to become the NYNH&H, growing into the largest passenger and commuter carrier in New England. In the early 20th century, the NYNH&H came under the control of J.P. Morgan. Morgan's bankroll allowed the NYNH&H to modernize by upgrading steam power with both electric (along the New Haven Line) and diesel power (branches and lines to eastern and northern New England). The NYNH&H saw much profitability throughout the 1910s and 1920s until the Great Depression of the 1930s forced it into bankruptcy.

Commuter services west of the Hudson River, today's Port Jervis and Pascack Valley lines, were initially part of the Erie Railroad. The Port Jervis Line, built in the 1850s and 1860s, was originally part of the Erie's mainline from Jersey City, New Jersey to Buffalo, New York. The Pascack Valley Line was built by the New Jersey and New York Railroad, which became a subsidiary of the Erie. Trains that service Port Jervis formerly continued to Binghamton and Buffalo (today used only by freight trains), while Pascack Valley service continued to Haverstraw, New York. In 1956, the Erie Railroad began coordinated service with rival Delaware, Lackawanna, and Western Railroad, and in 1960 they formed the Erie Lackawanna. Trains were rerouted to the Lackawanna's Hoboken Terminal in 1956–1958.

=== Penn Central ===
Passenger rail in the United States began to falter after World War II. Commuter services historically had always been unprofitable, and were usually subsidized by long-distance passenger and freight services. As these profits disappeared, commuter services usually were the first to be affected. Many railroads began to gradually discontinue their commuter lines after the war. By 1958, the NYC had already suspended service on its Putnam Division, while the newly formed Erie Lackawanna, in an effort to make a successful merger, began to prune some of its commuter services. Most New Yorkers still chose the train as their primary means of commuting, making many of the other lines heavily patronized. Thus the NYC, the NYNH&H, and the Erie Lackawanna had to maintain service on these lines. Mergers between railroads were seen as a way to curtail these issues by combining capital and services and creating efficiencies.

In February 1965, New York Governor Nelson Rockefeller and Connecticut Governor John N. Dempsey jointly suggested that operations of the New Haven Line, the New Haven Railroad's struggling commuter rail operation, be transferred to the New York Central Railroad as part of a plan to prevent the New Haven Railroad from going bankrupt. If the operational merger occurred, the proposed Metropolitan Commuter Transit Authority (MCTA; now Metropolitan Transportation Authority, or MTA) and the existing Connecticut Department of Transportation (ConnDOT) would contract with New York Central to operate the New Haven Line to Grand Central Terminal. Due to growing debts, the railroad would have to cease operating passenger trains on the New Haven Line if nothing was done. A joint report from both agencies, released in September of that year, recommended that the line be leased to New York Central for 99 years, with the MCTA and CTA acting as agents for both states. In October, the MCTA found that the New Haven Line's stations and infrastructure were even more decrepit than those of the LIRR. The New Haven Railroad's trustees initially opposed New York Central's takeover of the New Haven Line, as they felt that the $140 million offer for the New Haven Line was too low. After some discussion, the trustees decided to continue operating the New Haven Line, but only until June 1967.

In 1968, following the Erie Lackawanna's example, the NYC and its rival the Pennsylvania Railroad formed Penn Central Transportation with the hope of revitalizing their fortunes. In 1969 the bankrupt NYNH&H was also combined into Penn Central by the Interstate Commerce Commission. However, this merger eventually failed, due to large financial costs, government regulations, corporate rivalries, and lack of a formal merger plan. In 1970 Penn Central declared bankruptcy, at the time the largest corporate bankruptcy ever declared. The same year, the MTA also entered into a long-term lease of Penn Central's Hudson, Harlem, and New Haven Lines. Penn Central continued to operate the now-subsidized lines under contract to the MTA. In April 1970, Rockefeller proposed that the state take over the Hudson and Harlem Lines, and the next month, he signed a bond issue that provided $44.4 million in funding to these lines.

The MTA and ConnDOT acquired the New Haven Line from Penn Central in January 1971. In May 1972, Penn Central also sold the Hudson and Harlem Lines to the MTA. Penn Central continued to operate all three routes under contract to the MTA and ConnDOT. As part of its plan to modernize the commuter lines, the MTA ordered high-speed "Cosmopolitan" railcars for the New Haven Line as well as for the Hudson and Harlem Lines. After a series of delays and derailments in mid-1972, which involved Penn Central trains near Grand Central Terminal, Chairman Ronan expressed his disapproval of the way Penn Central was running its railroads. He said that the proportion of trains running on schedule had declined after Penn Central had inherited the Hudson, Harlem, and New Haven Lines in 1968.

=== Conrail ===
In 1976, Congress awarded the MTA "temporary" funding so the LIRR and Penn Central commuter routes could be handed over to local private operators. The bankrupt Penn Central's commuter routes were taken over by Conrail, an entity created by the federal government, the same year. Many of the other Northeastern railroads, including the Erie Lackawanna, followed Penn Central into bankruptcy, and so they had been merged into Conrail. However, the handover to private owners did not happen.

In March 1981, the administration of President Ronald Reagan suggested that struggling Conrail commuter operations across five states be transferred to state agencies. At the time, Conrail was being floated by the federal government as a private for-profit freight-only carrier. Even with state subsidies, the federal government did not want Conrail to take on the operating costs of the commuter lines, which it was relieved from by the Northeast Rail Service Act of 1981. Thus, it became essential that state-owned agencies both operate and subsidize their commuter services.

Over the next few years commuter lines under the control of Conrail were gradually taken over by state agencies such as the newly formed NJ Transit in New Jersey, the established SEPTA in southeastern Pennsylvania, and Massachusetts Bay Transportation Authority in Boston. In March 1982, the MTA announced it would take over the Harlem, Hudson, and New Haven Lines as long as there was no extra operating cost involved. The MTA and ConnDOT officially took control of the Harlem, Hudson and New Haven Lines on January 1, 1983, and merged them into the Metro-North Commuter Railroad.

=== MTA operation and rebrand ===
Metro-North took over the former Erie Lackawanna services west of the Hudson and north of the New Jersey state line. Since those lines are physically connected to NJ Transit, operations were contracted to NJ Transit with Metro-North subsidizing the service and supplying equipment.

In preparation for the takeover, Metro-North was created as a division of the MTA, with Peter Stangl as president. Once under the MTA's control, the agency planned to phase in capital improvements over the following five years. As part of the transition, the MTA needed to negotiate new labor contracts with the 17 unions representing 5,000 Conrail employees who would become MTA employees and had to negotiate the transfer of most of Conrail's assets.

Much work was needed in reorganization, as significant business success would not appear for at least two decades, following the faltering railroad industry in the 1970s. Conrail and later Metro-North had decided to trim whatever services they felt were unnecessary. A significant portion of the old New York Central Central Harlem line between Millerton and Chatham, New York was abandoned by Conrail, leaving northeastern Dutchess and Columbia counties with no rail transportation. Most commuter lines were kept in service although they were in much need of repair.

==== Strike ====
On March 7, 1983, after labor negotiations between the MTA and the United Transportation Union (UTU) broke off, Metro-North employees went on strike. Commuters were left to carpool or use shuttle buses running to subway stations in the Bronx. Metro-North wanted to eliminate minimum staffing requirements and wanted the complete freedom to assign crews–a demand that the employees would not agree to. This was the first strike to shut down the New Haven, Harlem, and Hudson at the same time since January 1961. The UTU also went on strike against NJ Transit, which took over Conrail lines in New Jersey, and against SEPTA in Philadelphia. Two weeks into the strike, Metro-North President Peter Stangl estimated that it lost $80,000 a week due to the strike. The chairman of the MTA's finance committee, Stephen Berger, feared that Metro-North would lose 5% of its pre-strike ridership of 90,000–costing the railroad $1.3 million.

Richard Ravitch, the MTA Chairman, asked President Reagan to seek legislation to place the dispute under the law of New York State. Even though Metro-North was a state agency, the workers remained under federal law because Conrail was a federal agency. Reagan had turned down a request by Governor Mario Cuomo to intervene, but indicated that he would listen if a congressionally approved proposal was issued. The strike lasted six weeks, and ended on April 18 when the two sides agreed to binding arbitration.

==== Initial investments ====
The first major project undertaken by Metro-North was the extension of the third-rail electrification on the Harlem line from North White Plains to a new station at Brewster North (since renamed Southeast). This was completed in 1984. During the late 1980s and early 1990s, all wayside signals that did not protect switches and interlockings north of Grand Central were removed and replaced by modern cab signaling.

In October 1998, the New York State Department of Transportation announced that the Newburgh–Beacon Shuttle would be developed in conjunction with Metro-North, running from the Beacon station on the Hudson Line to the Newburgh park-and-ride on Route 17K.

==== Recent initiatives ====
Metro-North spent the better part of its early days updating and repairing its infrastructure. Stations, track, and rolling stock all needed to be repaired, renovated, or replaced. The railroad succeeded and by the mid 90s gained both respect and monetary success, according to the MTA's website. 2006 was the best year for the division, with a 97.8% rate of on-time trains, record ridership (76.9 million people), and a passenger satisfaction rating of 92%. In December 2017, the MTA announced that the Metro-North Railroad stations at White Plains, Harlem–125th Street, Crestwood, Port Chester, and Riverdale, would receive a complete overhaul as part of the Enhanced Station Initiative and would be entirely closed for up to 6 months. Updates would include cellular service, Wi-Fi, USB charging stations, interactive service advisories, and maps.

The Harlem and Hudson lines and the Park Avenue mainline to Grand Central were previously owned by Midtown TDR Ventures LLC, who bought them from the corporate successors to Penn Central. The MTA had a lease extending to the year 2274 and an option to buy starting in 2017. The MTA exercised their option to buy what was now Argent Ventures' rail assets on November 13, 2018. Under the terms of the deal, the MTA purchased Grand Central Terminal, as well as the Hudson Line from Grand Central to a point 2 miles (3.2 km) north of Poughkeepsie, and the Harlem Line from Grand Central to Dover Plains. In October 2025, the MTA announced that it planned to extend one daily Hudson Line round-trip northward to Albany–Rensselaer station beginning in early 2026. This was later cancelled in January 2026 as Amtrak agreed to restore trains in March of the same year.

== Infrastructure ==
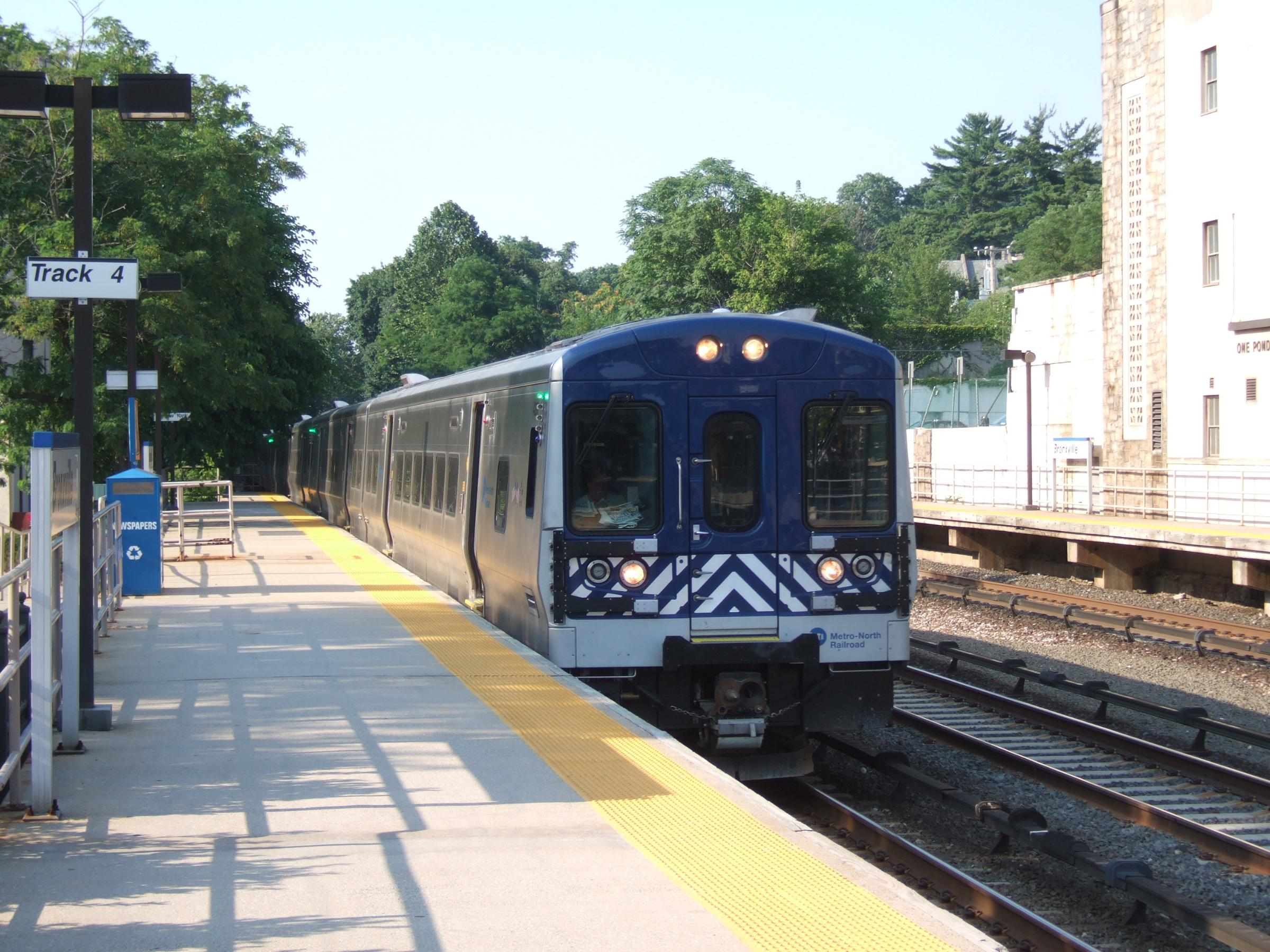
An M7 train at Bronxville on the Harlem Line.

=== East of Hudson ===
==== Propulsion systems ====
Most services running into Grand Central Terminal are electrically powered.

Diesel trains into Grand Central use General Electric P32AC-DM electro-diesel locomotives capable of switching to a pure electric mode. These locomotives have contact shoes compatible with Metro-North's under-running 750 V DC third rail power distribution system. Shoreliner series coaches are used in push-pull operation.

On the Hudson Line, local trains between Grand Central and Croton–Harmon are powered by third rail. Through trains to Poughkeepsie are diesel powered and do not require a change of locomotive at Croton-Harmon. The Harlem Line has third rail from Grand Central Terminal to Southeast and trains are powered by diesel north to Wassaic. At most times, passengers between Southeast and Wassaic must change at Southeast to a diesel train powered by Brookville BL20-GH locomotives. Electric service on the Hudson and Harlem lines uses M3 and M7 MU cars.

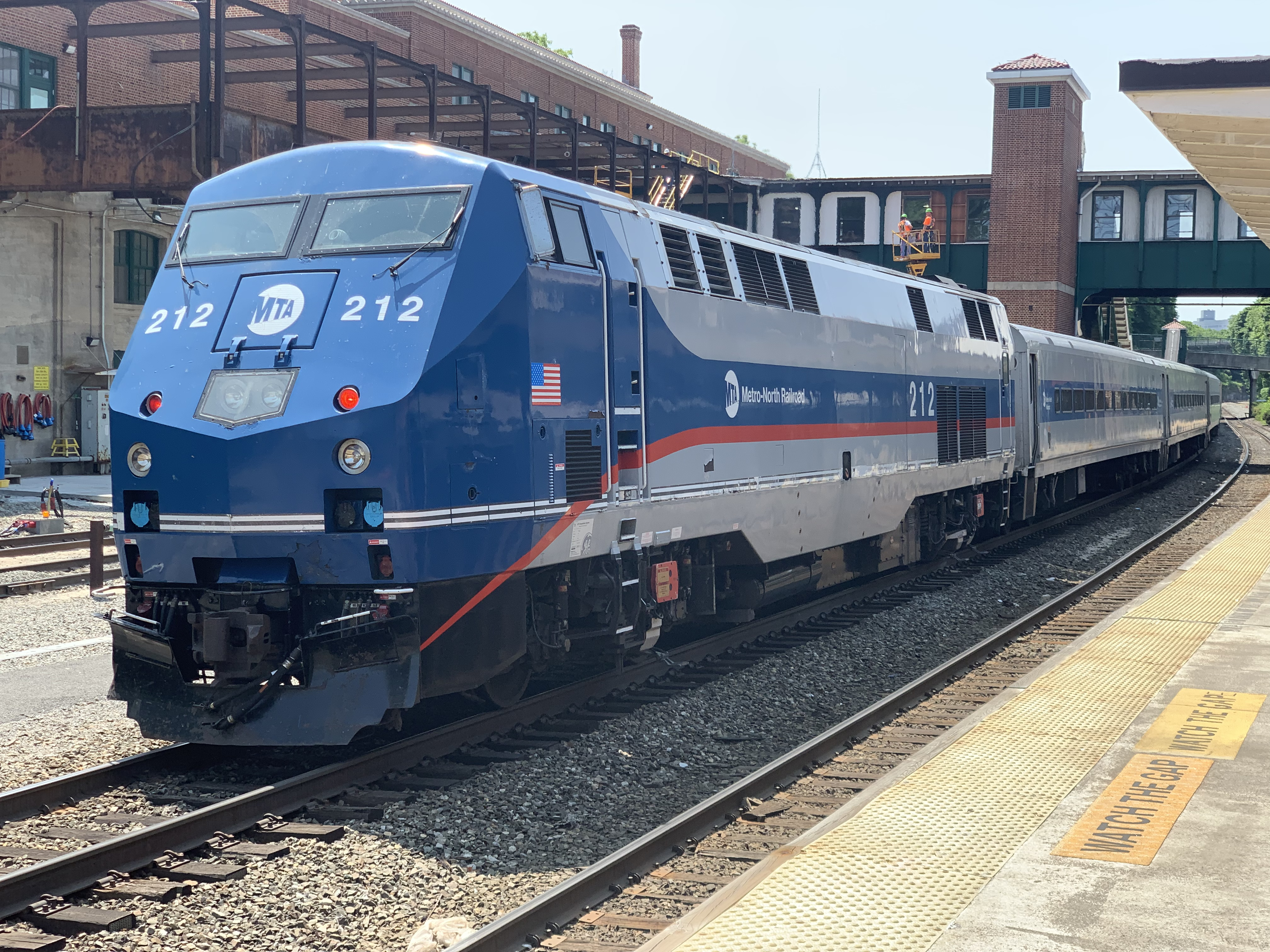
A GE P32AC-DM locomotive at Poughkeepsie in 2023

The New Haven Line is unique in that trains use both third rail and 12.5 kV AC from overhead catenary. The line from Grand Central Terminal to Mount Vernon East uses third rail, while the section from Pelham east to New Haven State Street, which is 58 miles (93 km), uses overhead catenary. These electrification systems overlap between Mount Vernon East and Pelham stations and trains change power systems from one to the other while running between the stations. Multi-system M8 railcars equipped with third rail shoes and pantographs are used for electric service on the line.

The New Canaan Branch also uses overhead catenary. The Danbury Branch was electrified, but became a diesel line in 1961. The Waterbury Branch, the only east-of-Hudson Metro-North service which has no direct service to Grand Central, is diesel only.

Power is collected from the bottom of the third rail as opposed to the top, used by other third rail systems, including the Long Island Rail Road and New York City Subway. This system is known as the Wilgus-Sprague third rail, and the SEPTA Market–Frankford Line in Philadelphia and Metro-North are the only two systems in North America that use it. It allows the third rail to be completely insulated from above, thus decreasing the chances of a person being electrocuted by coming in contact with the rail. It also reduces the impact of icing in winter.

==== Signaling and safety appliances ====
The Hudson, Harlem and New Haven lines and the New Canaan branch and all passenger rolling stock is equipped with cab signalling, which displays the appropriate block signal in the engineer's cab. All rolling stock is equipped with Automatic Train Control (ATC), which enforces the speed dictated by the cab signal by a penalty brake application should the engineer fail to obey it. There are no intermediate wayside signals between interlockings: operation is solely by cab signal. Wayside signals remain at interlockings. These are a special type of signal, a go, a slow or a stop signal. They do not convey information about traffic in the blocks ahead – the cab signal conveys block information.

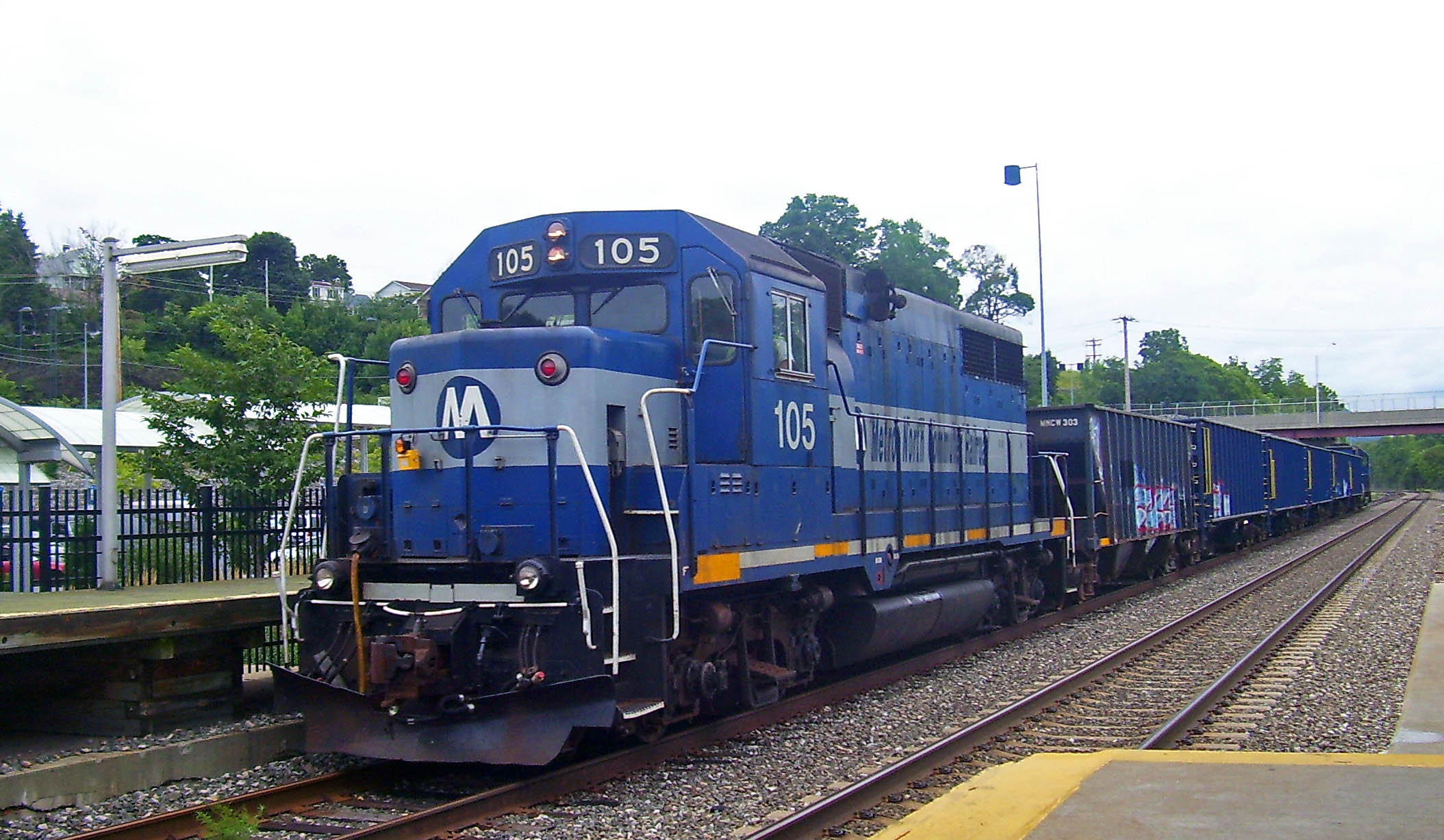
Metro-North maintenance train going through Beacon on the Hudson Line.

Metro-North began upgrading its Operations Control Center in Grand Central Terminal in 2008. All control hardware was replaced and software upgrades were performed. The new OCC at Grand Central opened over the weekend of July 18, 2010.

=== West of Hudson ===
Most of the rolling stock on west-of-Hudson lines consists of Metro-North owned and marked Comet V cars, although occasionally other NJ Transit (NJT) cars are used as the two railroads pool equipment. The trains are also usually handled by EMD GP40FH-2, GP40PH-2, F40PH-3C, Alstom PL42AC, or Bombardier ALP-45DP locomotives, although any Metro-North or NJ Transit diesel can show up. Metro-North owned and marked equipment operated by NJ Transit can also be seen on other NJ Transit lines.

== Rolling stock ==
The Harlem Line and Hudson Line use a combination of M3A and M7 electric multiple units, similar to those used on the Long Island Rail Road. The New Haven Line uses M8 EMUs, which have the ability to switch between third rail and catenary wire. Diesel locomotives and push-pull units are used on the non-electrified portions of the network.

Although Metro-North uses many abbreviations (MNCR, MNR, MN, etc.) the only official reporting marks registered and recognized on AEI scanner tags is 'MNCW'. Rolling stock owned by the Connecticut Department of Transportation bears the CTDOT seal and either the New Haven ("NH") logo or the MTA logo and is identified using the reporting mark 'CNDX'.

== Fare policies ==
Metro-North offers many different ticket types and prices depending on the frequency of travel and distance of the ride. While the fare policies of the east of Hudson and west of Hudson divisions are essentially the same, west of Hudson trains are operated by NJ Transit using its ticketing system.

=== East of Hudson ===
Tickets may be bought from a ticket office at stations, ticket vending machines (TVMs), online through the "WebTicket" program or through apps for iOS and Android devices, or on the train. Monthly tickets may be bought through the MTA's "Mail&Ride" program where monthly passes are delivered by mail. There is a discount for buying tickets online and through Mail&Ride. A surcharge is added if a ticket is purchased on a train.

Ticket types available include One-way, Round-trip (two One-way tickets), 10-trip, Weekly (unlimited travel for one calendar week), Monthly (unlimited travel for one calendar month), and special student and disabled fare tickets. MetroCards are available on the reverse side of the Round-trip, Weekly, and Monthly tickets.

All tickets to/from Manhattan (Grand Central Terminal and Harlem–125th Street) are distinguished as being peak or off-peak. Peak fares, substantially higher than off-peak, apply on weekdays to travel to Manhattan on trains that arrive in Grand Central between 6 am and 10 am, and to travel from Manhattan on trains that leave Grand Central between 6 am and 9 am and 4 pm and 8 pm. Note that peak fares do not apply to travel to Manhattan on trains that arrive in Grand Central during the afternoon/evening rush hour. Off-peak fares are charged at all other times on weekdays, and off-peak fares are charged all day Saturdays, Sundays, and holidays. Tickets for travel outside Manhattan, including tickets for travel to/from the Bronx, are called Intermediate tickets and are not subject to peak fares.

Metro-North stations are split between 14 zones in New York state. In Connecticut, the fare structure is more complex due to the many branches on the New Haven Line. Generally, these zones correspond to express stops on the lines and from "blocks" of service within the schedules.

In 2017, it was announced that the MetroCard fare payment system, used on New York City-area rapid transit and bus systems, would be phased out and replaced by OMNY, a contactless fare payment system. Fare payment would be made using Apple Pay, Google Wallet, debit/credit cards with near-field communication enabled, or radio-frequency identification cards. As part of the implementation of OMNY, the MTA also plans to use the system in the Long Island Rail Road and Metro-North Railroad.

==== CityTicket ====
In 2003, the LIRR and Metro-North started a pilot program in which passengers traveling within New York City were allowed to buy one-way tickets for $2.50. The special reduced-fare CityTicket, proposed by the New York City Transit Riders Council, was formally introduced in 2004. The discounted fares were initially only available for travel on Saturdays and Sundays. In March 2022, it was expanded to include all off-peak trains throughout the week for $5. The MTA announced plans in December 2022 to allow CityTickets to be used on peak trains as well; governor Kathy Hochul confirmed these plans the next month. The peak CityTickets, as announced in July 2023, would cost $7 each. As part of a one-year pilot program starting in July 2024, monthly tickets for Metro-North trips entirely within New York City would also receive a 10% discount.

CityTicket is valid for travel that begins and ends within New York City. CityTickets can only be bought before boarding, except at Willets Point on the Long Island Rail Road where they can be purchased on board, and they must be used on the day of purchase.

Metro-North stations that qualify for the CityTicket
All Lines	Grand Central Terminal
All Lines	Harlem-125th Street
Hudson Line	Yankees-153rd Street
Hudson Line	Morris Heights
Hudson Line	University Heights
Hudson Line	Spuyten Duyvil
Hudson Line	Riverdale
Harlem Line	Melrose
Harlem Line	Tremont
Harlem and New Haven Lines	Fordham
Harlem Line	Botanical Garden
Harlem Line	Williams Bridge
Harlem Line	Woodlawn
Harlem Line	Wakefield

=== West of Hudson ===
All West of Hudson stations are included in NJ Transit's fare structure, and a single ticket may be purchased for travel between any two stations on either system.

== Plans ==
=== East of Hudson ===
==== Hudson Line ====
On May 23, 2009, Metro-North opened Yankees–East 153rd Street, a station with direct, game-day "Yankee Clipper" trains from all East of Hudson lines. Trains from the New Haven and Harlem lines gain access via the wye at Mott Haven Junction, the first time that scheduled revenue service has operated across this section of the wye.

Northward expansion of the Hudson Line has often met opposition from residents of communities including Hyde Park and Rhinecliff, even though the latter is home to Amtrak's Rhinecliff station, frequented by commuters from northern Dutchess and northern Ulster Counties. Supervisors of some towns north of Poughkeepsie began expressing interest in extending rail service in 2007.

On October 20, 2025, it was announced by Governor Kathy Hochul that Metro-North service on the Hudson line will be extended north from Poughkeepsie to Albany–Rensselaer in 2026. In January 2026, Governor Kathy Hochul announced, "With the full restoration of Empire Service, Amtrak has notified New York State and the MTA that it will no longer sanction temporary Metro-North service to Albany at this time."

==== Harlem Line ====
There are plans to redevelop the former Wingdale Psychiatric Center into a mixed-use commercial and residential neighborhood known as Dover Knolls, centered around the Harlem Valley–Wingdale station.

Northward expansion took place most recently when it was extended from Dover Plains to Wassaic in 2000, requiring a costly rebuilding of tracks that had been abandoned years before. Going further north would require substantial investment to rebuild tracks, grade crossings, stations and other facilities that were removed long ago, and obtaining eminent domain for the train property used by the Harlem Valley Rail Trail. Expansion of either line would probably be limited to Dutchess County, as extending Metro-North into Columbia County, and thus to Chatham, would require changes to the MTA charter, and residents of that county would become subject to the MTA tax.

In 2014, Metro-North officials announced that they would be installing security cameras at all stations on the Harlem and New Haven Lines in order to address public safety concerns. These concerns arose from an incident on September 29, 2013, where the body of 17-year-old Mount Saint Michael Academy student Matthew Wallace was found on the tracks of the Wakefield station. Wallace, who was inebriated at the time, was killed when a northbound train struck him while he was standing on the platform. Due to the lack of cameras at the station, footage of his death did not exist.

==== New Haven Line ====
Discussions are underway to re-electrify the Danbury Branch with a concurrent expansion to New Milford. As of January 2025, a bill to initiate the project has made its way to the Connecticut General Assembly, although similar bills have been introduced 9 times. Connecticut officials and Metro-North also began construction of a new station in West Haven in November 2010. It was opened on August 18, 2013. CTDOT is also moving forward on a study to increase freight service on the New Haven Line in an effort to reduce the number of trucks on the congested Connecticut Turnpike. Metro-North has upgraded most of the original 1907–1914 New Haven Railroad catenary system, a project begun in the early 1990s and scheduled to finish in mid-2018. The Danbury Branch is to receive $30 million for station upgrades along the line as well as implementation of a new signal system.

Plans to extend the Waterbury Branch northeast from Waterbury are under discussion. The extension would bring passenger rail service to central Connecticut, including the two largest cities in Connecticut without passenger rail service, Bristol and New Britain, and on to Hartford, where transfers to Amtrak would be possible.

In 2014, Metro-North officials announced that they would be installing security cameras at all stations on the Harlem and New Haven Lines in order to address public safety concerns.

==== Penn Station Access ====
In September 2009, Metro-North announced plans for a $1.7 million environmental impact statement on accessing Penn Station; although this possibility had been considered for several decades, it was never pursued because there was no space for any more trains in Penn Station. The project therefore depended upon the completion of East Side Access, which redirected some Long Island Rail Road trains from Penn Station to Grand Central upon its completion in early 2023. Weekday Metro-North service in the Bronx includes 253 daily trains with approximately 13,200 daily boardings. In addition, Metro-North also connects 5,000 Bronx residents to suburban jobs, making it the largest rail reverse-commute market in the United States. Governor Andrew Cuomo publicly and strongly supported the project in January 2014.

New Haven Line trains would enter the Hell Gate Line through New Rochelle. At Sunnyside Yards, they would enter Manhattan via the East River Tunnels. Stations would be built at Co-op City, Morris Park, Parkchester/Van Nest, and Hunts Point. Open houses were held at each of the four proposed stations in the Fall of 2012. Stations would be wheelchair-accessible, with bicycle parking and multi-modal transfer areas to train or bus. Cuomo endorsed the New Haven Line portion of the Penn Station Access project in his 2014 State of the State speech, stating that some Sandy recovery money could pay for the project's cost of over $1 billion. He did not mention the Hudson Line portion of the project.

On October 28, 2015, the MTA Board of Directors approved a 2015–2019 Capital Program which included $695 million in planned spending for the Penn Station Access project. Upon completion of the Environmental Review process, Metro-North will design and implement the track and structural work needed to operate on the Hell Gate Bridge and its approaches in the Bronx and Queens; communications and signals work; power improvements, including third rail, power substations, and catenary; construction of the four stations in the Bronx; and rolling stock specification development for the fleet needed to operate the service. A groundbreaking ceremony for Penn Station Access took place in the Bronx on December 9, 2022.

Service is planned to begin in 2027 at the earliest. The opening of East Side Access in 2023 diverted some Long Island Rail Road trains to Grand Central Madison, therefore opening up slots at Penn Station for Metro-North service. During peak hours there will be between six and ten trains on the New Haven Line to Penn Station. There will be four trains per hour to Connecticut in the reverse peak direction, and there will be two trains per hour to and from Penn Station during off-peak and weekends.

=== West of Hudson ===
The MTA was working with the Tappan Zee Bridge Environmental Review on several options where the replacement for the Tappan Zee Bridge would have included a rail line to connect the Pascack Valley Line in Rockland County to the Hudson Line in Westchester County. A proposed bus rapid transit system using the new bridge was shelved as too expensive, but the bridge was structurally built for expansion with BRT and/or commuter rail at a later date. This is now part of a dedicated bus lane system planned to go into service in late 2018.

Metro-North is considering extending Port Jervis Line service to Stewart International Airport in Newburgh, a move that could make a Tappan Zee Bridge rail line even more useful, as it would serve both commuters and travelers who choose to fly to and from Stewart, instead of the three major New York City-area airports.

== Major accidents ==
- On February 17, 1987, at about 7:05 PM, a slowly moving 14-car Metro-North Hudson Line train collided with an empty Metro-North train returning to Grand Central on an elevated stretch of tracks at 140th Street and Park Avenue in the Bronx. Twenty passengers were injured in the accident, none of them seriously.
- On April 6, 1988, at 7:59 AM, a northbound Metro-North train collided with another Metro-North train in Mount Vernon, New York, resulting in the death of an engineer. Both trains were empty at the time of the collision.
- On May 17, 2013, at 6:01 PM EDT during the evening rush hour, two trains collided when an eastbound train derailed in Bridgeport, Connecticut just east of the Fairfield Metro station blocking the adjacent track just as a westbound train passed traveling in the opposite direction. At least sixty passengers were injured, including five with critical injuries. It also caused a major disruption to other rail service in the Northeast Corridor. Amtrak halted all service between New York City and Boston.
- On December 1, 2013, at 7:19 AM EST, seven passenger cars and a diesel locomotive from Poughkeepsie to Grand Central Terminal derailed in the Spuyten Duyvil section of the Bronx, killing four people and injuring 65, 12 of them critically. At least three cars out of seven were flipped over on their sides. The train was traveling into the curve at an excessive speed of 82 mph (132 km/h) in a 30 mph (48 km/h) curve. Amtrak's Empire Service was halted until 3:00 PM, and Hudson Line service was suspended until December 4.
- On February 3, 2015, at about 6:30 PM EST, a train on the Harlem Line hit a sport utility vehicle at a railroad crossing in Valhalla, New York, killing its 49-year-old driver Ellen Brody instantly upon impact. The fuel tank of the car was ruptured, causing the car and the train to catch on fire, after the electrified and live 700 volt DC underrunning third rail was pulled up and punctured through the roof of the first 2 cars. The accident killed six people, injured 12, and forced the evacuation of hundreds of people aboard the train. The National Transportation Safety Board led an investigation of the accident.

== See also ==
- Long Island Rail Road
- List of Metro-North Railroad stations
- Transportation in New York City
- Transportation in New York State
