= North White Plains station =

Metro-North Railroad station in New York

North White Plains
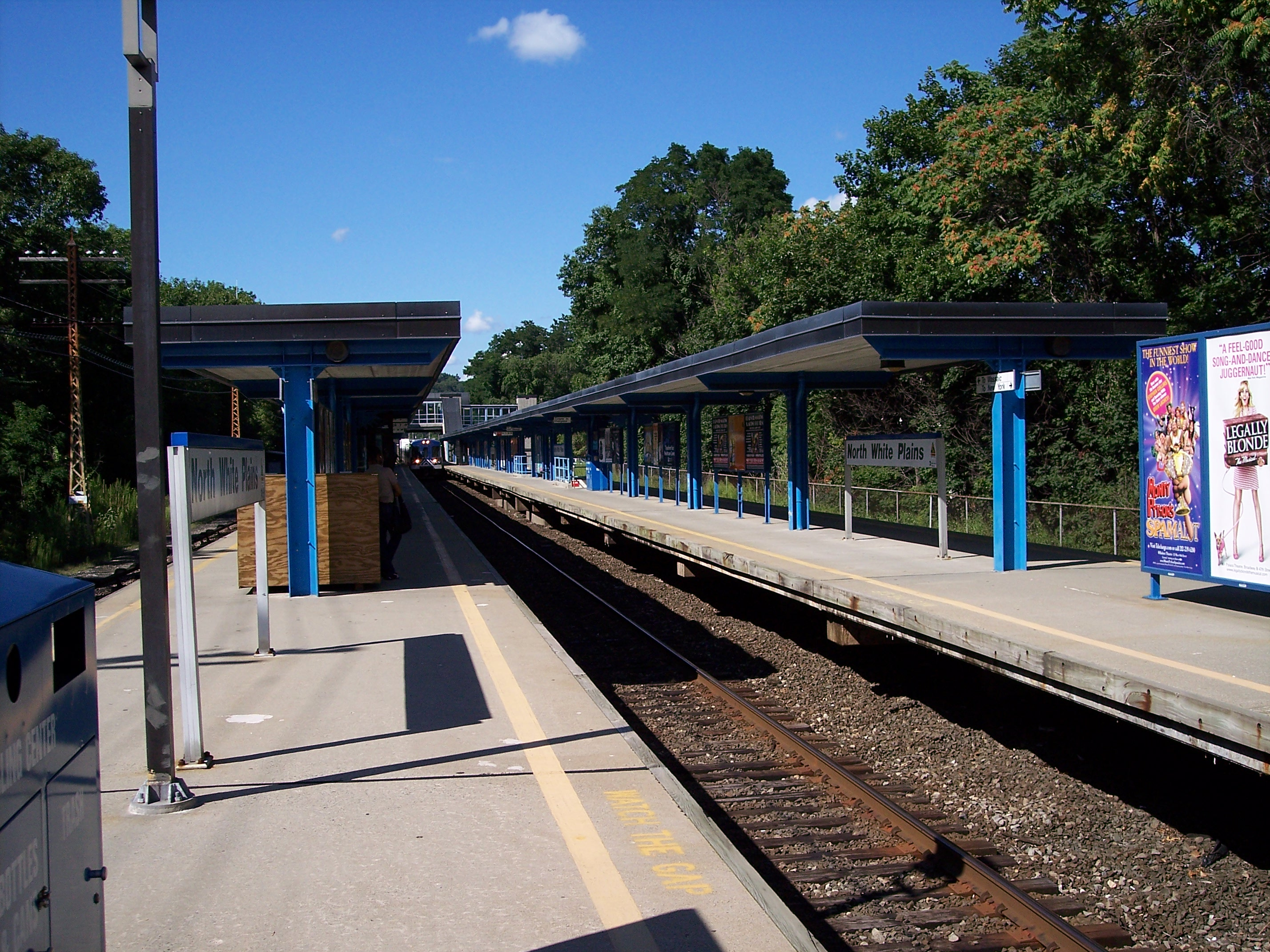
- Northbound view of the middle track at North White Plains station from the southbound platform.

General information
- Location: 1 Harlem Avenue, White Plains, New York
- Coordinates: 41°3′5″N 73°46′21″W
- Line: Harlem Line
- Platforms: 2 island platforms
- Tracks: 3
- Connections: Bee-Line Bus System: 6

Construction
- Parking: 1,182 spaces
- Accessible: yes

Other information
- Fare zone: 4

History
- Opened: 1972
- Electrified: 700V (DC) third rail

Passengers
- 2018: 2,734 (Metro-North)
- Rank: 22 of 109

Services
| Preceding station | Metro-North Railroad | Following station |
|---|---|---|
| White Plains toward Grand Central | Harlem Line | Terminus |
| White Plains toward Grand Central | Harlem Line | Valhalla toward Southeast |
| White Plains toward Grand Central | Harlem Line | Chappaqua toward Wassaic |

Former services
| Preceding station | New York Central Railroad | Following station |
|---|---|---|
| White Plains toward New York | Harlem Division | Valhalla toward Chatham |
Location

North White Plains station is a commuter rail stop on the Metro-North Railroad's Harlem Line, located in the North White Plains neighborhood of White Plains, New York. It is the north terminal for most trains that run local to the south and, until 1984, was the northern limit of electrification.

== History ==
North White Plains station was originally built in 1972 by the Penn Central Railroad as a replacement for the former New York Central Railroad-built Holland Avenue station, a low-level northbound-only side platform located near the south end of the current station. It contained both high-level and low-level platforms, until electrification was expanded north of the station. Once Penn Central was dissolved in 1976, Conrail took responsibility for commuter service, until the Metropolitan Transportation Authority officially established Metro-North Railroad in 1983, making the station and the line part of the new railroad.

With the extension of electrification in 1984 to Brewster North, this was no longer the northern limit of electrification on the Harlem Line.

On October 5, 2015, MTA opened a new five story parking garage for the station at the southeast corner of Bond Street and Haarlem Avenue.

== Station layout ==
The station has two slightly offset high-level island platforms, each 12 cars long. Adjacent to the station is a yard/support facility for trains, one of two on the line (Southeast is the other).
