= History of Darien, Connecticut =

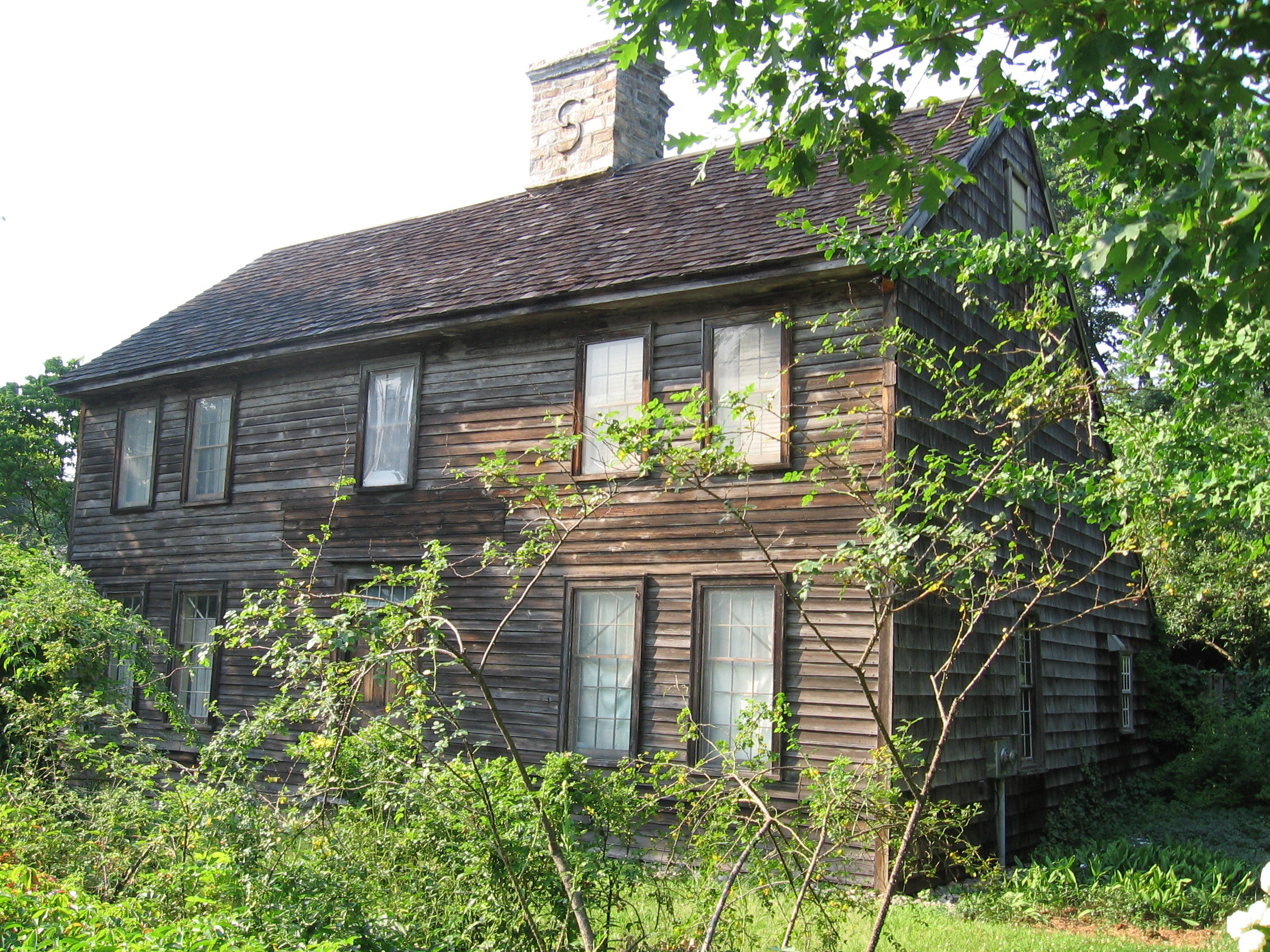
The ca. 1700 Pond-Weed House saltbox on the Post Road in Noroton is the oldest home in Darien

The history of Darien, Connecticut, has been shaped by its location on the shore of Long Island Sound along the main route from Boston to New York City, initially with sailing ships and dirt roads for transportation, and later with locomotives and highways.

== Colonial times ==
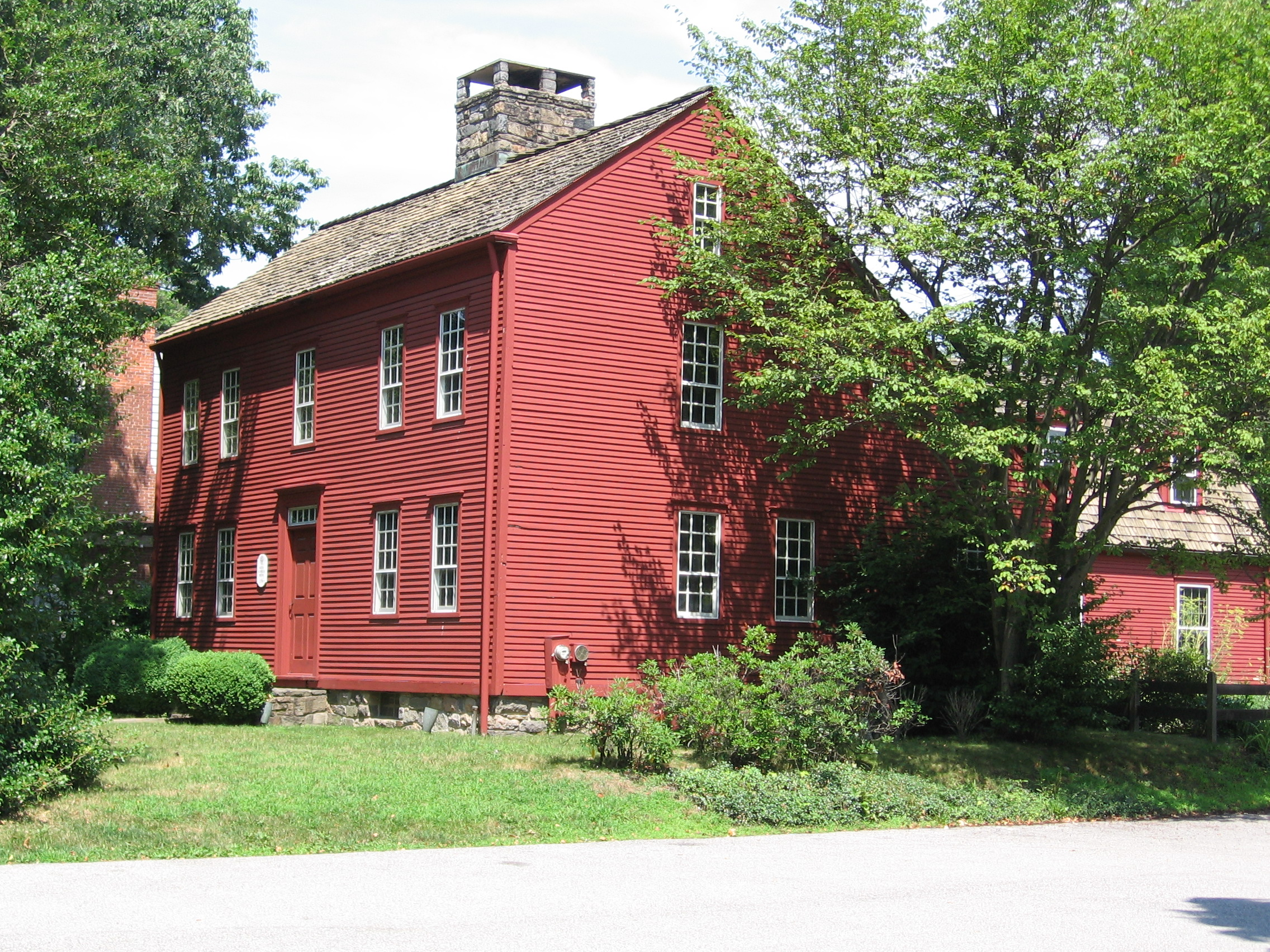
Bates-Scofield House, Darien Historical Society headquarters and museum

The Siwanoy, an Algonquian-speaking sachemdom (or subtribe) of the Wappinger tribe, originally occupied Darien and the surrounding area. The Siwanoy controlled what is now much of the Bronx, Westchester County and the Connecticut "panhandle" as far east as Norwalk and part of Wilton.

The land that became Darien was a part of Stamford from the time Stamford was bought from the Indians until Darien was incorporated as a town in 1820. Settlement began in the late 17th century with permission from Stamford authorities to start building roads cut "in the woods". Originally, settlers congregated in three areas: around "Noroton Cove" (now Holly Pond) in the southwest corner of town, settled in the 1680s; Gorham's Landing on the Goodwives River in the south-central part of town; and at the head of the Five Mile River, where the town today borders Norwalk.

The Noroton Cove settlement included a sawmill built by a dam on the Noroton River (a large stream and now the Darien-Stamford border) just north of where Interstate 95 crosses the river. A small shipyard was founded on the shore of Holly Pond near the present site of the Darien YMCA. A local blacksmith, Nathaniel Pond, owned a home built in about 1696 in saltbox style at the corner of what is now the Boston Post Road (U.S. Route 1) and Hollow Tree Ridge Road. It is now the oldest house in town.

In 1690, the Five Mile River settlement was started when John Reed and his son built a sawmill where today's Old Kings Highway crosses the river.

In 1703 a school district was set up in Noroton at what is now the southwest corner of Nearwater Lane and the Boston Post Road. The Hindley School is now across the street from the site, which is owned by the Noroton Fire Department. Five years later Scofield's Mill (afterward called Gorham's Mill) was built on the Goodwives River.

=== Moses Mather and Middlesex Parish ===
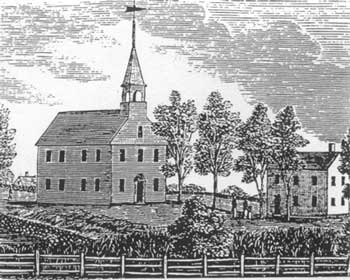
Middlesex Parish Meetinghouse by John Warner Barber, 1837 (built 1744)

In the late 1730s severe winters led to the death of some people from Darien trying to get to church in Stamford. That led to a proposal to create a new, closer parish. It took seven years of deliberations, especially over what salary the new preacher would receive: the amount finally settled on was 46 pounds and a variety of produce. More deliberations resulted in the hiring of the Rev. Moses Mather (born in 1719), a Yale graduate (Class of 1739) originally from Lyme, where his father was a sea captain. He was hired for a two-year probationary period, officially became minister in 1744 while still in his mid-20s, and spent his entire 64-year career at the post, until his death in 1806.

The church that later became known as the First Congregational Church held its first meeting on June 15, 1739. Also that year, a meetinghouse was built.

Mather married three times and fathered to a total of 10 children. He first married Hannah Bell, of Darien, on September 10, 1746. After her death, Elizabeth Whiting followed, and after her death Rebecca Raymond.

Like most ministers in western Connecticut, Mather was an "Old Light" preacher, less interested in the emotional style of worship taken up by the "New Lights" more prevalent in eastern Connecticut. He was intellectually inclined and public spirited, with an interest in Enlightenment principals as they applied to politics. During and before the American Revolution he was the most vigorous promoter of the Patriot cause from the pulpit of any of the nearby parishes.

"There is a pre-Revolutionary broadside attributed to Rev. Mather," according to Marian M. Castellon who delivered a lecture on Mather in 2001. "In 1764 he delivered an election sermon in Hartford, America's Appeal to the Impartial World, in which he deals with Patriotism, Described and Recommended, and how America should fight for the rights of all freemen."

According to Castellon, Mather "was described as 'of medium height, slender, distinguished for learning, piety, free and easy in conversation, with a good business sense.' He had great humor and tremendous patriotism, and stood out in a crowd because a long Quaker like coat he always wore."

Mather was a fellow at Yale from 1777 to 1790 and in 1791 he received a doctor of divinity degree from Princeton (formerly College of New Jersey).

== Middlesex Parish in the American Revolution ==
Near the start of the American Revolution, General George Washington and 19,000 of his men marched from Boston to New York City, passing through Middlesex Parish. The main road then was the route that was named "Old Kings Highway" in the early 20th century, although back then it was called the Country Road in Middlesex Parish (the Country Road followed the route of the present Post Road west of the intersection of the Post Road and present Old Kings Highway and east of that it ran along the route of today's Old Kings Highway). It becomes Flax Hill Road in Norwalk, another part of the route Washington's army followed.

During the American Revolution, Middlesex Parish was controlled by Patriots but frequently raided by local Tories who had fled to British-controlled Lloyd's Neck on Long Island. Often, their property had been confiscated and the raids offered them vengeance, recompense or both. They would row across the Sound on whaleboats to steal food and clothes for their families. The raids could be deadly, and on foggy or moonless nights Patriots had to keep especially wary.

At about the time of the American Revolution, Middlesex Parish had 67 Anglican families and 86 who were members of the Middlesex Society (the Congregational church). Anglicans tended to be Tories while Congregationalists tended toward the Patriot cause.

Shortly after the raid at the meetinghouse, on the night of Aug 2, 1781, another raid took place. Hoping to ambush the Tories, Patriots hid behind a stone wall at the southeast corner of Nearwater Lane and the Boston Post Road. But the Tories got wind of the impending ambush and sneaked up themselves behind a wall on the opposite side. Gunfire ensued and when the smoke cleared several men were dead on both sides. The Tories were able to get to shore to row back across the sound in their whaleboats.

On July 4, 1778, the Rev. Mather's son, Joseph, along with his wife and daughter, moved into the home he had just built on the northwest corner of what is now Mansfield Road and Brookside Road (then called "Gracious Street"). Since it was farther from the shore, the family thought they would be safe from Tory raiders, and Mrs. Mather encouraged friends and family to store valuables there for the duration of the war. That was a mistake.

One night in March 1781, Tories went up Brookside Road and robbed the place, forcing the Mathers to reveal where the cache was stashed. Legend has it that they even forced Mrs. Mather to cook supper for them. Several neighbors on Brookside Road had sent sons off to fight in the war—for the British—and that may have been how the Tories heard about the good pickings.

== Early Nineteenth century ==
According to the Darien Historical Society, the name Darien was decided upon when the residents of the town could not agree on a name to replace Middlesex Parish, many families wanting it to be named after themselves. A sailor who had traveled to Darién, Panama, then part of Colombia, suggested the name Darien, which was eventually adopted.

Until the advent of the railroad in 1848, Darien remained a small, rural community of about 1,000 farmers, shoemakers, fishermen, and merchants engaged in coastal trading. By the 1790s, Holly Pond was no longer fully open to the Sound, but at Gorham's Landing, where Rings End Road meets the Goodwives River, small sailing vessels from New York, Eastern Connecticut and even the West Indies would pull up during high tide for trade with local merchants.

In what is now the Hindley School playing fields, close to the Boston Post Road, a "Union Chapel" was created in the 1830s for religious groups other than the original Congregationalists. St. Luke's Episcopal Church (organized August 30, 1855) and the Darien Methodist Church (organized by the 1860s) grew out of meetings there. Across the street, the Noroton Presbyterian Church was organized on November 4, 1863. Union Chapel was no longer around when Irish Roman Catholics founded St. John Church next door in 1888.

The Darien train station was opened at about the same time as the one in Rowayton, and was later followed by the establishment of a train station in Noroton Heights and one in the Glenbrook section of Stamford.

== Late Nineteenth century ==
In 1864 during the Civil War, the first home for disabled veterans and soldier's orphans in the United States was built on a 19-acre (77,000 m^{2}) tract at Noroton Heights. It was named after its founder, Benjamin Fitch of Darien, who funded almost the entire project. the state provided limited aid until 1883. In 1887 the state took over control and formally named the institution "Fitch's Home for Soldiers." The home, which housed veterans and the children of veterans, was dedicated July 4, 1864. Veterans of the Civil War, then the Spanish–American War and finally World War I were cared for at the home. After World War II the institution's services were transferred to the larger Veterans Home and Hospital Rocky Hill, Connecticut.

Pictures of Fitch home from a March 17, 1866, Harper's Weekly:

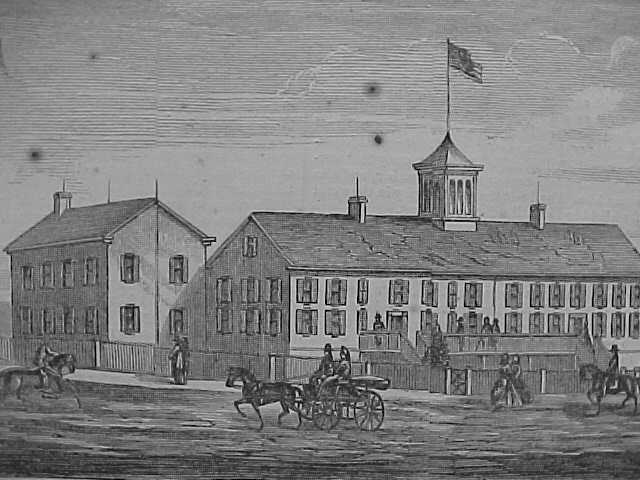
Fitch Home

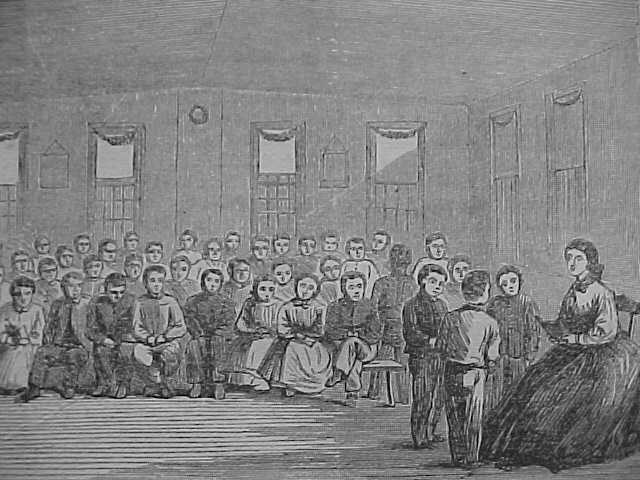
School room at the Fitch Home

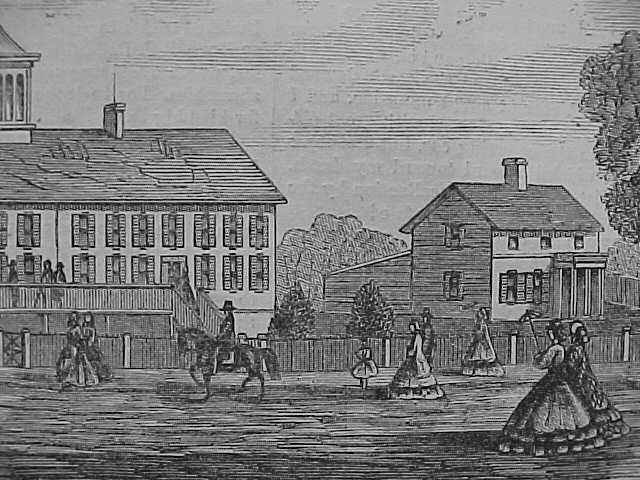
"The Returned Soldier" at the Fitch Home

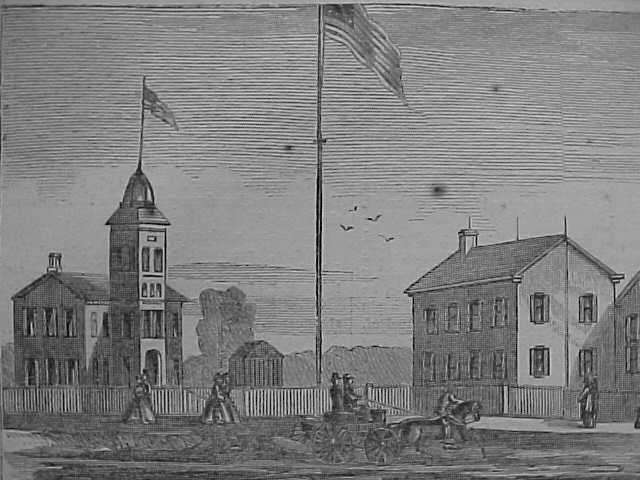
View of Fitch Home

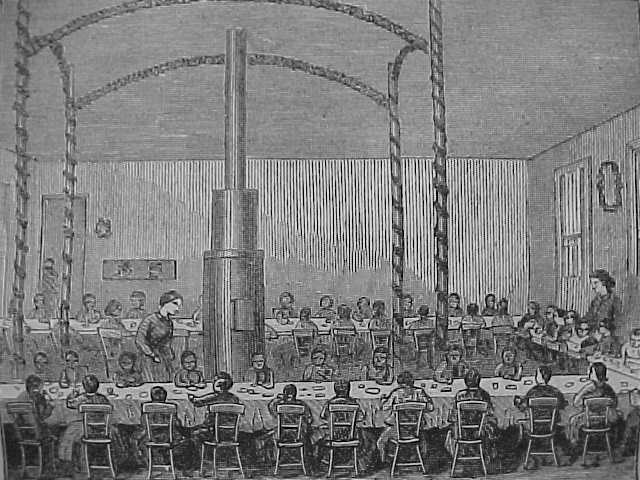
Dining room, Fitch Home

Until the 1870s, the center of Noroton, around where Noroton Avenue meets the Boston Post Road, was considered the commercial center of Darien and the area north of Interstate 95 that is now considered Noroton Heights was called "Noroton". The current center of town, where the railroad tracks cross the Boston Post Road, was called "Darien Depot". But when the town hall was established there, that area became "Darien" and "Noroton" was adopted by the old commercial center.

Following the war, the train connection allowed Darien to become a popular resort for prosperous New Yorkers who built summer homes in Tokeneke, Long Neck Point, and Noroton (this pattern was repeated elsewhere along the Connecticut shore and inland). A few daily commuters to New York City then were forerunners of the many to come who changed Darien into a residential suburb of metropolitan New York.

In 1896, Glenbreekin, a home sitting in a 200-acre (0.81 km^{2}) sheep farm, was built on the banks of the Goodwives River in Darien. By 2000 all the land except for 3.5 acres (14,000 m^{2}) had been sold off. The house itself was expanded in 1921 with a living room designed by the architect who created the Wrigley Building in Chicago and built by the contractor who constructed the pulpit of St. Patrick's Cathedral in New York City. The house was expanded again in 1994.

Theodore Dreiser is said to have written An American Tragedy in a Mediterranean-style estate in Tokeneke.

== Twentieth century ==
In 1902, Anson Phelps Stokes, a New York merchant, banker and philanthropist, bought the southern tip of Long Neck and built "Brick House" where he and his family lived for "many years," according to Henry Case and Simon Cooper. "During Stokes's ownership of Brick House, Andrew Carnegie occupied it several summers," they wrote.

In 1916, Carnegie's wife, Louise, wrote a friend:

We leave in 10 days for Brick House, Noroton, Connecticut, right on Long Island Sound where the yacht will be within hailing distance all the time and I expect we shall be on the water as much as on land this summer.

The property was later occupied by the Convent of the Sacred Heart which once ran an elite girls' school there. Sisters of President John F. Kennedy were educated there, including Eunice Kennedy Shriver and Kathleen Kennedy.

On September 5, 1929, the town's theater opened with a seating capacity of 700. It attracted moviegoers from surrounding towns as well, and community events were sometimes held there.

St. Thomas More Roman Catholic Church was established on September 16, 1966. Originally the home of St. John's Parochial School, the property which became the new parish originally included the school, a rectory and a convent. A fund-raising campaign to construct a church building began in 1971, and the building was dedicated on October 27, 1973.

In 1970, Post 53, a scout Explorer post and the town's ambulance service, began operation.

=== Development ===
Darien, Noroton and Noroton Heights were served by cars on the Stamford-Norwalk trolley line which ran along the Post Road (U. S. 1). Before a track connection was made with the Conn. Co. Stamford Division in 1914, passengers had to walk across the Noroton River bridge. Through cars operated until 1935.

==== Development of Tokeneke ====
The Tokeneke Corp. in 1901 was one of the first companies to start offering lots and summer homes. In 1904 it built the Tokeneke Inn (later converted into a private residence) for visitors to see the area, and started the Tokeneke Beach Club in 1909 so landowners without waterfront property could be assured they could enjoy the shoreline.

The company eventually went under and a property owner's association took control of the narrow, winding roads, which followed old trails and cattle paths. The town refused to take over the roads because they didn't meet town standards.

In 1914, Tokeneke Road was built from Railroad Avenue to Old Farm Road, along the path of trolley tracks that led to Rowayton. When it was paved in 1919, Tokeneke residents started using the Darien railroad station instead of the one in Rowayton.

==== Noroton Shores ====
In January 1926, Noroton Shores Inc. was formed and started developing the peninsula around Nearwater Lane and the surrounding water. In early March of that year, the company dredged about 500,000 cubic yards (380,000 m^{3}) from the Good Wives River on the eastern side of the peninsula. A crew of about 25 men from the Arundel Corp. of Baltimore worked 24 hours a day for about 11 months on the dredging, and a 160-foot (49 m) stone breaker was created, running eastward. Later, 300 feet (91 m) of waterfront was sold to the Noroton Yacht Club. In 1928, a second pier on the southwest of the peninsula was built, extending 300 feet (91 m).

The company also provided paved roads and an 8-inch (200 mm) water line running down Nearwater Lane, with 6-inch (150 mm) lines on the streets branching off it.

==== Three smaller developments along the coast ====
A tract of 40 acres (160,000 m^{2}) near Tokeneke, formerly part of the Delafield estate and the adjoining Waterbury and Bell property, named "Ceder Gate" was developed starting by 1912. In 1927, development of "Salem Straits" started on 56 acres (230,000 m^{2}) of rugged woodland on the west side of Scott's Cove. The purchase of property came with restrictions on the design of the buildings and minimum sizes for the lots. Between Salem Straits and Cedar Gate, the Delafield Estates Association was formed for property owners. The area was originally part of the Delafield family's estate, which resided there since 1859, when Edward Delafield, from New York City, bought the land. Tory Hole, a cave where Tories and criminal bands called "cowboys" would hide out, is in the Delafield area.

=== Exclusivity and racism ===
The Ku Klux Klan, which preached a doctrine of Protestant control of America and suppression of blacks, Jews and Catholics, had a following in Connecticut and Darien in the 1920s. A Darien resident, Harry Lutterman, was Grand Dragon in the state. The Connecticut Klan's popularity peaked in 1925 when it had a statewide membership of 15,000.

The nearby Stamford Republican Party used its Lincoln Republican Club as a front for all Klan activities in the area. During the 1924 election, one of the largest Klan meetings in the state took place in Stamford and was organized by Lutterman. The Stamford Advocate published an advertisement signed by local Democrats (who relied on the Catholic vote) protesting the meeting. The Klan published an advertisement in response, noting the "un-American" names of some of those who signed the Democrats' statement.

By 1926, the Klan leadership in the state was divided, and it lost strength, although it continued to maintain small, local branches for years afterward in Darien, as well as in Bridgeport, Stamford, Greenwich and Norwalk.

Darien was a sundown town – a town that used unwritten rules to prevent African Americans and Jewish people from remaining overnight.

== Twenty-first century ==
On September 11, 2001, six Darien residents died in the terrorist attacks. All of them were at the World Trade Center in New York City.

== Population ==
Historical population of Darien
1820	1,126
1830	1,212
1840	1,080
1850	1,454
1860	1,705
1870	1,808
1880	1,949
1890	2,276
1900	3,116
1910	3,946
1920	4,184
1930	6,951
1940	9,222
1950	11,767
1960	18,437
1970	20,336
1980	18,892
1990	18,196
2000	19,607
2010	20,752
2020	21,742

== On the National Register of Historic Places ==
- Boston Post Road Historic District – 567–728 Boston Post Rd., 1–25 Brookside Rd., and 45–70 Old Kingshighway N. (added 1982)
- DCA Meadowlands – 274 Middlesex Road; the Darien Community Association headquarters. (added November 6, 1987)
- Pond-Weed House — 2591 Post Road (corner of Post Road and Hollow Tree Ridge Road), a Saltbox style home and the oldest house in town. (added November 11, 1978)
- Stephen Tyng Mather House — 19 Stephen Mather Rd. (added November 15, 1966)

== For further reference ==
- Our Interesting Neighbors, by Beatrice Colgate, "Reprinted from the Darien Review/Darien, Connecticut/1954-1957,"
- Darien: 1641-1820-1970: Historical Sketches, published by the Darien Historical Society in association with The Peaquot Press Inc. (Essex, Connecticut), 1970
- "In Search of the Past: A self-Guided Tour of Darien" by Patricia Q. Wall, a 20-page booklet published by the Darien Historical Society in 1986
- Sundown Towns: A Hidden Dimension of American Racism, by James Loewen, New Press, 2005
- Town of Darien: Founded 1641, Incorporated 1820, by Henry Jay Case and Simon W. Cooper, published by the Darien Community Association, printed by Quinn & Biden Company Inc., Rahway, N.J., 1935
- Our Place Darien by Chris Gorman and Michelle Morfiit, a 40-page children's book about the history of Darien, published by Hometown 520, www.ourplacebooks.com
