= Pond-Weed House =

Historic house in Connecticut, United States

- U.S. National Register of Historic Places
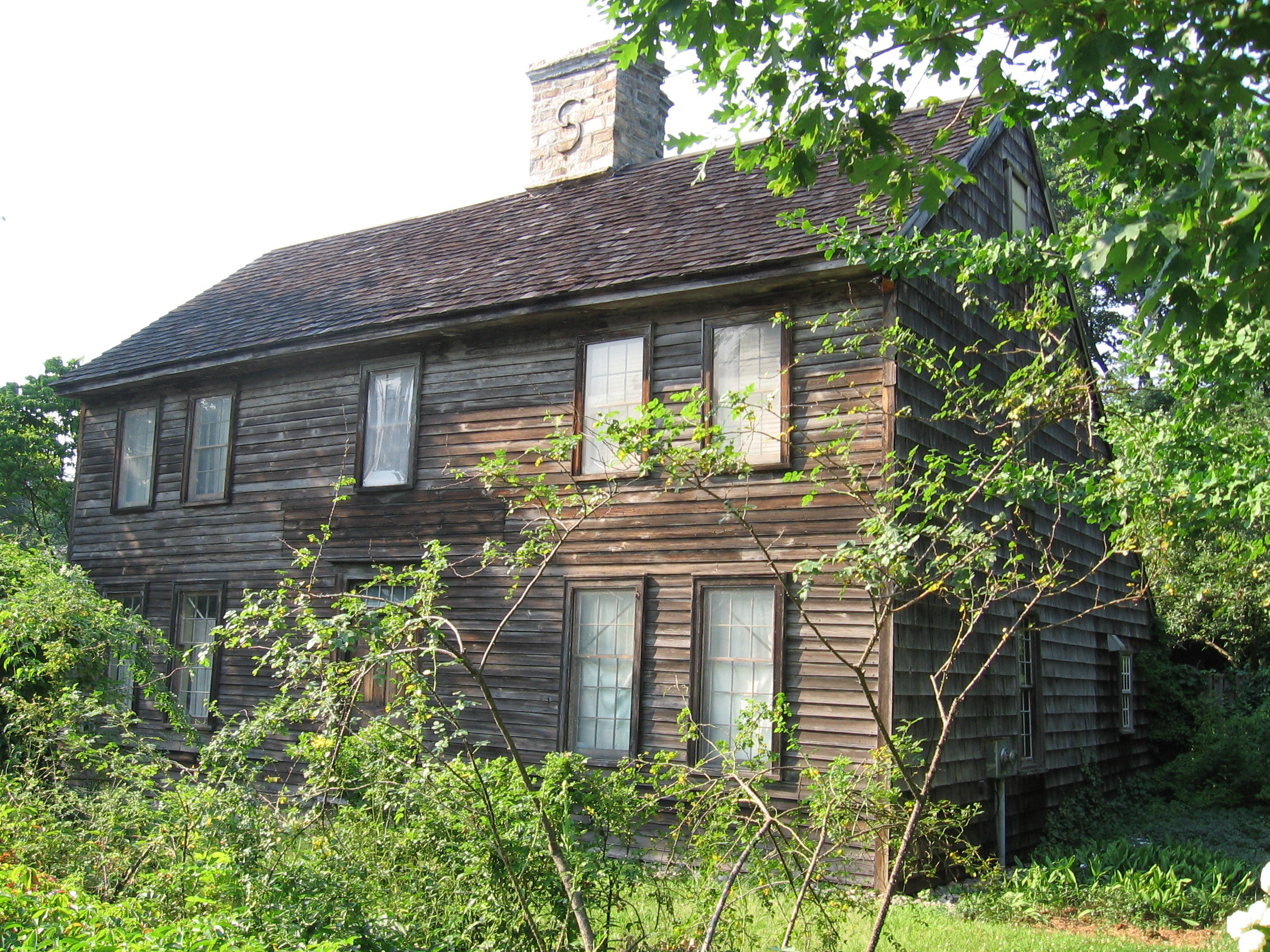

- Location within Connecticut Location within the United States
- Location: 2591 Post Road, Darien, Connecticut
- Coordinates: 41°3′35″N 73°30′11″W
- Area: 2200 sq ft
- Built: 1730
- NRHP reference No.: 78002842
- Added to NRHP: October 11, 1978

The Pond-Weed House is a historic house at corner of the old Boston Post Road and Hollow Tree Ridge Road in the Noroton section of Darien, Connecticut. It has also been known as The House Under the Hill and the Half-Way House. The house is believed to have been constructed between 1696 and 1728 based on early land records and documented alterations to the structure.

It is considered the oldest surviving building in Darien and was listed on the National Register of Historic Places in 1978. It was purchased and restored by artist Ellen Hackl Fagan in 2021.

== History ==
The land was purchased in 1696 by Nathaniel Pond, a blacksmith from Branford. According to the National Register of Historic Places, the house was constructed in the late 1690s and later modified around 1716.

The house was built near the Noroton River in one of the area's early settlement zones, when the area was part of Stamford. In 1716, Pond sold the property, including a dwelling house and barn to Nathaniel Weed, also a blacksmith. The house remained in the Weed family until 1926.

In the 18th century, the building served as a tavern known as the "Half-Way House" because of its position midway between Stamford and Norwalk on the Boston Post Road. It has also been called the "House Under the Hill".

The house was purchased by Ellen Hackl Fagan in 2021 who carried out further restoration work at the property.

== Architecture ==
The house is a 2½-story, wood-frame saltbox with a five-bay south facade and a central chimney. Early 19th-century Federal-style modifications to the house include enlarged window openings, double-hung sash windows, and a simple transom over the front door. The structure rests on a fieldstone foundation.

== See also ==
- List of the oldest buildings in Connecticut
- History of Darien, Connecticut
- National Register of Historic Places listings in Fairfield County, Connecticut
