= Gold Coast (Connecticut) =

Affluent part of southwestern Connecticut, US

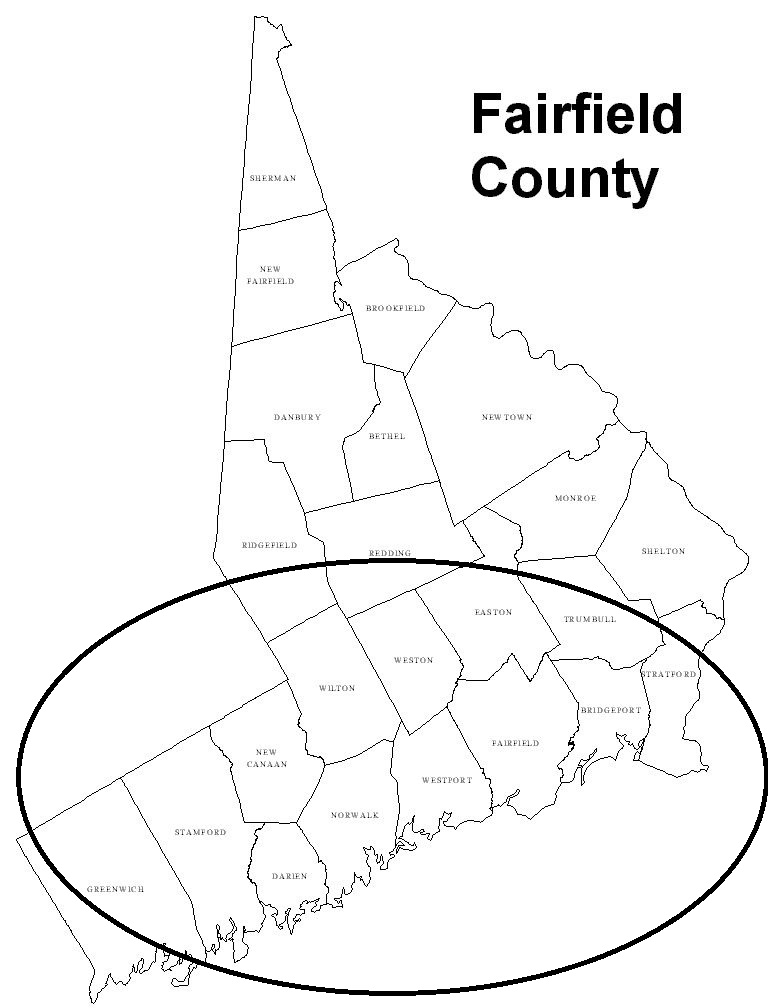
Gold Coast of Fairfield County

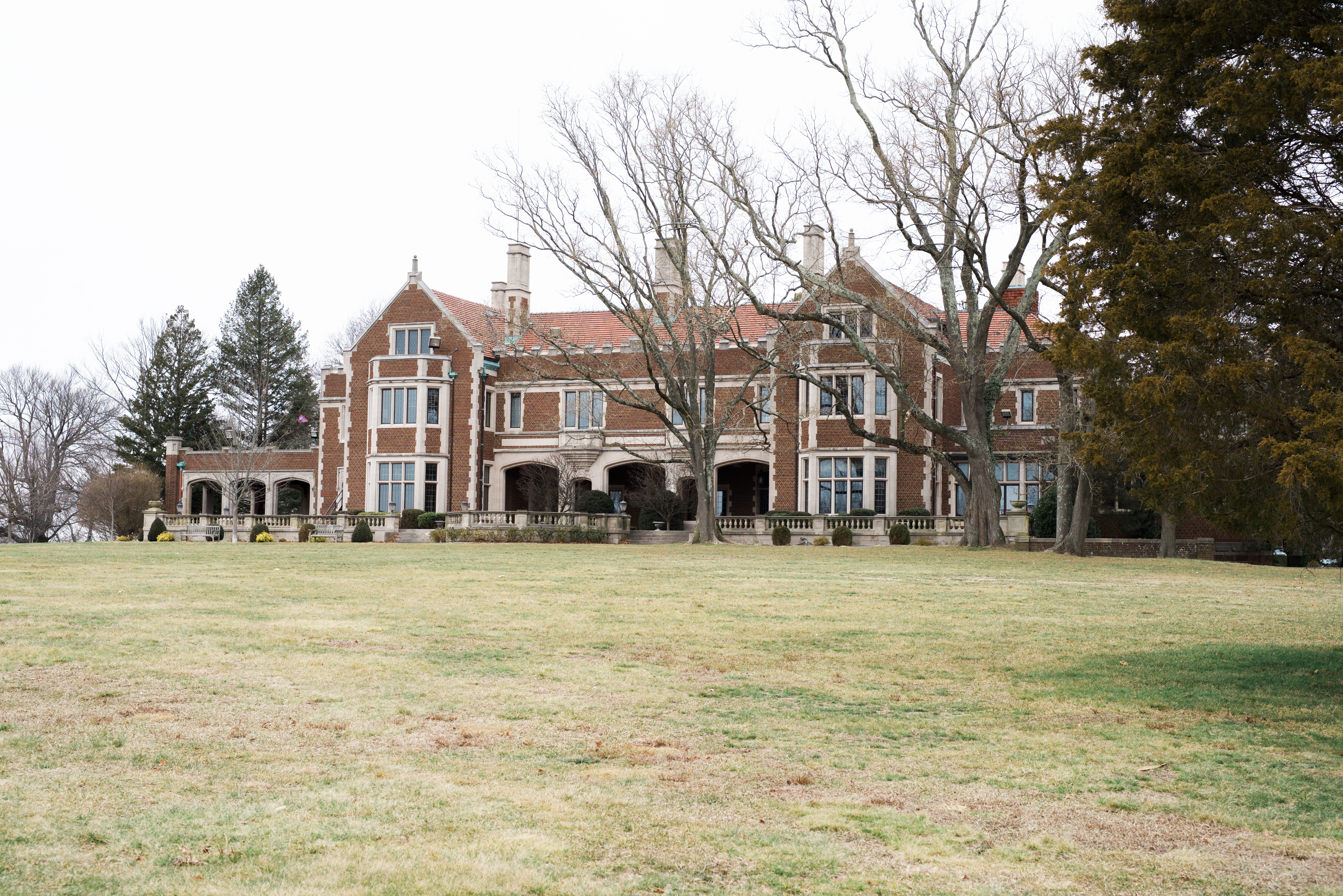
Waveny Park in New Canaan. Part of the Gold Coast of Connecticut, 2017

The Gold Coast, also known as Lower Fairfield County or Southwestern Connecticut, refers to an affluent part of Western Connecticut that includes the entire southern portion of Fairfield County as defined by the U.S. Census Bureau, Super-Public Use Microdata Area (Super-PUMA) Region 09600. The area is about 50 miles (80 km) northeast of New York City, and is home to many wealthy Manhattan business executives. Parts of the region are served by the Western Connecticut Council of Governments.

The Gold Coast of Connecticut is often portrayed in culture as a bastion of wealth. Since the mid-20th century, a number of novels and films have been set here, including Gentleman's Agreement, The Man in the Gray Flannel Suit, Revolutionary Road, Mr. Blandings Builds His Dream House, The Swimmer, The Stepford Wives, and The Ice Storm. The Showtime drama series Billions highlights the area's prominence as a haven for hedge funds and other financial services firms.

== Municipalities and neighborhoods ==
- Aspetuck
- Back Country
- Belle Haven
- Bell Island
- Black Rock
- Bridgeport
- Byram
- Compo
- Cos Cob
- The Cove
- Darien
- East Norwalk
- Easton
- Fairfield
- Fairfield Beach
- Greenfield Hill
- Greens Farms
- Greenwich
- Lordship
- Lyons Plains
- Mianus
- New Canaan
- Nichols
- Noroton
- Noroton Heights
- North Stamford
- Norwalk
- Old Greenwich
- Redding
- Ridgefield
- Riverside
- Round Hill
- Rowayton
- Sasco Hill
- Saugatuck
- Shippan Point
- Silvermine
- South Norwalk
- Southport
- St. Mary's-by-the-Sea
- Stamford
- Stratford
- Tokeneke
- Trumbull
- Weston
- Westover
- Westport
- Wilson Point
- Wilton

The "Gold Coast" is most notable for the expensive waterfront properties located along its shore, as well as the proximity of its cities and towns to New York City. Historically, Greenwich has been the crown jewel of the state, owing primarily to its access to water and proximity to Manhattan. As of 2018, Riverside, a Greenwich neighborhood located immediately to the east of the town's center, has surpassed Greenwich proper to become the wealthiest town in the state, with an average income of $740,130, compared to Greenwich's $721,550. Much of this can be attributed to changing buyer tastes, favoring walkable neighborhoods with amenities and easy train access, all of which Riverside is known for. Much of Greenwich stretches far north of the coast and the New Haven commuter railroad line, and consists of old/retired wealthy individuals and families who do not frequently commute to Manhattan.

After Riverside and Greenwich, the next four richest towns are Darien ($599,920), New Canaan ($532,440), Old Greenwich ($530,250), and Rowayton ($422,210). All of these towns are located not too far east of Greenwich and Riverside, and (besides New Canaan) are located on the coast.

Greenwich has the lowest mill rate, which may indicate higher property value, with Darien ranking second.

In 2000, New Canaan had a higher percentage of resident homeowners (83%) than Greenwich (69%), which may indicate more wealth. According to some sources, New Canaan should be considered the wealthiest town along the Gold Coast because of its higher rate of home ownership, suggesting a higher level of personal assets. In July 2011, The Daily Fairfield reported that Darien was the state's richest town.

An additional consideration is to measure wealth per person - not aggregate town wealth. Both the Adjusted Equalized Net Grand List per Capita (AENGLC) Wealth Value and the CPR AENGLC Wealth Value show that Greenwich has the highest wealth value in Connecticut, at more than $430,000 per person. The AENGLC is based on the value of residential and commercial real estate, and measures the town's tax base available to pay for public education (see Conn. Dep of Ed). It is not a measure of the personal wealth of individual residents.
