= Rowayton station =

Metro-North Railroad station in Connecticut

Rowayton
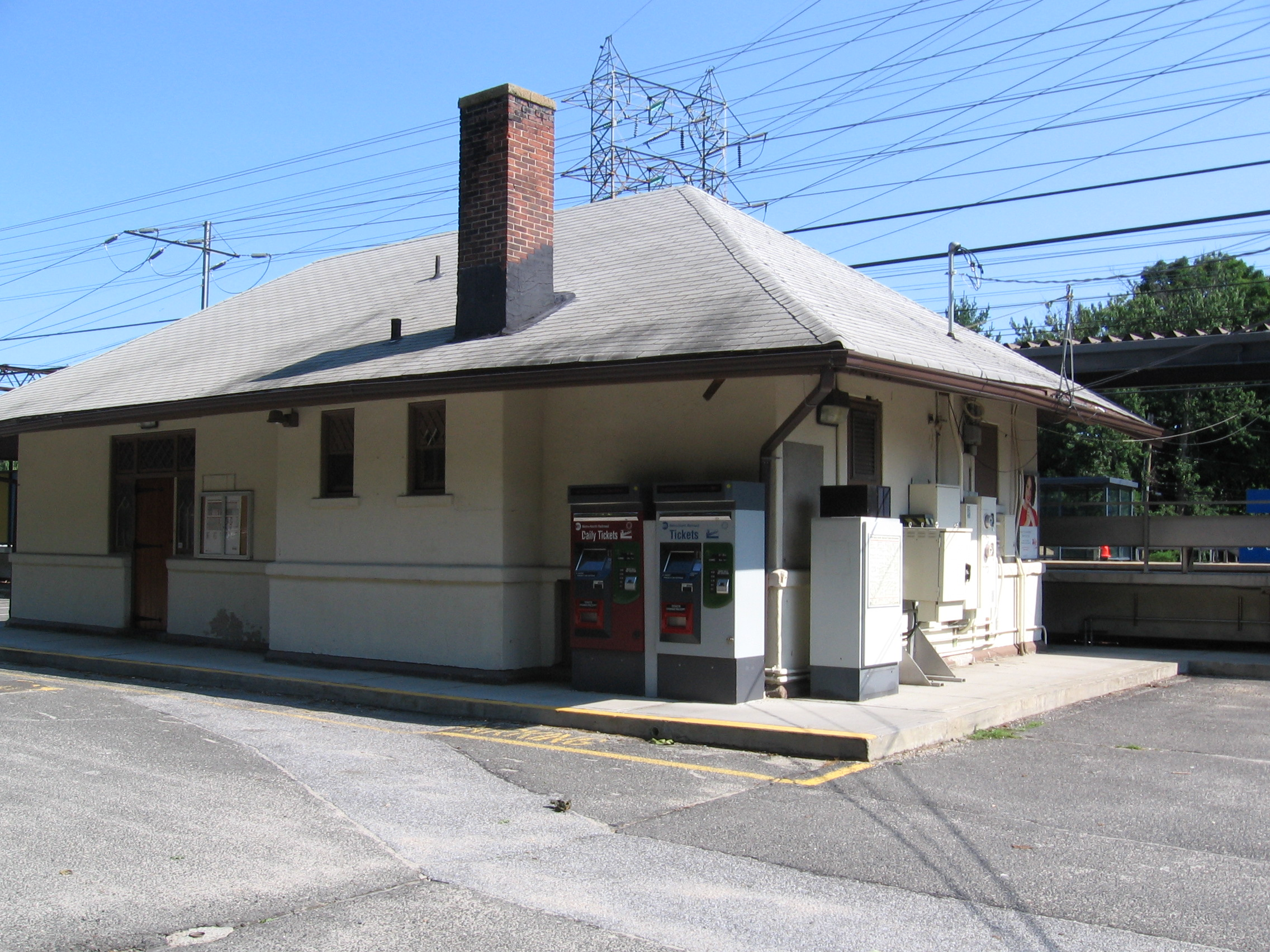
- Rowayton station in 2007

General information
- Location: 299 Rowayton Avenue at 1 Belmont Place; Norwalk, Connecticut
- Coordinates: 41.07851°N 73.445535°W
- Owner: ConnDOT
- Line: ConnDOT New Haven Line (Northeast Corridor)
- Platforms: 2 side platforms
- Tracks: 4
- Connections: Norwalk Transit District: 12

Construction
- Parking: 330 spaces

Other information
- Fare zone: 16

Passengers
- 2018: 547 daily boardings

Services
Preceding station	Metro-North Railroad	Following station
Darien toward Grand Central	New Haven Line	South Norwalk toward New Haven or New Haven State Street
Darien toward Grand Central	Danbury Branch weekday service	South Norwalk toward Danbury
Former services
Preceding station	New York, New Haven and Hartford Railroad	Following station
Darien toward New York	Main Line	Norwalk and South Norwalk toward New Haven
Location

Rowayton station is a commuter rail station on the Metro-North Railroad New Haven Line, located in the Rowayton neighborhood of Norwalk, Connecticut.

Nineteenth-century artist and humanitarian Vincent Colyer helped to get the original station built.

== Station layout ==
The station has two high-level side platforms, each six cars long, serving the outer tracks of the four-track Northeast Corridor.
