= Darien, Connecticut =

Town in Connecticut, United States

- Town
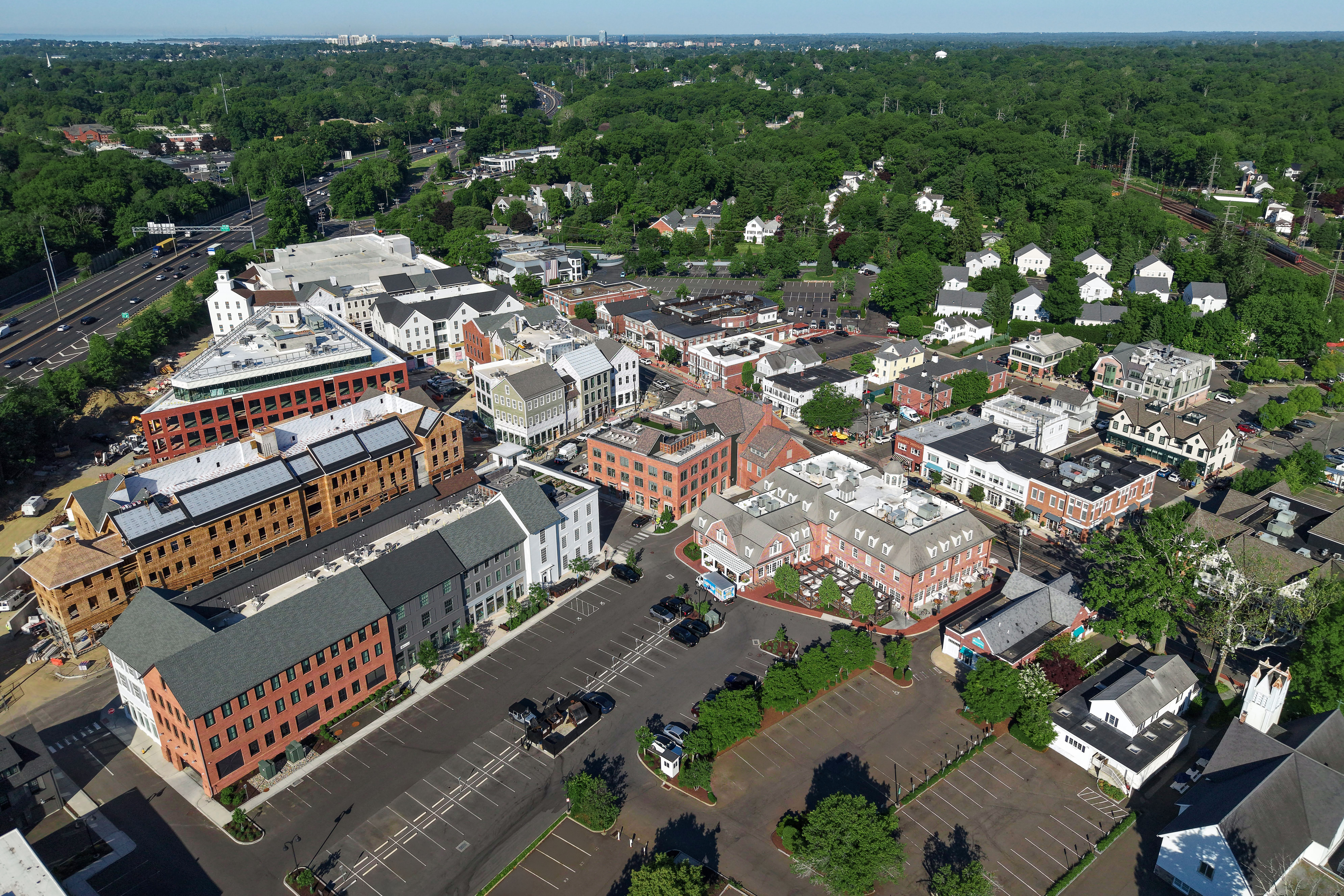
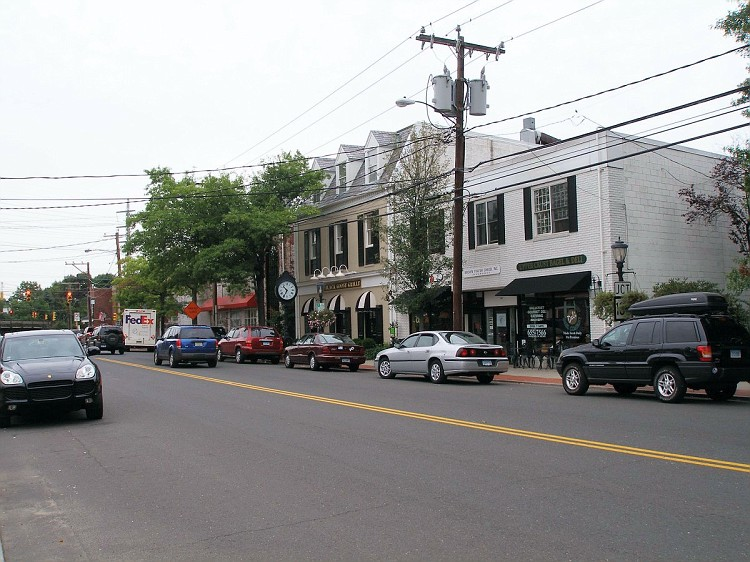
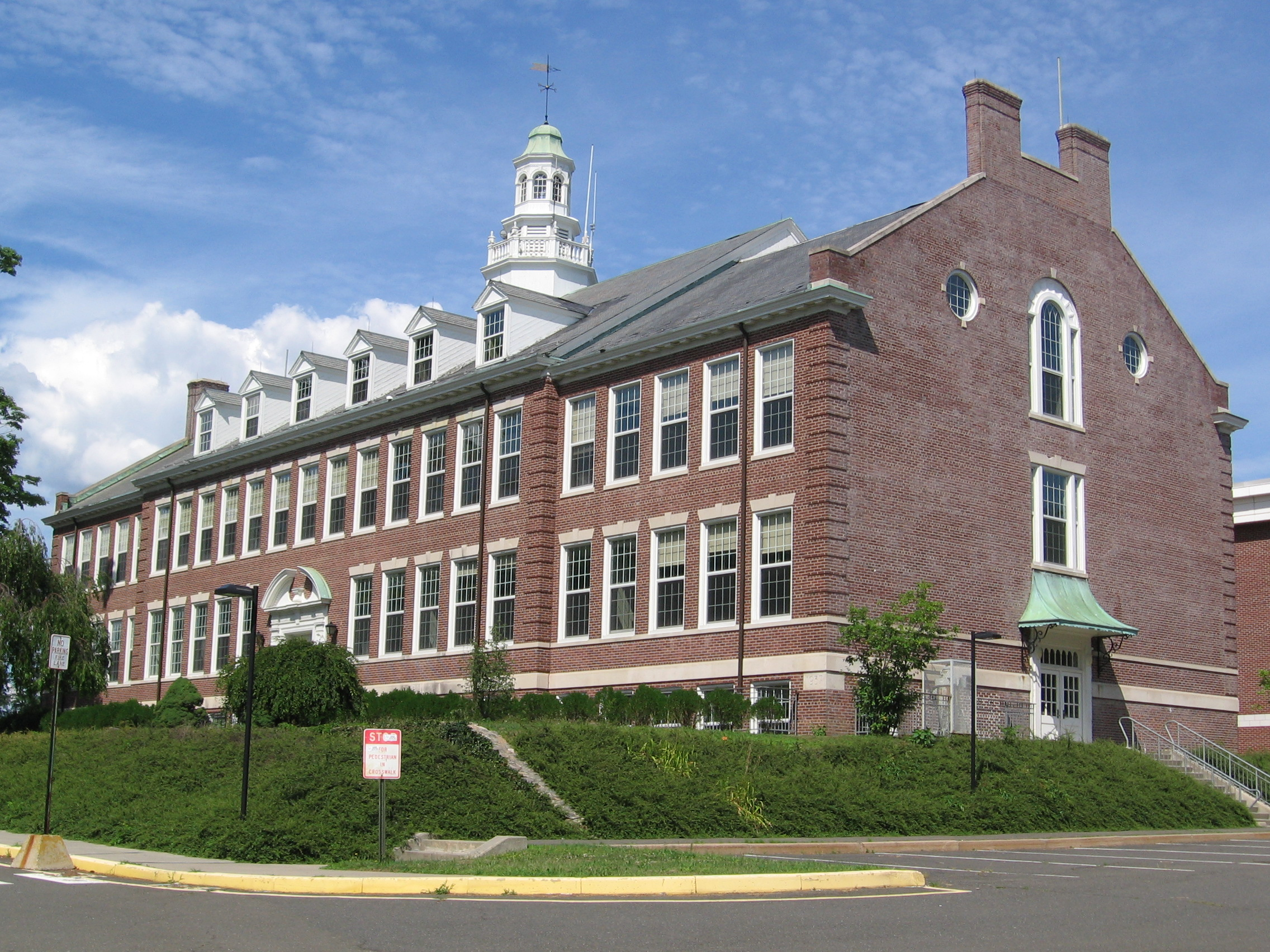
- Downtown Boston Post Road in Darien's retail district Middlesex Middle School Woodway Country Club Noroton Yacht Club

- Flag Seal

- Coordinates: 41°03′04″N 73°28′45″W
- Country: United States
- U.S. state: Connecticut
- County: Fairfield
- Region: Western CT
- Incorporated: 1820

Government
  - Type: Representative town meeting
  - First selectman: Jon Zagrodzky (R)
  - Selectmen: Michael Burke (D); Marcy Minnick (R); Monica McNally (R); Sarah Neumann (D)

Area
  - Total: 23.4 sq mi (60.6 km^{2})
  - Land: 12.9 sq mi (33.4 km^{2})
  - Water: 10.6 sq mi (27.4 km^{2})
- Elevation: 52 ft (16 m)

Population (2020)
  - Total: 21,499
  - Density: 1,666.6/sq mi (643.5/km^{2})
- Time zone: UTC−5 (Eastern)
  - Summer (DST): UTC−4 (Eastern)
- ZIP Code: 06820
- Area codes: 203/475
- FIPS code: 09-18850
- GNIS feature ID: 0213416
- Website: www.darienct.gov

Darien (/ˌdɛəriˈæn/ DAIR-ee-AN) is a coastal town in Fairfield County, Connecticut, United States. It is the smallest town on Connecticut's Gold Coast.

Situated on the Long Island Sound between the cities of Stamford and Norwalk, Darien is a commuter town for New York City. There are two railroad stations in Darien, Noroton Heights and Darien, linking the town to Grand Central Terminal.

== History ==
According to early records, the first clearings of land were made by men from the New Haven and Wethersfield colonies and from Norwalk in about 1641. It was not until 1739, however, that the Middlesex Society of the Town of Stamford built the first community church, now the First Congregational Church of Darien, which stands on the original site at the corner of Brookside Road and the Boston Post Road.

Tories raided the town several times during the American Revolution; at one point, they took 26 men in the parish prisoner for five months, including the Reverend Moses Mather, pastor of the parish. The Loyalist-Patriot conflict in Darien is the setting for the novel Tory Hole, the first book by children's author Louise Hall Tharp. Middlesex Parish was incorporated as the Town of Darien in 1820.

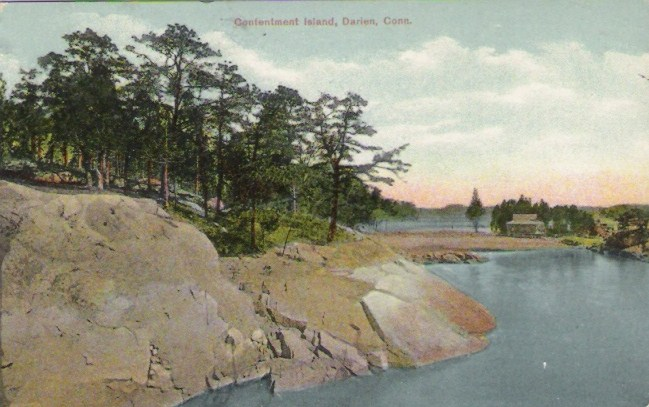
Contentment Island, c. 1914

According to the Darien Historical Society, the name Darien was decided upon when the residents of the town could not agree on a name to replace Middlesex Parish, many families wanting it to be named after themselves. Some proposed naming the town "Belleville" in honor of Thaddeus Bell, a veteran of the revolutionary war. He apparently rejected the honor while supporting the Darien option. A sailor who had traveled to Isthmus of Darien, then part of the Spanish Empire, suggested the name Darien, which was eventually adopted by the people of the town. The town name is pronounced /dɛəriˈæn/ (like "Dairy-Ann"), with stress on the last syllable, and has been referred to as such at least as far back as 1913.

Darien was mostly white Protestant through the middle of the twentieth century, but by the twenty-first century it had become a multi-ethnic town with residents of many religions and backgrounds. One in seven households reports speaking a language other than English at home. The town's exclusive policies in the early 20th century were similar to other segregated suburbs of the time, including Beverly Hills, California, and Tuxedo Park, New York. There were events involving anti-Black racism and anti-Semitism in the 1930s and 1940s, with Darien being a prototypical sundown town.

== Geography ==
According to the United States Census Bureau, the town has a total area of 14.8 square miles (38 km^{2}), of which 12.9 square miles (33 km^{2}) is land and 2.0 square miles (5.2 km^{2}), or 13.41%, is water.

Darien is bordered on the west by Stamford, on the north by New Canaan, and on the east by Norwalk. On the south it faces Long Island Sound and the North Shore of Long Island. It is part of the Connecticut panhandle jutting into New York state. Highways include Interstate 95. It also has two Metro-North Railroad stations for commuter trains into New York City, Noroton Heights and Darien.

=== Sections of Darien ===
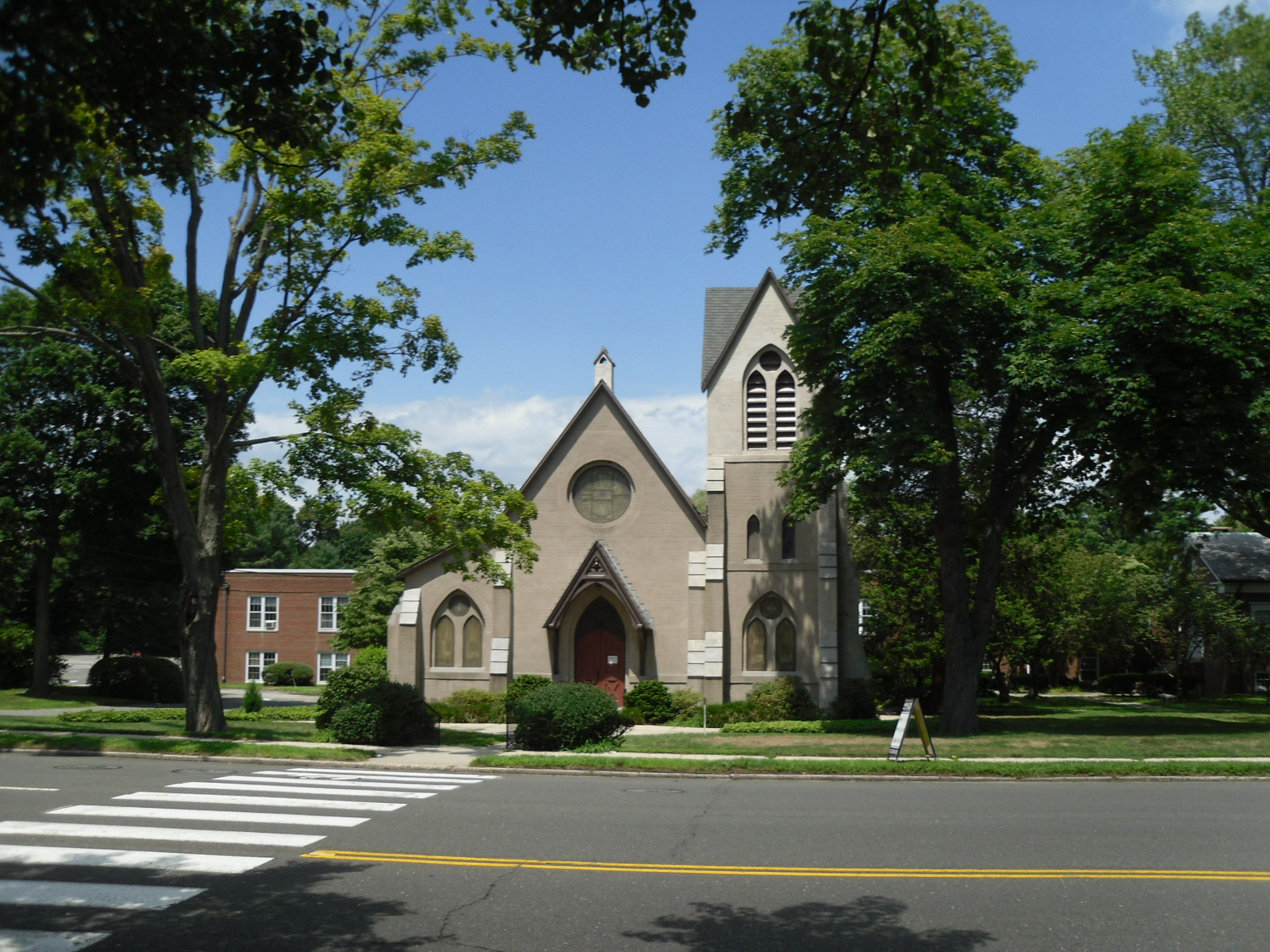
Noroton Presbyterian Church in Darien

- Darien Downtown
- Long Neck Point
- Noroton
- Noroton Heights, a neighborhood that historically "housed the European immigrants who serviced the old estates". Noroton Heights' densely populated streets contain "modest Capes and colonials" along with other house styles.
- Ox Ridge
- Tokeneke

=== Climate ===
Darien has a humid continental climate, similar to that of New York City, with warm to hot summers and cold winters. The highest recorded temperature was 103 °F (39 °C) in July 1966, while the lowest recorded temperature was −15 °F (−26 °C) in 1968. Snowfall is generally frequent in winter while average precipitation is most common in September.

== Demographics ==
Historical population
Census	Pop.	Note	%±
1820	1,126		—
1850	1,454		—
1860	1,705		17.3%
1870	1,808		6.0%
1880	1,949		7.8%
1890	2,276		16.8%
1900	3,116		36.9%
1910	3,946		26.6%
1920	4,184		6.0%
1930	6,951		66.1%
1940	9,222		32.7%
1950	11,767		27.6%
1960	18,437		56.7%
1970	20,336		10.3%
1980	18,892		−7.1%
1990	18,196		−3.7%
2000	19,607		7.8%
2010	20,752		5.8%
2020	21,499		3.6%
U.S. Decennial Census

As of the census of 2000, there were 19,607 people, 6,592 households, and 5,385 families residing in the town. The population density was 1,525.2 inhabitants per square mile (588.9/km^{2}). There were 6,792 housing units at an average density of 203.9 inhabitants/km^{2} (528.3 persons/sq mi). The racial makeup of the town was 95.97% White, 0.45% African American, 0.04% Native American, 2.42% Asian, 0.03% Pacific Islander, 0.30% from other races, and 0.80% from two or more races. Hispanic or Latino of any race were 2.19% of the population. In 2019, the median household income was $232,523 and the per capita income for the town was $116,564.

== Arts and recreation ==
=== Annual events ===
- May – Memorial Day Parade.
- June – Weed Beach Fest.
- October – Downtown Halloween Parade.

=== Darien Library ===
The Darien Library was founded in 1894. Andrew Carnegie had offered funds for a library, and was rejected. In 2012 the Darien Library was the most heavily utilized library in Connecticut.

=== Landmarks ===
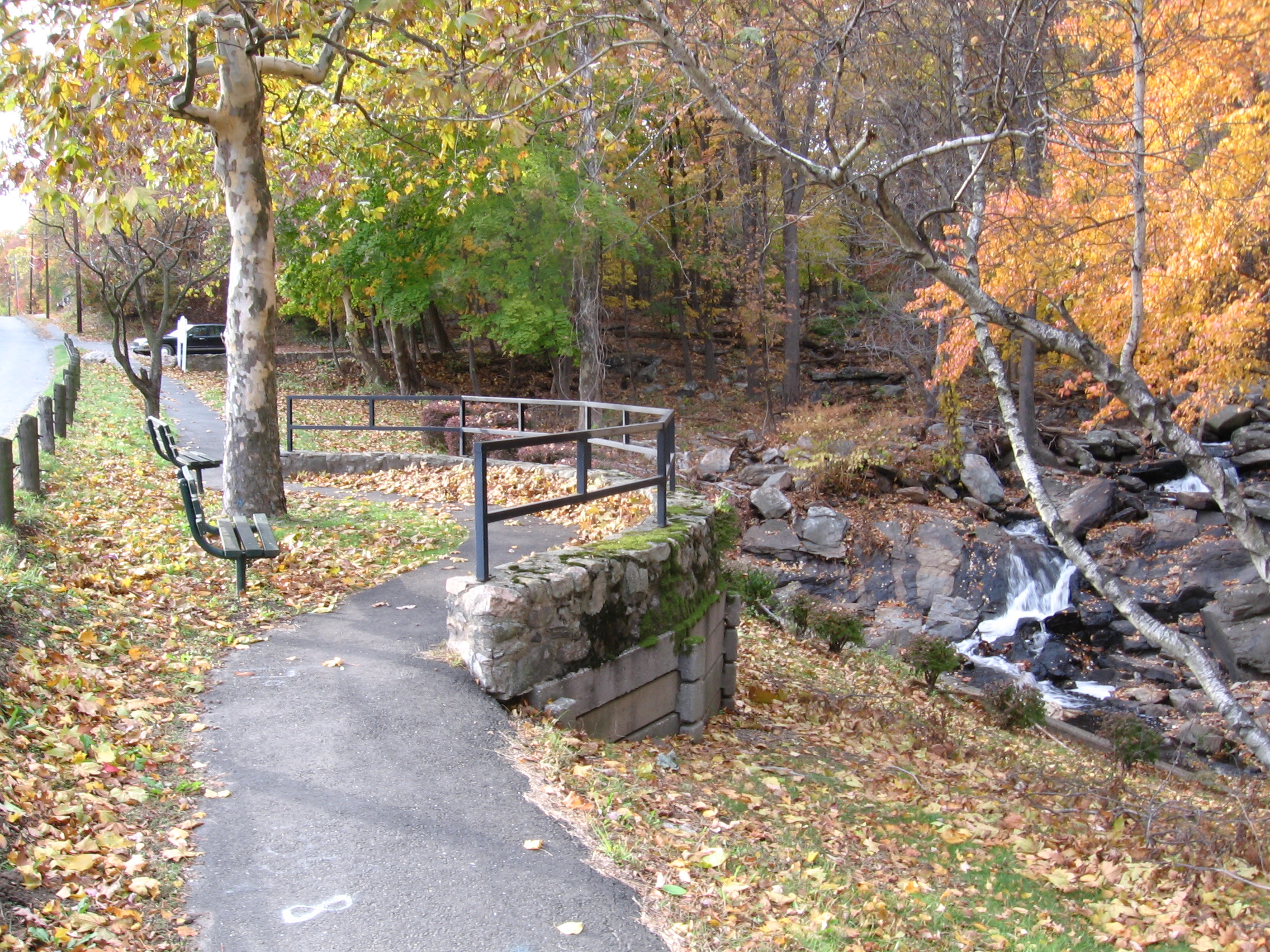
Autumn in Stony Brook Park

- The Frederick J. Smith House, designed by architect Richard Meier, was completed in 1967.
- Stephen Tyng Mather Home is a National Historic Landmark, and is listed on the National Register of Historic Places.

== Parks and recreation ==
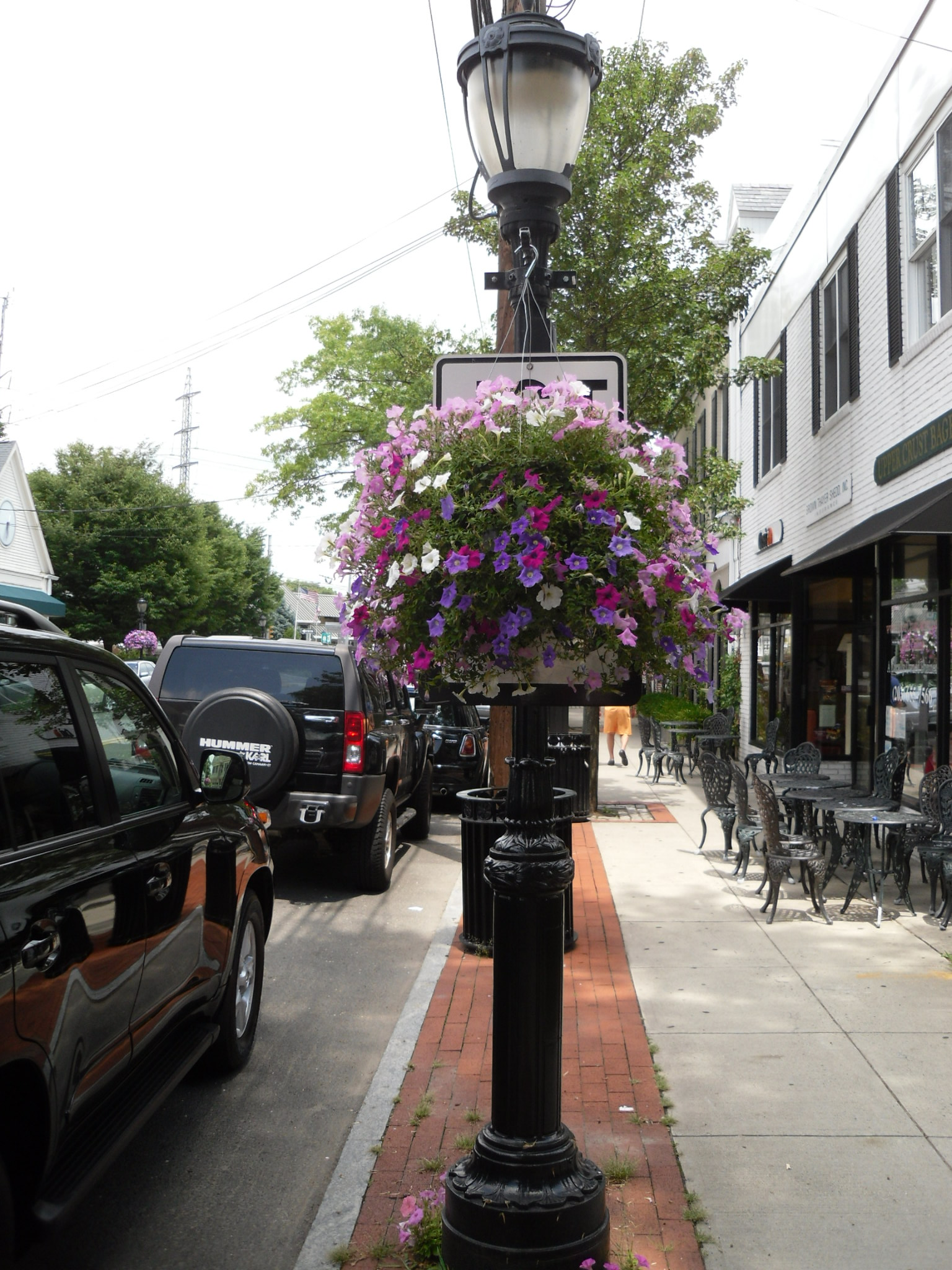
Floral decorations

The Darien Ice House is an ice rink.

Founded in 1928, Noroton Yacht Club runs the largest junior sailing program in the United States.

In 2023, the town of Darien finalized the purchase of Great Island, a 60-acre property on Long Island Sound, for $85 million.

== Government ==
Elected bodies in the town government are a five-member Board of Selectmen, a nine-member Board of Education, a seven-member Board of Finance, a six-member Planning and Zoning Commission, three-member Board of Assessment Appeals, and a 100-member, nonpartisan Representative Town Meeting. The town has several elective offices as well: the town clerk, probate judge, registrar of voters, tax collector and treasurer. The Board of Finance approves financial measures, including the town budget; the Board of Education controls the town's public schools; the Representative Town Meeting is the main legislative body of the town.

=== United States Congress ===
Senators	Name	Party	Assumed office	Level
Senate Class 3	Richard Blumenthal	Democratic	2011	Senior Senator
Senate Class 1	Chris Murphy	Democratic	2013	Junior Senator
Representatives	Name	Party	Assumed office	
District 4	Jim Himes	Democratic	2009	

=== Connecticut General Assembly ===
==== Connecticut State Senate ====
District	Name	Party	Assumed office
25th	Bob Duff	Democratic	2001
26th	Ceci Maher	Democratic	2023
27th	Patricia Billie Miller	Democratic	2021

==== Connecticut House of Representatives ====
District	Name	Party	Assumed office
125th	Tom O'Dea	Republican	2013
141st	Tracy Marra	Republican	2023

== Education ==
Darien High School was ranked No. 1 in the "U.S. News Best High Schools in Connecticut" in 2019. The school also ranked in the top 150 in the national rankings, and in the top 50 in STEM high schools in the United States. Darien has five elementary schools: Hindley School, Holmes School, Ox Ridge School, Royle School, and Tokeneke School. A $27 million addition was completed in 2000 to the town's middle school, Middlesex Middle School, and a new $73 million campus for Darien High School was completed in the fall of 2005. Darien sports teams go by the name of the "Blue Wave".

Pear Tree Point School, originally named Plumfield School, was a private school on Long Neck, educating students in pre-kindergarten through Grade 5. The school was closed in summer 2018.

== Media ==
Darien is served by a local print and online weekly newspaper, the Darien Times, and four exclusively online local news websites: Darienite, HamletHub Darien, the Darien Patch, and The Daily Voice, Darien. A monthly magazine known as New Canaan and Darien Magazine is also published covering Darien, New Canaan, and Rowayton (a section of the city of Norwalk). Sound Watch Magazine. is another monthly publication, founded in 2019, dedicated to local news and history of the area. Most public meetings are filmed and broadcast live, and recorded for later broadcast by Cablevision's Channel 79 Government Access.

=== Film ===
Films at least partially filmed in Darien with release date include:

- Gypsy (2017)
- Hope Springs (2012)
- Hello I Must Be Going (2012)
- My Soul to Take (2010)
- Birds of America (2008)
- Revolutionary Road (2008)
- The Big Wedding (2013)
- The Life Before Her Eyes (2007)
- The Stepford Wives (2004)
- Cannonball Run II (1984)
- The Stepford Wives (1975)
- Gentleman's Agreement (1947) – based on a book by Laura Hobson that portrayed Darien as a restricted community that excludes Jews.
- The Perfect Date (2019) – a young man obsessed with getting into Yale pretends to be from Darien to impress a wealthy Greenwich woman.

== Infrastructure ==
=== Emergency ===
Darien is "the only town in lower Fairfield County that has an all-volunteer fire and EMS service," according to First Selectman Jon Zagrodzky.

==== Emergency Medical Services ====
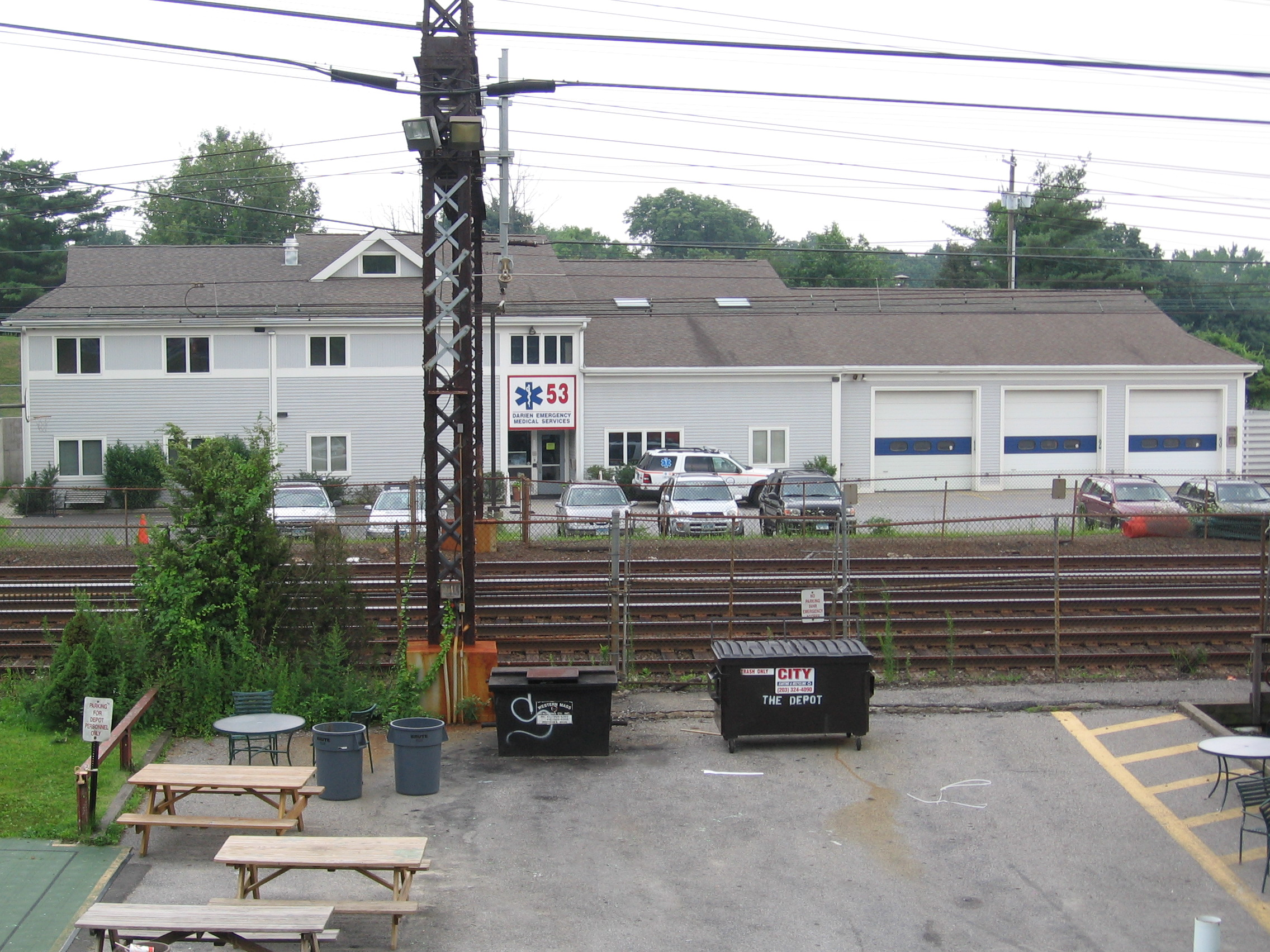
Post 53 headquarters

Darien's emergency medical service, known as "Darien EMS – Post 53," is the only ambulance service in the nation run by high school student volunteers and responds to over 1,500 emergency calls annually. The service provides emergency care at no cost to the patient, funded entirely by private donations from town residents. Teenagers are allowed to perform patient care because Connecticut is one of the few states in the nation which allows emergency medical technicians to be certified at age 16. Paramedics are contracted from Stamford EMS for advanced life support, and the "young adults" respond alongside adult supervisors.

==== Fire ====
Darien is protected by three all-volunteer fire departments: Darien Fire Department, Noroton Fire Department, and Noroton Heights Fire Department. Volunteer firefighters from all three departments, along with Post 53 personnel, are credited with evacuating 50 people from an I-95 bus fire during a January 2026 snow storm.

==== Police ====
The Darien Police Department, with its 53 sworn officers, is the town's law enforcement agency. The Tokeneke Tax District is patrolled by the Tokeneke Patrol, contracted constables with arrest powers who work alongside Darien Police.

=== Transportation ===
The town is served by two train stations, Noroton Heights and Darien station. The Connecticut Turnpike (Interstate 95) and Post Road (Connecticut Route 1) pass through Darien. Interstate 95 has rest stops in Darien for the southbound and northbound lanes.
