= Louise Hall Tharp =

American biographer

Louise Hall Tharp (1898–1992) was an American biographer.

== Childhood and family ==
She was born in Oneonta, New York, but when she was very young the family moved to Springfield, Massachusetts, where her father was vicar of the North Congregational Church. She trained as an artist for two years at the School of the Museum of Fine Arts, Boston, then went with her father on a tour of Europe. She married Carey Hunter Tharp of Huntsville, Texas. The couple had two sons, Carey Edwin, Jr., and Marshall. they lived in Darien, Connecticut.

== Writing ==
Tharp published four books of historical fiction before she wrote her first biography, Champlain: Northwest Voyager.

== Books ==
=== Biographies ===
- A Sounding Trumpet: Julia Ward Howe and the Battle Hymn of the Republic
- Champlain: Northwest Voyager, Little Brown, 1944.
- Company of adventurers: The Story of the Hudson's Bay Company, Little, Brown and Co., 1946.
- The Peabody Sisters of Salem (Little, Brown and Company: Boston, 1950). 1968 pbk reprint. ASIN B003UY3FFA.
- Until Victory: Horace Mann and Mary Peabody (Boston: Little, Brown, 1953).
- Three Saints and a Sinner: Julia Ward Howe, Louisa, Annie and Sam, Little Brown and Co. 1956
- Adventurous alliance; the story of the Agassiz family of Boston, Little, Brown, 1959.
- Louis Agassiz, adventurous scientist, Little, Brown, 1961.
- The Baroness and the General, Little, Brown and Company, Boston/Toronto, 1962.
- Jack.html?id=WAnqAAAAMAAJ Mrs. Jack; a biography of Isabella Stewart Gardner, Boston, Little, Brown, 1965. Tharp, Louise Hall (1965). 1984 pbk reprint. P. Weed Books. ISBN 0926637002.
- Saint-Gaudens and the gilded era, Little, Brown, 1969.
- The Appletons of Beacon Hill, Little, Brown and Company, 1973.

=== Books for children ===
- Down to the sea; a young people's life of Nathaniel Bowditch, the great American navigator, R.M. McBride and Company, 1942.
- Tory Hole; a young people's account of the Tory attack on Middlesex Parish, CT during the Revolutionary War, Darien Community Assoc., Inc. 1940/1976.
- Sixpence for Luck; a young people's look at colonial life in New London, Ct, Thomas Y. Crowell Co., 1941
- Champlain: Northwest Voyager; the adventure story of a pioneer of The New World. Peakirk Books, 1946
