= Noroton Yacht Club =

- Burgee
- Short name: NNYC
- Founded: 1928
- Location: Noroton, Connecticut, U.S.
- Website: www.norotonyc.org

Noroton Yacht Club (NYC) is a private yacht club in Noroton, Connecticut, on Noroton Harbor. Located in the Noroton Bay neighborhood, the club was founded in 1928 and today hosts the best junior sailing programs in the world. Youths from 8–17 years old participate in an eight-week period during the summer. NYC has a large fleet of Sonars, and coordinates club races each week.

Former members of the world-renowned club "have included two America's Cup skippers, numerous cardiac surgeons, three investment bank presidents and one astronaut. Noroton was the home yacht club of famous sailboat designer Bruce Kirby (Laser, Ideal 18, Sonar, Pixel). Current members include 2012 US Olympic Laser sailor Rob Crane, and NYC's Rick Doerr, who competed on the U.S. Paralympic Team in a Sonar at the 2016 Olympics in Rio. Noroton Yacht Club hosted the 2018 Sonar North American Championships.

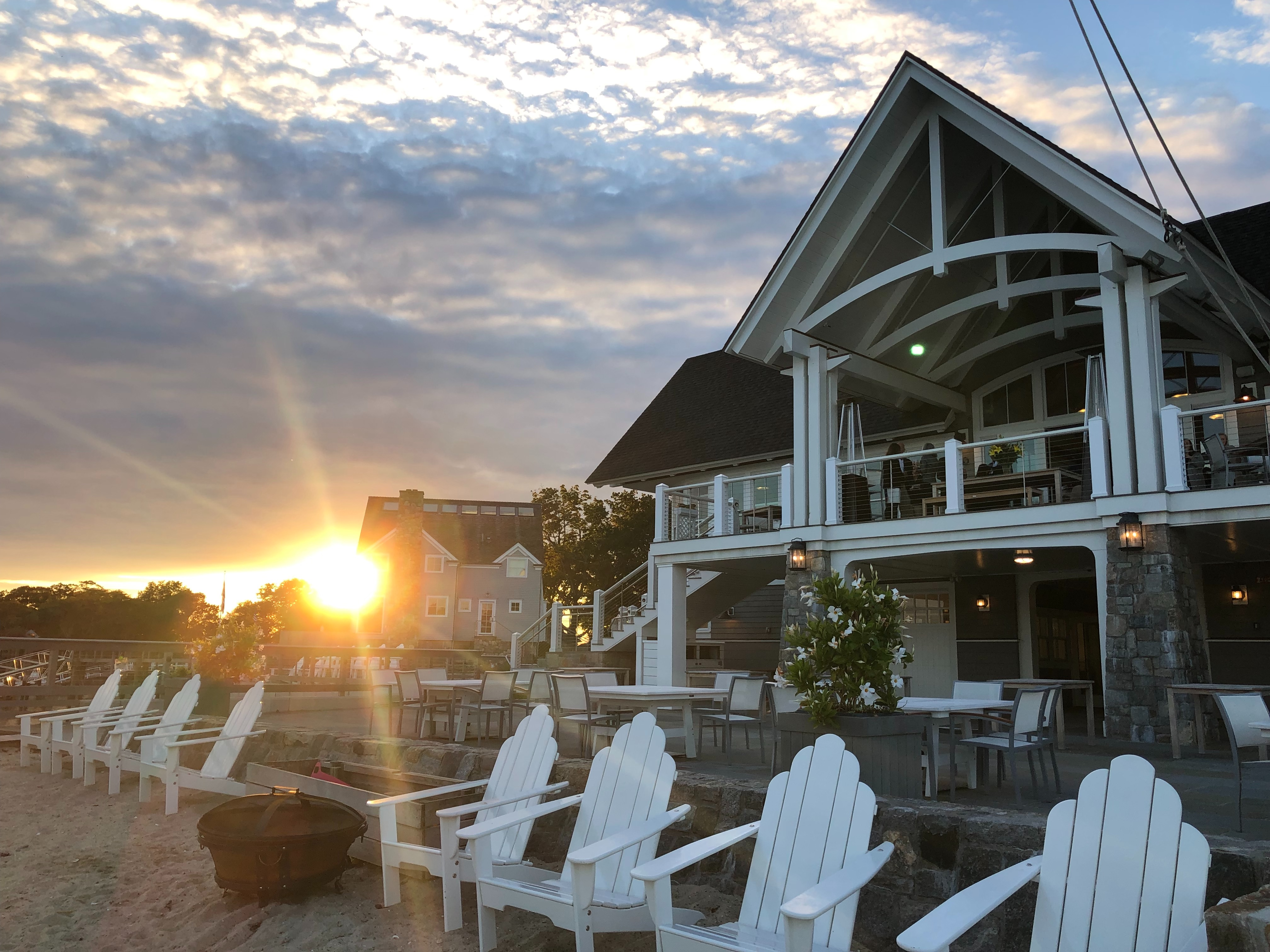
The historic Tudor-style clubhouse was demolished and replaced in 2017.
