= Darien station =

Railroad station in Darien, Connecticut, US

Darien
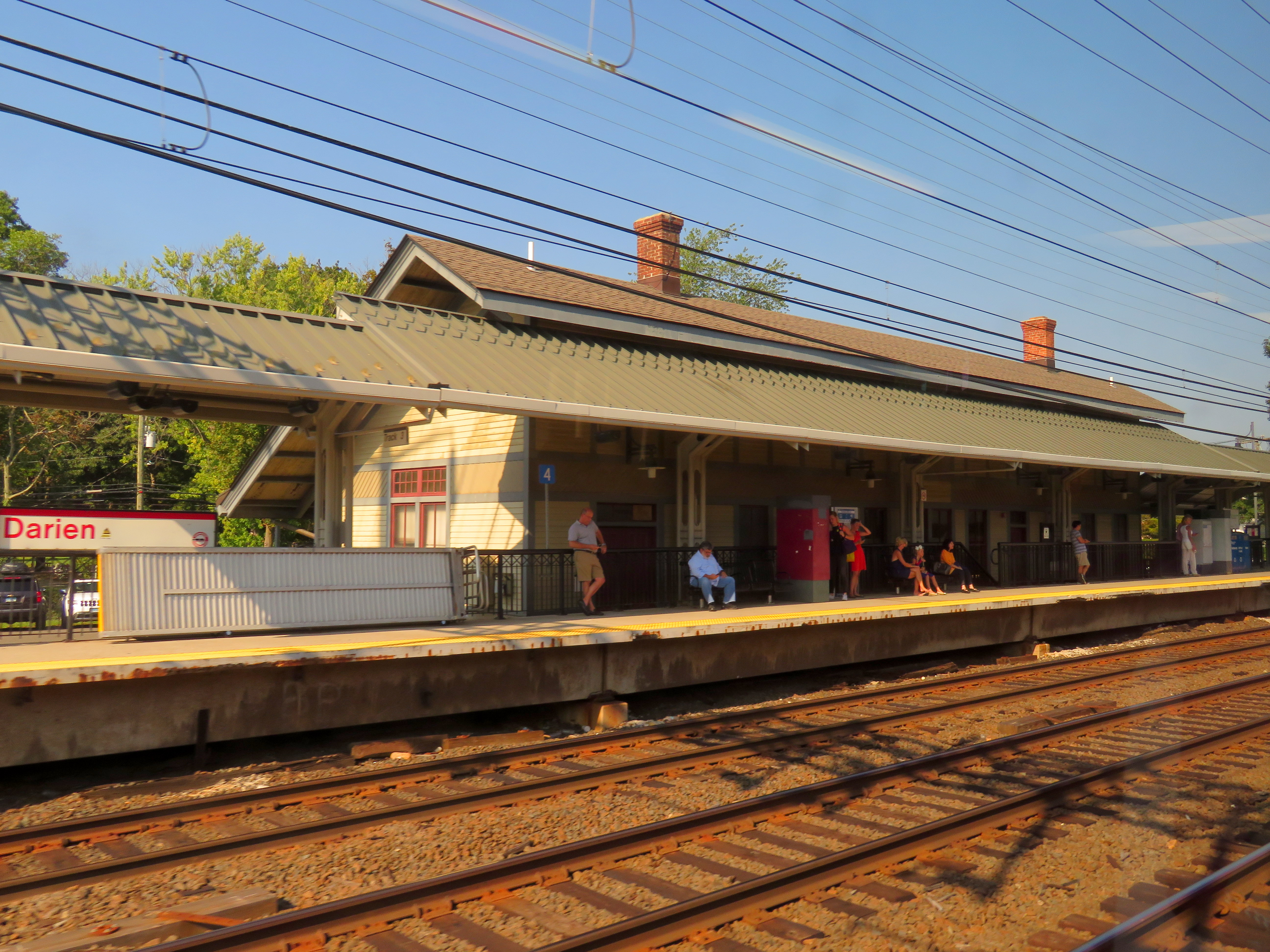
- Darien station building and platform in September 2018

General information
- Location: 33 West Avenue; Darien, Connecticut
- Coordinates: 41.078187°N 73.472958°W
- Owner: ConnDOT
- Line: ConnDOT New Haven Line (Northeast Corridor)
- Platforms: 2 side platforms
- Tracks: 4
- Connections: CTTransit Stamford: 341, 342, 344

Construction
- Parking: 860 spaces
- Accessible: Yes

Other information
- Fare zone: 16

History
- Opened: December 25, 1848

Passengers
- 2018: 1,873 daily boardings

Services
| Preceding station | Metro-North Railroad | Following station |
|---|---|---|
| Noroton Heights toward Grand Central | New Haven Line | Rowayton toward New Haven or New Haven State Street |
| Noroton Heights toward Grand Central | Danbury Branch weekday service | Rowayton toward Danbury |
Former services
| Preceding station | New York, New Haven and Hartford Railroad | Following station |
|---|---|---|
| Noroton toward New York | Main Line | Rowayton toward New Haven |
Location

Darien station is a commuter rail station on the Metro-North Railroad New Haven Line, located in Darien, Connecticut. Located in downtown Darien, the station has two accessible side platforms serving the outer tracks of the four-track New Haven Line.

== Station layout ==
The station has two accessible high-level side platforms, each 10 cars long. The two inner tracks, not adjacent to either platform, are used only by express trains.

Several parking lots on both sides of the tracks serve the station with a total of 860 spaces. The state owns the parking lots nearest the Post Road and on the west (south) side of the tracks between the Post Road and Leroy Avenue (with 195 spaces). The town owns the "Leroy West" parking lot at the corner of Leroy and West Avenues (toward New York City).

== History ==
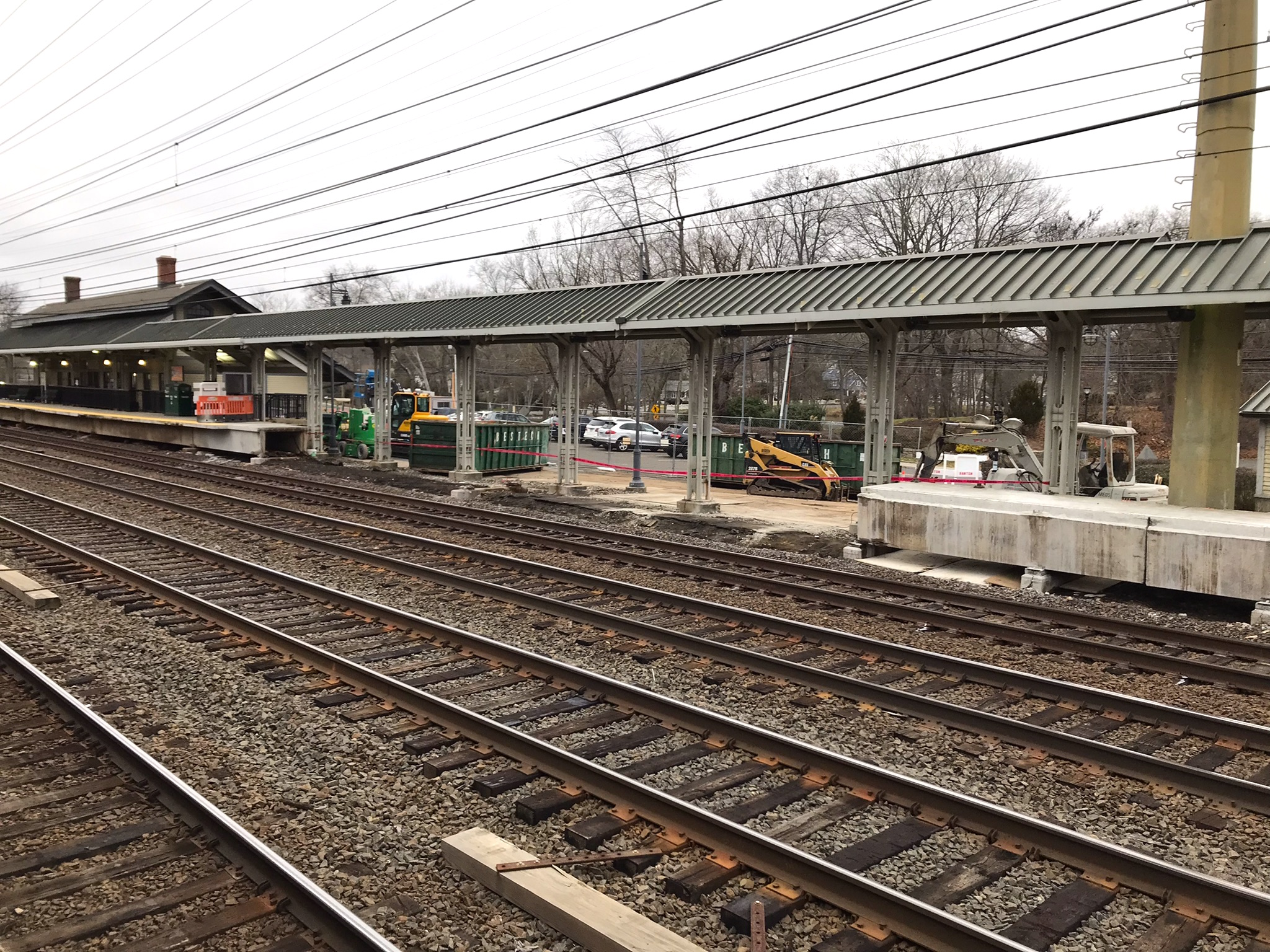
Platform reconstruction in December 2023

Downtown Darien, originally known as "Darien Depot", grew up around the train station, replacing the Noroton commercial district (2–3 miles to the east, along the Post Road) by the 1870s. By then, the train connection to New York City allowed wealthy New Yorkers to build vacation homes along the shore, beginning Darien's history as a wealthy suburb.

In the 1890s, the railroad tracks were raised above the street level, creating the railroad bridges over the Post Road, which marks the east side of the station, and over Leroy Avenue, at the western end. A Chinese laundry business has been located near the station since the 1890s, operated by various owners. The historic station building was rehabilitated in 2002.

In 2017, a state report concluded that Darien was the highest priority station in the state for needed repairs. By October 2020, platform replacement and accessibility improvements totaling $34M were planned to begin in February 2022. The project ultimately began in November 2023. As of November 2025, the project is scheduled to be completed in the summer of 2026.
