= Noroton Heights, Connecticut =

Census-designated place in Connecticut, United States

- Census-designated place
- Village of Noroton Heights
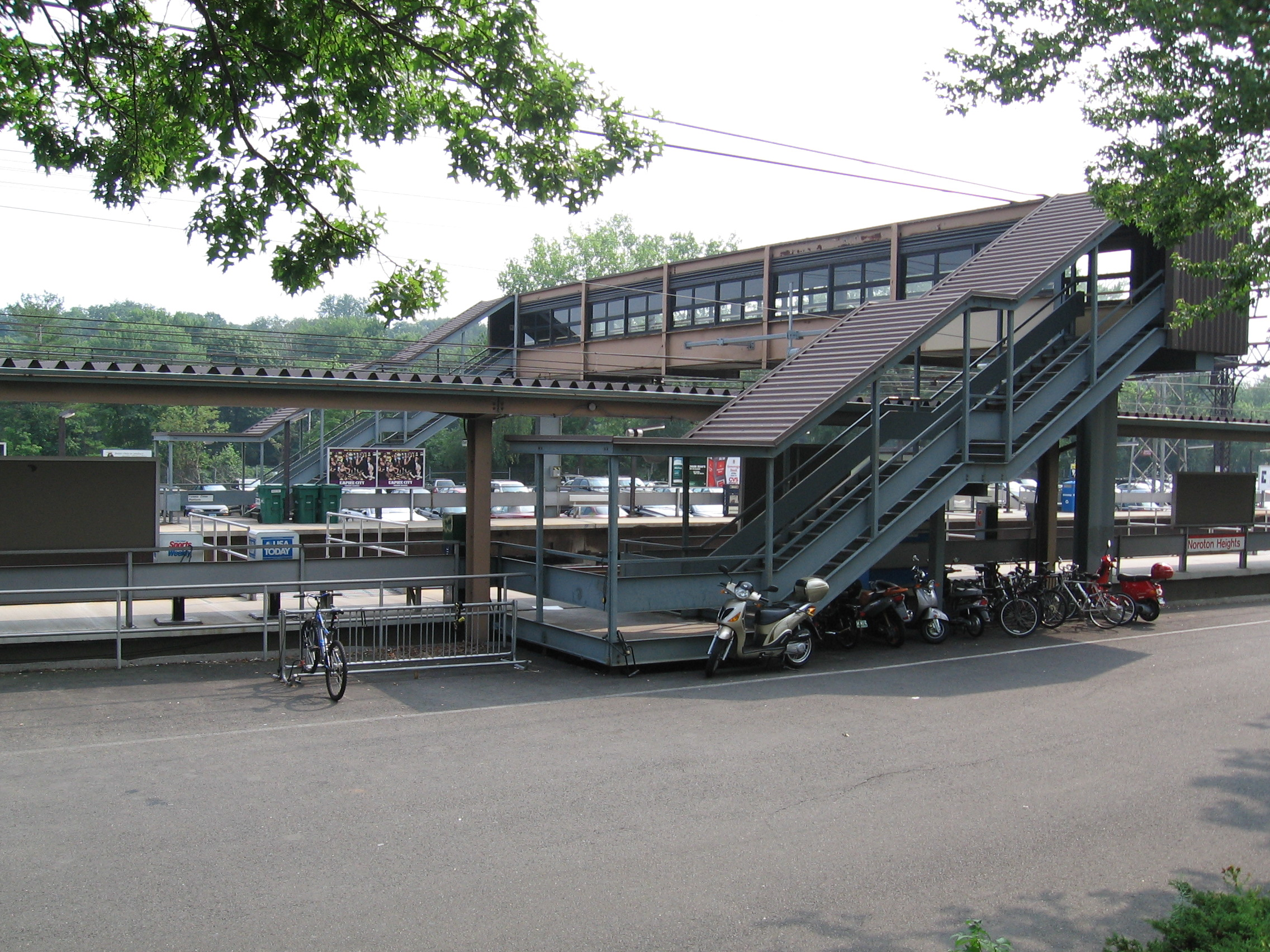
- Noroton Heights station is a stop on the New Haven Line

- Location within Connecticut Location within the United States
- Coordinates: 41°4′14″N 73°29′56″W
- Country: United States
- State: Connecticut
- County: Fairfield
- NECTA: Bridgeport-Stamford-Norwalk
- Region: Western CT
- Town: Darien

Area
  - Total: 0.88 sq mi (2.27 km^{2})
  - Land: 0.88 sq mi (2.27 km^{2})
  - Water: 0 sq mi (0.0 km^{2}) 0.0%
- Elevation: 98 ft (30 m)

Population (2020)
  - Total: 3,116
  - Density: 3,555.3/sq mi (1,372.69/km^{2})
- Time zone: UTC-5 (Eastern (EST))
  - Summer (DST): UTC-4 (EDT)
- ZIP Code: 06820 (Darien)
- Area codes: 203/475
- FIPS code: 09-53610
- GNIS feature ID: 2805055

Noroton Heights is a village and census-designated place (CDP) in the town of Darien, Connecticut, United States. The community is located on Connecticut's Gold Coast. Located close to Long Island Sound, in the Connecticut panhandle, it is approximately 35 miles (56 km) northeast of Midtown Manhattan and immediately to the east of Stamford. As of the 2020 census, the CDP has a population of 3,116.

Noroton Heights is bordered by Stamford to the west, Noroton to the south, and downtown Darien to the northeast. It primarily serves as a bedroom community to office centers in Stamford, Norwalk, and Manhattan. Noroton is served by Exits 10 and 11 on Interstate 95. A 49-minute commute to Manhattan is offered at the Metro-North train station, located downtown.

== Demographics ==
=== 2020 census ===
As of the 2020 census, Noroton Heights had a population of 3,116. The median age was 38.1 years. 31.3% of residents were under the age of 18 and 11.8% of residents were 65 years of age or older. For every 100 females there were 95.1 males, and for every 100 females age 18 and over there were 92.0 males age 18 and over.

100.0% of residents lived in urban areas, while 0.0% lived in rural areas.

There were 1,028 households in Noroton Heights, of which 52.0% had children under the age of 18 living in them. Of all households, 71.1% were married-couple households, 9.2% were households with a male householder and no spouse or partner present, and 18.4% were households with a female householder and no spouse or partner present. About 14.0% of all households were made up of individuals and 7.7% had someone living alone who was 65 years of age or older.

There were 1,078 housing units, of which 4.6% were vacant. The homeowner vacancy rate was 1.7% and the rental vacancy rate was 2.3%.

Racial composition as of the 2020 census
Race	Number	Percent
White	2,565	82.3%
Black or African American	50	1.6%
American Indian and Alaska Native	1	0.0%
Asian	225	7.2%
Native Hawaiian and Other Pacific Islander	0	0.0%
Some other race	47	1.5%
Two or more races	228	7.3%
Hispanic or Latino (of any race)	187	6.0%
