= Pear Tree Point School =

School in Connecticut, United States

Coordinates: 41.0492°N 73.4822°W

Pear Tree Point School was a co-educational private day school, grades Pre-Kindergarten-Grade 6 in Darien, Connecticut.

It was the only school in the state of Connecticut which officially used the "Core Knowledge" program. The school kept its class sizes at a maximum of 15 students. When class size exceeded 10 students a second teaching professional was added. The group sizes for reading and mathematics classes were smaller.

It was founded in 1996. In October 2017, it was announced the school would close. After town officials announced the Town of Darien would not be buying the property, the five-acre plot was sold to a private trust.

== At a Glance ==
Classroom Teacher -student ratio: 1:10; Grades: Pre-Kindergarten-Grade 6; Founded: 1996; Towns represented: Darien, Norwalk, New Canaan, Stamford, Wilton, Westport, Greenwich, Fairfield and Southport; Financial aid: Yes; Campus: Darien; Graduates: Attend area private (70%), public (25%) and international (5%) schools.

== Curriculum ==
Reading, mathematics and writing. Social studies Core Knowledge Foundation, art, music, drama, science, physical education, Spanish and Mandarin.

== Curriculum ==
Reading, writing and mathematics; social studies (based on the Core Knowledge curriculum) has international orientation. Drama, physical education, Spanish and Mandarin also taught. Use of technology across all grades and subjects.

== Achievement ==
Core Virtues , all-school assemblies and community service are emphasized. Connecticut National Geography Bee: In the last nine years before its closing Pear Tree Point School has sent five students to the Connecticut Geography Bee. Johns Hopkins Center for Talented Youth Talent Search: Annually, the majority of Pear Tree Point School students qualified for recognition by scoring in the top 5% nationally in standardized tests. In 2016 70% of students qualified for this academic recognition. Johns Hopkins University Center for Talented Youth had designated Pear Tree Point School as a "Top School." Knowledge Masters National Competition: Pear Tree Point School teams have been Knowledge Masters National Fifth Grade Champions four times by demonstrating excellence in American and world history, geography, literature, math, science and fine arts. Middle School placements: students have attended most competitive middle schools in the region and abroad.

== Extracurricular activities ==
After school programs included: Arts and Crafts, Chess, Cooking, Dance, Drama, Sports.
