= Noroton Heights station =

Metro-North Railroad station in Connecticut

Noroton Heights
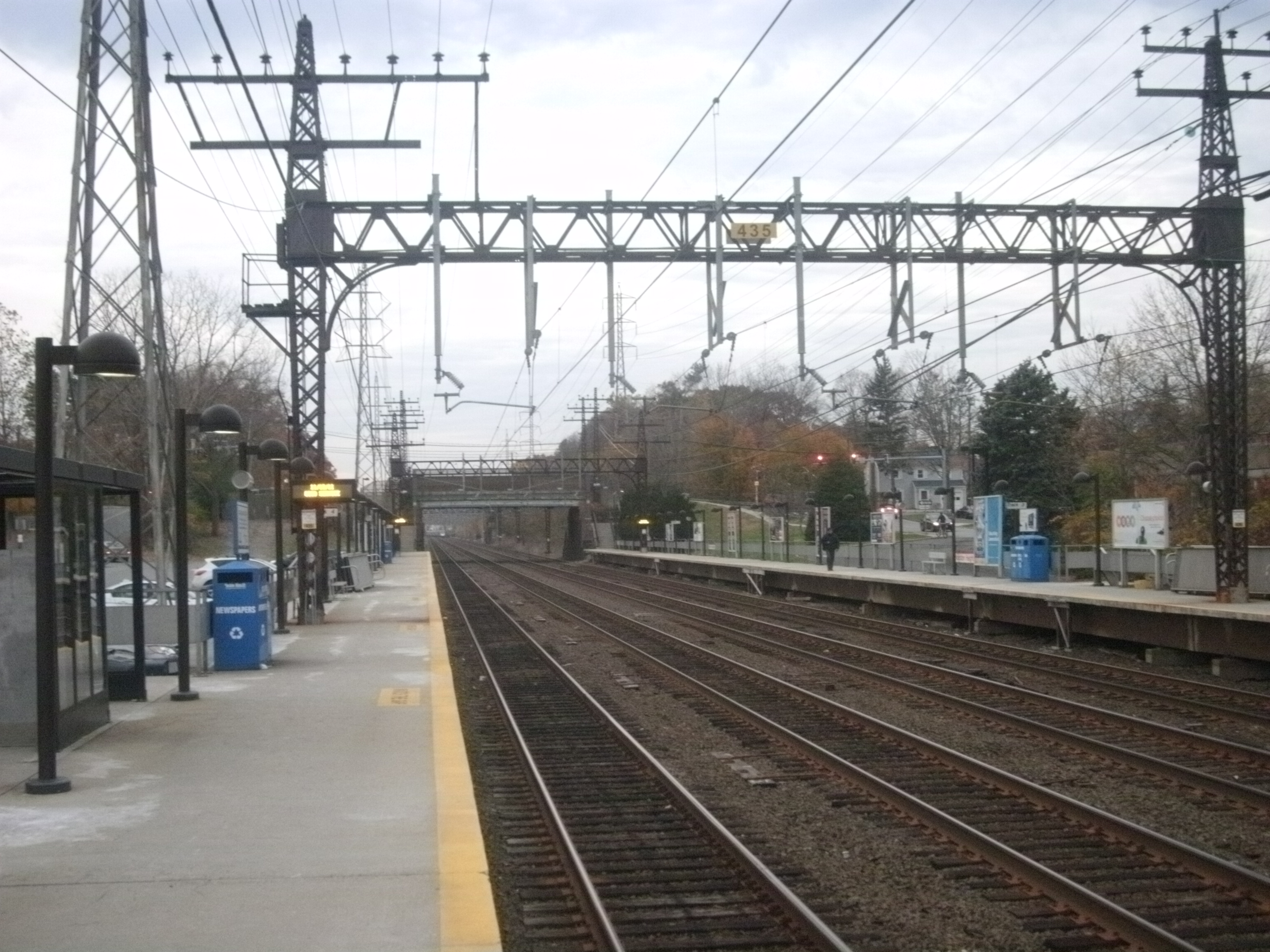
- Noroton Heights station in November 2011

General information
- Location: 325 Heights Road; Darien, Connecticut
- Coordinates: 41.069020°N 73.49752°W
- Owner: ConnDOT
- Line: ConnDOT New Haven Line (Northeast Corridor)
- Platforms: 2 side platforms
- Tracks: 4
- Connections: CTtransit Stamford: 344

Construction
- Parking: 772 spaces

Other information
- Fare zone: 16

History
- Rebuilt: March 13, 1972–May 28, 1974

Key dates
- January 15, 1972: Station agent eliminated

Passengers
- 2018: 1,460 daily boardings

Services
Preceding station	Metro-North Railroad	Following station
Stamford toward Grand Central	New Haven Line	Darien toward New Haven or New Haven State Street
Stamford toward Grand Central	Danbury Branch weekday service	Darien toward Danbury
Former services
Preceding station	New York, New Haven and Hartford Railroad	Following station
Glenbrook toward New York	Main Line	Darien toward New Haven
Location

Noroton Heights station is a commuter rail station on the Metro-North Railroad New Haven Line located in the Noroton Heights neighborhood of Darien, Connecticut.

== Station layout ==
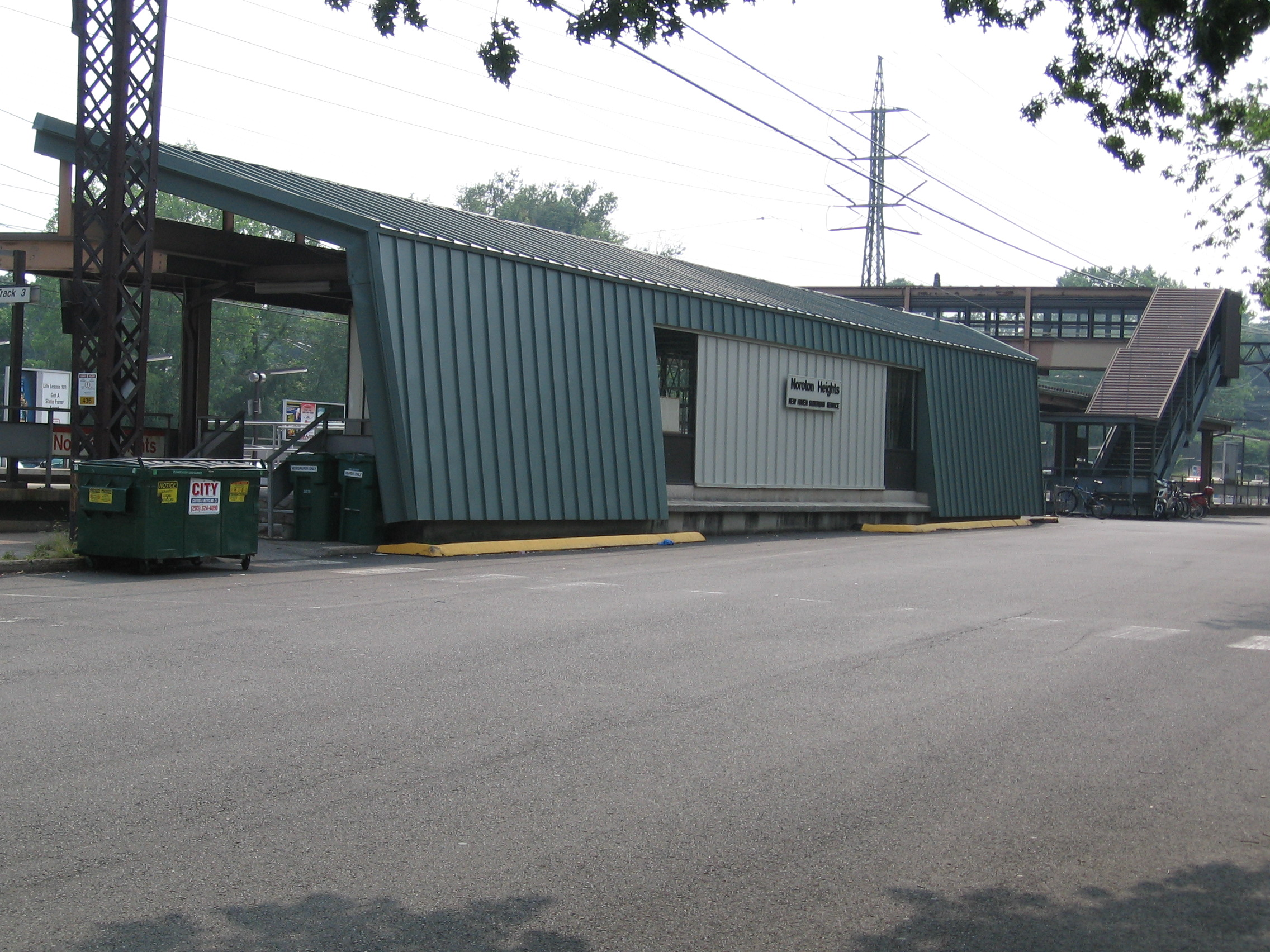
The station shelter in 2007

The station has two high-level side platforms that serve the outer tracks of the four-track Northeast Corridor. The northern (westbound) platform is 10 cars long, while the southern platform is 9 cars long.

The Noroton Heights station building is "unique in that it resembles an overgrown Plexiglass [sic] shelter protected by a metal lean-to," according to a January 2007 Connecticut Department of Transportation report. The Noroton Heights station is not compliant with the Americans with Disabilities Act. All the railroad parking at the station (772 spaces) is owned by the state. The farthest available parking spaces are as much as 1,500 feet from the station.

== History ==
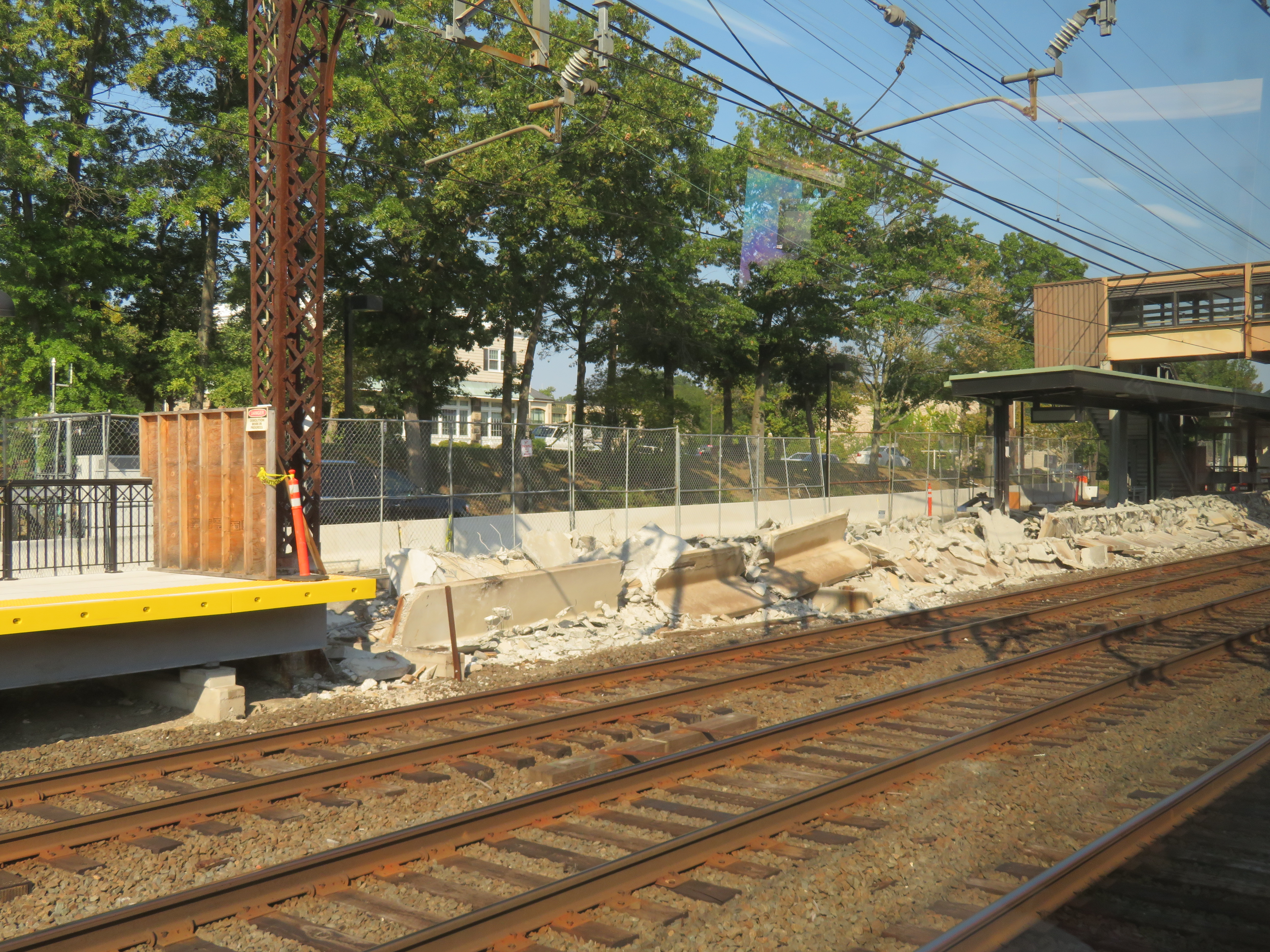
Westbound platform reconstruction in 2018

As of January 2007, Northeast Utilities had plans to put an underground 345-kV cable along the south edge of the eastbound parking lot (just north of Interstate 95). The state Department of Transportation agreed to the location because it would "minimize the potential impact to any future parking structure built at this site."

In 1989, the attractive former station building was slated for demolition. Instead, a group of Darien residents changed it into "The Depot", a youth center. The building remains at the far end of the train station, near the intersection of Noroton Avenue and Heights Road. Across the train tracks from "The Depot" is the Post 53 ambulance unit (which previously occupied "The Depot" building before moving into its current headquarters).

In recent years the town government of Darien has been collecting parking revenue from the station, which has gone into an improvement fund. The stairs leading to Hollow Tree Ridge Road were replaced in late 2010 along with new lighting being installed. Renovations will also include an update to the overpass (which will be closed for renovations starting June 6, 2011). The improvement project is running behind schedule with the original completion date being December 2010, no new date has been announced.

A $8 million reconstruction of the station platforms began in March 2017, with completion then planned for late 2018.
