= Moses Mather =

Moses Mather (23 February 1719 in Lyme, Connecticut – 21 September 1806 in Darien, Connecticut), was a Connecticut clergyman.

== Biography ==
He graduated from Yale University in 1739, and was ordained over the Congregational church in Darien in 1744, which post he held until his death. During the American Revolutionary War, he was several times imprisoned as a patriot. Princeton University gave him the degree of D.D. in 1791.

He was noted as a controversialist. He published Infant Baptism Defended (1759), and Election Sermons (1781).
