= The Darien Times =

Newspaper published in Darien, Connecticut

- Type: Weekly newspaper
- Publisher: Hearst Communications Inc.
- City: Darien, Connecticut
- Country: United States
- Circulation: 6,454
- Website: darientimes.com

The Darien Times is a weekly newspaper that focuses on local news of Darien, CT. The paper covers Darien's news, politics, sports, schools, and feature stories. The paper publishes a monthly section on arts and entertainment, as well. It also includes columns from local voices. It is distributed every Thursday. The paper is published by Hearst Communications inc., a news and multimedia firm.
