= Tokeneke, Connecticut =

Census-designated place in Connecticut, United States

- Census-designated place
- Location within Connecticut Location within the United States
- Coordinates: 41°3′57″N 73°27′54″W
- Country: United States
- State: Connecticut
- County: Fairfield
- Town: Darien

Area
  - Total: 3.98 sq mi (10.31 km^{2})
  - Land: 2.34 sq mi (6.06 km^{2})
  - Water: 1.64 sq mi (4.25 km^{2}) 41.2%
- Elevation: 49 ft (15 m)

Population (2020)
  - Total: 2,794
  - Density: 700/sq mi (271/km^{2})
- Time zone: UTC-5 (Eastern (EST))
  - Summer (DST): UTC-4 (EDT)
- ZIP Code: 06820 (Darien)
- Area codes: 203/475
- FIPS code: 09-76150
- GNIS feature ID: 2805056

Tokeneke is a census-designated place (CDP) in the town of Darien, Connecticut, United States. It comprises the southeastern part of the town, occupying several peninsulas and islands that extend into Long Island Sound, between the Goodwives River and Noroton to the west and the Fivemile River to the east. It is bordered to the north by Darien Downtown and to the east by the city of Norwalk.

Tokeneke was first listed as a CDP prior to the 2020 census.

== Demographics ==
=== 2020 census ===
As of the 2020 census, Tokeneke had a population of 2,794. The median age was 41.6 years. 29.8% of residents were under the age of 18 and 13.8% of residents were 65 years of age or older. For every 100 females there were 95.1 males, and for every 100 females age 18 and over there were 92.4 males age 18 and over.

100.0% of residents lived in urban areas, while 0.0% lived in rural areas.

There were 869 households in Tokeneke, of which 45.5% had children under the age of 18 living in them. Of all households, 74.8% were married-couple households, 7.9% were households with a male householder and no spouse or partner present, and 15.1% were households with a female householder and no spouse or partner present. About 14.9% of all households were made up of individuals and 9.7% had someone living alone who was 65 years of age or older.

There were 973 housing units, of which 10.7% were vacant. The homeowner vacancy rate was 2.3% and the rental vacancy rate was 13.5%.

Racial composition as of the 2020 census
Race	Number	Percent
White	2,467	88.3%
Black or African American	10	0.4%
American Indian and Alaska Native	4	0.1%
Asian	87	3.1%
Native Hawaiian and Other Pacific Islander	0	0.0%
Some other race	37	1.3%
Two or more races	189	6.8%
Hispanic or Latino (of any race)	158	5.7%
