= Darien Downtown, Connecticut =

Census-designated place in Connecticut, United States

- Census-designated place
- Location within Connecticut Location within the United States
- Coordinates: 41°4′36″N 73°28′13″W
- Country: United States
- State: Connecticut
- County: Fairfield
- Town: Darien

Area
  - Total: 0.80 sq mi (2.08 km^{2})
  - Land: 0.79 sq mi (2.04 km^{2})
  - Water: 0.015 sq mi (0.04 km^{2})
- Elevation: 60 ft (18 m)
- Time zone: UTC-5 (Eastern (EST))
  - Summer (DST): UTC-4 (EDT)
- ZIP Code: 06820
- Area codes: 203/475
- FIPS code: 09-18936
- GNIS feature ID: 2805053

Darien Downtown is a census-designated place (CDP) in the town of Darien, Fairfield County, Connecticut, United States. As of the 2020 census, Darien Downtown had a population of 1,147. It represents the built-up center of town around the intersections of Route 1 (Boston Post Road), Route 124 (Mansfield Avenue), and Route 136 (Tokeneke Road). Interstate 95 passes through the southern part of the CDP, with access from Exit 11 (Route 1) and Exit 12 (Route 136). It was first listed as a CDP prior to the 2020 census.

== Demographics ==
=== 2020 census ===
As of the 2020 census, Darien Downtown had a population of 1,147. The median age was 40.7 years. 25.2% of residents were under the age of 18 and 19.5% of residents were 65 years of age or older. For every 100 females there were 91.2 males, and for every 100 females age 18 and over there were 78.0 males age 18 and over.

100.0% of residents lived in urban areas, while 0.0% lived in rural areas.

There were 494 households in Darien Downtown, of which 35.2% had children under the age of 18 living in them. Of all households, 52.4% were married-couple households, 14.4% were households with a male householder and no spouse or partner present, and 32.0% were households with a female householder and no spouse or partner present. About 35.6% of all households were made up of individuals and 24.5% had someone living alone who was 65 years of age or older.

There were 558 housing units, of which 11.5% were vacant. The homeowner vacancy rate was 3.2% and the rental vacancy rate was 17.3%.

Racial composition as of the 2020 census
| Race | Number | Percent |
|---|---|---|
| White | 888 | 77.4% |
| Black or African American | 17 | 1.5% |
| American Indian and Alaska Native | 1 | 0.1% |
| Asian | 69 | 6.0% |
| Native Hawaiian and Other Pacific Islander | 0 | 0.0% |
| Some other race | 14 | 1.2% |
| Two or more races | 158 | 13.8% |
| Hispanic or Latino (of any race) | 105 | 9.2% |
