= Noroton, Connecticut =

Census-designated place in Connecticut, United States

- Census-designated place
- Location within Connecticut Location within the United States
- Coordinates: 41°3′35″N 73°29′20″W
- Country: United States
- State: Connecticut
- County: Fairfield
- Town: Darien

Area
  - Total: 2.32 sq mi (6.00 km^{2})
  - Land: 1.81 sq mi (4.68 km^{2})
  - Water: 0.51 sq mi (1.32 km^{2}) 22%
- Elevation: 64 ft (20 m)

Population (2020)
  - Total: 5,317
  - Density: 2,295.2/sq mi (886.17/km^{2})
- Time zone: UTC-5 (Eastern (EST))
  - Summer (DST): UTC-4 (EDT)
- ZIP Code: 06820 (Darien)
- Area codes: 203/475
- FIPS code: 09-53540
- GNIS feature ID: 2805054

Noroton is a census-designated place (CDP) in the town of Darien, Fairfield County, Connecticut, United States. It occupies the southwestern part of Darien, from the Metro-North Railroad in the north to Long Island Sound in the south. The southern half of the community occupies Noroton Neck, between Holly Pond to the west and the Goodwives River to the east. It is bordered to the west by the city of Stamford and to the east by the Tokeneke neighborhood of Darien. To the north is Noroton Heights.

As of the 2020 census, Noroton had a population of 5,317.

It was first listed as a CDP prior to the 2020 census.

== Demographics ==
=== 2020 census ===
As of the 2020 census, Noroton had a population of 5,317. The median age was 40.1 years. 32.4% of residents were under the age of 18 and 13.0% of residents were 65 years of age or older. For every 100 females there were 95.7 males, and for every 100 females age 18 and over there were 89.4 males age 18 and over.

100.0% of residents lived in urban areas, while 0.0% lived in rural areas.

There were 1,746 households in Noroton, of which 49.1% had children under the age of 18 living in them. Of all households, 69.0% were married-couple households, 10.5% were households with a male householder and no spouse or partner present, and 18.9% were households with a female householder and no spouse or partner present. About 17.9% of all households were made up of individuals and 10.5% had someone living alone who was 65 years of age or older.

There were 1,833 housing units, of which 4.7% were vacant. The homeowner vacancy rate was 1.1% and the rental vacancy rate was 3.8%.

Racial composition as of the 2020 census
Race	Number	Percent
White	4,376	82.3%
Black or African American	45	0.8%
American Indian and Alaska Native	14	0.3%
Asian	414	7.8%
Native Hawaiian and Other Pacific Islander	0	0.0%
Some other race	86	1.6%
Two or more races	382	7.2%
Hispanic or Latino (of any race)	332	6.2%
