= Greenwood Avenue Historic District =

Historic district in Connecticut, United States

- U.S. National Register of Historic Places
- U.S. Historic district
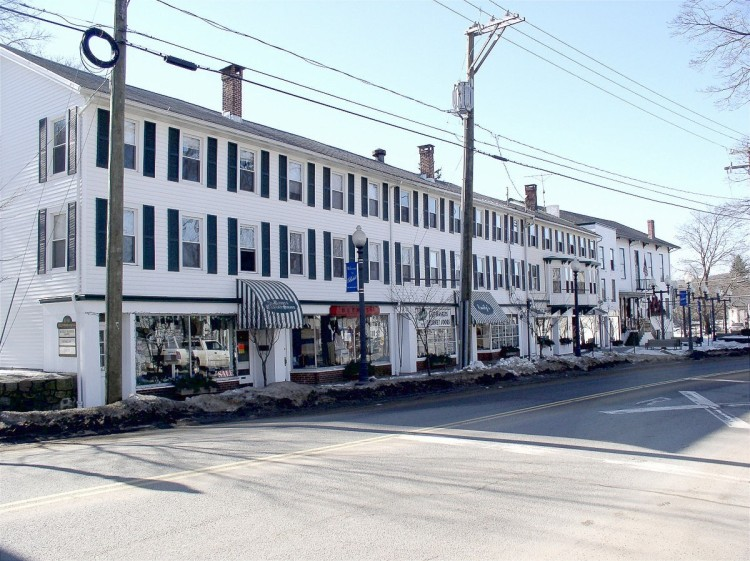

- Location within Connecticut Location within the United States
- Location: Roughly along Greenwood Avenue, P.T. Barnum Square, Depot Place, and South Street, Bethel, Connecticut
- Coordinates: 41°22′15.9″N 73°24′45.7″W
- Area: 21 acres (8.5 ha)
- Architectural style: Greek Revival, Italianate
- NRHP reference No.: 99001568
- Added to NRHP: December 17, 1999

The Greenwood Avenue Historic District encompasses the historic commercial village center of Bethel, Connecticut. Extending along Greenwood Avenue from P.T. Barnum Square to Depot Place, the district includes a variety of commercial and residential architecture from the mid-19th to early 20th centuries. The district was listed on the National Register of Historic Places in 1999.

== Description and history ==
Bethel began as a parish subdivision (established 1759) of Danbury, and was separately incorporated in 1855. Its early community center was located a short way northeast of Greenwood Avenue, at the site of the present Congregational church. In the early 19th century, the Greenwood Avenue area became home to a number of small hat factories, and commercial development along the avenue began in earnest after the railroad arrived in 1852. The eastern end of the downtown was anchored by the creation in 1881 of P.T. Barnum Square, donated to the town by native son P.T. Barnum.

The historic district includes 29 contributing buildings, 5 non-contributing buildings, and the town green, P. T. Barnum Square. It includes a former railroad station converted into a brewery, and a World War I Doughboy bronze statue sculpted by Ernest Moore Viquesney in P. T. Barnum Square. The oldest building in the district is the Seth Seelye House, built about 1842; it is a fine example of Greek Revival architecture, and now houses the public library. The Bethel Opera House, built as a Greek Revival building about 1848, was given an Italianate restyling, and served as a community gathering space for many years.

== See also ==
- National Register of Historic Places listings in Fairfield County, Connecticut
