= William Wakeman =

William Wakeman may refer to:

- William Frederick Wakeman, archaeologist
- William Wakeman (The Reaping)

== See also ==
- Polly and William Wakeman House
