= Pop Williams (American football) =

American football player (1906–1979)

No. 3, 4, 9, 7
- Position: Back

Personal information
- Born: May 4, 1906; Cannondale, Connecticut, U.S.
- Died: February 6, 1979 (aged 72); Brooklyn, Connecticut, U.S.
- Listed height: 6 ft 0 in (1.83 m)
- Listed weight: 207 lb (94 kg)

Career information
- High school: Killingly (Killingly, Connecticut)
- College: Connecticut

Career history
- Providence Steam Roller (1928–1931); Brooklyn Dodgers (1932); Mount Vernon Cardinals (1937)

Awards and highlights
- NFL champion (1928)
- Stats at Pro Football Reference

Arthur Vincent "Pop" Williams (May 4, 1906 – February 6, 1979) was an American professional football back who played five seasons in the National Football League (NFL) with the Providence Steam Roller and Brooklyn Dodgers. He played college football at Connecticut Agricultural College.

== Early life and college ==
Arthur Vincent Williams was born on May 4, 1906, in Cannondale, Connecticut. He attended Killingly High School in Killingly, Connecticut.

Williams was a member of the Connecticut Aggies of Connecticut Agricultural College from 1924 to 1927 and a three-year letterman from 1925 to 1927.

== Professional career ==
Williams played in seven games, starting five, for the Providence Steam Roller of the National Football League (NFL) in 1928, scoring three rushing touchdowns and one receiving touchdown. The Steam Roller finished first in the NFL with a 8–1–2 record. Williams appeared in all 12 games, starting eight, in 1929, rushing for six touchdowns while also catching one touchdown. Providence finished the 1929 season seventh place in the league with a 4–6–2 record. He played in all 11 games, starting eight, during the 1930 season and scored two rushing touchdowns as the Steam Roller went 6–4–1. He appeared in eight games, starting two, in 1931.

Williams played in one game for the Brooklyn Dodgers of the NFL during the 1932 season.

Williams appeared in six games, all starts, for the Mount Vernon Cardinals of the American Association in 1937 and rushed for one touchdown.

== Personal life ==
Williams died on February 5, 1979, in Brooklyn, Connecticut.
