= Cannondale station =

Metro-North Railroad station in Connecticut

Cannondale
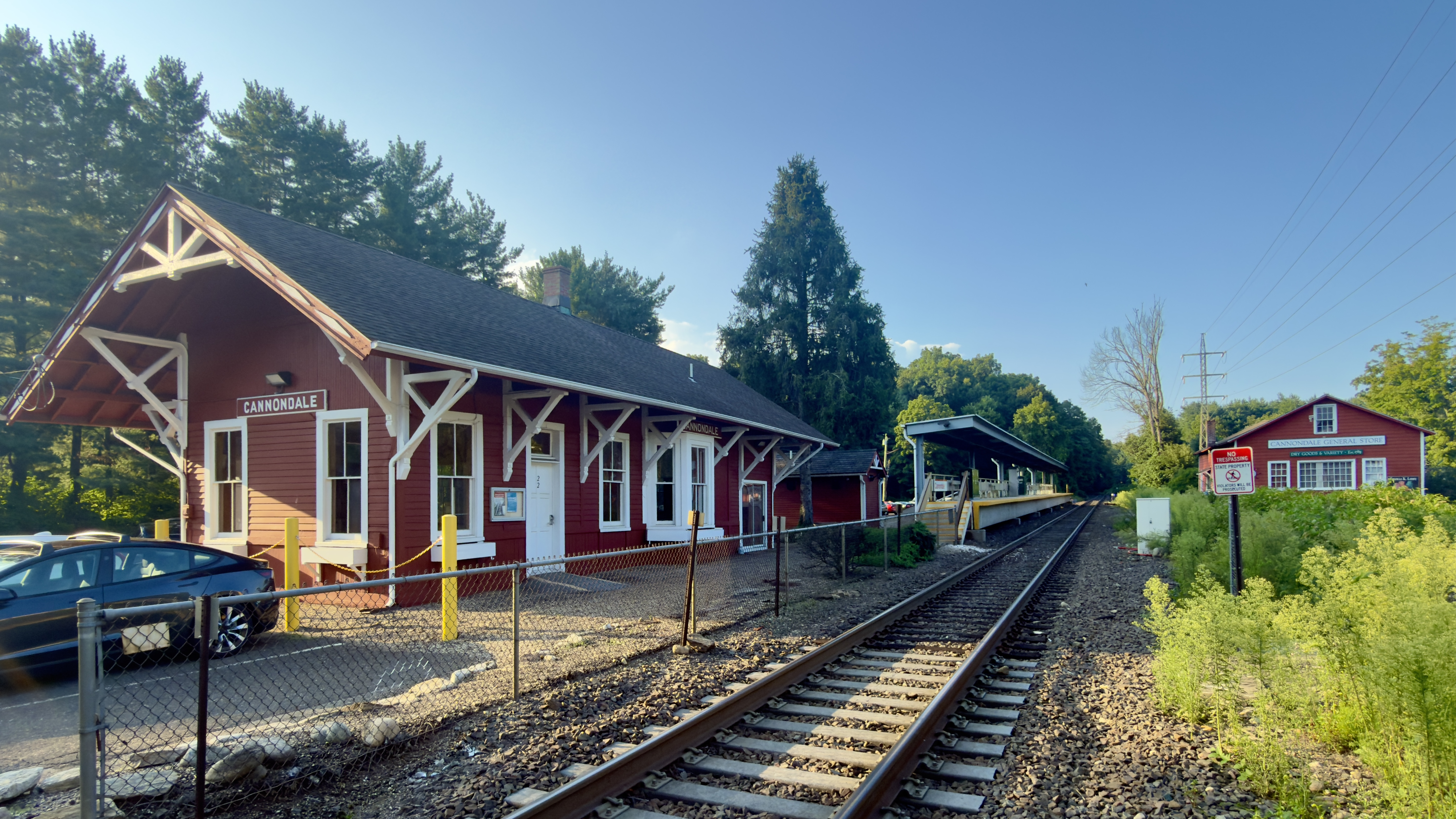
- Cannondale station in August 2026

General information
- Location: 22 Cannon Road; Wilton, Connecticut
- Coordinates: 41°13′0″N 73°25′36″W
- Owner: Connecticut Department of Transportation and the Town of Wilton
- Operator: Metro-North Railroad
- Platforms: 1 side platform
- Tracks: 1
- Connections: Norwalk Transit District: Route 7 Link

Construction
- Parking: 140 spaces
- Accessible: yes

Other information
- Fare zone: 41

Passengers
- 2018: 167 daily boardings

Services
| Preceding station | Metro-North Railroad | Following station |
|---|---|---|
| Wilton toward South Norwalk, Stamford or Grand Central | Danbury Branch | Branchville toward Danbury |
Former services
| Preceding station | New York, New Haven and Hartford Railroad | Following station |
|---|---|---|
| Wilton toward Norwalk and South Norwalk | Pittsfield Branch | Georgetown toward Pittsfield |
- Cannondale Station
- U.S. Historic district – Contributing property
- Built: 1892
- Part of: Cannondale Historic District (ID92001531)
- Designated CP: November 12, 1992
Location

Cannondale station is a commuter rail station on the Danbury Branch of the Metro-North Railroad's New Haven Line, located in the Cannondale neighborhood of Wilton, Connecticut. The station building was added to the National Register of Historic Places in 1992 as part of the Cannondale Historic District.

== History ==
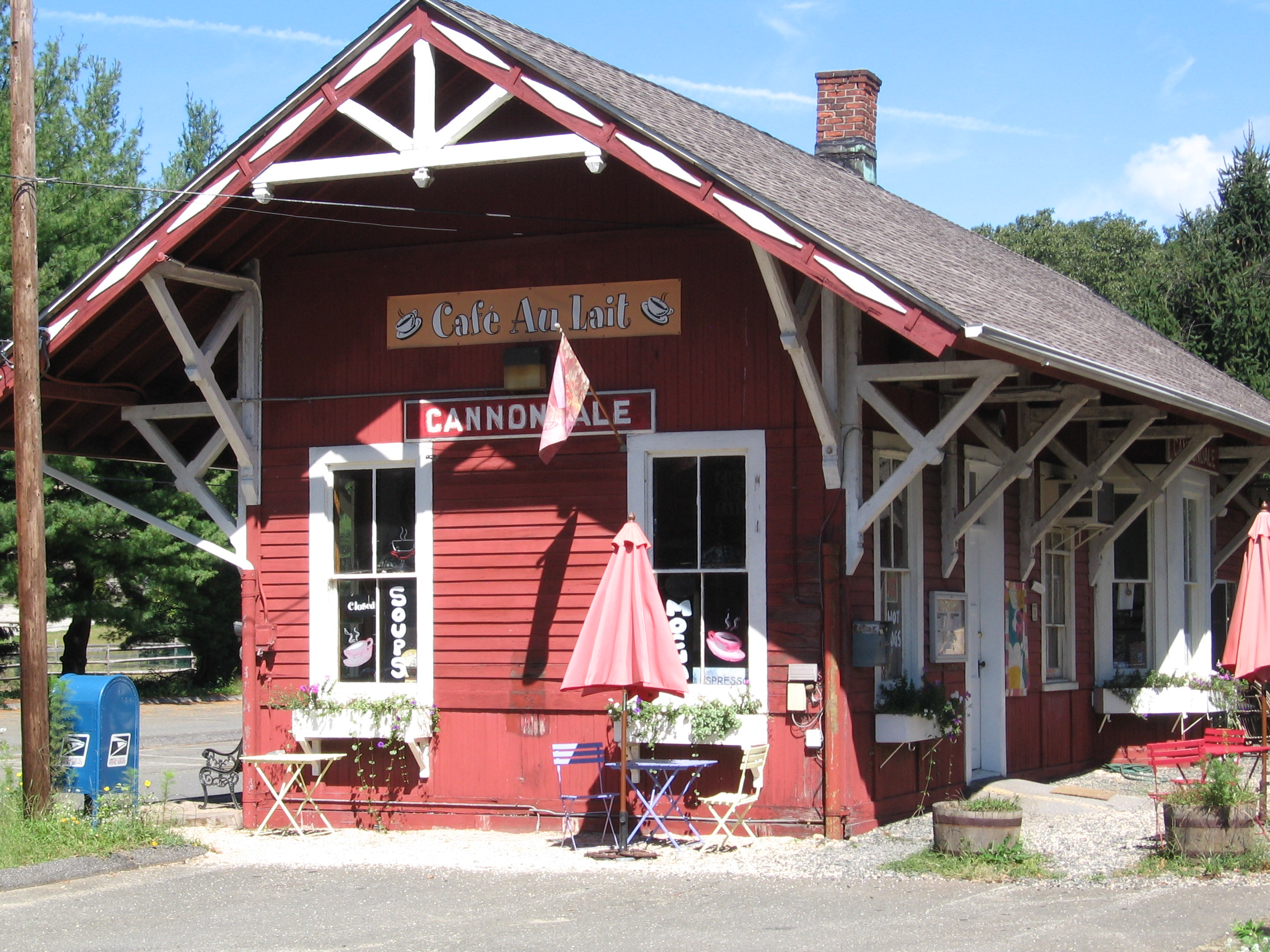
The historic station building in September 2007

The Danbury and Norwalk Railroad opened the line in late February 1852, with the official opening on March 1. Charles Cannon of Cannondale was the subcontractor who helped build the route through Wilton. The train cost passengers 30 cents to go to South Norwalk and 50 cents to Danbury at a time when the day's wages of a laborer might not be a dollar. Two trains made the trip up and down the line each day. In the first few years, a freshet and a flood from the Norwalk River twice shut down the line for repairs. The station made travel suddenly much quicker than stagecoach transportation. After a few years, when speeds picked up a bit on the line, it took 28 minutes to reach South Norwalk.

In its early years, the line had no more than 390 passengers a day using the service, and an average of 34 passengers per train. L. Peter Cornwall, a railroad historian, estimated that perhaps no more than a dozen people used Cannondale in its early years. Although there may have only been a flag stop (in which passengers or railroad employees raised a flag if they needed the train to stop), by 1856 it was a regular stopping point for all trains, and the stop was originally called Cannon's. In the early 1870s the station was no longer listed and was probably a flag stop. In the 1890s it was again listed as a station, now called Cannon. Just before World War I, the station name was changed to Cannondale. The station is currently a contributing property of the Cannondale Historic District, which has been on the National Register of Historic Places since 1992.

The Cafe au Lait coffee shop in the station house closed on March 31, 2010.

== Station layout ==
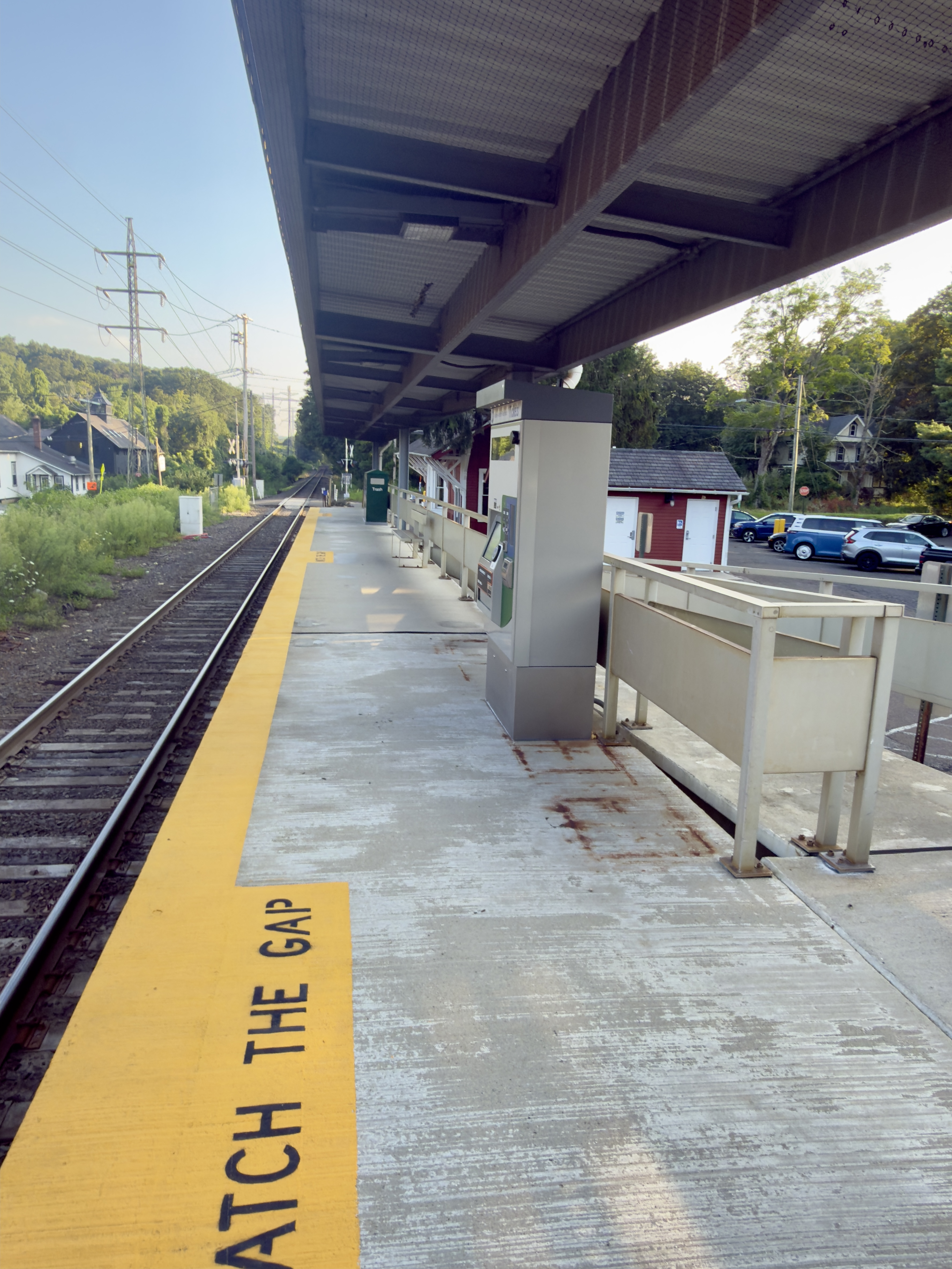
View from platform (facing south)

The station has a two-car-long high-level side platform west of the single track. Restrooms are located on the north side of the station house. The station has 140 free public parking spaces, all of which are managed by the Town of Wilton.
