= Bethel station =

Metro-North Railroad station in Connecticut

Bethel
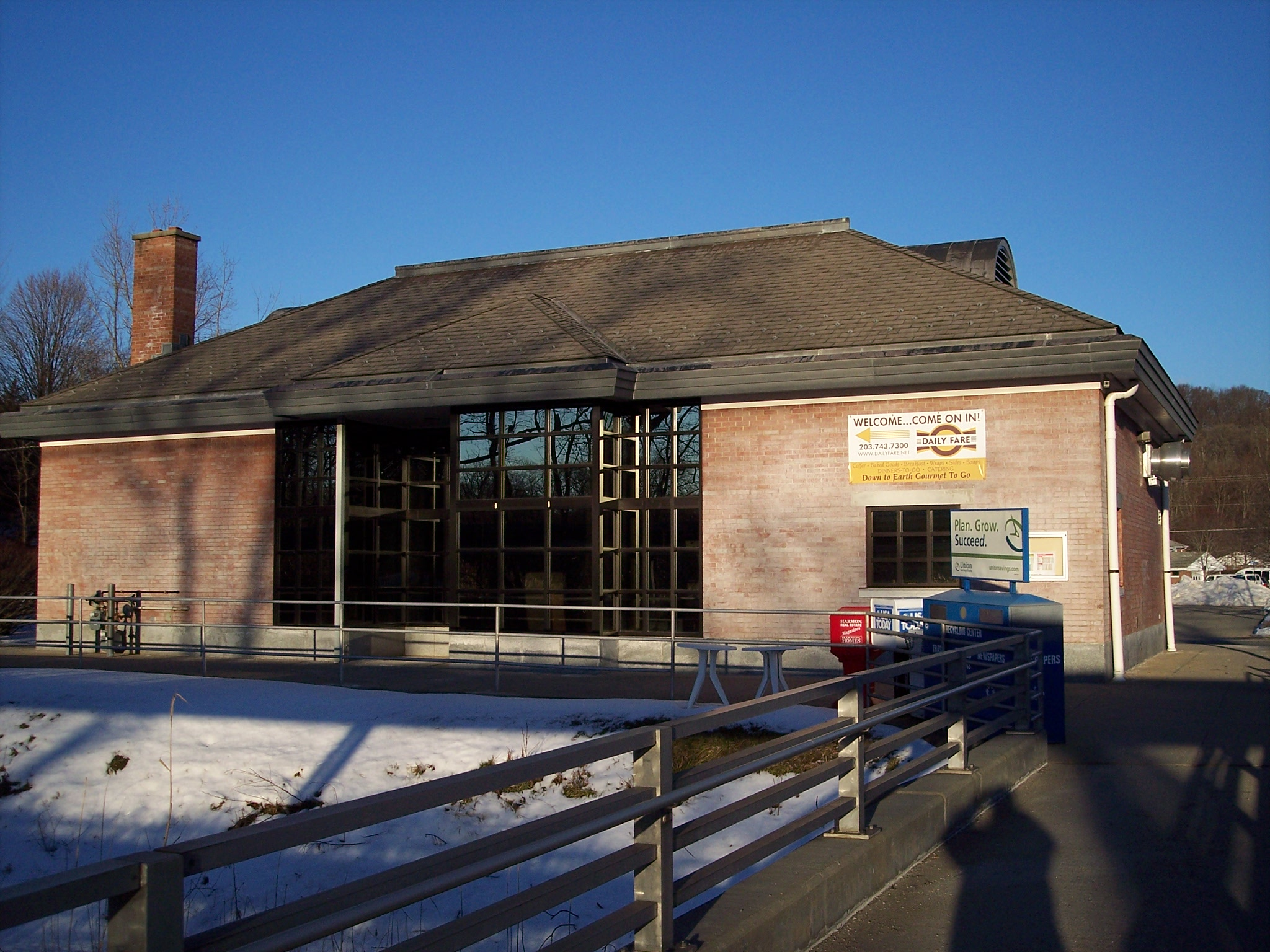
- Track side of Bethel station in 2011

General information
- Location: 13 Durant Avenue; Bethel, Connecticut
- Coordinates: 41.3760°N 73.4180°W
- Owner: Connecticut Department of Transportation
- Operator: Town of Bethel
- Platforms: 1 side platform
- Tracks: 1
- Connections: HARTransit: 5

Construction
- Parking: 197 spaces
- Accessible: yes

Other information
- Fare zone: 42

History
- Opened: 1852
- Rebuilt: 1996

Passengers
- 2018: 228 daily boardings

Services
Preceding station	Metro-North Railroad	Following station
Redding toward South Norwalk, Stamford or Grand Central	Danbury Branch	Danbury Terminus
Former services
Preceding station	New York, New Haven and Hartford Railroad	Following station
Redding toward Norwalk and South Norwalk	Pittsfield Branch	Danbury toward Pittsfield
Location

Bethel station is a commuter rail station on the Danbury Branch of the Metro-North Railroad New Haven Line, located in Bethel, Connecticut.

== History ==
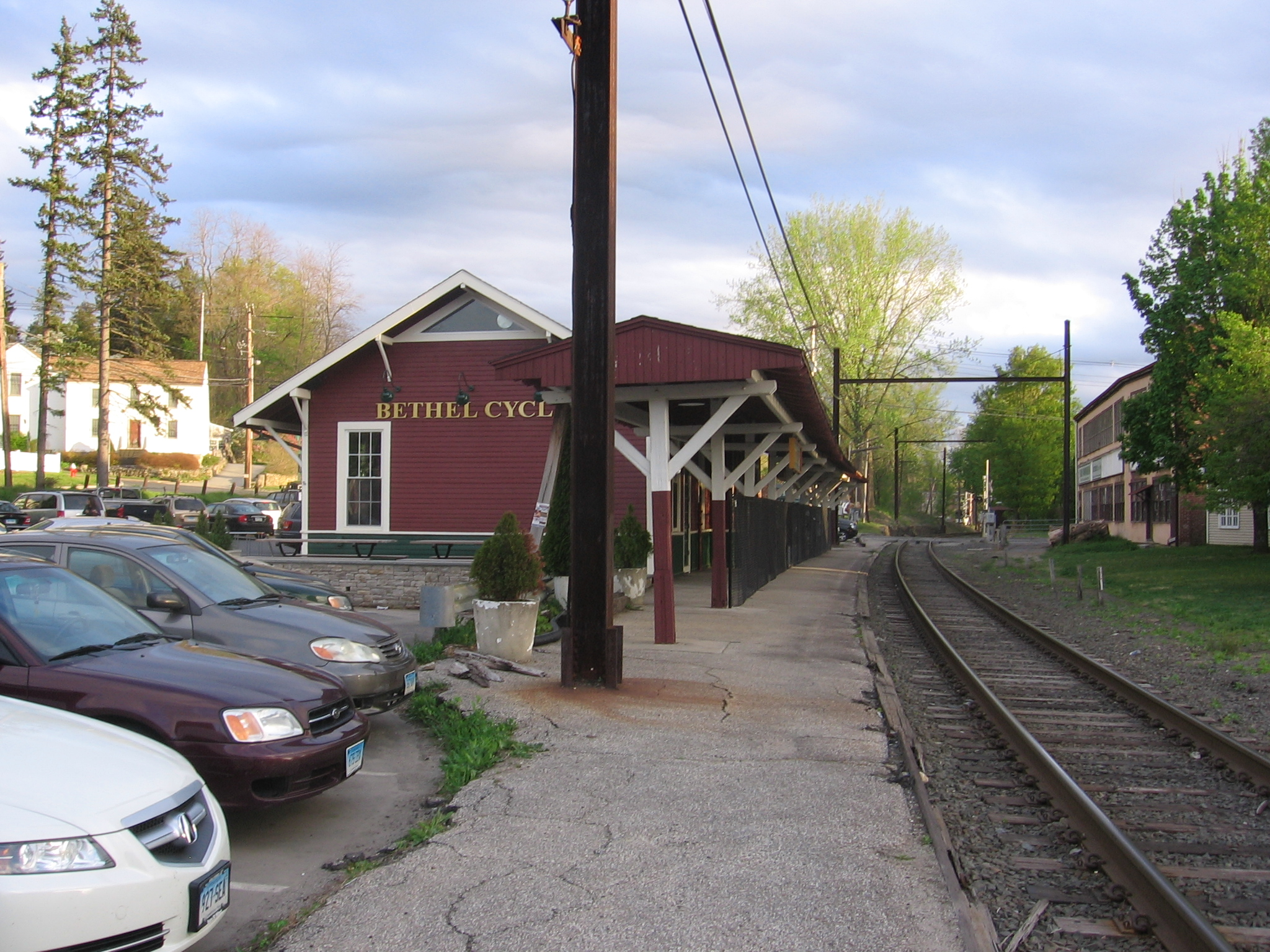
The former Bethel station in 2012

The original Bethel station opened in 1852 on the Danbury and Norwalk Railroad. The original station building eventually burned down on December 15, 1898, as a result of an overheated stove. The station was eventually replaced the following year in 1899. The 1899-built station served passengers until 1996, when it was taken out of service but not demolished. The current station on Durant Avenue was built in 1996 and succeeds the previous station on Depot Place. The old station is still standing, but trains no longer stop at it. The building subsequently became a bicycle shop, then a brewery.

== Station layout ==
The station has a five-car-long high-level side platform to the east of the single track. The station has 197 parking spaces, all owned by the state. Most of these are permit spaces, but there is also metered parking available. Two EV charging stations are also available. The station building is open during rush hours and has a bakery, seating area, and restroom, but no ticket machines. The station is operated by the town of Bethel, though it is owned by ConnDOT.
