= Bethel, Connecticut =

Town in Connecticut, United States

- Town
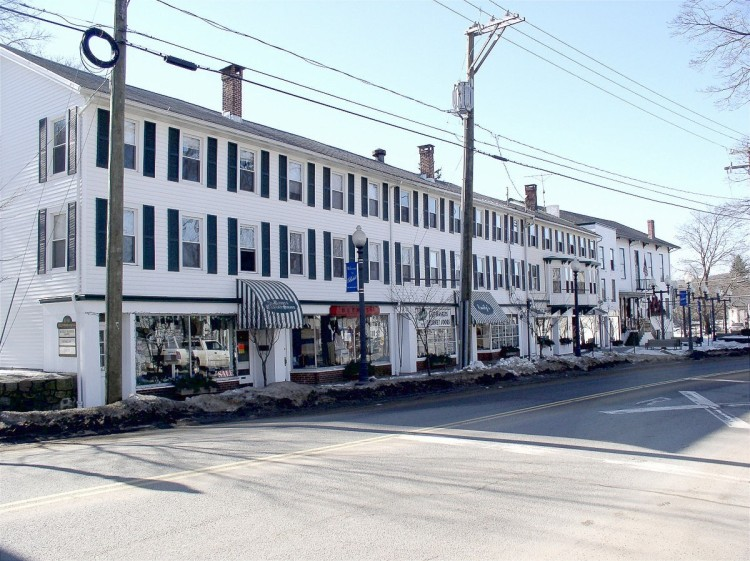
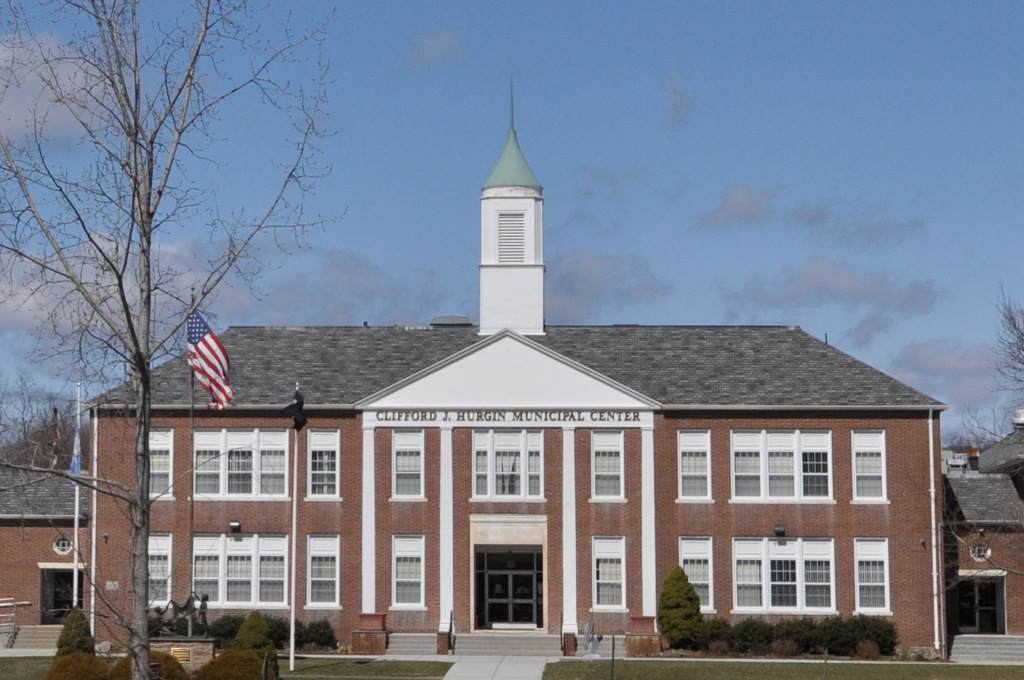
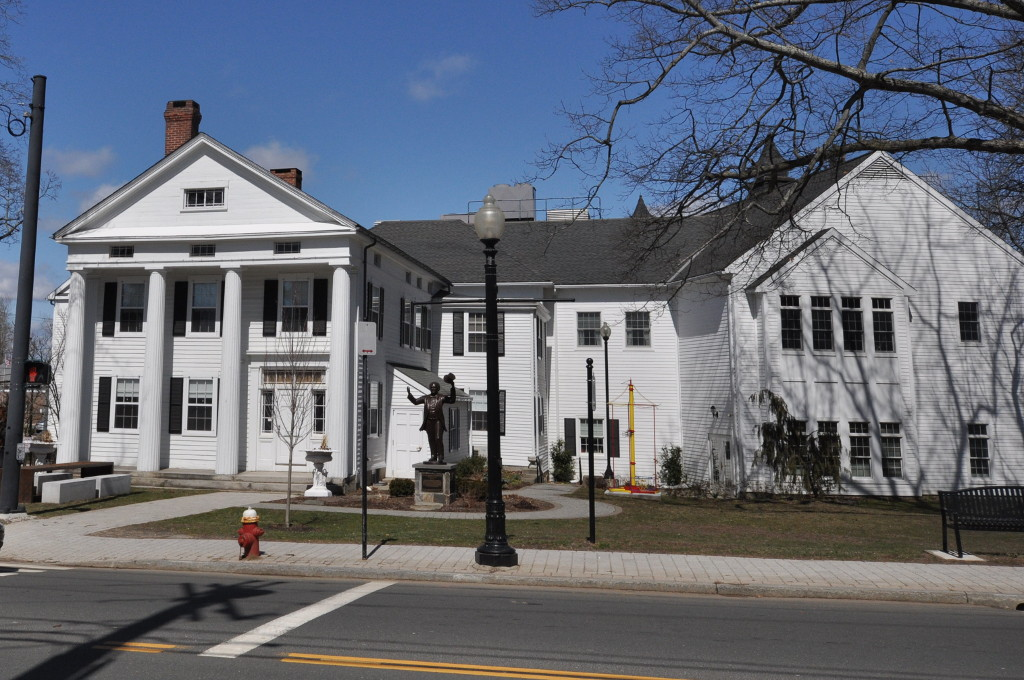
- Greenwood Avenue Historic District Town Hall Bethel Public Library (Seth Seelye House)

- Flag Seal

- Coordinates: 41°22′27″N 73°23′42″W
- Country: United States
- U.S. state: Connecticut
- County: Fairfield
- Region: Western CT
- Incorporated: 1855

Government
  - Type: Selectman-town meeting
  - First selectman: Dan Carter (R)
  - Selectman: Richard C. Straiton (D)
  - Selectman: Bryan Terzian (R)

Area
  - Total: 16.9 sq mi (43.8 km^{2})
  - Land: 16.8 sq mi (43.5 km^{2})
  - Water: 0.077 sq mi (0.2 km^{2})
- Elevation: 482 ft (147 m)

Population (2022)
  - Total: 20,156
  - Density: 1,204.6/sq mi (465.1/km^{2})
- Time zone: UTC-5 (Eastern)
  - Summer (DST): UTC-4 (Eastern)
- ZIP Code: 06801
- Area codes: 203/475
- FIPS code: 09-04720
- GNIS feature ID: 213390
- Website: www.bethel-ct.gov

Bethel (/ˈbɛθəl/) is a town in Fairfield County, Connecticut, United States. As of the 2020 census, the population of the town was 20,358. The town is part of the Western Connecticut Planning Region. The town includes the Bethel Census-Designated Place.

== History ==
Bethel was first settled around 1700. The town incorporated in 1855 from Danbury. Bethel is a name derived from Hebrew meaning "house of God".

In 1934, Rudolph Kunett started the first vodka distillery in the U.S. after purchasing rights to the recipe from the exiled Smirnoff family.

== Geography ==
According to the United States Census Bureau, the town has a total area of 16.9 square miles (44 km^{2}), of which 16.8 square miles (44 km^{2}) is land and 0.1 square miles (0.26 km^{2}), or 0.53%, is water. The Bethel CDP, corresponding to the town center, has a total area of 4.1 square miles (11 km^{2}), all land. Bethel borders Redding to the south, Danbury to the west, Brookfield to the north, and Newtown to the east.

== Demographics ==
Historical population
Year	Pop.	±%
1860	1,711	—
1870	2,311	+35.1%
1880	2,727	+18.0%
1890	3,401	+24.7%
1900	3,327	−2.2%
1910	3,792	+14.0%
1920	3,201	−15.6%
1930	3,886	+21.4%
1940	4,105	+5.6%
1950	5,104	+24.3%
1960	8,200	+60.7%
1970	10,945	+33.5%
1980	16,004	+46.2%
1990	17,541	+9.6%
2000	18,067	+3.0%
2010	18,584	+2.9%
2020	20,358	+9.5%

As of the 2010 census Bethel had a population of 18,585. The racial and ethnic composition of the population was 88.8% white, 1.8% black or African American, 0.1% Native American, 4.5% Asian, 2.8% from some other race and 1.9% from two or more races. 7.6% of the population was Hispanic or Latino from any race.

As of the census of 2000, there were 18,067 people, 6,505 households, and 4,846 families residing in the town. The population density was 1,075.7 inhabitants per square mile (415.3/km^{2}). There were 6,653 housing units at an average density of 396.1 per square mile (152.9/km^{2}). The racial makeup of the town in 2005 was 85.86% White, 1.91% African American, 0.26% Native American, 4.58% Asian, 0.04% Pacific Islander, 3.20% from other races or of multiple races. Hispanic or Latino of any race were 4.33% of the population. 20.2% were of Italian, 17.5% Irish, 9.1% German, 7.0% English, 6.7% American and 6.0% Polish ancestry according to Census 2000. 88.7% spoke English, 4.4% Spanish, 3.3% Portuguese, 1.5% German and 1.0% French as their first language.

There were 6,505 households, out of which 38.6% had children under the age of 18 living with them, 62.4% were married couples living together, 9.0% had a female householder with no husband present, and 25.5% were non-families. 20.6% of all households were made up of individuals, and 7.7% had someone living alone who was 65 years of age or older. The average household size was 2.76 and the average family size was 3.23.

In the town, the population was spread out, with 27.3% under the age of 18, 6.0% from 18 to 24, 31.9% from 25 to 44, 24.6% from 45 to 64, and 10.2% who were 65 years of age or older. The median age was 37 years. For every 100 females, there were 95.2 males. For every 100 females age 18 and over, there were 92.1 males.

The median income for a household in the town was $68,891, and the median income for a family was $78,358. Males had a median income of $51,816 versus $36,544 for females. The per capita income for the town was $28,927. About 1.2% of families and 2.5% of the population were below the poverty line, including 1.3% of those under age 18 and 5.5% of those age 65 or over.

== Economy ==
Battery manufacturer Duracell was headquartered in Bethel until summer 2026.

== Arts and culture ==
Sites listed on the National Register of Historic Places include Greenwood Avenue Historic District, Rev. John Ely House, and Seth Seelye House.

== Government ==
Bethel town vote by party in presidential elections
Year	Democratic	Republican	Third Parties
2024	53.79% 5,977	44.55% 4,950	1.66% 179
2020	56.12% 6,270	42.37% 4,734	1.51% 168
2016	48.52% 4,777	46.47% 4,575	5.02% 494
2012	51.18% 4,777	47.63% 4,445	1.19% 111
2008	53.57% 5,179	45.20% 4,370	1.23% 119
2004	46.74% 4,486	51.34% 4,927	1.92% 184
2000	48.50% 4,324	45.50% 4,057	6.00% 535
1996	46.62% 3,883	41.69% 3,472	11.69% 974
1992	34.04% 3,178	42.56% 3,974	23.40% 2,185
1988	36.41% 2,924	62.43% 5,013	1.16% 93
1984	29.09% 2,312	70.57% 5,610	0.34% 27
1980	32.24% 2,379	54.42% 4,015	13.34% 984
1976	41.54% 2,640	57.67% 3,665	0.79% 50
1972	30.88% 1,709	67.56% 3,739	1.55% 86
1968	39.80% 1,780	53.06% 2,373	7.13% 319
1964	65.63% 2,731	34.37% 1,430	0.00% 0
1960	44.86% 1,862	55.14% 2,289	0.00% 0
1956	24.59% 850	75.41% 2,607	0.00% 0

Voter Registration & Party Affiliation as of October 31, 2023
Party	Active voters	Inactive voters	Total voters	Percentage
Republican	3,126	240	3,366	23.9%
Democratic	3,985	326	4,311	30.6%
Unaffiliated	5,469	710	6,179	43.9%
Minor parties	199	26	225	1.6%
Total	12,779	1,302	14,081	100%

== Education ==
Bethel High School located in Bethel.

== Media ==
Movies partially shot in Bethel include: Rachel, Rachel (1968), Other People's Money (1991), and Revolutionary Road (2008).

== Infrastructure ==
=== Transportation ===
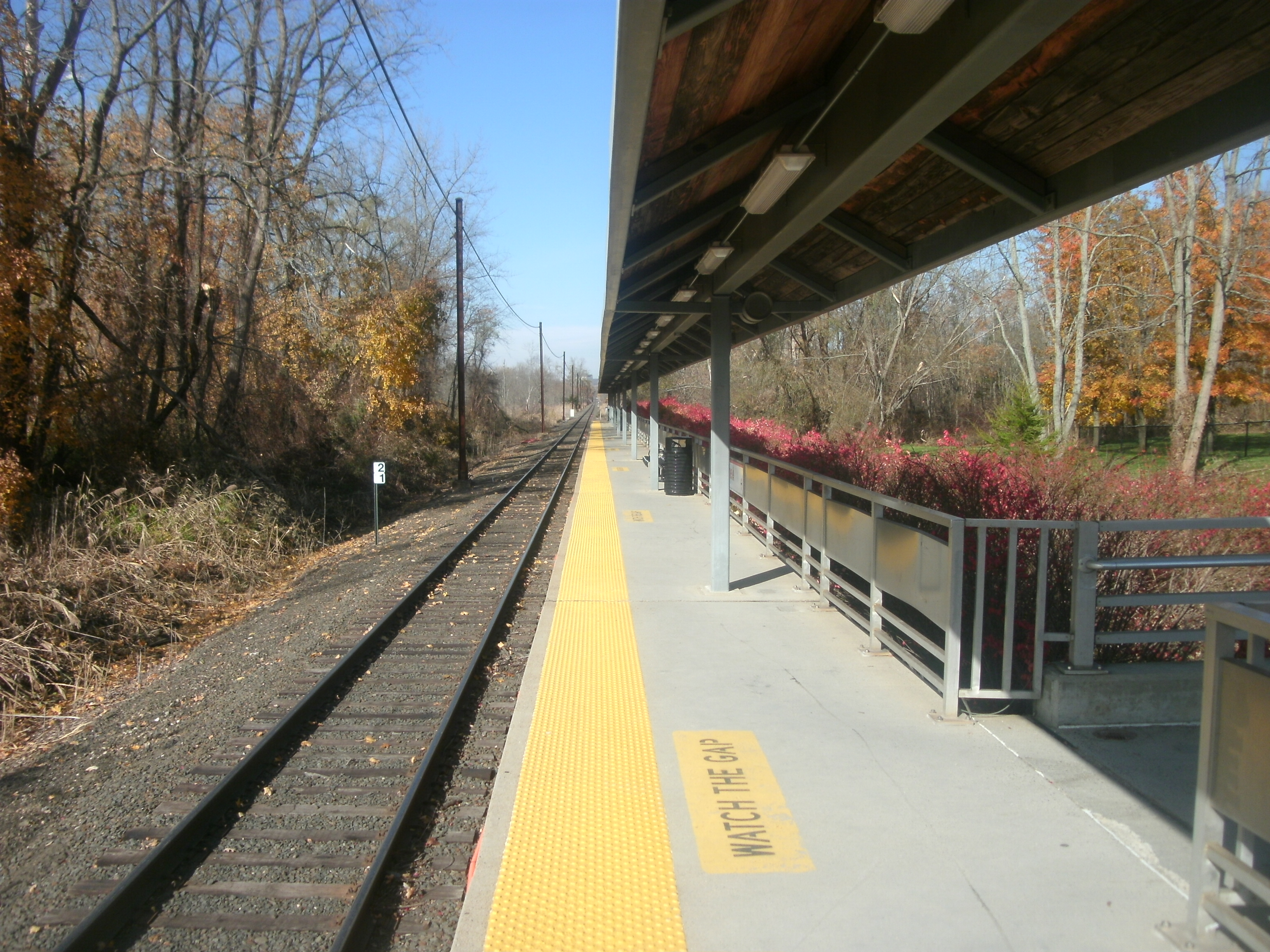
Bethel station, November 2011. The station is part of Metro-North Railroad's Danbury Branch.

Interstate 84 passes through Bethel, and it has a train station on the Danbury Branch of Metro-North's New Haven Line. The Danbury Branch provides commuter rail service between Danbury, to South Norwalk, Stamford, and Grand Central Terminal in New York City. Housatonic Area Regional Transit provides local bus service.

== Notable people ==
- Raghib Allie-Brennan, member of the Connecticut House of Representatives (raised in Bethel)
- Matt Barnes (born 1990), pitcher for the Washington Nationals
- P. T. Barnum (1810–1891), showman
- Barbara Britton (1919–1980), stage, film and television actress
- Dan Cramer, mixed martial arts fighter for the Ultimate Fighting Championship
- Tony Dovolani, ballroom dancer, cast member on Dancing with the Stars
- Kevin Gutzman, constitutional scholar and professor of history
- Allan J. Kellogg, Medal of Honor recipient
- Jan Miner (1917–2004), actress
- Thurston Moore (born 1958), singer and guitarist for Sonic Youth
- Noël Regney, composer
- Meg Ryan, actress
- Julius Hawley Seelye (1824–1895), missionary, author, congressman, and former president of Amherst College
- Glover Teixeira, Professional MMA fighter
- Annamarie Tendler (born 1985), artist
- Henry Arthur "Art" Young (1866–1943), cartoonist
