= Redding station (Metro-North) =

Metro-North Railroad station in Connecticut

Redding
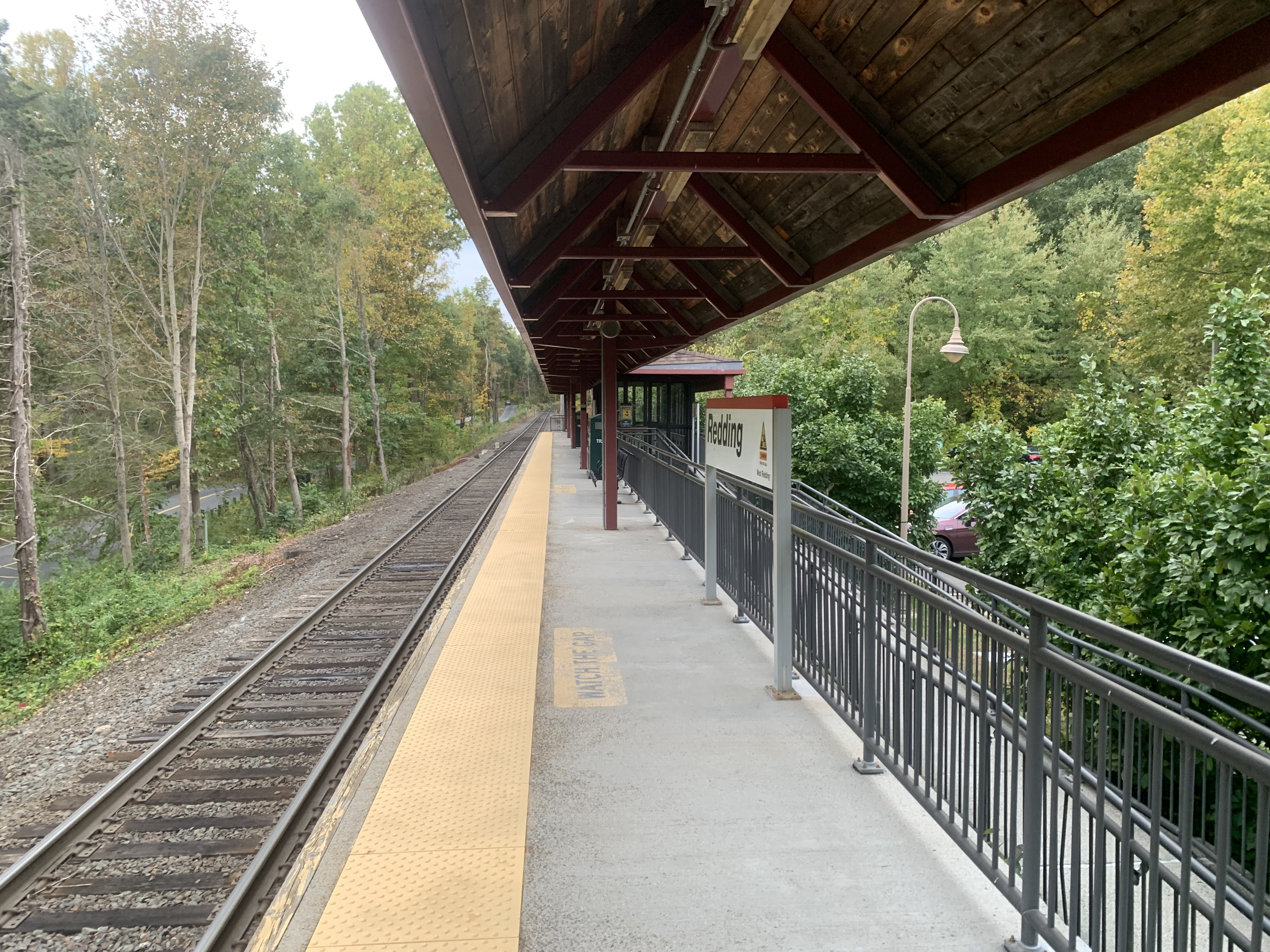
- Redding station in October 2024

General information
- Location: 3 Long Ridge Road; Redding, Connecticut
- Coordinates: 41.3256°N 73.4335°W
- Owner: Connecticut Department of Transportation
- Operator: Town of Redding
- Platforms: 1 side platform
- Tracks: 1

Construction
- Parking: 82 spaces
- Accessible: yes

Other information
- Fare zone: 42

Passengers
- 2018: 48 daily boardings

Services
Preceding station	Metro-North Railroad	Following station
Branchville toward South Norwalk, Stamford or Grand Central	Danbury Branch	Bethel toward Danbury
Former services
Preceding station	New York, New Haven and Hartford Railroad	Following station
Branchville toward Norwalk and South Norwalk	Pittsfield Branch	Bethel toward Pittsfield
Location

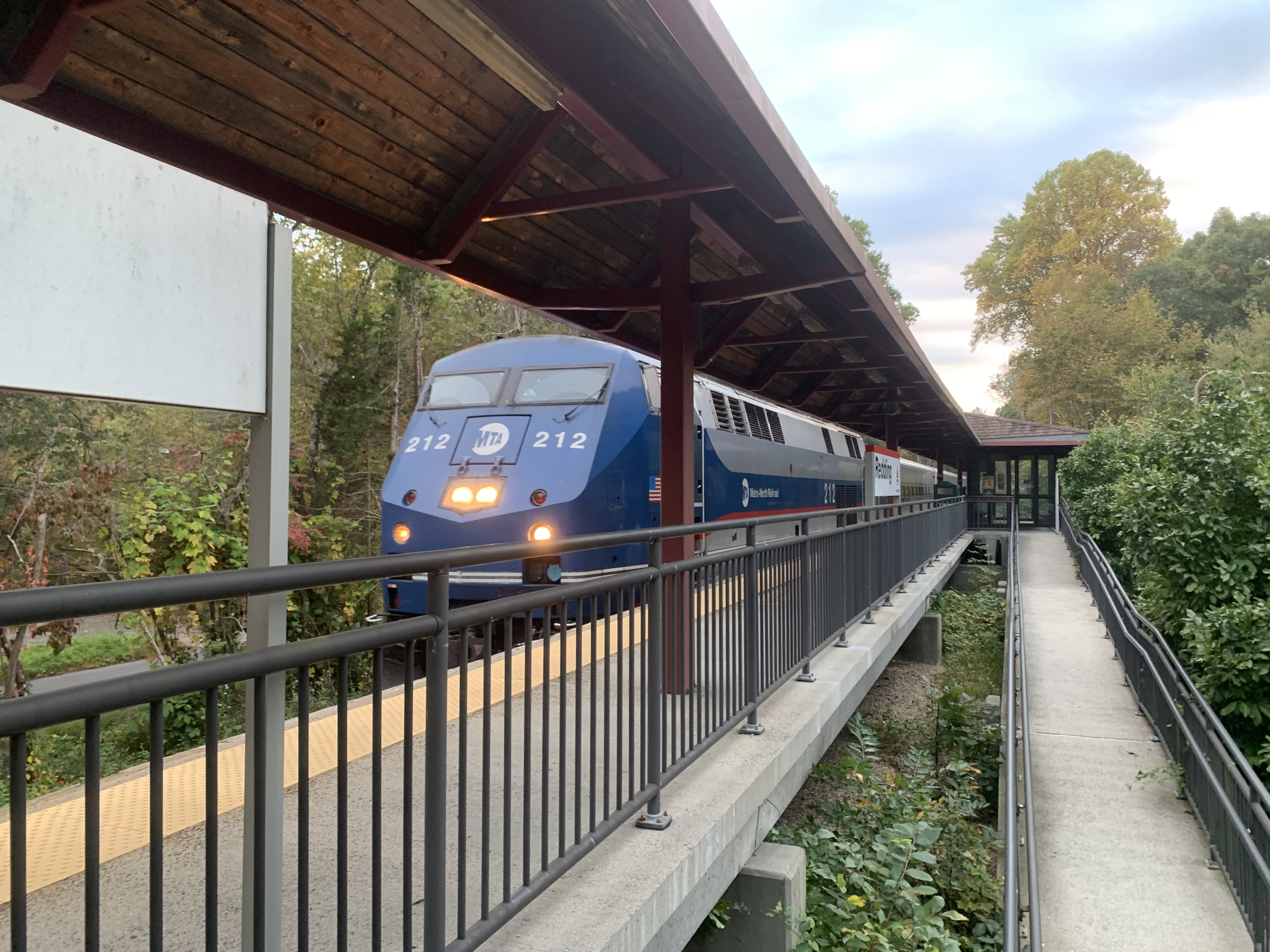
A Metro-North train arriving at Redding

Redding station (also known as West Redding) is a commuter rail stop on the Danbury Branch of the Metro-North Railroad New Haven Line, located in Redding, Connecticut. The station has one two-car-long high-level side platform to the west of the single track.

== History ==
Redding station first opened as an original station on the Danbury and Norwalk Railroad in 1852. It was located on the west side of the track. A new structure serving as station, general store, and post office was later constructed on the east side of the tracks. It was replaced with a smaller concrete shelter slightly to the south in 1952; the older station remains standing and is used by local businesses. In 1999, Metro-North constructed a high-level platform and parking lot south of Long Ridge Road on the west side of the tracks.
