= Grange Hall (Wilton, Connecticut) =

- U.S. Historic district – Contributing property
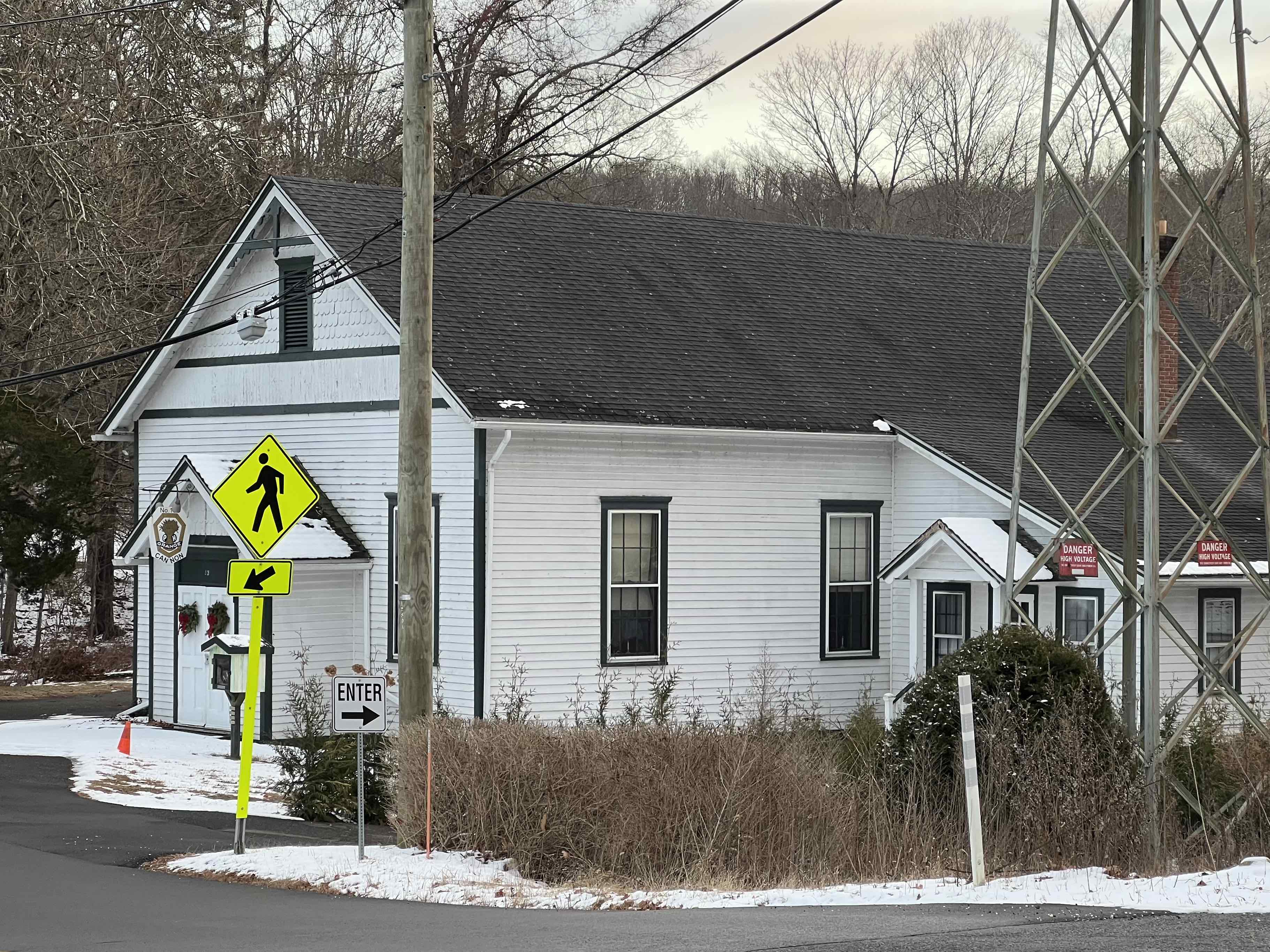

- Location within Connecticut Location within the United States
- Location: 25 Cannon Road, Cannondale section of Wilton, Connecticut
- Coordinates: 41.2161°N 73.4263°W
- Built: 1899
- Part of: Cannondale Historic District (ID92001531)
- Designated CP: November 12, 1992

The Grange Hall in the Cannondale section of the town of Wilton, Connecticut is a historic Grange building, and is home of the Cannon Grange.

The building was built in 1899 as a community center. It was acquired by the Grange organization in 1933.

The building is a contributing property in the Cannondale Historic District, which is listed on the National Register of Historic Places. It is a Victorian, 1½-story structure with a "gable roof, clapboard with scalloped shingles in gable ends, stickwork peak ornament".
