= Rev. John Ely House =

Historic house in Connecticut, United States

- U.S. National Register of Historic Places
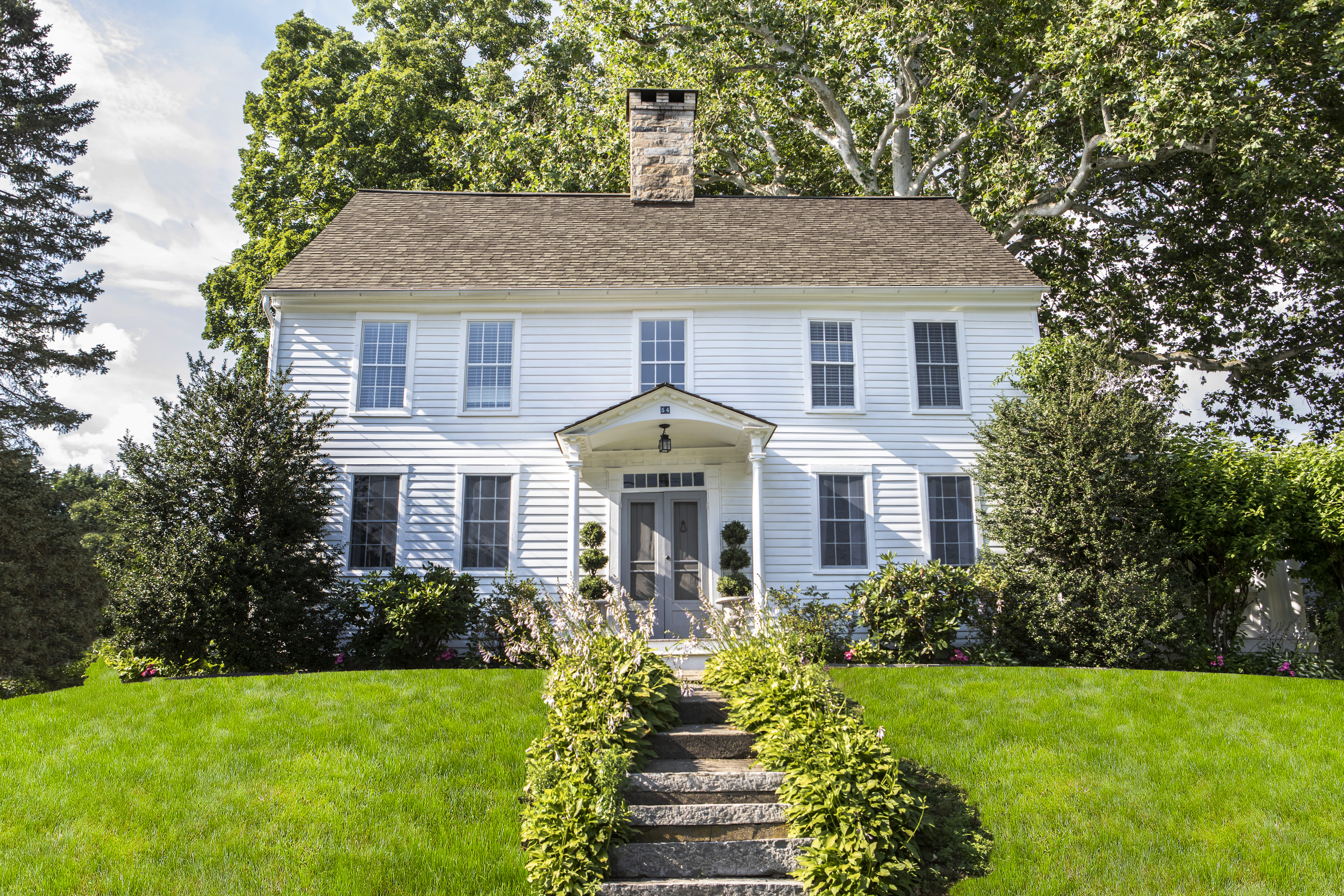

- Location within Connecticut Location within the United States
- Location: 54 Milwaukee Avenue, Bethel, Connecticut
- Coordinates: 41°22′30″N 73°24′13″W
- Area: 0.8 acres (0.32 ha)
- Built: 1792
- Architectural style: Colonial
- NRHP reference No.: 01000400
- Added to NRHP: April 25, 2001

The Rev. John Ely House is a historic house at 54 Milwaukee Avenue in Bethel, Connecticut. Built in 1792, it is well-preserved example of period domestic architecture, and is further notable for a procession of owners important in the community's history. The house was listed on the National Register of Historic Places in 2001.

== Description and history ==
The Ely House is located east of the village center of Bethel, at the northeast corner of Milwaukee Avenue and Kayview Avenue. It is a 2 1/2-story wood-frame structure, five bays wide, with a large central chimney, a side-gable roof, and a stone foundation. Its main entrance is centered on the front facade, and is sheltered by a Federal-style portico supported by slender columns, with a decorated soffit. The interior follows a typical center chimney plan, with parlors on either side of the chimney, a narrow entry vestibule with winding staircase in front, and the original kitchen space behind. Two small chambers once occupied the rear corners of the building; these have been integrated into other rooms. The house has retained significant amounts of original 18th-century woodwork, including wide board floors on the second floor, raised panel doors on the first floor, and board-and-batten doors on the second. The entry vestibule and staircase retain most of their original carved woodwork.

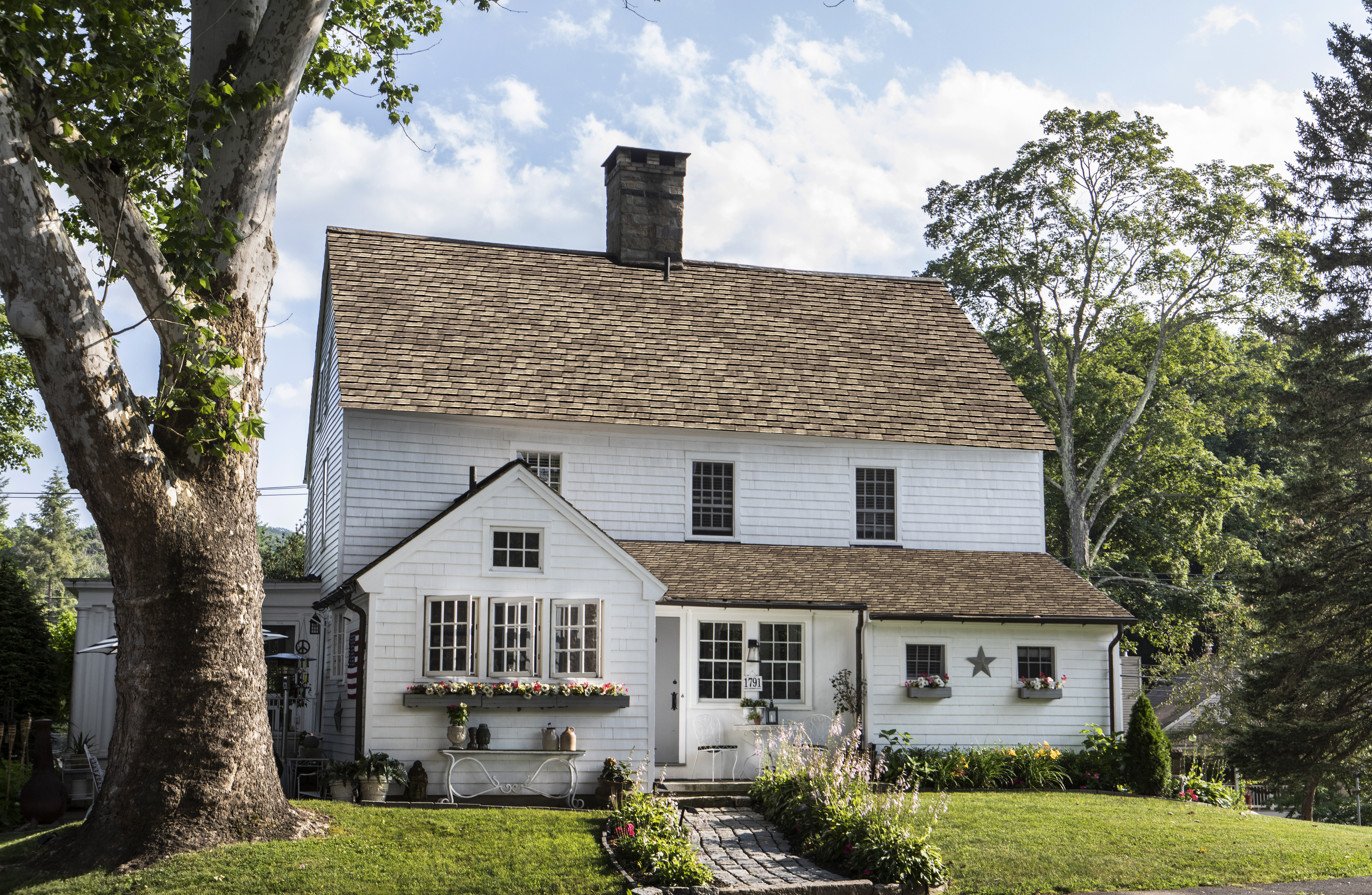
Rear View of John Ely House

The house was built c. 1792, and is a well-preserved local survivor of the period. It is also noted for a succession of residents who played significant roles in the growth of Bethel during the 19th century, including two ministers and three businessmen, the latter including Oliver Shepard, a figure instrumental in the separation of Bethel as a separate town in 1855. Reverend John Ely, for whom the house was built, was Bethel parish's second settled minister, at a time when it was still part of Danbury.

The barn on the property has been modernized and utilized as a studio for performing arts and photography/videography.

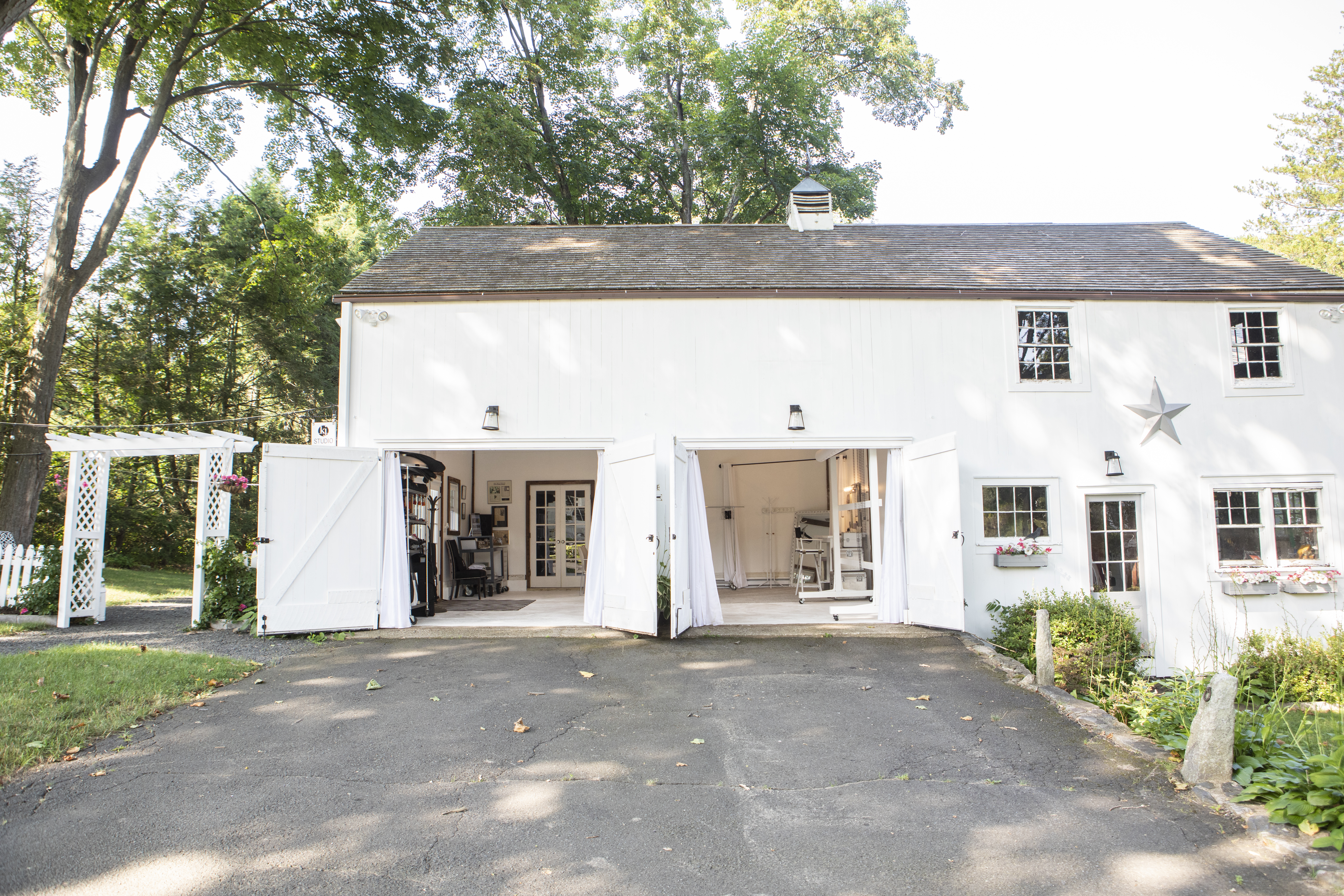
Front of Studio at Rev. John Ely House

== See also ==
- National Register of Historic Places listings in Fairfield County, Connecticut
