= Branchville station =

Metro-North Railroad station in Connecticut

Branchville
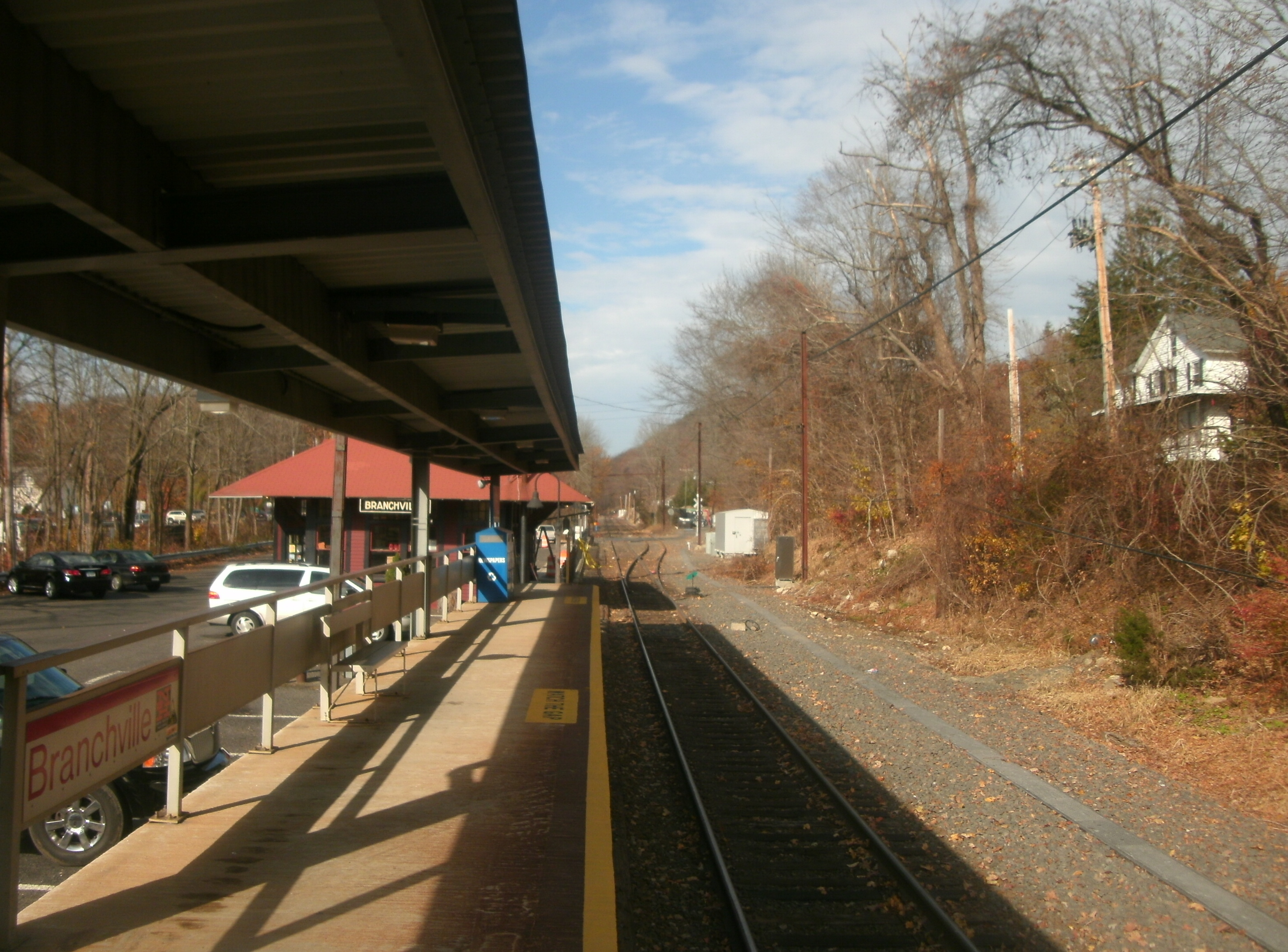
- Branchville station in November 2011

General information
- Location: 787 Branchville Road; Ridgefield, Connecticut
- Coordinates: 41.2667°N 73.4409°W
- Owner: Connecticut Department of Transportation
- Operator: Town of Ridgefield
- Platforms: 1 side platform
- Tracks: 1
- Connections: Norwalk Transit District: Route 7 Link

Construction
- Parking: 168 spaces
- Accessible: yes

Other information
- Fare zone: 42

Passengers
- 2018: 123 daily boardings

Services
| Preceding station | Metro-North Railroad | Following station |
|---|---|---|
| Cannondale toward South Norwalk, Stamford or Grand Central | Danbury Branch | Redding toward Danbury |
Former services
| Preceding station | New York, New Haven and Hartford Railroad | Following station |
|---|---|---|
| Georgetown toward Norwalk and South Norwalk | Pittsfield Branch | Redding toward Pittsfield |
Location

Branchville station is a commuter rail station on the Danbury Branch of the Metro-North Railroad New Haven Line, located in the Branchville neighborhood of Ridgefield, Connecticut.

== History ==
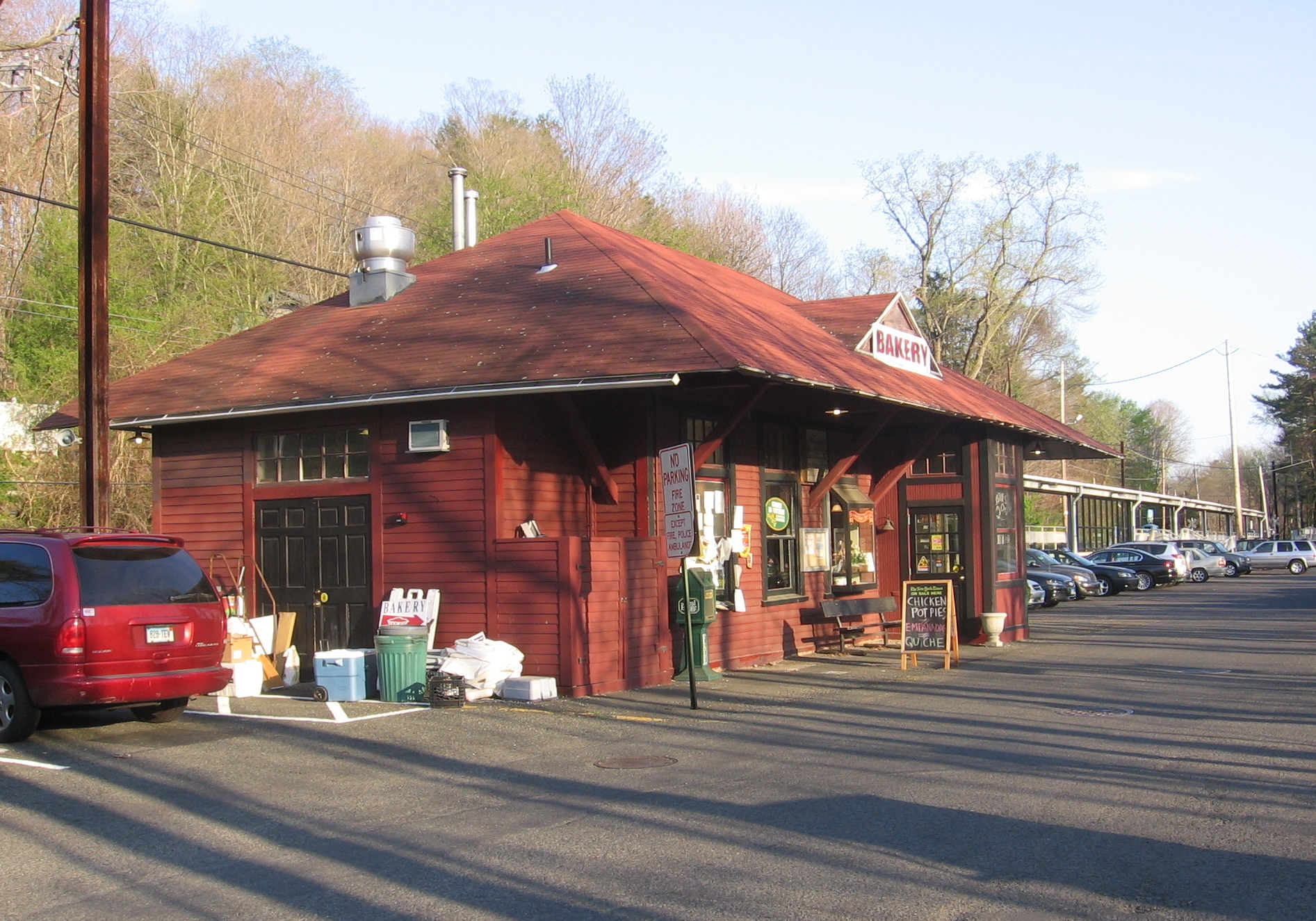
The current station building in 2012

Ridgefield opened in 1852 as an original station on the Danbury and Norwalk Railroad. The name was changed to Branchville upon the 1870 opening of the Ridgefield Branch. A new station building was built around 1887 and served until the current station house was built in 1905. The building is currently occupied by the Whistle Stop Bakery, which opened in the 1980s. The Ridgefield Branch was used for passenger service until 1925 and for freight service until 1964.

== Station layout ==
The station has one three-car-long high-level side platform to the west of the single track. A 1,500-foot (460 m) passing siding extends north from the station.

The station has 168 parking spaces and two EV charging stations, which are owned by the Connecticut Department of Transportation (ConnDOT) and managed by the town. However, Metro-North is responsible for trash removal.
