= Cannondale Historic District =

Historic district in Connecticut, United States

- U.S. National Register of Historic Places
- U.S. Historic district
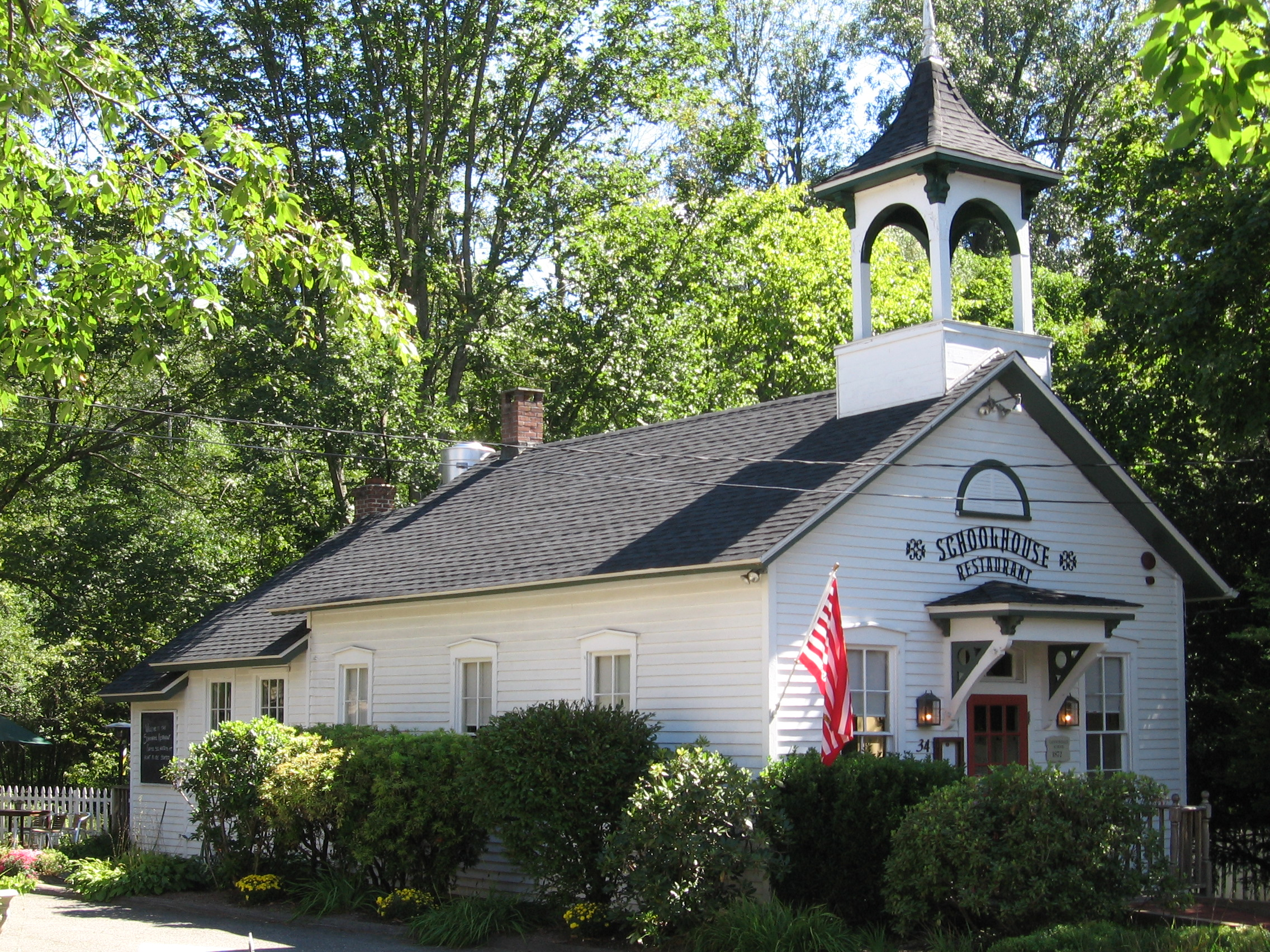
- 1872 Cannondale School building, housing a restaurant

- Location within Connecticut Location within the United States
- Location: Roughly bounded by Cannon, Danbury and Seeley Roads, Wilton, Connecticut
- Coordinates: 41°13′21″N 73°25′34″W
- Area: 202 acres (82 ha)
- Architectural style: Greek Revival, Late Victorian, Colonial
- NRHP reference No.: 92001531
- Added to NRHP: November 12, 1992

Cannondale Historic District is a historic district in the Cannondale section in the north-central area of the town of Wilton, Connecticut. The district includes 58 contributing buildings, one other contributing structure, one contributing site, and 3 contributing objects, over a 202 acres (82 ha). About half of the buildings are along Danbury Road (U.S. Route 7) and most of the rest are close to the Cannondale train station (another half dozen buildings are along Seeley Road).The district is significant because it embodies the distinctive architectural and cultural-landscape characteristics of a small commercial center as well as an agricultural community from the early national period through the early 20th century....The historic uses of the properties in the district include virtually the full array of human activity in this region—farming, residential, religious, educational, community groups (the Grange), small-scale manufacturing, transportation, and even government (the building that housed the first Cannondale Post Office). The close physical relationship among all these uses, as well as the informal character of the commercial enterprises before the rise of more aggressive techniques to attract consumers, capture some of the texture of life as lived by prior generations. The district is also significant for its collection of architecture and for its historic significance.

The district has a number of buildings in Greek Revival style, as well as Victorian era buildings and Colonial Revival buildings.

== Cannon Crossing ==
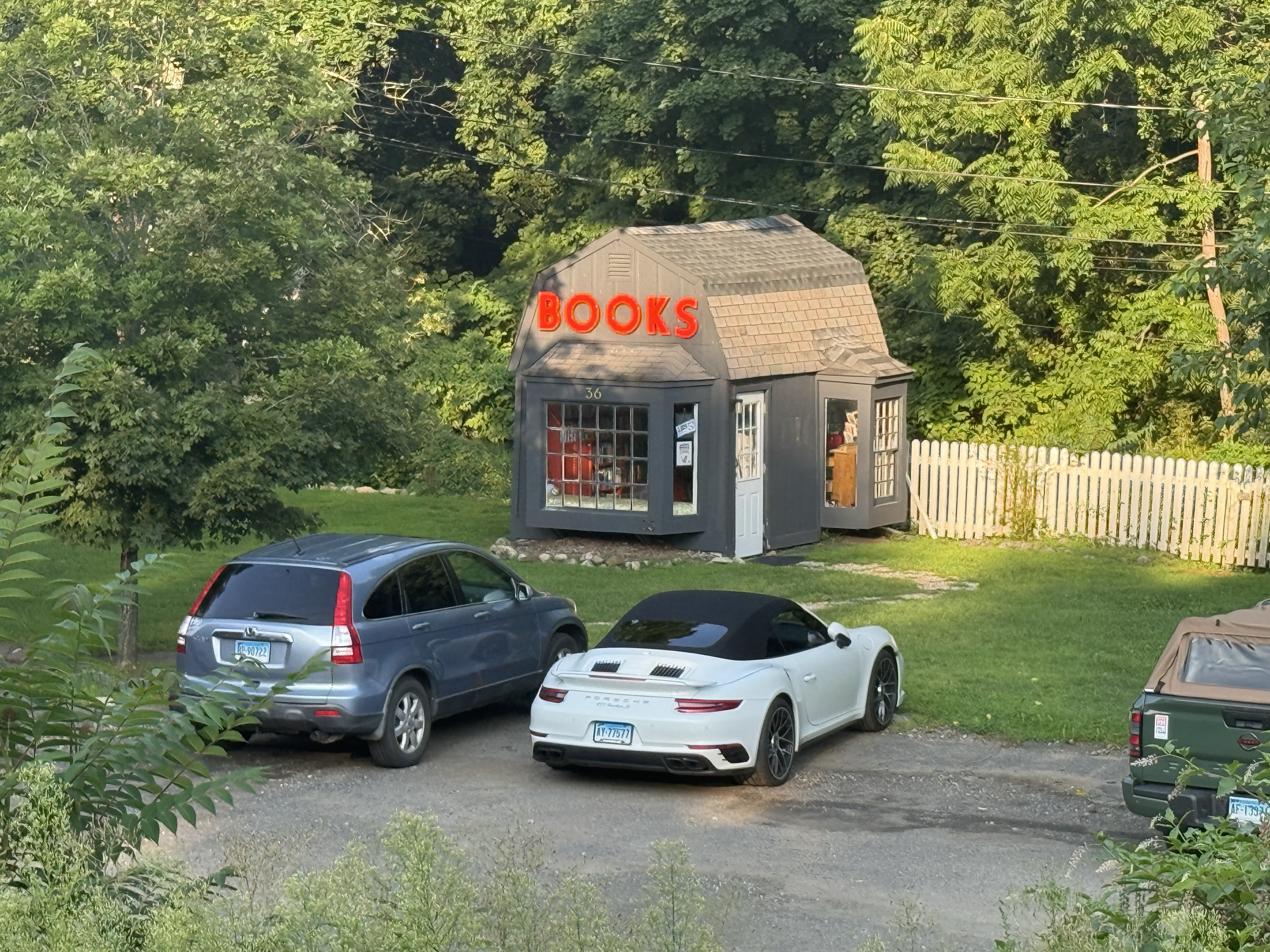
Schmendrick's Bookshop on Cannon Road

Part of the historic district is composed of restored, 19th-century buildings in the 8-acre (32,000 m^{2}) "Cannon Crossing" shopping development on the north side of Cannon Road and across the railroad tracks from the Cannondale train station. The development was created by actress June Havoc, who sold the property in 1989. At least four contributing objects in the historic district are described in the NRHP nomination, including the 1872 Schoolhouse, which Havoc had moved to its present site in the late 1970s (from its original site at the corner of Olmstead Hill and Danbury Roads).

== Significant properties ==
Properties in the district include the following (unless otherwise noted, quotations are from the 1992 registration form filed with the National Register of Historic Places):

=== On Cannon Road ===
- Nelson S. Hurlbutt House - 1922 - 8 Cannon Road - a 2½-story, Colonial Revival gambrel-roofed house with wood shingles, a three-bay facade and Tuscan-columned portico framing its central entry
- Godfrey Academy - 1849 - 20 Cannon Road - moved in 1961 to its present location from Danbury Road.

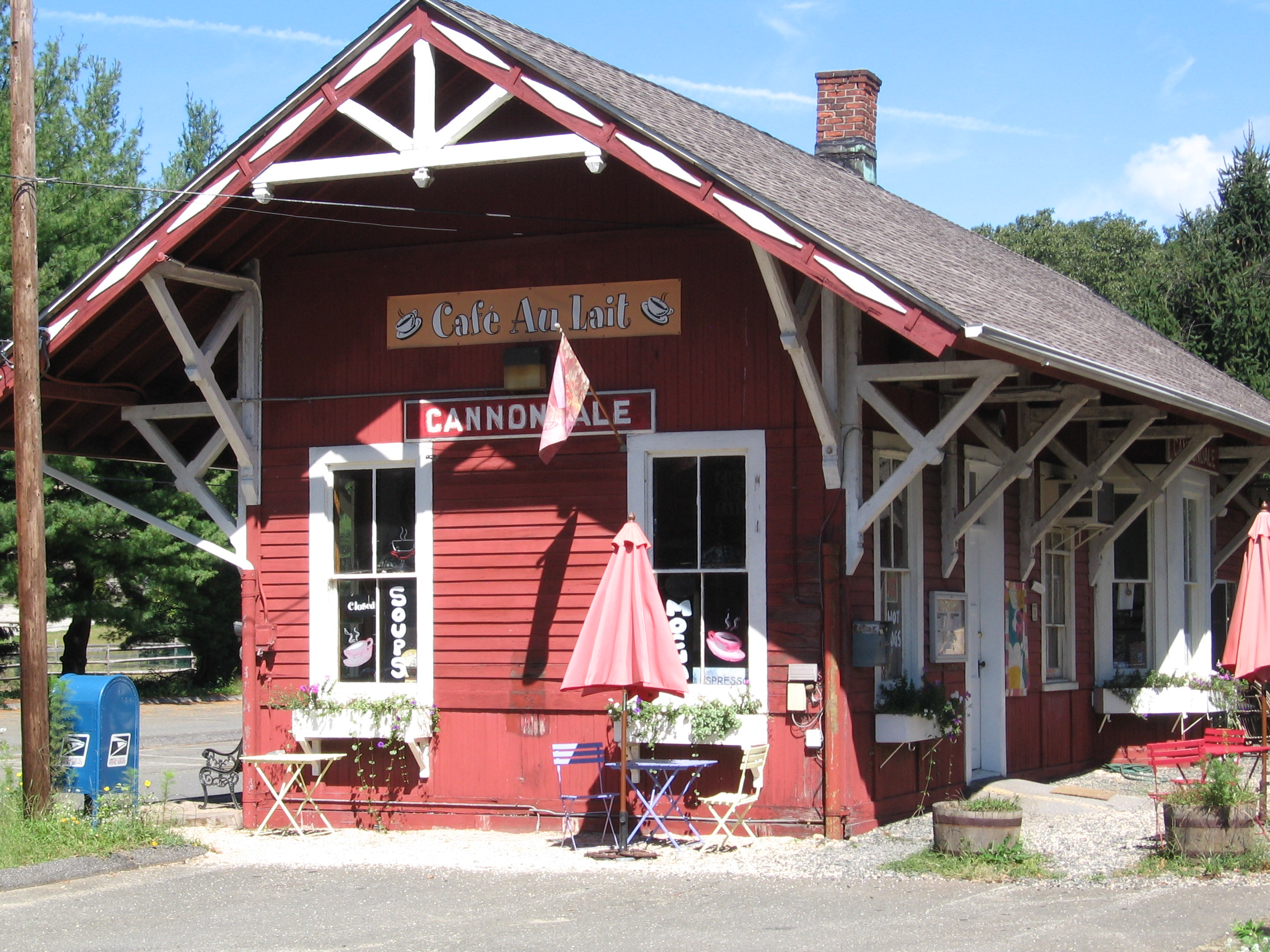
Cannondale Railroad Station

- Cannondale Station - 1892 - 22 Cannon Road - Victorian-era, one-story structure with a gable roof and wide, overhanging eaves supported by chamfered brackets and bargeboard with a geometric motif and a stickwork peak ornament.
- Charles Gregory Store and Post Office - c. 1850 - 24 Cannon Road - 2½ stories, with a gable roof, clapboard, a "plain frieze and molded cornice with partial return", a rear wing added about 1895
  - A small, two-story, clapboard house behind Charles Gregory Store, built about 1900, with a gable roof.
- Cannon Grange Hall - 1899 - 25 Cannon Road - Victorian, 1½-story structure with a "gable roof, clapboard with scalloped shingles in gable ends, stickwork peak ornament".

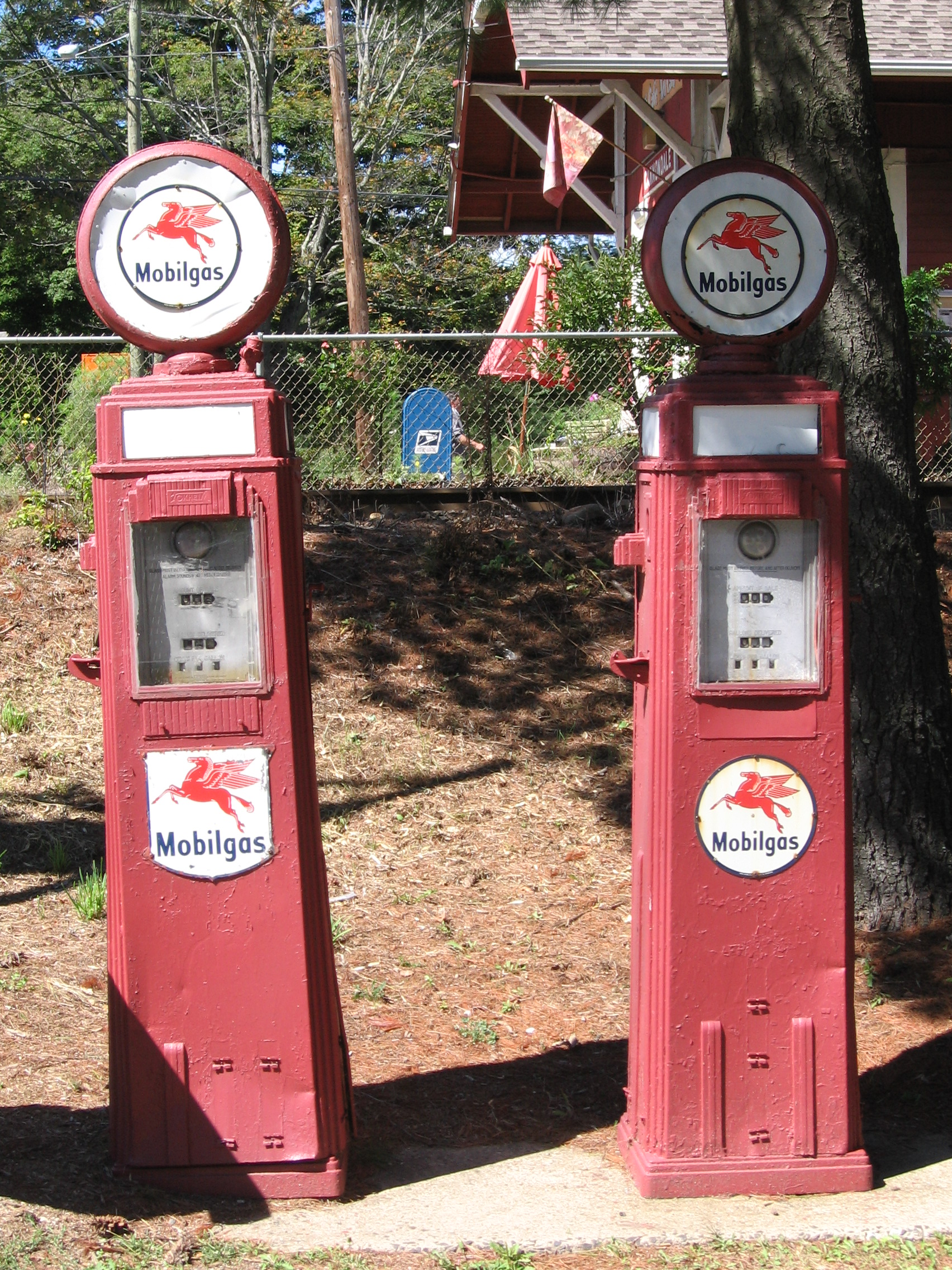
Antique "Mobilgas" pumps, manufactured by Tokheim

- Charles Gregory Dam - 30 Cannon Road - c. 1910 - "coursed rubble spillway and abutments; wheel-pit with draft tube for turbine-based power system incorporated into west abutment. Atop west abutment is former Charles Gregory gristmill that was extensively remodeled in the late 1920s and late 1970s."
- Three contributing objects located at entrance to Cannon Crossing shopping area at 30 Cannon Road:
  - a "c.1900 turbine that was removed from Gregory Grist Mill wheelpit"
  - "two c. 1925 reservoir-head gasoline pumps"
- Gregory Gristmill Tenant House - c. 1900 - 32 Cannon Road - two stories, with a "gable roof, clapboard with shingled gable ends".
- B. F. Brown Boarding School - 1857 - 33 Cannon Road - Greek Revival entry, three stories, "gable roof, clapboard, high brick basement with brownstone window lintels, pilaster-and-lintel entry with sidelights and transom"
  - A barn behind the B. F. Brown Boarding School
- Cannondale School - 1872 - 34 Cannon Road - one-story, "gable roof, clapboard, hip-roofed entry shelter on large brackets, pedimented window surrounds, ogee-roofed cupola with round-arched openings"; the building was moved to its present location in 1979 from the corner of Olmstead Hill and Danbury roads.
- Helen Godfrey House - c. 1900 - 37 Cannon Road - Victorian era, 2½-story house with a "gable roof, wood shingle; porch (turned posts jigsawn brackets, molded rail on turned balusters) wraps around right side to meet 2-story cross-gabled ell".
- Lockwood Academy - 1851 - 43 Cannon Road, also known as 42 Cannon Road - Built in a "vernacular" style "with greek Revival influence, 2½ stories, gable roof, clapboard, pilaster-and-linetl entry, simple steeped entablature with partial return"
  - Barn to the rear of the Lockwood Academy building
- Marjorie W. Hands House - 1939 - 63 Cannon Road - Southern Colonial Revival - 2½ stories, "gable roof, clapboard with flush-boarded facade, central chimney, two-story inset gallery with plain square posts"
- Cottage - c. 1940 - 68 Cannon Road - 1½ stories, gable roof, wood shingles
- Jesse Gregory House - c. 1800 - 109 Cannon Road - Federal/Colonial Revival with 20th-century additions and alterations, 2½ stories, gable roof, clapboard, "original portion is 5-bay, central-hall plan with remnants of pilaster-and-lintel entry treatment; Tuscan-columned porches, windows and surrounds, entablature, and extensions to either side represent 20th-century alterations".

=== On Danbury Road ===
- David Henry Miller III House - 1907 - 426 Danbury Road - 2½ stories, hip roof, clapboard, "Tuscan-columned porch wraps around both sides and on south side meets porte-cochere with shallow pediments, hip-roofed dormers"
  - Barn to rear of David Henry Miller III House
- Hiram and Mary Cannon Jones House - c.1835 - 436 Danbury Road - Greek Revival, 2½ stories, gable roof, clapboard, "Ionic portico with full entablature, pilaster-and-lintel entry with leaded sidelights and transom, addition to right rear sheltered by owpen porch with Doric columns".
  - Barn to rear of Hiram and Mary Cannon Jones House
- Samuel Marvin House - c. 1810 - 444 Danbury Road - Federal style, 2½ stories, gable roof, wood shingles, "3-bay, four-room plan with interior chimney, pilaster-and-lintel entry with sidelights and transom, oval gable-end windows with radial muntins; 2-story kitchen wing (1899) and recent rear addition."
  - Barn to rear of Samuel Marvin House
- George Godfrey House - c. 1848/c. 1870 - 454 Danbury Road - gable roof, clapboard; "original part now right-side ell, with 3-bay facade and simple pilaster-and-lintel entry; later portion is 2-bay; open porch with chamfered posts added when house was expanded".
- John Hurlbutt House - c. 1840 - 462 Danbury Road - Greek Revival, 2½ stories, gable roof, clapboard, "pilaster-and-lintel entry, reeded corner boards, pedimented gable-end with flush-boarding; c. 1900 additions to right and rear, recent wing to left".
- Zion Hill Methodist Episcopal Church - 1844 - 470 Danbury Road - Greek Revival, single, high story, "pilastered facade with recessed entry, pilaster-and-lintel entry treatment, pilastered belfry topped by smaller stage with squat corner towers; Fellowship Hall, to southeast, is noncontributing".
- Zion Hill Cemetery adjacent, c.1840, a cemetery "arranged as parallel rows of east-facing burials; predominantly mid-19th-century white-marble markers"
- Lewis Hurlbutt House - 1909 - 475 Danbury Road - Colonial Revival-style, 2½-story house with a gable roof, wood shingles, "wraparound porch with fluted Doric columns, Palladian window in front gable end, gable-roofed dormers"
  - A carriage barn behind the Lewis Hurlbutt House also contributed to the case for historic registration
- Noah Partrick House - 1837 - 481 Danbury Road - 2½ stories, gable roof, clapboard sides, "3-bay facade with central entry, simply molded cornice with partial return, recent 1-story wing".
- Charles Scribner House, c.1830 Greek Revival house with c.1910 Colonial Revival porch with Tuscan columns.
- "center-chimney house" - c. 1795 - two stories, gable roof, clapboard siding, "3-bay facade with plain entry, flush eaves, small shed addition to rear".
- William Nichols House - c. 1800/c. 1840 - 493 Danbury Road - Greek Revival, 2½ story, gable-roofed, clapboard-sided house, "originally center-chimney dwelling reworked in Greek Revival Style c. 1840 by addition of corner pilasters, entablature, pedimented gable ends, and pilaster-and-lintel entry with sidelights and transom"
  - The barn on the property of the William Nichols House also contributed to the case for registering the historical district.
- Thaddeus Quick House - c. 1845 - 496 Danbury Road - Greek Revival house with late-19th-century alterations, 2½ stories, gable roof, clapboard sides; "original features include paneled corner pilasters, entablature with partial return, and pilaster-and-lintel entry with sidelights; Victorian features include 1-story bay windows on front and side; entry shelter with faux Doric columns probably Colonial Revival feature".
  - The barn just to the north of the Thaddeus Quick House also contributed to the case for registering the historical district.
- George Nichols House - c. 1840/c. 1870 - 503 Danbury Road - 2½ stories, gable roof, vinyl siding; "original portion is 5-bay with center entry, with cross-bable wing added c. 1870; also added at that time were porch with square chamfered posts and round-arched attic lights; new chimney; garage is noncontributing".
- Azor Belden House - c. 1788 - 539 Danbury Road - An older origin for this building is asserted by local historian Robert H. Russell, who wrote that in 1727, William Belden, then 56 years old, and his large family moved to Wilton from Deerfield, Massachusetts and bought this house from Obadiah Wood. The house was later greatly expanded and modified, according to Russell, into the "stately home".

=== On Olmstead Hill Road ===
- Gersham and Mary Ann Partrick House - c. 1875 - Victorian Vernacular-style, two-story, gable-roofed, clapboard-sided house; "original (front) portion is simple two-bay dwelling with full porch featuring heavy turned posts and small pediment over entry bay; cross-gable addition to rear left, and shed addition to rear."
  - The barn on the property of the Gersham and Mary Ann Partrick House also contributed to the historic-preservation registration.
- Charles Gregory Gristmill, non-contributing as it was "co[n]verted into residence in late 1920s and extensively remodeled in late 1970s." (see also "Charles Gregory gristmill dam" at 30 Cannon Road, above)

=== On Seeley Road ===
- vernacular house - 25 Seeley Road - c. 1920 - 1½ stories, wood shingle

- Polly and William Wakeman House - c. 1840/1907+ - 36 Seeley Road - Federal/Colonial Revival - 2½ stories, gable roof, clapboard; "nucleus is a 3-bay Federal house that retains its plan, central chimney and details such as gable-end Palladian window; most of the present structure consists of wings added between 1907 and 1940" The barn on the property of the Polly and William Wakeman House also contributed to the historic-preservation registration The Wakemans were among a group of abolitionists in Wilton who helped runaway slaves. Underneath their house was a tunnel that was accessed by a trap door. They took people on late-night trips to neighboring towns on the Underground Railroad.
- Hannah Lounsbury House - c. 1852 - 45 Seeley Road - vernacular/Colonial Revival, 1½ story structure with a gable roof, clapboard siding, "originally plain, 3-bay, central-hall-plan house; 2-bay west wing and Colonial Revival entry treatment added post-1950"
  - The barn on the property is also contributing
- c. 1850/1938 house - 67 Seeley Road -"vernacular/Colonial Revival, 2½ stories, gable roof, clapboard, 3-bay facade modified in 1938 with addition of Colonial Revival entry treatment and two prominent wall dormers; additions to right and rear"
- Hickock House - c. 1810/1915+ - 105 Seeley Road - "vernacular/Colonial Revival, 2½ stories, gable roof, wood shingle; originally 5-bay center-chimney dwelling with molded cornice (partial return); 20th-century wings added to north and west sides; barn is also contributing"

== See also ==
- National Register of Historic Places listings in Fairfield County, Connecticut
- List of Underground Railroad sites
