= Seth Seelye House =

Historic house in Connecticut, United States

- U.S. National Register of Historic Places
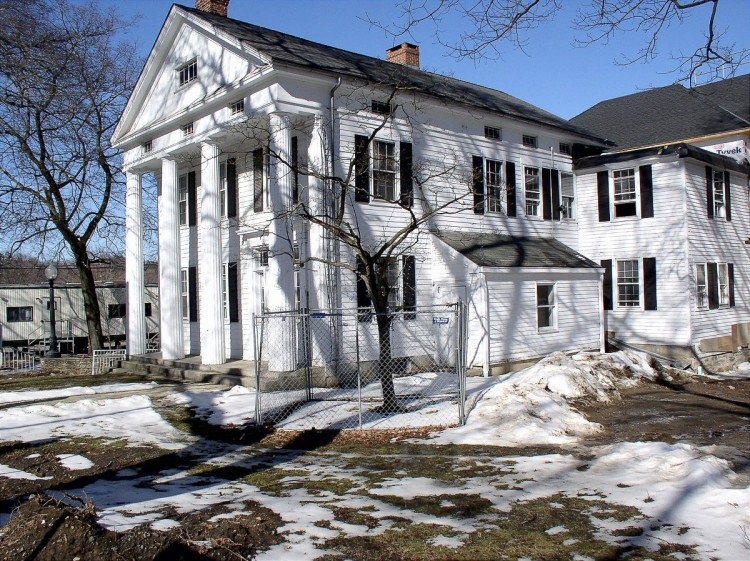

- Location within Connecticut Location within the United States
- Location: 189 Greenwood Avenue, Bethel, Connecticut
- Coordinates: 41°22′16″N 73°24′51″W
- Area: 1 acre (0.40 ha)
- Built: 1842
- Architectural style: Greek Revival
- NRHP reference No.: 77001386
- Added to NRHP: August 29, 1977

The Seth Seelye House, now the Bethel Public Library, is a historic building at 189 Greenwood Avenue in Bethel, Connecticut. Built in 1842, the house is gable-fronted, with four relatively slender Doric style columns in a portico supporting the gable-front pediment above. A modern two-story wing extends the building to the rear. Originally constructed for a member of a prominent Danbury business family before Bethel's separation from Danbury, it remains a local example of Greek Revival architecture in North America.

The building was listed on the National Register of Historic Places in 1977.

== See also ==
- National Register of Historic Places listings in Fairfield County, Connecticut
