= Cannondale, Connecticut =

Census-designated place in Connecticut, United States

Cannondale
- Census-designated place
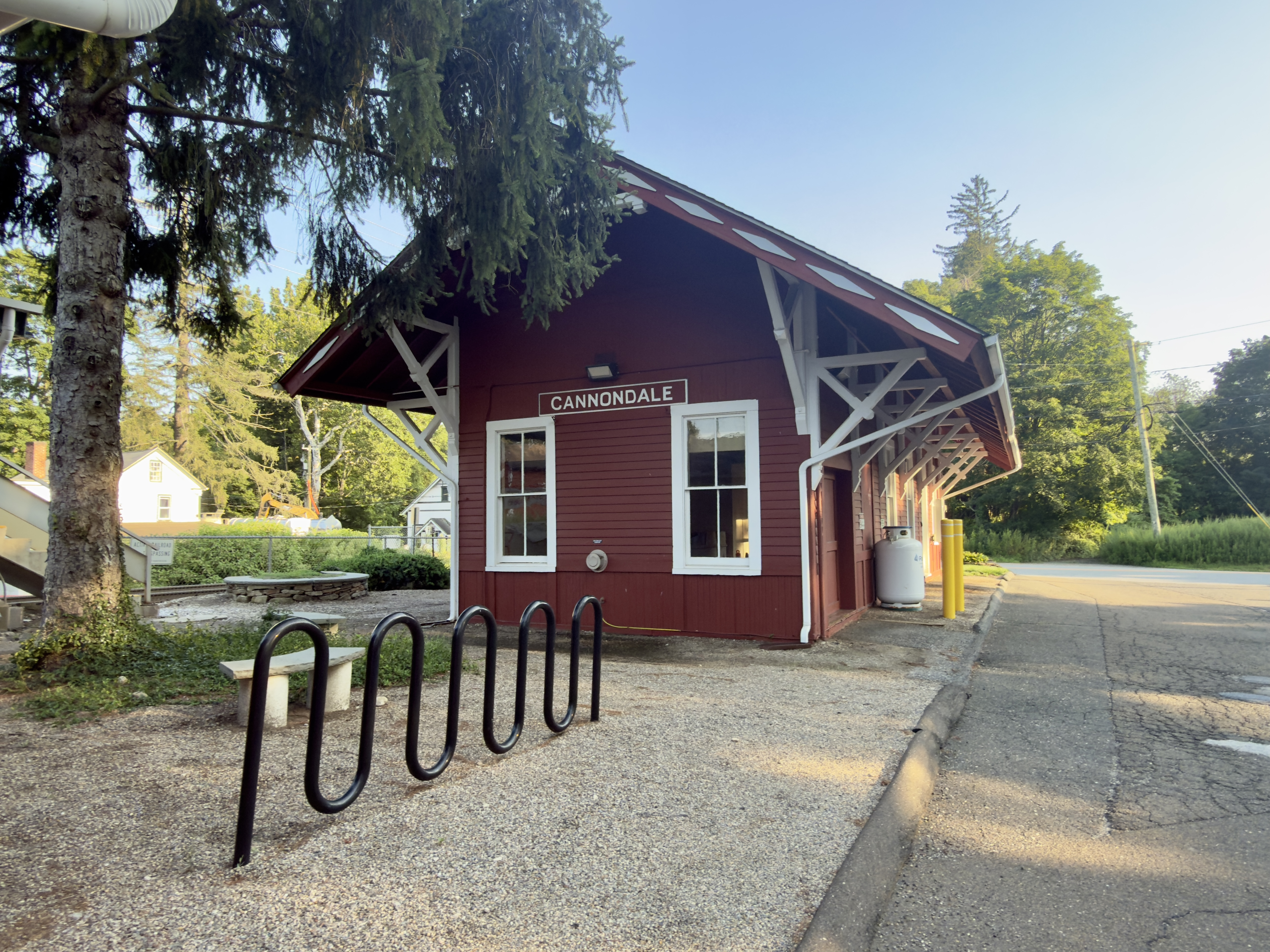
- Cannondale Railroad Station

- Location within Connecticut Location within the United States
- Coordinates: 41°12′59″N 73°25′31″W
- Country: United States
- State: Connecticut
- County: Fairfield
- City: Wilton

Area
  - Total: 0.31 sq mi (0.80 km^{2})
  - Land: 0.31 sq mi (0.80 km^{2})
  - Water: 0 sq mi (0.00 km^{2})

Population (2010)
  - Total: 141
  - Density: 460/sq mi (180/km^{2})
- Time zone: UTC-5:00 (Eastern)
  - Summer (DST): UTC-4:00 (Eastern)
- Area codes: 203/475
- FIPS code: 09-11990
- GNIS feature ID: 2631221

Cannondale is a census-designated place (CDP) within the town of Wilton in Fairfield County, Connecticut, United States. As of the 2020 census, Cannondale had a population of 396. The neighborhood consists of many old homes on large, almost rural lots now largely wooded. The English first settled the land in the 17th century. At the center of Cannondale is Cannon Crossing, a small shopping village of boutiques and restaurants made up of 19th-century buildings restored by actress June Havoc in the late 1970s on the east side of Cannondale Railroad Station. Both are part of Cannondale Historic District, which encompasses the central part of Cannondale and most of its significant historical buildings.

The area was originally called "Pimpewaug" by the local Indians, and it was the name originally used by the colonial settlers. The Cannon family became prominent in the area, in part because of the Cannon Store, which started operating in the 1790s. In March 1852, the Danbury and Norwalk Railroad opened a station in the neighborhood, near where the tracks crossed Cannon Road, and named it Cannon Station. Soon after, Charles Cannon began a campaign to get a post office in the neighborhood, and on April 29, 1870, it became a reality in a store east of the railroad tracks (very probably in a building which also functioned as a general store and the train station). At this time, the neighborhood became known as "Cannon Station". In 1882, the U.S. Post Office changed the local office's name to "Cannon", then changed it back to Cannon Station in 1896. The similarity of "Cannon" and "Canaan", a town on the northern border of the state, caused residents to want a further adjustment in the name. In November 1915 the post office name was changed to Cannondale. The post office was closed in 1967 but the name remains, generally covering an area centered on the intersection of Danbury Road and Cannon Road.

In 1915, Samuel Miller, who was instrumental in the final name change, acquired a cannon which had been used in the Civil War battle of Galveston. It was placed at the intersection of Danbury and Cannon roads and toppled twice, once as a Halloween prank and another time in an automobile accident.

== Geography and soil ==
Cannondale is in the east-central part of Wilton, just north of Wilton Center (Wilton's downtown area). Route 7, the Norwalk River and the train tracks (now the Danbury Line of Metro-North Railroad) all run close to each other from south-southwest to north-northeast through the neighborhood. At its widest, the neighborhood stretches 2.1 miles (3.4 km) from east to west and 2.8 miles (4.5 km) from north to south. The Norwalk River valley is 250 feet (76 m) above sea level in the north of Cannondale and descends to 200 feet (61 m) above sea level at the southern end of the neighborhood. Turner Ridge, the western border of Cannondale, rises as high as 500 feet (150 m), but the ridges east of the river are 350 to 450 feet (110 to 140 m) high. At the far eastern side of the neighborhood are the Saugatuck River and Wilton's border with the town of Weston. According to the United States Census Bureau, Cannondale has a total area of 0.309 square miles (0.80 km^{2}), all land.

According to Cannondale: A Connecticut Neighborhood (hereafter referred to as "CACN"), published by the Wilton Historical Society, "The soil that graces Cannondale [...] remains, arguably, the best in the state", with dark brown, sometimes red-tinted, surface soil of a type that extends from New Milford in the north down to the shore of Long Island Sound and named "Wilton Loam".

== Public open space ==
In the northeast area of Cannondale is the Gregg Preserve, the Belknap preserve and the Honey Hill Preserve.

The Belknap Preserve is a 27-acre (110,000 m^{2}) tract with an entrance on Wampum Hill Road, 200 feet (61 m) south of its intersection with Honey Hill Road. The preserve has the Loop Trail (1.5 miles long), Cut-Across Trail (0.25 miles) and access trails (0.6 miles). The preserve was bought by the town government from the Belknap family in 1999. The preserve has woodland, open pastures, wetlands, and Mayapple Brook valley. The trails cross several old fields in different stages of reforestation. Stone walls mark off the property lines and many run across the tract. At the southwest corner of the preserve, a trail connects to the Gregg Preserve.

The entrance to the 74.5-acre (301,000 m^{2}) Gregg Preserve is located at the cul-de-sac of Mayapple Road. One trail follows the perimeter of the property, with interior trails crossing it. Horseback riding is allowed if permission is granted by the Wilton Land Conservation Trust, which owns the property. The Connecticut chapter of The Nature Conservancy transferred ownership of the property to the Wilton Land Conservation Trust starting in 1979. Most of the land in the preserve consists of mostly open deciduous woods, with some stands of planted evergreens and some open fields. Honey Hill Road forms part of the northern boundary of the preserve, which is east of the Danbury Line railroad tracks and east of Seeley Road (which forms part of the border at the southern end of the tract). A pond just east of the railroad tracks is not part of the preserve.

The Honey Hill Nature Preserve consists of about 37.5 acres (152,000 m^{2}), most of it in Weston, and is entered from Wampum Hill Road. No parking area is provided, but visitors may park on Wampum Hill Road south of its intersection with Honey Hill Road. The preserve is owned by the Aspetuck Land Trust, which established it in 1968. In 1974 and 1978 the original 21 acres (85,000 m^{2}) was expanded. The parcel occupies the northern end of an oval hill, the crest of which is parallel to the north-south Wilton/Weston town line.

== Transportation ==
The Cannondale station is part of the Danbury Line of Metro-North railroad.

== History ==
=== To the late 18th century ===
The Algongian name for the area was spelled in various ways by early colonists, with "Pimpewaug" being one common spelling. The area known as Pimpewaug covered a somewhat larger area than present Cannondale – from Honey Hill and the Split Rock in the north to the site of the present Wilton railroad station, and west from Drum Hill to Buckingham Ridge in the east.

Many Native American arrowheads have been found in Cannondale's level meadows, and a large flat rock on the east side of the railroad tracks, south of Honey Hill Road, was purportedly a "Dancing Rock" of local Indians. By the 1720s there were no dangerous Indians in the area around Wilton, but there are reports of individual Indians in or close to Cannondale coexisting with English settlers in the early 18th century. According to one report, an Indian lived in a wigwam near the present intersection of School Road and Danbury Road, at the edge of Cannondale or just to the southwest of it. According to Captain Daniel Hurlbutt Jr. (1740–1827), he was nursed by an Indian woman as an infant near 236 Hurlbutt Street (at the southern end of Cannondale or just beyond it), until his father, fearing the woman's milk might be a negative influence on his son, stopped the practice.

The neighborhood, like the rest of Wilton, was originally a part of Norwalk, founded in 1651. By 1726, a separate parish was created for Wilton, allowing area residents to avoid the long trek into Norwalk for Sunday church services (and for men to travel down to Norwalk for militia drilling). Organizationally, the parish was split into a church and an "ecclesiastical society" responsible for secular matters such as levying taxes for support of the church, schools and the militia, as well as for building roads and maintaining them and cemeteries.

Pimpewaug became one of the three original school districts in Wilton, all of which were formed in 1729. The location of the first schoolhouse is not known, but it may have been in the same location as the second schoolhouse, a few hundred yards south of the intersection of Danbury Road and Olmstead Hill Road. That location is just north of present-day Wilton High School and south of Allen's Meadow. Pimpewaug school met in August and September. For the rest of the year, children were employed on their families farms, which were the original and primary industry in the area until well into the 19th century. The Norwalk River supplied power for sawmills and gristmills. By 1809, Cannondale resident Thomas Cole used Norwalk River power for a machine to form wheel hubs for carriages. His brothers, Sherman and Curtis Cole, and nephews later ran the business under the name Cole, Nichols & Company. The plant was probably on the northeast and southeast corners of the intersection of Seeley and Danbury roads, with a sawmill, hub shop, blacksmith shop and a shed for trimming or stripping, where wagons, chaises and sulkies were built. In the late 19th century, the business was replaced at the site by the D&L Lockwood wire mill.

A number of homes from the colonial era survive today in Cannondale. William Belden's home at 5 Scribner Hill Road, built in 1740 near the Split Rock, is one. The building is considered "a splendid example of the region's colonial architecture" and, with its original 2½ stories, four rooms on the main floor and five upstairs, is somewhat larger than was normal for the time. Belden's 60 acres (240,000 m^{2}) of land produced better harvests than that of his neighbors, and in some years they would buy grain from him.

=== Late 18th century to 19th century ===
In 1792, the Wilton Parish School Committee established nine school districts in town, with District 7 corresponding to the present-day Cannondale neighborhood. By 1795, the districts passed from control of the local Congregational society to a new Wilton School Society, independent of ties to a particular religion. Through 1830, Wilton received a state subsidy of $600 from the sale of lands in present-day Ohio, part of a "Fire Lands" settlement the state of Connecticut received to compensate residents for the burning of five towns by the British during the American Revolutionary War. The 1792 boundaries of District 7 were used by mapmakers Beers, Ellis and Soule for their 1867 Atlas of New York and Vicinity to define the section of town they called "Pimpewaug". According to CACN, the boundaries still define the neighborhood.

The influence of the Cannon family, particularly Charles Cannon (1824–1892), his son George (1784–1829) and his grandson, also Charles, was so great that the central area of Pimpewaug became known as "Cannon's" or "Cannon" by the time the railroad line was built through the area and needed a name for the new station.

In the late 1780s, John Cannon (1752–1802) established the Old Red Store, later known as the Cannon Store. The building survives, preserved behind a home on Danbury Road. The exact original location of the store is not known, although many believe it was at the site of a small (100-by-150-foot), oval, man-made pond on the west side of Danbury Road, just south of its intersection with Olmstead Hill Road. The water table, about 6 feet (1.8 m) below ground, is the source of the pond, which has no brooks leading in or out of it, and the digging and establishment of the store building's foundation might have led to the creation of the pond. By 1829, the store was located on the east side of Danbury Road. Although the business did well as late as the 1850s, by 1860 it no longer existed, and Charles Cannon was listed in the U.S. Census as simply a farmer with 60 acres (240,000 m^{2}) of land. Already in the period from 1849 to 1857, however, Cannon had begun other business ventures, including employing area women to sew vests, pants, shirts, coats and overalls. Eighteen Cannondale women, representing about one in four families in the neighborhood, sewed clothing for Cannon's business. They were among 303 women employed that way by Cannon over a seven-year period.

In the early 1850s, Cannon became a subcontractor for the building of the Danbury & Norwalk Railroad through Pimpewaug. From March to December 1851 he employed between 51 and 86 Irishmen (and only Irishmen) each month in constructing roadbeds and laying tracks. One working man, Timothy Sullivan, was paid 75 cents per day, working six days per week throughout March, for a total of $14.44. Of that, $10 was deducted for board. The line opened in February 1852.

Thomas Cannon became a town selectman and was involved with the D&L Lockwood Company's wire mill, perhaps as its manager. The mill supplied brass and copper wire throughout much of the United States.

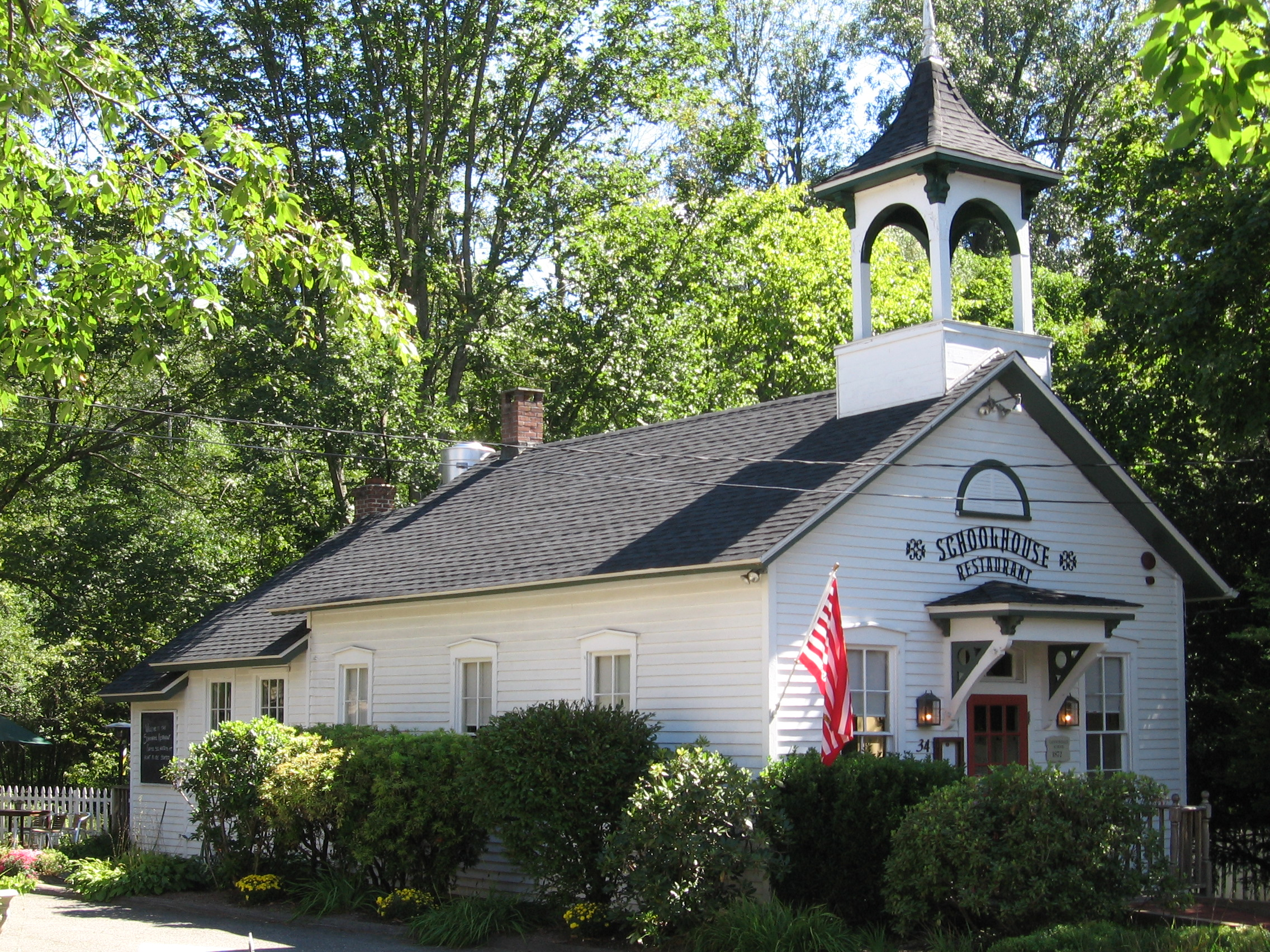
1872 Cannondale School building, now a restaurant

In 1860, Cannondale had about 250 residents, making up 13 percent of the town's population. U.S. Census records showed that most residents were farmers, with a typical home including two parents, two children and a boarder or employee of the family, working as either a servant or farm laborer. Farms typically were about 60 acres (240,000 m^{2}) in size, and typical products from them were butter, cattle, potatoes, buckwheat, cider, oxen, horses, swine and sheep. The occupations of 106 Cannondale residents who responded to the census showed 32 were farmers, 20 farm laborer, 11 servants, 10 shoemakers, six shirt makers, six carpenters, four teachers, four blacksmiths. There were a few wealthy families and no paupers. The neighborhood had three businesses that year: A hub factory run by George and William Nichols; wagons made by Charles Cole and hoes manufactured by Charles Gregory.

In 1872, a second schoolhouse was built in Cannondale to replace the first. The new schoolhouse was on the corner of Danbury and Olmstead Hill roads. By 1900, the neighborhood had become home to people of more varied occupations than farming. There were some laborers, many of whom worked at the Gilbert & Bennett wire factory in Georgetown, just to the north.

In 1899 the Cannon Grange was founded with 53 members. At a meeting in a local home (within 500 feet (150 m) from where the present Grange building stands), members of the Norfield Grange described how their organization worked and what it did.

=== 20th century ===
In 1952–1953, Zion Hill Methodist Episcopal Church at 470 Danbury Road was moved to a new location on its property with a new foundation. It was decided that the church's old horse sheds, built in 1885 and dilapidated, must be removed. One longtime church member, Bess Warncke, was fond of the sheds and said they would be removed "over my dead body". But the church decided they must go to make way for more parking. According to historian Robert Russell, "On the October 1952 weekend that they were removed, Bess Warncke died."

Cannon Crossing, an 8-acre (32,000 m^{2}) restoration of a pre-Civil War village, with 19th-century buildings just across the railroad tracks from the Cannondale train station, was created by actress June Havoc, who sold the property in 1989.
