= Bronxville (disambiguation) =

Bronxville is a village in Westchester County, New York

Bronxville may also refer to:

- Bronxville Public Library, the public library of Bronxville
- Bronxville Reformed Church, a parish church of the Reformed Church in America in Bronxville
- Bronxville station, a commuter rail stop in Bronxville
- Bronxville Union Free School District, the public school district of Bronxville
- Bronxville Women's Club, a women's club in Bronxville
