= Cedar Knolls, New York =

Cedar Knolls – Historic Landmark District
- District
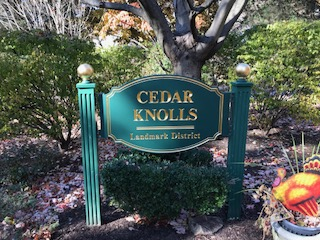
- Cedar Knolls Entrance on Pondfield Rd West

- Location in Westchester County, New York Cedar Knolls (the United States)
- Coordinates: 40°56′27″N 73°50′19″W
- Country: United States
- State: New York
- County: Westchester
- City: Yonkers

Government
  - Mayor, City of Yonkers: Mike Spano(D)
  - Yonkers: City: City Council President – Liam J. McLaughlin; 5th District Councilman – Mike Breen
  - Westchester County: County: County Executive – Rob Astorino; County Legislator for the 15th District – Gordon A. Burrows
  - New York: State: Governor – Andrew Cuomo; State Senator for the 37th Senate District- George Latimer; State Assemblywoman for Assembly District 90 – Shelly Mayer; Representative for NY Congressional District 16 – Eliot Engel
  - United States of America: Federal: President – Donald Trump; Senator – Chuck Schumer; Senator – Kirsten Gillibrand

Area
  - Total: 104 acres (42 ha)
- Zip Code: 10708
- Area code: 914

Cedar Knolls is a neighborhood of the city of Yonkers in New York's Westchester County, known for its neoclassical-style architecture of its houses, giving it a "frozen in time" look of an early-20th century town. It shares a zip code and postal address with the neighboring Bronxville, New York village.

Established in 1913, the 104-acre community is home to fewer than 200 homes. There are no stores or sidewalks. Granted landmark status in 1996, the district's Landmarks Preservation Board oversees home modifications, including changes to landscapes, construction of new buildings, alterations of existing buildings, exterior paint color, and removal of trees taller than eight feet.

Present-day Cedar Knolls is located on land historically associated with the Wecquaesgeek tribe of the Lenape nation. Beginning in the 17th century, Dutch colonists settled the area.

Notable former residents include Ford C. Frick, the former commissioner of Major League Baseball, composer Jerome Kern, and Charlie Chaplin.

== Early history ==
=== The Lenape Nation ===
The district known today as Cedar Knolls was originally part of the hunting, fishing, and farming grounds of the Wecquaesgeek tribe of the Lenape nation. The Lenape were once sovereign over a vast domain stretching along the Middle Atlantic coast from New York to Delaware Bay, between Long Island Sound and the Atlantic coast to the Delaware River valley. The tribe made its settlements on the banks of the rivers that flowed between the surrounding hills and on knolls that held special significance for the Lenape. One of their longhouses served as a wintertime school and was located on a knoll overlooking the present site of the Patricia A. Dichiaro School on Bronxville Road, then a major trail.

=== Colonial era ===
The Dutch attorney Adriaen van der Donck was issued a royal grant to territory along the banks of the Hudson River encompassing present-day Yonkers. The name "Yonkers" is generally thought to be derived from a variant of Van der Donck's honorific, Donck-Heer (or Jonkheer). Soon after the New Amsterdam colony was surrendered to the British in 1664, Frederick Philipse was issued a royal grant to the Van der Donck land. On his estate, Philipse built a large manse (restored as Philipse Manor Hall) and attracted settlers to develop the town along the banks of the Hudson River. During the 1600s and 1700s, Yonkers flourished and became a significant coastal city supported by farming, light manufacturing, and river-based trading.

In 1760, pioneer settler Eleazer Hart bought 154 acres of farmland, including a small house erected in 1725, and Hart named it the Cedar Knolls Farm. Incorporating the original house, he erected a larger farmhouse that still stands on Bronxville Road. In present-day terms, the Cedar Knolls Farm extended from the Bronx River west to today's Birch Brook Road and from Palmer Road north to an east–west line corresponding to today's Wiltshire Street.

=== 19th century ===
Completed in 1852, the New York and Harlem Railroad ran northward from New York City, passing through the Harlem Valley and skirting the eastern boundary of Yonkers. Originally planned to be laid down along what is now Central Park Avenue, the rail bed was diverted through Tuckahoe mid-construction to facilitate the shipment of heavy loads from the highly regarded Tuckahoe marble quarries, active in the years 1818 to 1930. The pure white Tuckahoe marble was used to build the United States Capitol and St. Patrick's Cathedral. The white marble can be seen locally in the 1911 County Bridge, where Pondfield Road West crosses the Bronx River and the Bronx River Parkway.

Train stations were established every mile or so along the line, and villages developed around them. One of these stations was built in 1844 at the site of a river ford, Underhill's Crossing, which was later renamed Bronxville. Trains ran twice a day in each direction, 90 minutes each way.

In 1876, Nathaniel Valentine bought the Cedar Knolls Farm and subdivided it. In the early 1880s, the land between present-day Cedar Knolls and Bronxville was subdivided and named Armour Villa. Armour Villa was the first of three artist colonies to be established around the Bronxville train station. The second artist colony was Lawrence Park, developed in Bronxville by William Van Duzer Lawrence in 1889. The third and final artist colony was Cedar Knolls. Its provenance resurfaced in an offering of 1893–94 that referred to “266 Choice Lots Being a Part of Cedar Knolls at Bronxville in the City of Yonkers.” Present-day Bronxville Road, Chatfield Road, Bayberry Street, and Palmer Road are generally bound by this subdivision. The subdivision offering was never fully actualized as planned, and it contained a large, blank portion referred to as Plat A. Early in the next century, Plat A was to be subdivided as present-day Cedar Knolls.

Cedar Knolls was considered a frontier outpost in the late 1880s and early 1890s. The only nearby thoroughfares, Bronxville Road and Palmer Road, were mere paths unconnected with the hamlet of Bronxville and only vaguely connected with Yonkers. There were no other roads, utilities, services, or stores. Just a farm and a train stop, a rowboat's ride away.

=== 20th and 21st centuries ===
Between 1902 and 1910, title to the Plat A area changed hands several times, and it was finally subdivided as The Cedar Knolls at Bronxville in the City of Yonkers. Map No. 2026, dated May 18, 1910, illustrates a neighborhood nearly identical to today's Cedar Knolls. The boundaries are the same, with the later addition of Adele Lane constituting the only modification to the 1910 plan. By 1911, the subdivision plan was illustrated on a Yonkers city map. Illustrated, complete with sewer lines, were the first three roads to be built: Swain Street (now Pondfield Road West), Dellwood Road, and Beachbrook Avenue (now Birch Brook Road). Marketing of the subdivision by the ultimate developer of Cedar Knolls, the Merrilees Corporation, first appeared in a local paper (The News) in 1912.

By 1912, extensive excavation of an extension of Swain Street allowed for a connection to Pondfield Road in Bronxville. Swain Street was then renamed Pondfield Road West. This coincided with building a stately stone bridge, the 1911 County Bridge, over the Bronx River, providing a very marketable access point to and from the Bronxville train station. A second stone bridge over the newly completed Bronx River Parkway was constructed nearby in 1917. Also, a shanty town between the bridges and Cedar Knolls was replaced by the tall brick apartment buildings present along Pondfield Road West. The imposing Colonial Revival house at 98 Pondfield Road West was the first house built in Cedar Knolls. Work on the house had begun by 1911 and was completed in 1913. Other lovely houses quickly followed in an era characterized by craftsmanship, classical lines, and proper proportion.

In the 1920s and 1930s, Cedar Knolls had to accommodate its growth. Automobile traffic and speeds were addressed for the first time with traffic signs and speed limits. The illumination from the original gas-lit street lamps proved inadequate, and in the 1920s, the lamps were replaced by the first electric streetlights. With increasing sources of fire, the newly established homeowners' association, Cedar Knolls Colony, successfully petitioned the city to build Fire Station 11 at the corner of Bronxville Road and Bayberry Street in 1921, and to install the first fire hydrants in the neighborhood in 1935. The water source for the hydrants comes from a 20-foot diameter aqueduct cut through the underlying granite about 250 feet below Cedar Knolls, completed in 1942 as part of the Kensico-Hillview Water Tunnel.

In the early 1950s, fearing an onslaught of tract houses being built in Cedar Knolls, the Cedar Knolls Colony successfully petitioned the city to zone Cedar Knolls as S75 lots requiring a minimum 75-foot frontage and 7,500 square feet of acreage for all new construction. Fifty years later, the Cedar Knolls Colony would investigate a special zoning overlay to restrict the construction of overly large homes and keep the neighborhood consistent.

In its first 50 years, many of the homeowners in the artist colony of Cedar Knolls were artists, broadly defined. There were noted actors, film studio executives, artists, musicians, lyricists, playwrights, writers, publicists, architects, horticulturists, landscape designers, and dress designers. What became known as modern Broadway began with Jerome Kern, one of the most prolific of American songwriters and playwrights and an early resident of the Cedar Knolls community. He wrote most of his musicals and songs in the library of his home at 107 Dellwood Road. Before Kern, musicals were disjointed vaudevillian reviews. After Kern, Broadway musicals established a story line, often containing pointed social commentary, with music to match. In 1927, he wrote Show Boat, considered to be an American masterpiece and a milestone in the history of musical theater.

Cedar Knolls has also been host to many sports figures and people associated with sports, especially during the 1940s and 1950s. Ford C. Frick, ghost writer for Babe Ruth, president of the National League (1934–1951), founder of the Baseball Hall of Fame (1939), and Commissioner of Baseball (1951–1965), lived on Dellwood Road during much of this time. Prior to the invention of reliable stop-action photography, artist Lon Keller (Beechmont Avenue) pioneered the drawing of sports figures in action poses for magazines such as Sports Illustrated. He also designed the world-famous New York Yankees logo, incorporating a baseball bat and top hat; Lee McPhail, owner of the Yankees in 1949, wanted a patriotic post-war Yankee logo, and he got it with Lon's use of Uncle Sam's top hat with a red, white, and blue motif. The Yankees needed good legal representation then and attorney Tony Caputo (Pondfield Road West) provided the team with it for many years.

In 2004, the triangular park at the confluence of Pondfield Road West and Dellwood Road was officially renamed Darcy Plaza, in memory of Dwight Darcy, a resident who died on September 11, 2001, in the attack on the World Trade Center.

In 2005, Cedar Knolls was awarded a state grant for neighborhood beautification. The funds were used to design and purchase period street signs and portal signs. Two bronze plaques were installed on the stone columns on Birch Brook Road. Street signs and posts were installed on each corner borrowing their design from the one remaining gas light stanchion that still stood in Cedar Knolls after the other gas lights had been turned off and removed in the 1920s.

== Cedar Knolls Colony ==
In the spring of 1918, six of the first homeowners met to form the second-oldest homeowners’ association in the City of Yonkers and officially named their association The Cedar Knolls Colony. The original six were William Riggs, Gardner Taylor, Thomas Massey, A. Carlyle Porteus, A. H. Babcock, and Wentworth Hicks, at whose house on Pondfield Road West they first met to form the association. There they elected William Riggs the first president and wrote the first bylaws.

The association was initially open only to male residents, with membership by invitation only; therefore, not all homeowners were members. Each prospective member was sponsored for membership and was required to pay an initiation fee. Mandatory annual dues were $5 (equivalent to about $100 in today's currency). Special assessments were sometimes imposed for special projects. With time, changing social norms brought a more relaxed style to the Colony. By the 1980s, the formal bylaws gave way to consensus guidelines and practices, membership became available to any adult resident, and dues became voluntary contributions.

During its first 50 years, Cedar Knolls Colony was known for its social gatherings and seasonal dances. Cedar Knolls homeowners took great interest in horticulture, gardening, and landscaping. The Colony coordinated directly with five garden clubs in Bronxville and Yonkers and less formally with other clubs in the county.

In 1920, the association's newly adopted name was engraved on a sterling silver Tiffany trophy, designed and executed by Louis Comfort Tiffany himself, presented to that year's inaugural winner of the Cedar Knolls Colony Golf Tournament. The trophy allows for perpetual engravings of the names of each year's champion – and for a ceremonial swig of champagne by all the contestants. The trophy cup was donated to the Colony by its first winner, Jerome Kern, and is generally known as the Cedar Knolls Colony Jerome Kern Cup. The tournament has been held annually since 1920 with a few interruptions.

After World War II, the Cedar Knolls Colony found a way to combine its gardening and gala activities. In 1949, the National Tulip Society designated Cedar Knolls the Tulip Center of Westchester County. The Associated Bulb Growers of Holland donated 5000 tulip bulbs to Cedar Knolls residents for the cultivation of tulips and held an annual tulip contest in Cedar Knolls, which lasted for 25 years.

There is no longer a golf club along the western edge, but thanks to the Cedar Knolls Colony, part of that area is now home to a branch of the Yonkers public library and a park with sports fields and tennis courts. Pondfield Road West does not connect with the busy retail thoroughfare Central Park Avenue as originally planned, and the neighborhood remains relatively secluded. To preserve this unique neighborhood, every generation of Cedar Knolls homeowners has indeed "cooperated with one another in matters pertaining to mutual welfare."

== Architecture and landscape ==
At the end of the 19th century, controlled, picturesque settings for planned landscapes called the Aesthetic Movement became popular. A reaction to American society's increasing industrialization and urbanization, this movement sought to emphasize the bucolic and restorative qualities of rural home life. In these planned rural landscapes, nature was manipulated for aesthetic purposes. Typically, the often-hilly topography was accommodated by meandering roads and lanes organized to enhance already scenic views, in what was called the curvilinear plan. The curvilinear plan was to become a primary element for developing Cedar Knolls. Starting in 1910, the Cedar Knolls subdivision was executed as planned, embracing a unique period of American architecture, utilizing a curvilinear plan, and resulted in the architectural cohesiveness that exists in Cedar Knolls to this day.

The pink granite of Cedar Knolls is distinctive in both quality and color due to the presence of serpentine, an ochreous mineral that laces the rock. This characteristic stone is very apparent throughout the neighborhood in many foundations, façades, and retaining walls. The soils of Cedar Knolls are composed of the products of decay and erosion of the original igneous and sedimentary rocks. This debris of disintegration was added to residual soils and clays, constituting a soil combination of many ingredients favorable to the growth of plant life. In general, the soil is acidic and requires at intervals the addition of lime and magnesium for bountiful plant growth. The quality of the soil plus the elevation and excellent drainage of the area create a favorable condition for an abundance of plants and trees.

=== American Period House ===
Cedar Knolls was planned and primarily developed during the era of the American Period House, 1910 to 1930. It initiated the modern concepts of an open interior plan and a close relationship between house and private recreational garden, clad in a variety of revival architectural styles.

The plan of the Period House reflected a change in lifestyle for the middle class American, coinciding with a move away from a household staff. Rooms in a Period House are generally rectangular in plan and are larger than those of typical Victorian-era houses, although there are fewer of them. A standard size Period House in Cedar Knolls customarily has a living room, dining room, and kitchen on the ground floor, with a modest entry hall. A large Period House in the district incorporates a more formal entry space, a second porch, a library or den, and additional bedrooms and baths.

The Period House celebrated the arrival of the automobile and the informal freedom for American society that it ushered in. Period Houses in the district constructed pre-1920 are characterized by a detached garage, often a mini-version of the house. By the mid-1920s, garages were an integral element of the house, possibly owing to the improved safety of internal combustion engines.

Cedar Knolls is an excellent example of Period House plans incorporating Period Revival Styles in their façade architecture. Period Revival Styles within Cedar Knolls are primarily Tudor Revival, Colonial Revival, and French Norman Revival, with a smattering of Norman Cottage Revival, Dutch Colonial Revival, Cotswald Cottage Revival, Italian Renaissance Revival, and Mediterranean Colonial Revival. In many instances, Cedar Knolls houses represent eclectic blends of these styles such that no two houses are alike, and few houses exhibit just one style

Nearly 80% of the houses in the district were constructed prior to the Depression and World War II, which together interrupted almost all construction in the Knolls for the following 15 years. Consequently, unlike many communities, Cedar Knolls represents an intact and cohesive residential neighborhood populated with Period House, Revival Style residences for the comfortable middle class homeowner. For these reasons, it is architecturally and historically significant. Moreover, Period House communities such as Cedar Knolls became models for post-war suburban communities all across America.

== Notable residents ==
- Jerome Kern
- Charlie Chaplin
- Ford C. Frick
- Tony Caputo
- Walter Isaacson
- Lon Keller
