= Penrose Stout =

American architect

- Born: 1887; Montgomery, Alabama
- Died: 1934 (aged 46–47); Bronxville, New York
- Occupation: Architect
- Buildings: Merestone Terrace Brooklands Normandy Terrace Bronxville Women's Club

Penrose Stout (1887–1934) was an American architect, best known for designing many Westchester County, New York residences and buildings. Among his many notable designs in Bronxville, New York are Merestone Terrace (1924), Brooklands (1927), Normandy Terrace Townhouses (1928) and the Bronxville Women's Club, (1928) added to the National Register of Historic Places in 2007,

He was born in Montgomery, Alabama, in 1887, and received a degree in architecture from Alabama Polytechnic Institute in 1909. He served in World War I in the Air Corps and earned a Distinguished Service Cross. He moved to Bronxville, New York, in 1919 and was in practice there until his death in 1934. He married Lucia Meigs, granddaughter of William Van Duzer Lawrence (1842–1927), in 1921. In 1924, he designed the house at 105 Lee Circle, Lynchburg, Virginia, now included in the Rivermont Historic District. He also designed or modified a number of residences in the Lawrence Park Historic District at Bronxville and the estate Green Pastures at Middleburg, Virginia.

Nathaniel Stout donated his grandfather's sketchbook and letters to the Archives and History Department of Alabama in 2014. This unprecedented series, first displayed during the centennial of World War I, includes extensive sketches of military training, amusing aspects of camp life, the architecture of the French countryside, and Stout's view from the cockpit.
