= Rivermont Historic District =

Historic district in Virginia, United States

- U.S. National Register of Historic Places
- U.S. Historic district
- Virginia Landmarks Register
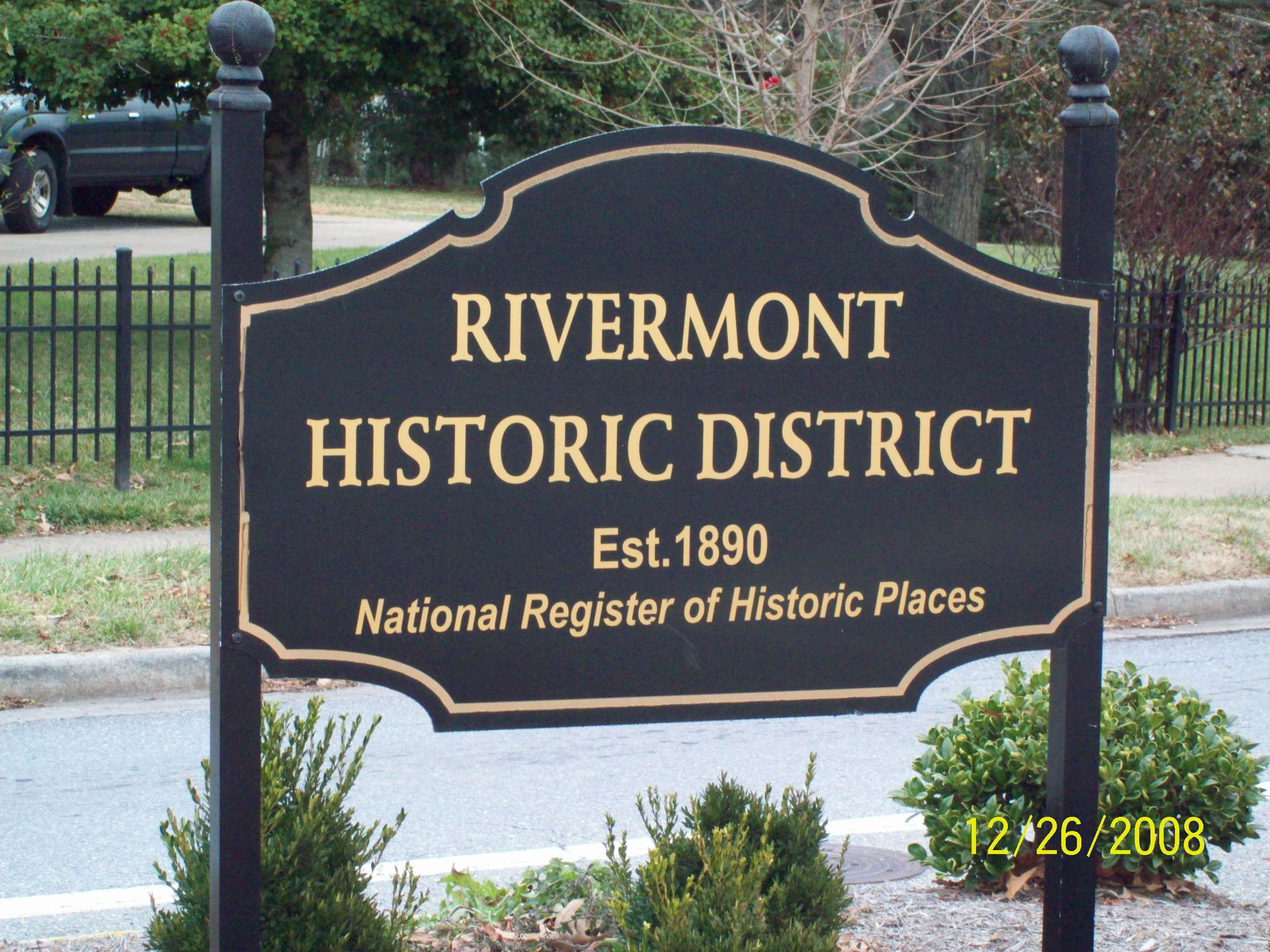
- Rivermont Historic District Sign, December 2008

- Location within Virginia Location within the United States
- Location: Rivermont Ave, Lynchburg, Virginia
- Coordinates: 37°25′43″N 79°9′29″W
- Area: 192.1 acres (77.7 ha)
- Architect: Multiple
- Architectural style: Queen Anne, Beaux Arts, et al.
- NRHP reference No.: 03000224
- VLR No.: 118-0334

Significant dates
- Added to NRHP: April 11, 2003
- Designated VLR: December 4, 2002

The Rivermont Historic District is a national historic district located in Lynchburg, Virginia. It is a 192.10-acre (0.7774 km^{2}) district consisting of the 300-3400 blocks of Rivermont Avenue as well as Riverside Park and a few properties alongside streets that face onto Rivermont Avenue. It is bounded by the James River on the east and northeast, Blackwater Creek on the east and southeast, Daniel's Hill on the north and Virginia Episcopal Road and the southern end of Boonesboro Road.

It is significant as Lynchburg's first planned streetcar community that included a mixture of residential, commercial, and institutional buildings. It includes single-family residences, duplexes, apartment houses, garages, commercial buildings, churches, government buildings, academic buildings, and hospitals. There are a number of highly significant buildings dating from the late 19th and 20th centuries that represent nearly every major American architectural style of that period. The buildings are the work of some of Lynchburg's leading architects from this period, including Stanhope Johnson and Edward G. Frye, as well as Boston architect Ralph Adams Cram, Washington D.C. architect William Poindexter, and New York architect Penrose Stout. As Lynchburg's largest and probably most successful planned subdivision, Rivermont displays several important design features, such as a wide central avenue, parks, schools, and vistas that separate it from older parts of Lynchburg. The district includes the Jones Memorial Library, Main Hall, Randolph-Macon Women's College, and Miller-Claytor House listed separately on the National Register of Historic Places.

It was listed on the National Register of Historic Places in 2003. The District was expanded in 2013 to add one additional building directly adjacent to Rivermont Avenue: The St. John's Episcopal Church on Boston Avenue.

== Gallery ==
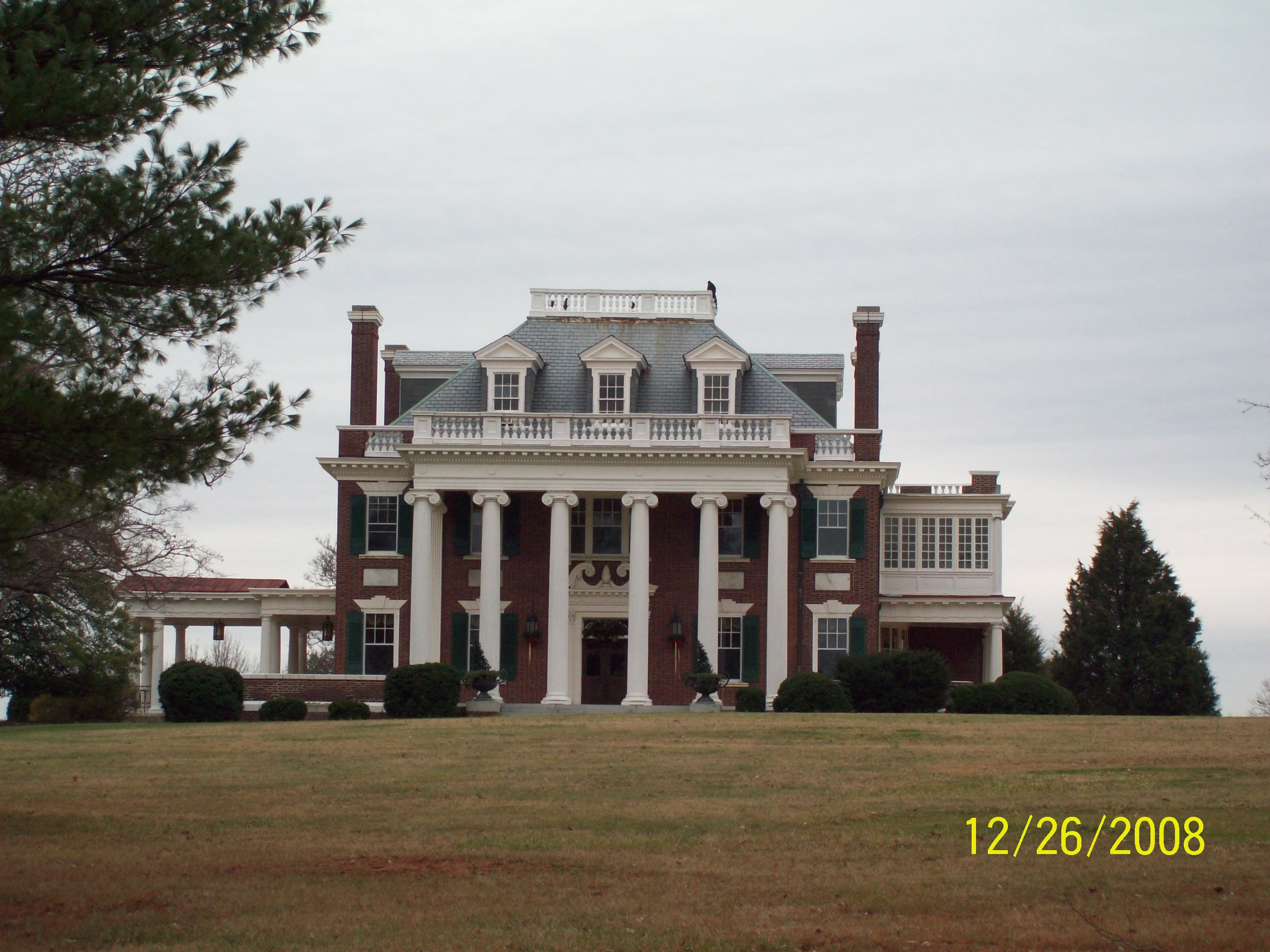
Rivermont Historic District, Villa Maria, Lynchburg VA, December 2008
