= Masterton-Dusenberry House =

Historic house in New York, United States

- U.S. National Register of Historic Places
- New York State Register of Historic Places
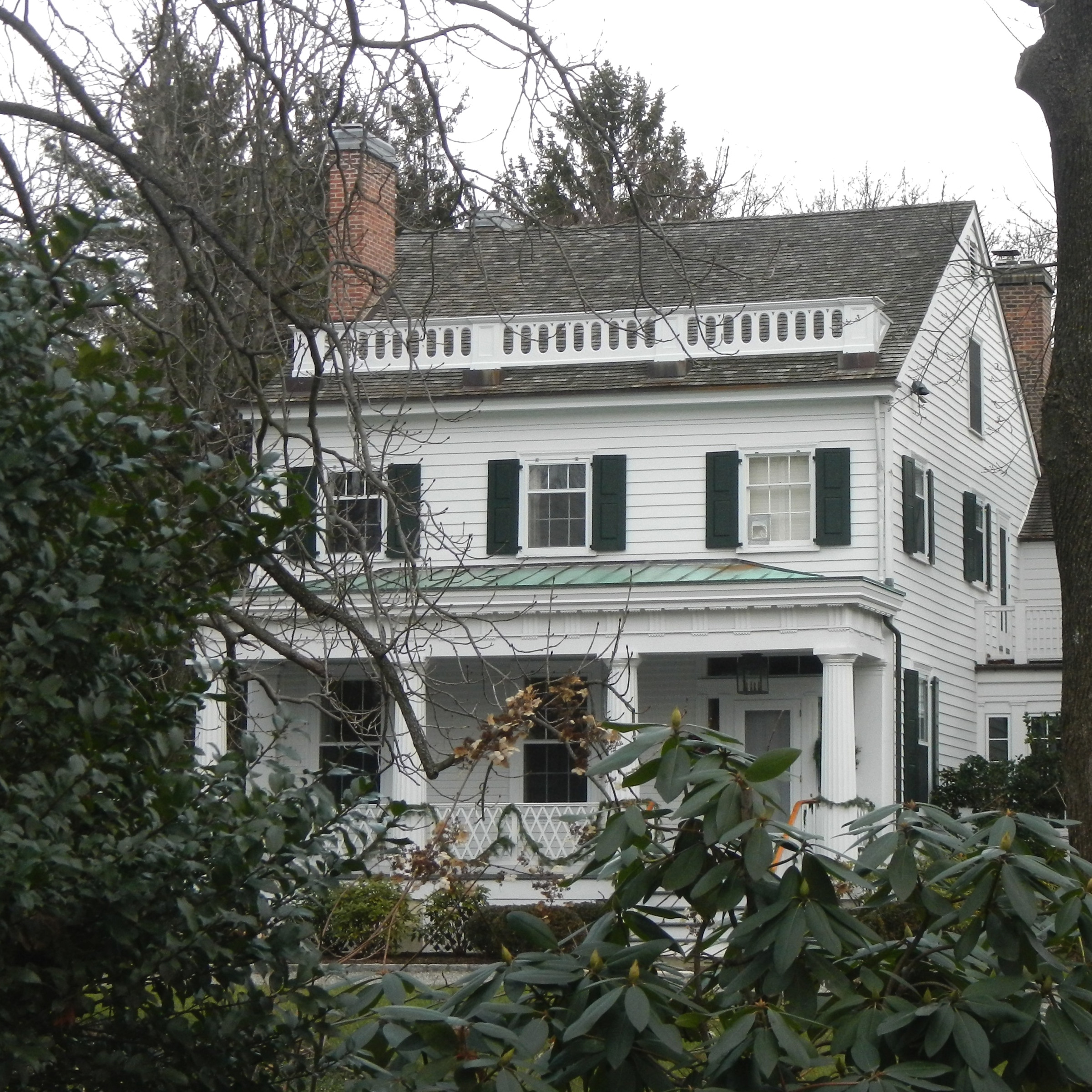
- Masterton-Dusenberry 2012

- Location within New York Location within the United States
- Location: 90 White Plains Rd., Bronxville, New York
- Coordinates: 40°56′14″N 73°49′07″W
- Area: 0.8 acres (0.32 ha)
- Built: 1830
- Architect: Masterton, Alexander
- Architectural style: Greek Revival
- NRHP reference No.: 80002789
- NYSRHP No.: 11952.000001

Significant dates
- Added to NRHP: April 16, 1980
- Designated NYSRHP: June 23, 1980

Masterton-Dusenberry House is a historic home located at Bronxville, Westchester County, New York. It was built in the 1830s in an eclectic Greek Revival style. It was built as a summer home for locally prominent stonemason Alexander Masterton. It is a two-story, wood-frame residence on a stone foundation with a clapboard exterior and gable roof. It features a one-story, three bay wood front porch with an elaborate Doric order entablature, fluted columns, and a delicate railing. It also features a roofline balustrade. An addition was completed in the 1920s.

It was added to the National Register of Historic Places in 1980.

== See also ==
- National Register of Historic Places listings in southern Westchester County, New York
