= Jeanne Darst =

American author

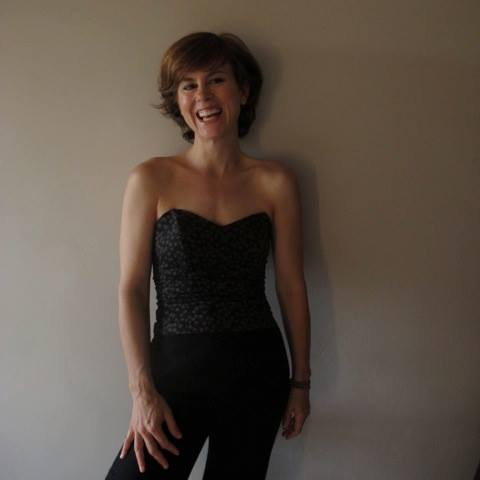
- Born: Doris Jeanne Darst; St. Louis, Missouri
- Education: SUNY Purchase
- Occupation: Author

Jeanne Darst is an American author. She is a regular contributor to This American Life and has written for The New Yorker, The New York Times, The New York Times Magazine, and Vogue. Her memoir, Fiction Ruined My Family, was published in October 2011 by Riverhead Books.

== Early life ==
The youngest of four girls, Darst was born in St. Louis, Missouri, and moved to Stony Hill Farm in Amagansett, New York, when she was 7 so that her father, a newspaperman and writer for Harper's Magazine, The Nation, and The New York Times, could write his first novel. The family planned to return to Missouri after one year. The family did not move back to St. Louis, however: they moved to Bronxville, where Darst attended Bronxville High School. She received her B.A. at SUNY Purchase, where she began to write and perform her plays.

On her father's side was a family of writers. Her grandmother, Katharine Darst, was a writer for the St. Louis Globe-Democrat, with a daily column called "Here and There" and a Sunday column called "The Back Seat Driver". She also had a radio show on KMOX, a CBS affiliate, in the 1940s. Her grandfather, James Darst, was a reporter for the St. Louis Globe-Democrat as well as director of Fox Movietone News. Darst's first cousin is Thomas French, Pulitzer Prize-winning journalist for the St. Petersburg Times.

Her great-uncle was Joseph Darst, mayor of St. Louis from 1949 to 1953. Darst's mother, Doris Jeanne Gissy, was, at age 14, the youngest person to appear on the cover of Sports Illustrated. Gissy appeared on the magazine's cover in August 1956 for horse riding along with her sister Ruth Gissy.

== Writing career ==
Her memoir, Fiction Ruined My Family, was published in October 2011 by Riverhead Books. It was excerpted in the October 2011 issue of Vogue. Fiction Ruined My Family is Darst's memoir of growing up in a boozy, literary family and then battling her own alcohol problem. Janet Maslin of The New York Times called it "a winningly snarky memoir" and The New Yorker called it "darkly comic" and "highly entertaining."

Darst wrote and produced a pilot of Fiction Ruined My Family for HBO. She has written for television since 2015. Her cartoons have been published in The New Yorker, and in 2025 her essay, The Eighteen Letters Project, was published by The New Yorker. Her play, Je Regrette Tout!, based on the life of her mother and Edith Piaf, was produced by Phantom Theater in Vermont. In 2018 Darst adapted JAWS for the stage and recruited her family to be in it in Phantom Theater's barn in Warren, Vermont.
