= Michelle Ekizian =

American composer of Armenian heritage

Michelle Ekizian (born November 21, 1956) is an American composer.

== Life ==
Michelle Ekizian was born in Bronxville, New York. She graduated with a bachelor's degree from the Manhattan School of Music and a master's degree from Columbia University, having studied with Chou Wen-chung, Mario Davidovsky, Nicolas Flagello and Vladimir Ussachevsky. Her music has been performed internationally.

== Honors and awards ==
- American Prix de Rome from the American Academy in Rome, 1988
- Commerce Bank International Composition Award, 1987
- Indiana State University/Louisville Orchestra New Music Competition Prize, 1990
- Aram Khachaturian Award
- ACA Recording Award
- John Simon Guggenheim Memorial Foundation fellowship
- National Endowment for the Arts fellowship

== Works ==
Selected works include:

- Octoéchos for Double String Quartet and Soprano
- The Exiled Heart orchestral cycle, including The Exiled Heart (1986), Morning of Light (1988), and Beyond the Reach of Wind and Fire (1989)
- Symphony #1: When Light Divided
- Slow Apocolypse: Fanfare for Orchestra Manque, 1995
- A Saint Gregory Moment
- David of Sassoun, 1992
- Sabre Dances for orchestra, 1991
- Red Harvest: Concerto for violin and orchestra

Her music has been recorded and issued on CD, including:

- Works by Michelle Ekizian and Louis Karchin, New World Records
- American Academy in Rome spring concert, 1989 June 5
