= Green Pastures (Middleburg, Virginia) =

Historic house in Virginia, United States

- U.S. National Register of Historic Places
- Virginia Landmarks Register
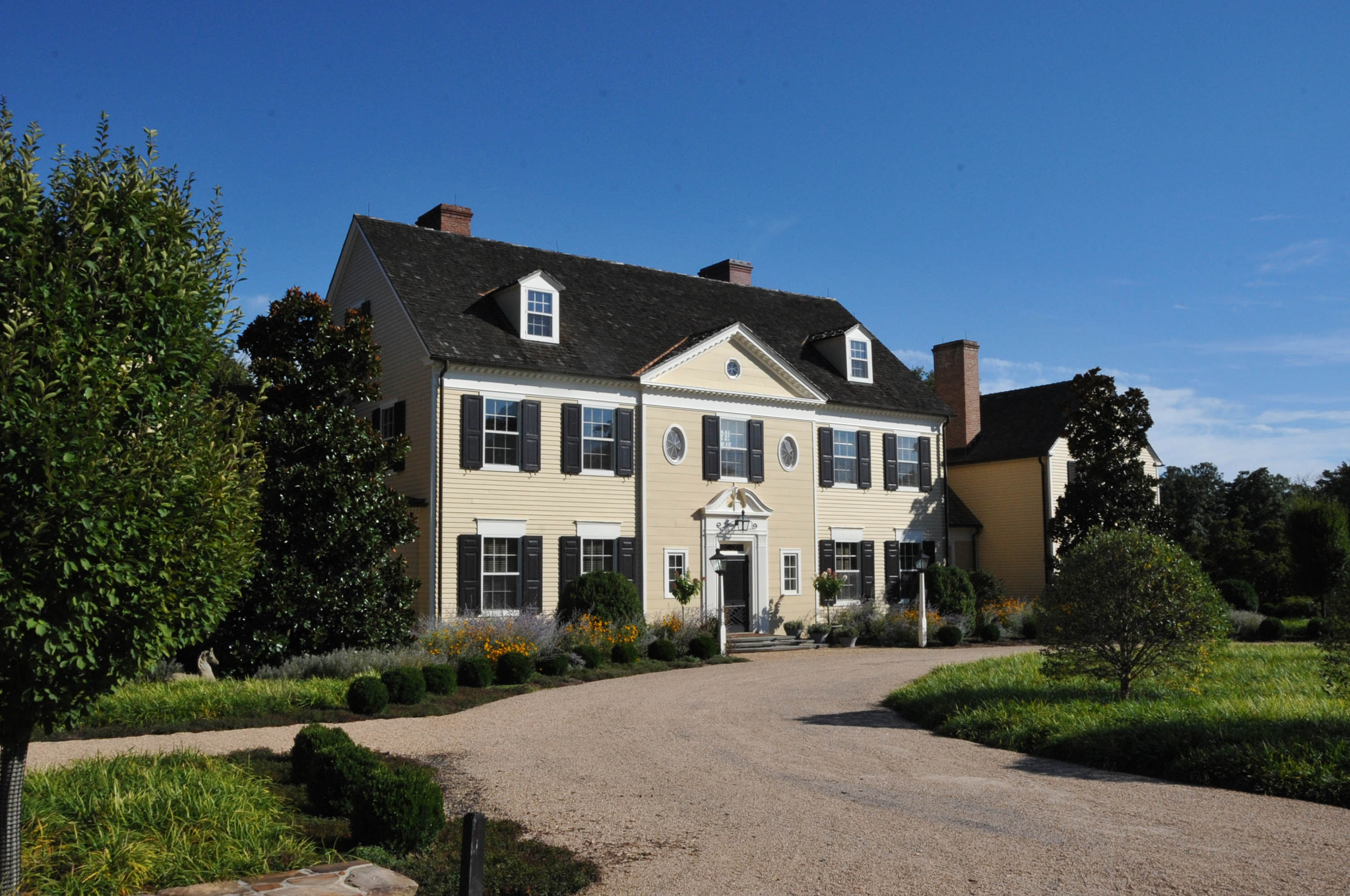

- Location within Northern Virginia Location within Virginia Location within the United States
- Location: 2337 Zulla Rd., near Middleburg, Virginia
- Coordinates: 38°56′20″N 77°47′32″W
- Area: 236.1 acres (95.5 ha)
- Built: 1931-1932
- Architect: Stout, Penrose V.; Fuller, Arthur K., et al.
- Architectural style: Colonial Revival
- NRHP reference No.: 02000596
- VLR No.: 030-0742

Significant dates
- Added to NRHP: May 29, 2002
- Designated VLR: March 13, 2002

Green Pastures is a historic home and farming complex and national historic district located near Middleburg, Fauquier County, Virginia. Recognized as having been owned by industrialist and financier Robert Earll McConnell, the district encompasses 13 contributing buildings built between 1931 and 1947. The include a Colonial Revival style manor house inspired by Mount Vernon, a smokehouse, stable, hostlers' quarters, farmer's cottage, garage and cow shed, chicken house and cow barn designed by New York architect Penrose V. Stout and built between 1931 and 1932; a stone sheep shed, a masonry workshop, a metal machine shed and log cabin built between 1935 and 1947. The frame manor house consist of a 2 1/2-story, seven-bay central section flanked by hyphens connected to two-story flanking wings.

It was listed on the National Register of Historic Places in 2002.
