= Eleazer Hart House =

Historic house in New York, United States

- U.S. National Register of Historic Places
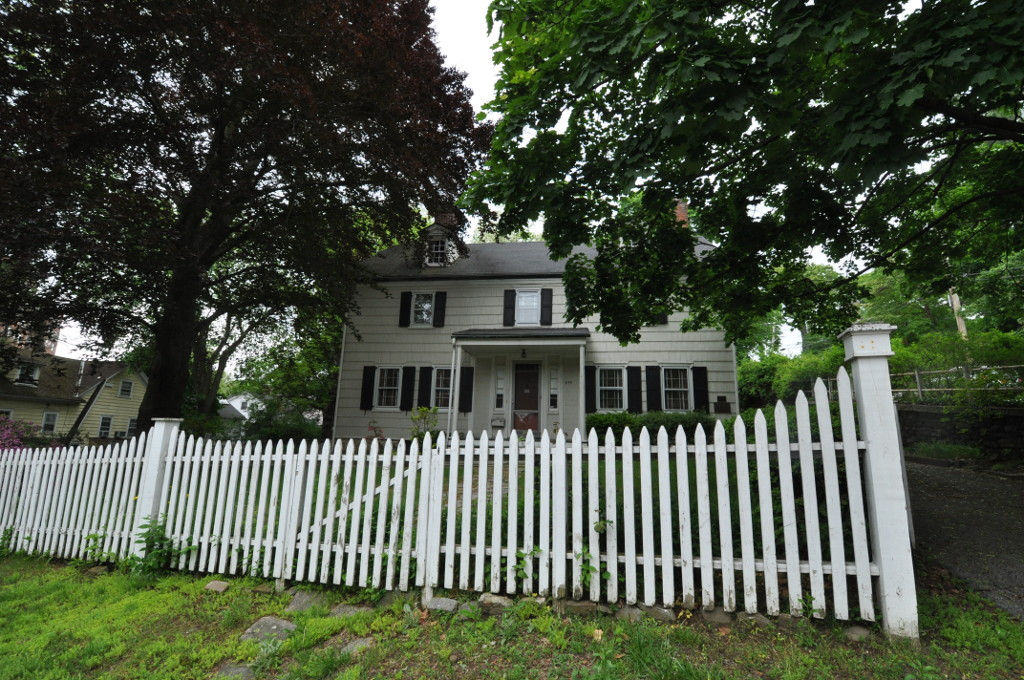

- Location within New York Location within the United States
- Location: 243 Bronxville Rd., Yonkers, New York
- Coordinates: 40°56′30″N 73°50′28″W
- Area: less than one acre
- Built: 1783
- Architectural style: Federal
- NRHP reference No.: 82003417
- Added to NRHP: July 29, 1982

Eleazer Hart House is a historic home located at 243 Bronxville Road in the Cedar Knolls section of Southeast Yonkers, Westchester County, New York, United States. It was built in 1788 and is a Federal period residence. The building incorporates an earlier tenant farmhouse dating from the Philipse Manor era (1684–1783) and most likely dates to about 1760. The older house is a 1 1/2-story, three-by-two-bay building on a stone foundation. The main house is five bays wide on the first floor and three bays on the second. It has a gable roof and is clad in wide shingles, painted white. Also on the property is a 1 1/2-story, gable-roofed barn.

It was added to the National Register of Historic Places in 1982.
