= Reformed Church of Bronxville =

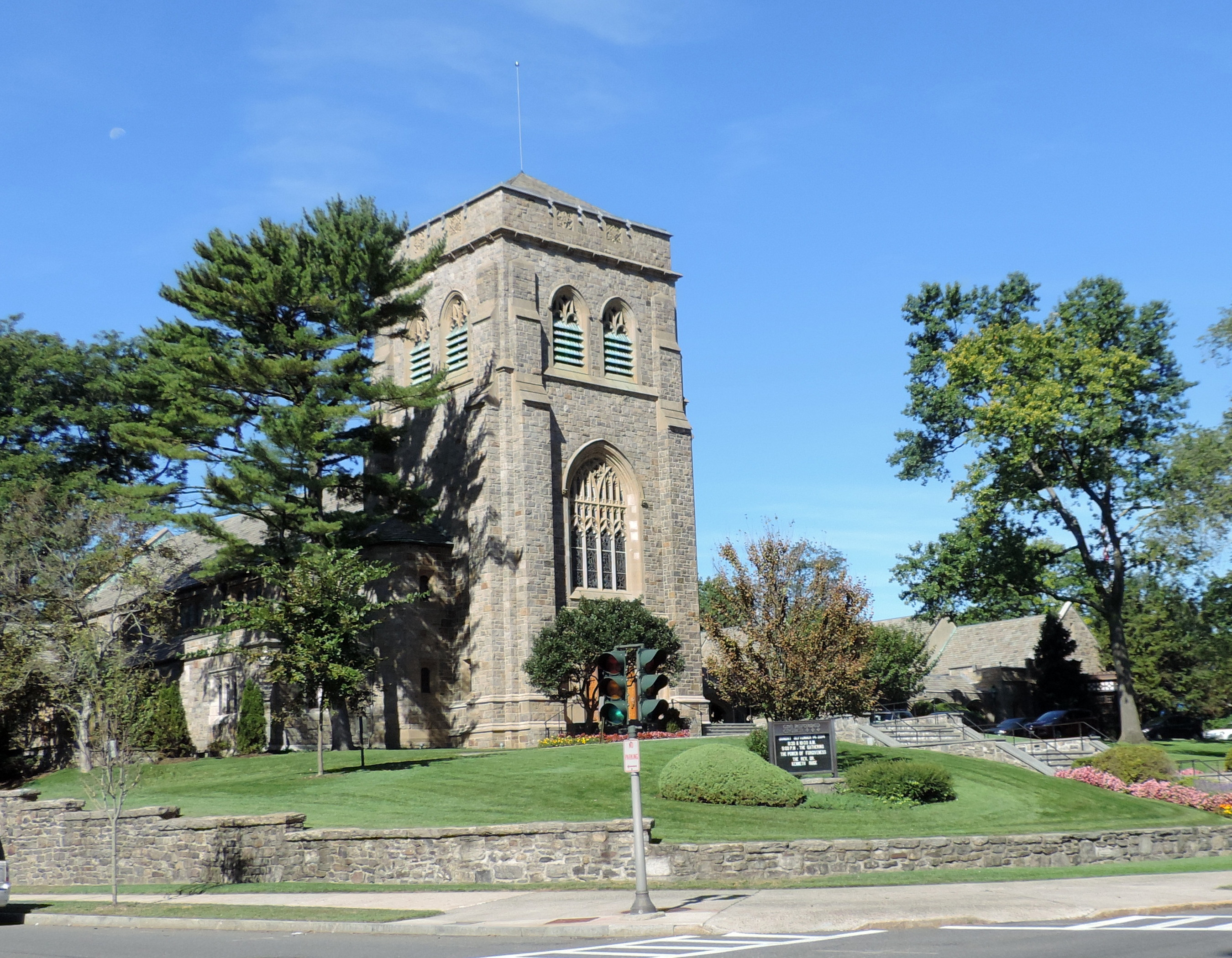
- View from the intersection of Pondfield Road and Midland Avenue
- Reformed Church of Bronxville
- 40°56′11.5″N 73°49′56.9″W
- Location: 180 Pondfield Rd, Bronxville, New York
- Denomination: Reformed Church in America
- Website: www.reformedchurch.org

History
- Status: Parish church
- Founded: 1850
- Dedicated: 1926

Architecture
- Functional status: Active
- Architect(s): Harry Leslie Walker; Eggers & Higgins
- Style: Norman
- Completed: 1926 (expanded 1957)

The Reformed Church of Bronxville is a parish church of the Reformed Church in America, and previously the Dutch Reformed Church, located in Bronxville, New York.

== History ==
The Reformed Church of Bronxville was founded in 1850 in its present location, on a two-acre hill above the corner of Midland Avenue and Pondfield Road in the village of Bronxville. The first church building was a smaller, New England-stye, wooden clapboard building, and was dedicated on April 9, 1850. Though the original belfry was constructed simultaneously with the rest of the church, it was not outfitted with bells until money was raised by Sunday school children in 1872.

The church was eventually replaced with the current Norman-style stone and granite structure in 1926, following a vote of the congregation in 1923 to construct a larger church. The architect of the new building was Harry Leslie Walker, a member of the church and the designer of the other institutions constituting the village's "Four Corners:" Bronxville High School in 1924 and the Bronxville Public Library in 1942. Upon its completion, the church was consecrated in 1926. The stained glass windows were designed by the prominent artist Charles Jay Connick.

In the twentieth century, due to increasing membership, the church underwent further expansion. Following a seven-year fundraising campaign, a lot on the corner of Midland and Kraft Avenues was purchased. On this land was added a nursery school, a 40-foot expansion of the chancel to accommodate a larger pipe organ, an usher's parlor adjacent to the narthex, a chapel, a social hall, a glass enclosure of the cloister, and a parking lot in 1955. This complex was designed by Eggers & Higgins and dedicated in September 1957.
