= Bronxville Women's Club =

- U.S. National Register of Historic Places
- New York State Register of Historic Places
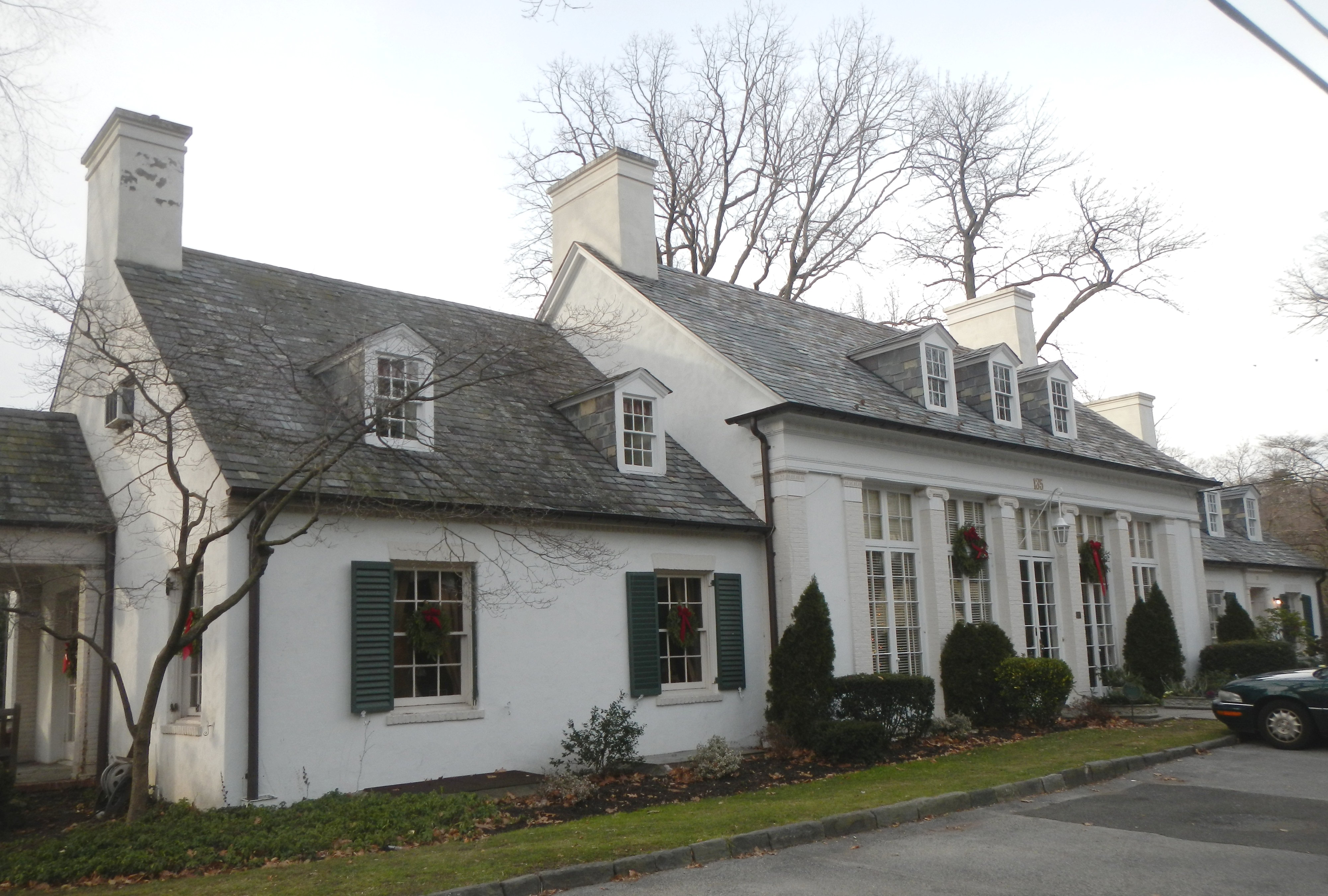

- Location within New York Location within the United States
- Location: 135 Midland Avenue, Bronxville, New York
- Coordinates: 40°56′30″N 73°49′36″W
- Area: less than one acre
- Built: 1927
- Architect: Penrose V. Stout
- Architectural style: Colonial Revival
- NRHP reference No.: 07001041
- NYSRHP No.: 11952.000230

Significant dates
- Added to NRHP: October 3, 2007
- Designated NYSRHP: August 13, 2007

Bronxville Women's Club is a historic women's club located in Bronxville, Westchester County, New York. Its building was constructed from 1927 to 1928 in the Colonial Revival style and was designed by noted local architect Penrose Stout (1887–1934). Its layout is that of a T-shape, constructed of stuccoed brick on a poured concrete foundation. The front elevation is one and one half stories with a central pavilion flanked by two smaller, recessed pavilions. It has a prominent slate-covered gable roof. The rear of the front section is two and one half stories tall. Most of the ground floor is occupied by an auditorium. The building was added to the National Register of Historic Places in 2007.

The club, as an organization, was founded in 1925 by Anna Bisand, daughter of William Van Duzer Lawrence (1842–1927), one of the founders of Bronxville. The club exists today as a non-profit educational, social, artistic, and philanthropic membership-based organization.

== See also ==
- National Register of Historic Places listings in southern Westchester County, New York
