= Lon Keller =

American artist (1907–1995)

Henry Alonzo Keller
- Born: 1907; Lititz, Pennsylvania
- Died: June 28, 1995 (aged 87–88); DeLand, Florida
- Education: Syracuse University
- Known for: Oil painting

Henry Alonzo Keller (1907–1995), known as Lon Keller, was an American artist who specialized in sports art.

Keller created the top-hat logo for the New York Yankees in 1947, and was a program cover artist for most colleges and universities, numerous high schools, the NFL, the Brooklyn Dodgers, New York Giants, the Harlem Globetrotters, the Army, Navy and Air Force academies, and more.

In 1991, Keller was inducted into the New York Sports Museum & Hall of Fame for his groundbreaking contributions to sports art.

A gallery of his art may be viewed at www.lonkeller.com, maintained by his eldest son, Jay Keller.
