= NewYork-Presbyterian Westchester =

- NewYork-Presbyterian Hospital
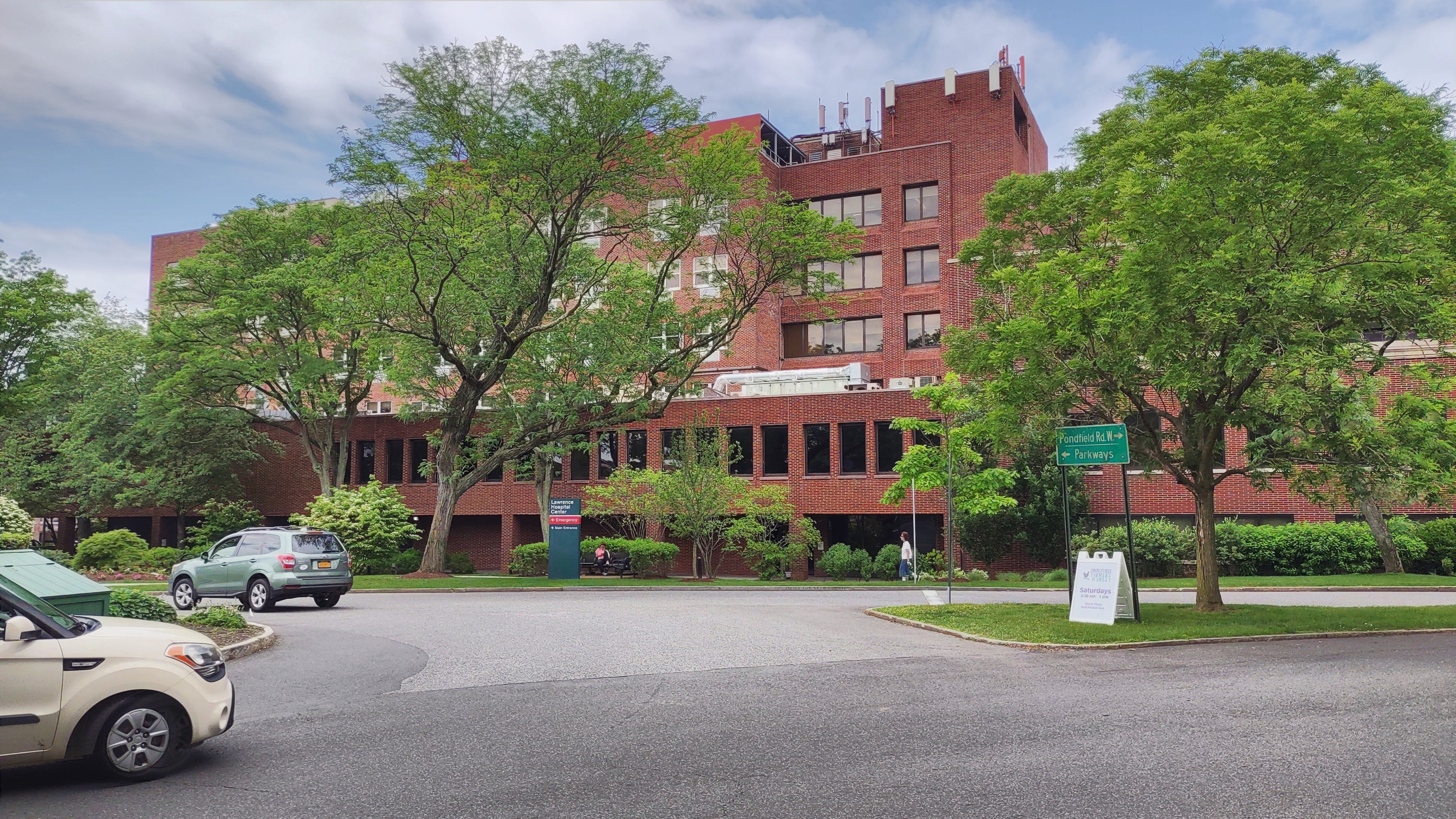
- Hospital as seen from traffic circle in 2021

Geography
- Location: 55 Palmer Avenue, Bronxville, New York, United States
- Coordinates: 40°56′32″N 73°50′12″W

Organization
- Funding: Non-profit hospital
- Type: General
- Affiliated university: Columbia University Vagelos College of Physicians and Surgeons

Services
- Standards: JCAHO
- Beds: 288 (since 2022)

History
- Former names: NewYork-Presbyterian/Lawrence Hospital (2014–2022); Lawrence Hospital Center (1909–2014)
- Opened: 1909

Links
- Website: www.nyp.org/westchester
- Lists: Hospitals in New York State

NewYork-Presbyterian Westchester (formerly NewYork-Presbyterian Lawrence Hospital, and Lawrence Hospital Center before that) is a division of NewYork-Presbyterian Hospital, located in Bronxville, New York. It is a 288-bed general hospital providing inpatient and outpatient care primarily to residents of southern Westchester County. It is a designated Primary Stroke Center and a Level II Perinatal Center .

The hospital annually treats about 42,000 patients in its emergency department and delivers around 1,300 babies. It provides access to primary care physicians and specialists from ColumbiaDoctors, the faculty practice of Columbia University Medical Center, and NewYork-Presbyterian Medical Group Westchester, a multi-specialty physician practice.

== History ==
The hospital was founded in 1909 as Lawrence Hospital by prominent businessman William Van Duzer Lawrence, who recognized the need for a community hospital after his son fell ill with appendicitis and had to be transported to New York City.

In 2005, Lawrence Hospital Center became an affiliate member of the NewYork-Presbyterian Healthcare System, and in 2014 it entered into a formal partnership with NewYork-Presbyterian Hospital which resulted in the hospital being renamed NewYork-Presbyterian/Lawrence Hospital. Groundbreaking of a two-story, 40,000 sq. ft. cancer and surgery center occurred on June 18, 2013, whose construction cost $65 million. The center opened on November 21, 2016. The hospital was fully acquired by NewYork-Presbyterian Hospital in 2018.

== Services ==
NYP Westchester is a New York State Department of Health-designated Primary Stroke Center and Level 2 Perinatal Center. It is also home to a cancer center, maternity center, breast health center, two cardiac catheterization labs. It provides advanced services such as minimally invasive surgery, state-of-the-art orthopedic care and access to clinical trials.

== Accreditations and awards ==
NYP Westchester is licensed and certified for 288 beds by the New York State Department of Health. It is accredited by The Joint Commission for hospital and is certified in joint replacement of the hip and knee. The cancer program was given a Three-Year Approval with Commendation by the American College of Surgeons Commission on Cancer. Its hospital laboratory is accredited by the College of American Pathologists. It is also a recognized center of excellence in breast imaging.

In 2006, Lawrence Hospital was designated a New York State Stroke Center. The American Heart Association and American Stroke Association presented Lawrence Hospital with a Silver Get With the Guidelines - Heart Failure quality award in 2013. The hospital operates an echocardiographic laboratory accredited by the Intersocietal Commission for the Accreditation of Echocardiographic Laboratories, and runs the Weight Loss (Bariatric) Surgery Program which is recognized as a Comprehensive Center by Metabolic and Bariatric Surgery Center Network Accreditation and Quality Improvement Program (MBSAQIP).

== See also ==
- List of hospitals in New York
- Lists of hospitals in the United States
