= Bronxville Union Free School District =

School district in the U.S. state of New York

Bronxville Public Schools
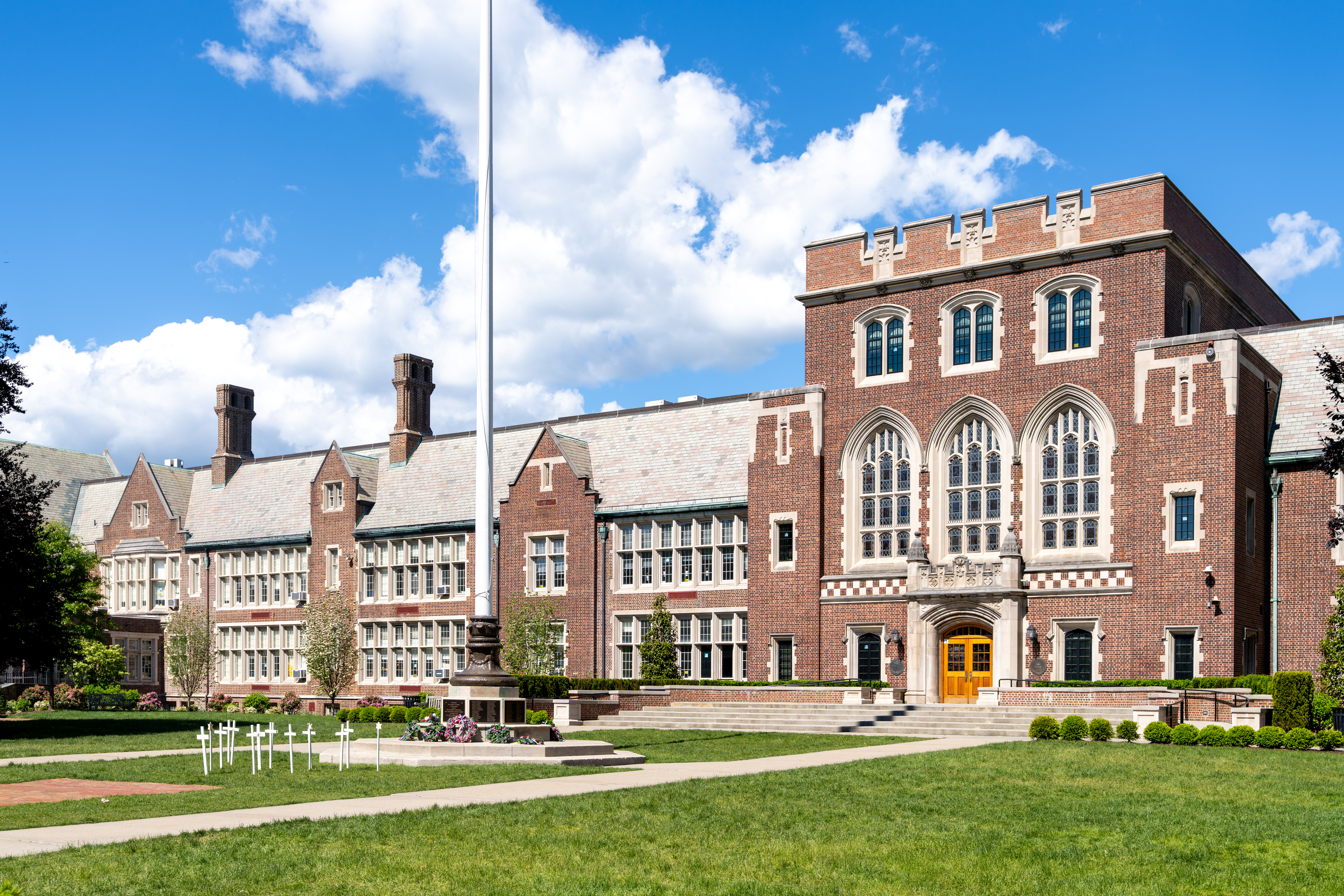

Address
- 177 Pondfield Road Bronxville, New York, 10708; United States

District information
- Type: Public high school
- Grades: K - 12
- Established: 1922

Students and staff
- Enrollment: Total K-12 1603 (as of 2023)
- Athletic conference: Section 1 (NYSPHSAA)
- District mascot: Bronco
- Colors: Blue and Gray

Other information
- Website: www.bronxvilleschool.org

Bronxville Union Free School District is a public school district serving the Village of Bronxville, Westchester County, New York. In 2023, 1603 students were enrolled across the district's elementary, middle and high schools. Bronxville High School was named the 10th best public high school in New York State for 2024.

== History ==
The first Bronxville Public School opened in 1870 in a one story frame building at about 80 Ponfield Rd., later the location of Woolworths and, since 1994, Value Drugs. The first principal and teacher was Grace Sandford (aka Mrs. Jared Sanford), who served for 23 years.

In 1908 the original frame building was replaced by a 10 room masonry structure, built at the same location, for US$22,000, half of which was contributed by Mr. and Mrs. Fred R. Chambers of Bronxville. The building served as a school until 1924, and was known as the 'yellow brick' school. Total enrollment at the school in 1908 was 150 students.

A "High School Department" was added in 1911, with the hiring of a single faculty member to teach high school subjects.

In 1921, the Bronxville School added an eleventh grade to what had previously been called a 'junior high school', with a twelfth grade added a year later. Prior to that, students were sent to Mount Vernon, Yonkers or New Rochelle high schools, or to private schools, to complete their secondary education. Attendance at the Bronxville school had increased from 373 in 1920 to 443 in 1921. The present campus buildings were first erected in 1925 as separate elementary school and high school buildings. Eighteen students graduated from the high school that year. The two buildings were joined together in 1930 with the erection of a central portion, including a library and assembly hall.

Attendance climbed as 41 students graduated from the High School in 1931, 69 in 1933, and 108 in 1937.

In 1961 the campus was expanded with eleven new classrooms, a gymnasium and a cafeteria, as well as a complete renovation of the auditorium. Total attendance for the 1961 school year was 1,250, including 360 in the junior high and 290 in the senior high. Enrollment reached 1,490 students in 1974. A major renovation was completed in 1989, adding 2,500 sq. ft. to the school, creating an elementary school library and renovating the middle/high school library and 50 classrooms, at a cost of $4.5M (USD)..

In 1934, Bronxville became one of the first public high schools in Westchester County to provide a continuous French language education for grades 7-12. It was added to the curriculum to promote the reading of the language and to allow students to feel achievement as they make progress in French. Since then, Spanish, Latin and Mandarin have also been added.

The teaching of advanced life sciences was added to the Bronxville School curriculum in hopes to teach students from kindergarten to high school how to think, ask questions, collect data, and come to conclusions. Students begin with basic concepts in elementary school, where they make observations. In middle and high school, students perform experiments in a laboratory setting where they can work in biology, chemistry, and physics classes up to the AP level. Bronxville was one of the first schools to establish a sex education program in the 1940s.

David Quattrone became the superintendent in 2005; he resigned in 2016. The district in 2016 had about 1,700 students, and in 2017 it had about 1,670 students. Roy Montesano, previously of the Hastings-on-Hudson school district, became the superintendent in 2017, and was replaced by Dr. Rachel Kelly after Montesano's retirement in January 2023. In the early 2000s, there was substantial construction and renovation which, at one point, generated some letters of protest from students.

== The community of Bronxville ==
Bronxville is a mile-square suburb north of New York City in Westchester County, New York. It was named after Swedish immigrant Jonas Bronck. The latitude is 40.938N; longitude is -73.832W. It is in the Eastern Standard Time zone. The estimated population (2003) was 6,515 according to census data. The median household income is over $200,000. It is located on the Bronx River. The town used to be called "Underhill's Crossing". It was developed by William Van Duzer Lawrence after 1889 who purchased farmland and zoned it with large lots for single-family houses but also apartment buildings and numerous rental townhouse complexes. Lawrence founded Sarah Lawrence College in 1928 in memory of his wife. The town attracted many artists and became known as an "artist's colony". The public library financed a major expansion in 2001 when it sold a painting for $4.1 million. The school is centrally located in the town across from the Dutch Reformed Church of Bronxville, diagonally opposite the town hall, and across from the Bronxville public library.

== School structure ==
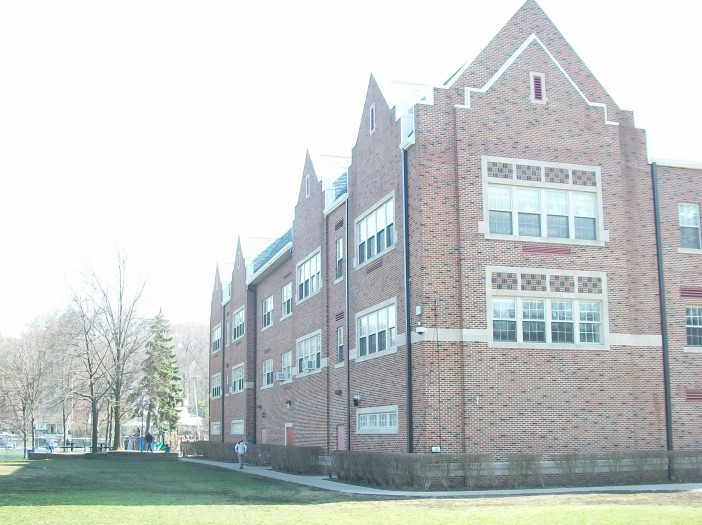
A new wing was added to accommodate increased enrollment.

The elementary school, middle school, and high school are located in one large building near the downtown. The campus, located on Pondfield Road, is located in a low point in the town; during particularly heavy rains in the past, the school has experienced flooding. There was a period when the school was closed for several weeks as a result of flooding. As a result, boilers and heating equipment have been moved to higher levels, and basement areas have been remodeled with moisture resistant substances in case the building is flooded again.

== Staff ==
In 2023, the superintendent of schools is Dr. Rachel Kelly, and the assistant superintendent is Dr. Mary Koetke. The high school principal is Ann Meyer, the assistant high-school principal is Connor Mitchell. The middle school principal is Joe Mercora. The principal of the elementary school is Rakiya Adams; the assistant principal is Anthony Vaglica. As of 2023, there are 1,603 students at Bronxville. A limited number of out-of-district students can enroll in Bronxville High School at a yearly tuition determined by New York State and enacted by the Board of Education.

== Foundation ==
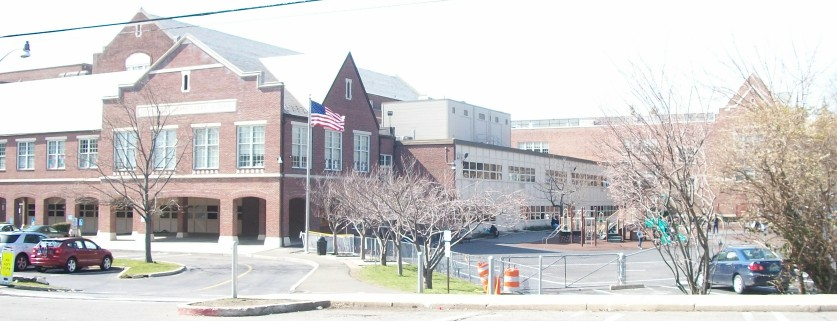
View from Midland Avenue.

The school has a foundation, created in 1991, which solicits donations from community members, alumni, corporations and others to raise monies for special programs to provide new equipment, programs, curriculum innovations, teacher training and tools. Since 1991, and as of 2023, the foundation has made grants totaling $12 million of support; 2021-2022 donations were at least $483,000, according to information from the foundation.

== Rankings and reputation ==
As of 2023, the high school consistently ranks in the top 50 best high schools in the country by Newsweek and in the top 100 by US News. In 1991, Bronxville high school was one of two schools singled out by President George H. W. Bush as a "school of excellence." In 2000 Bronxville High School was ranked the 5th best high school in the country by Newsweek. In 2012 Bronxville High School was ranked 2nd among "open enrollment" high schools in the country. In 2015 the district was ranked 29th in the country by Newsweek magazine. In 2000, every one of the high school's 79 graduates went on to higher education. In 2014, Bronxville Elementary School was named a Reward School for "high performance" by the New York State Department of Education. In 2023, Niche named the high school 19th in New York State in the 2024 Best Public High Schools ranking. Niche also named Bronxville as 10th out of 1,233 for best public school teachers in these rankings.

In terms of college preparation, Bronxville is ranked 15th in New York State for college preparedness and 112 nationally according to U.S. News education rankings. The graduation rate is 99%. The average SAT score was a 1,380 out of 1,600 and the average ACT score was 31 out of 36 in 2023.

The high school offers 29 advanced placement courses. In 2023, 93% of students were enrolled in such courses. For the class of 2023, 86% of students who took AP exams passed the exams with a score of 3 or higher. Bronxville High School had 6 National Merit semi-finalists and 27 AP Scholars in 2023.

After high school, graduates go off to attend universities such as Boston University, New York University, Georgetown University, Wake Forest University, as well as Ivy-League schools.

== Arts programs ==
Bronxville School District has a strong music program. In 3rd grade, students study the recorder, then in 4th grade, each student chooses a musical instrument to study. In middle school, students may choose band, chorus or orchestra. Music instruction is given three times per six-day cycle and grades are given. The Middle and High School Bands and Orchestras compete yearly in the NYSSMA competition. In 2014, 2016, and 2017, the High School Orchestra won Gold with Distinction for level VI at NYSSMA Majors. In 2014 the Middle School Orchestra won Silver.

Bronxville School District also has a performing arts program, which, under the direction of Peter Royal, presents two high school plays per year; a dramatical in the fall and a musical in the spring. Past performances include Urinetown, The Sound of Music, The Diary of Anne Frank and the Heidi Chronicles. Every other year, the High School Drama Department takes performers to the Edinburgh Fringe Festival to perform.

== Athletic programs ==
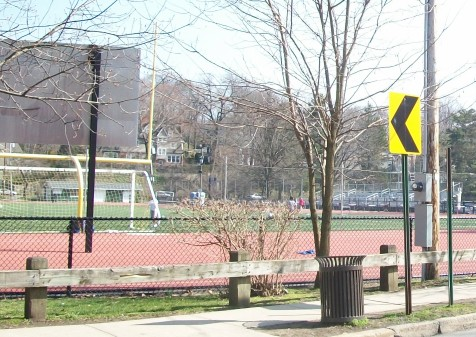
Athletic field

There are athletic programs for football, basketball, baseball, field hockey, track, cross-country, lacrosse, mountain biking, and other sports. Bronxville High School's teams plays other public high schools including Valhalla High School, Dobbs Ferry High School, Albertus Magnus High School, Croton-Harmon High School, Rye Neck High School, Edgemont High School, and private schools such as Iona Preparatory School, Fordham Preparatory School, and The School of the Holy Child.

Bronxville athletics offers three levels of sports: modified, junior varsity and varsity. At the modified level, athletes can experience a new sport and learn the basics of the sport at a less competitive level. At the junior varsity and varsity levels, competition is higher and the athlete can prepare for college-level sports. The vast array of levels allows for more inclusivity by enabling students of all athletic backgrounds to play sports.

Bronxville also has a reputation for its lacrosse program. The girls varsity team won the 2022 New York State championship. In June 2023, the girls lost to Skaneateles High School in the final round of the championship.

The athletic facilities consist of two major athletic fields including a football turf field with bleachers, as well as another turf field next to it. There are four indoor gymnasiums, one of which includes a rope course.

== Notable alumni ==
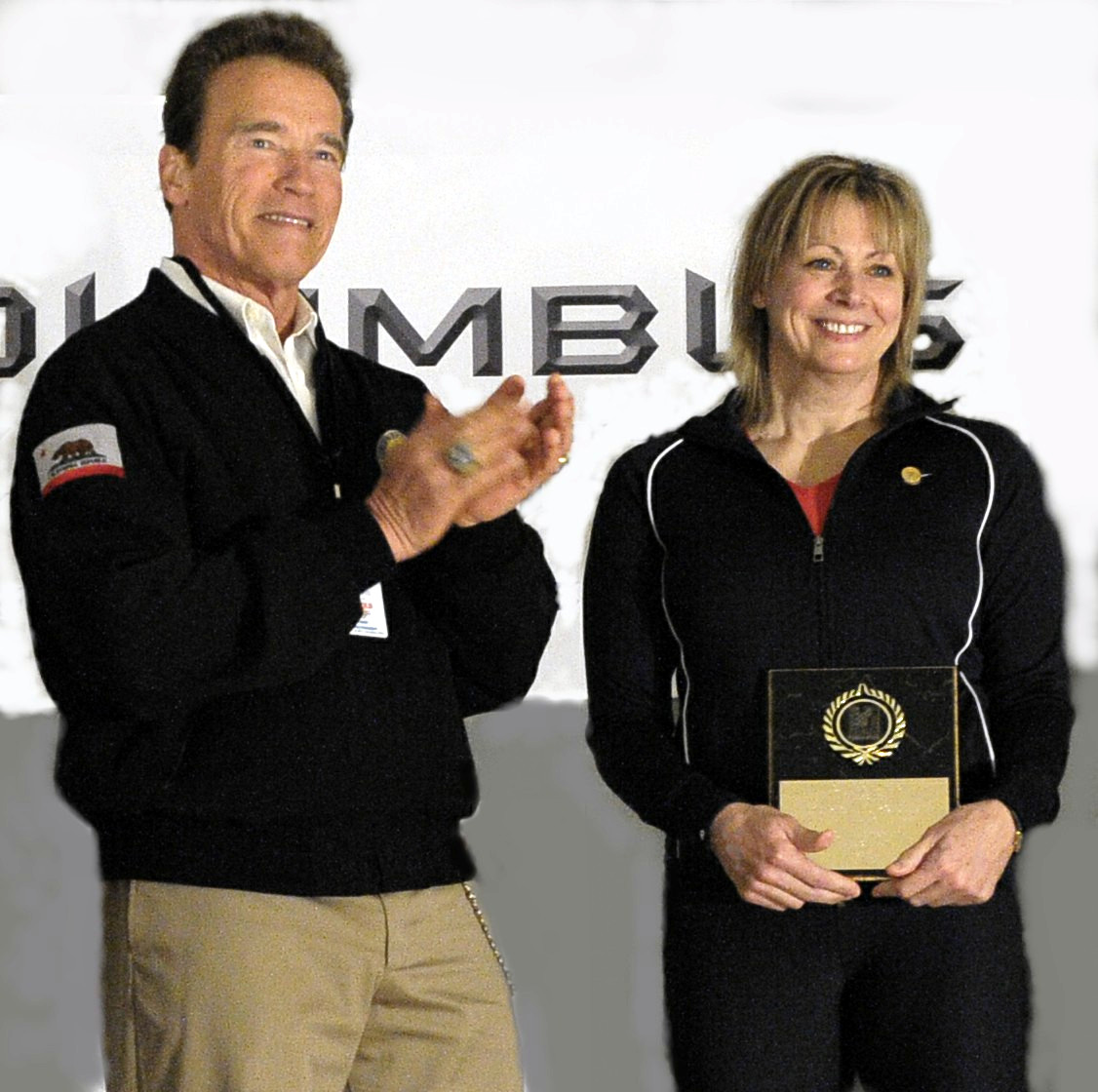
Bronxville student Karyn Marshall, class of 1974, became the women's world weightlifting champion in 1987 and was inducted in the USA Weightlifting Hall of Fame in 2011; with Arnold Schwarzenegger.

- Jeanne Darst, writer, graduated 1986.
- Chris Baio, bassist in American indie-rock band Vampire Weekend.
- Adam Bertocci, writer and filmmaker, graduated 2001.
- Mary Cain, runner
- Roger Goodell, NFL Commissioner
- Karyn Marshall, world champion women's weight lifter in 1987, graduated 1974.
- Gary Robinson, software engineer developed anti-spam mathematical algorithms.
- Lis Smith, political consultant
