= Bronxville, New York =

Village in Westchester County, New York, United States

- Village
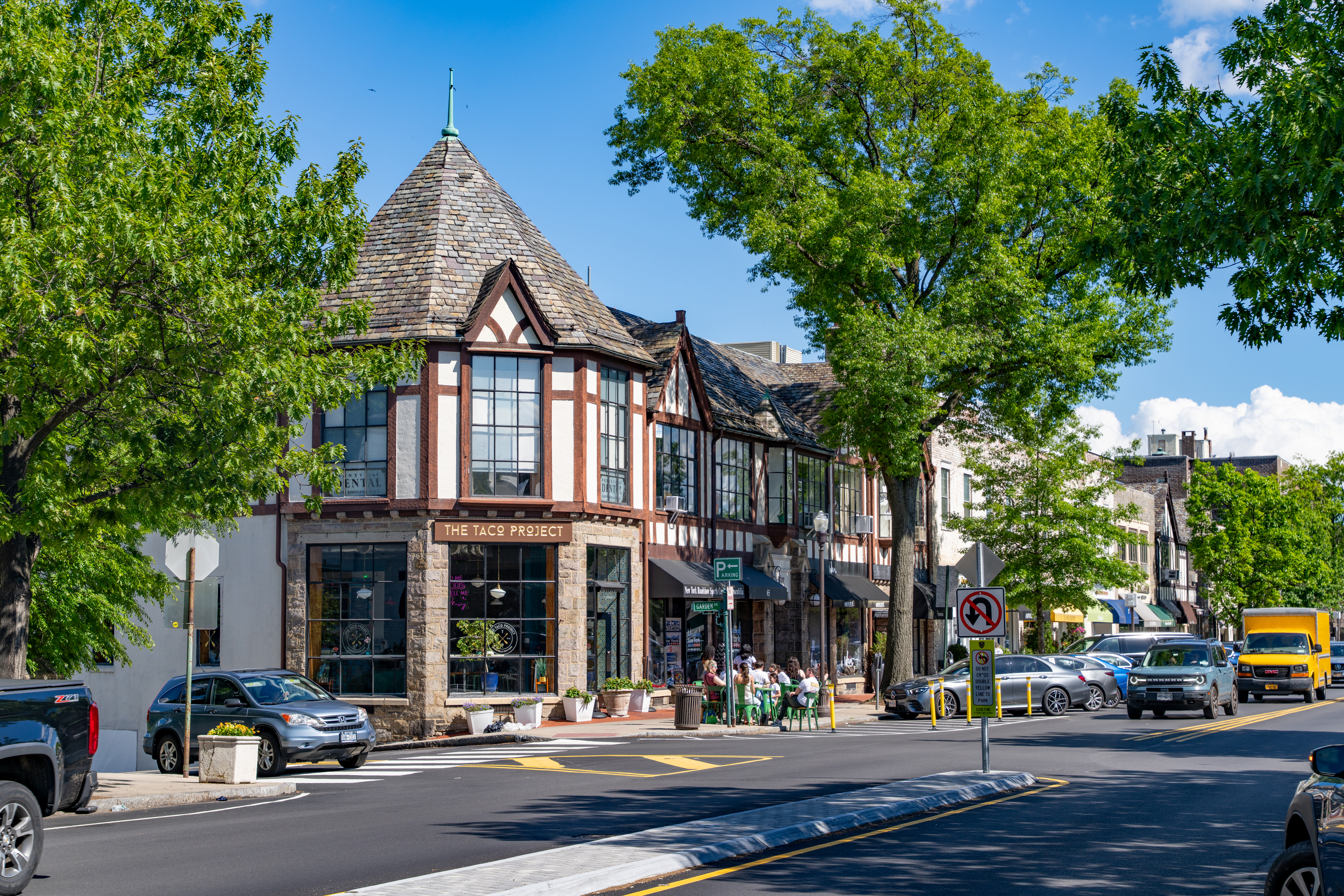
- Downtown Bronxville, 2025

- Seal Wordmark

- Location of Bronxville, New York
- Coordinates: 40°56′24″N 73°49′34″W
- Country: United States
- State: New York
- County: Westchester
- Town: Eastchester
- Settled: 1666
- Incorporated: 1898

Government
  - Mayor: Mary C. Marvin (R)

Area
  - Total: 0.97 sq mi (2.52 km^{2})
  - Land: 0.97 sq mi (2.52 km^{2})
  - Water: 0 sq mi (0.00 km^{2})
- Elevation: 92 ft (28 m)

Population (2020)
  - Total: 6,656
  - Density: 6,844.5/sq mi (2,642.69/km^{2})
- Time zone: UTC−5 (Eastern (EST))
  - Summer (DST): UTC−4 (EDT)
- ZIP Code: 10708
- Area code: 914
- FIPS code: 36-08532
- GNIS feature ID: 0944824
- Website: villageofbronxville.gov

Bronxville is a village in Westchester County, New York, United States, located approximately 15 miles (24 km) north of Midtown Manhattan. It is part of the town of Eastchester. The village comprises one square mile (2.5 km^{2}) of land in its entirety, approximately 20% of the town of Eastchester. As of the 2020 U.S. census, Bronxville had a population of 6,656.

== History ==
The region that includes the contemporary village of Bronxville was deeded to British colonists in 1666, but first settled by Europeans in the early 18th century. The two founding inhabitants were the Underhill and Morgan families. The Underhills built a sawmill and a gristmill, which was the first factory in the area, on the Bronx River. After they built a wooden bridge, the area became known as Underhill's Crossing.

Millionaire real-estate and pharmaceutical mogul William Van Duzer Lawrence sparked the development of Bronxville as an affluent suburb of New York City by building grand homes in a rustic setting. The area became "Bronxville" when the village was formally established. The population grew in the second half of the 19th century when railroads enabled commuters from Westchester County to work in New York City. Lawrence's influence can be seen throughout the community, including the historic Lawrence Park neighborhood, the Houlihan Lawrence Real Estate Corporation, and NewYork-Presbyterian Westchester, formerly named Lawrence Hospital.

The village was home to an arts colony in the early 20th century, when many noteworthy houses were built by prominent and casual architects. After the Bronx River Parkway was completed in 1925, the village expanded rapidly with the construction of several apartment buildings and townhouses, many of them built by the Lawrence family. As of 1959, the family continued to own or manage 97% of the rental market.

The Gramatan Hotel on Sunset Hill was a residence hotel in the late 19th century and early 20th century. Gramatan was the name of the chief of the local Siwanoy Indian tribe that was centered in the Gramatan Rock area above Bronxville Station. Chief Gramatan sold the land to the settlers. The hotel was demolished in 1972, and a complex of townhouses was built on the site in 1980.

Elizabeth Clift Bacon, General George Armstrong Custer's widow, lived in Bronxville, and her house still stands to this day.

St. Joseph's Catholic Church, located in the downtown area, was attended by the Kennedys when they were residents from 1929 to about 1938 before moving to London; Edward Kennedy returned to St. Joseph's in 1958 for his wedding to Joan Bennett. Two years later, in the 1960 Presidential Election voters in the Village overwhelmingly chose Richard Nixon over Edward's brother, John, by a 5-to-1 margin.

The US Post Office–Bronxville was listed on the National Register of Historic Places in 1988. Other sites on the National Register are the Bronxville Women's Club, Lawrence Park Historic District, and Masterton-Dusenberry House.

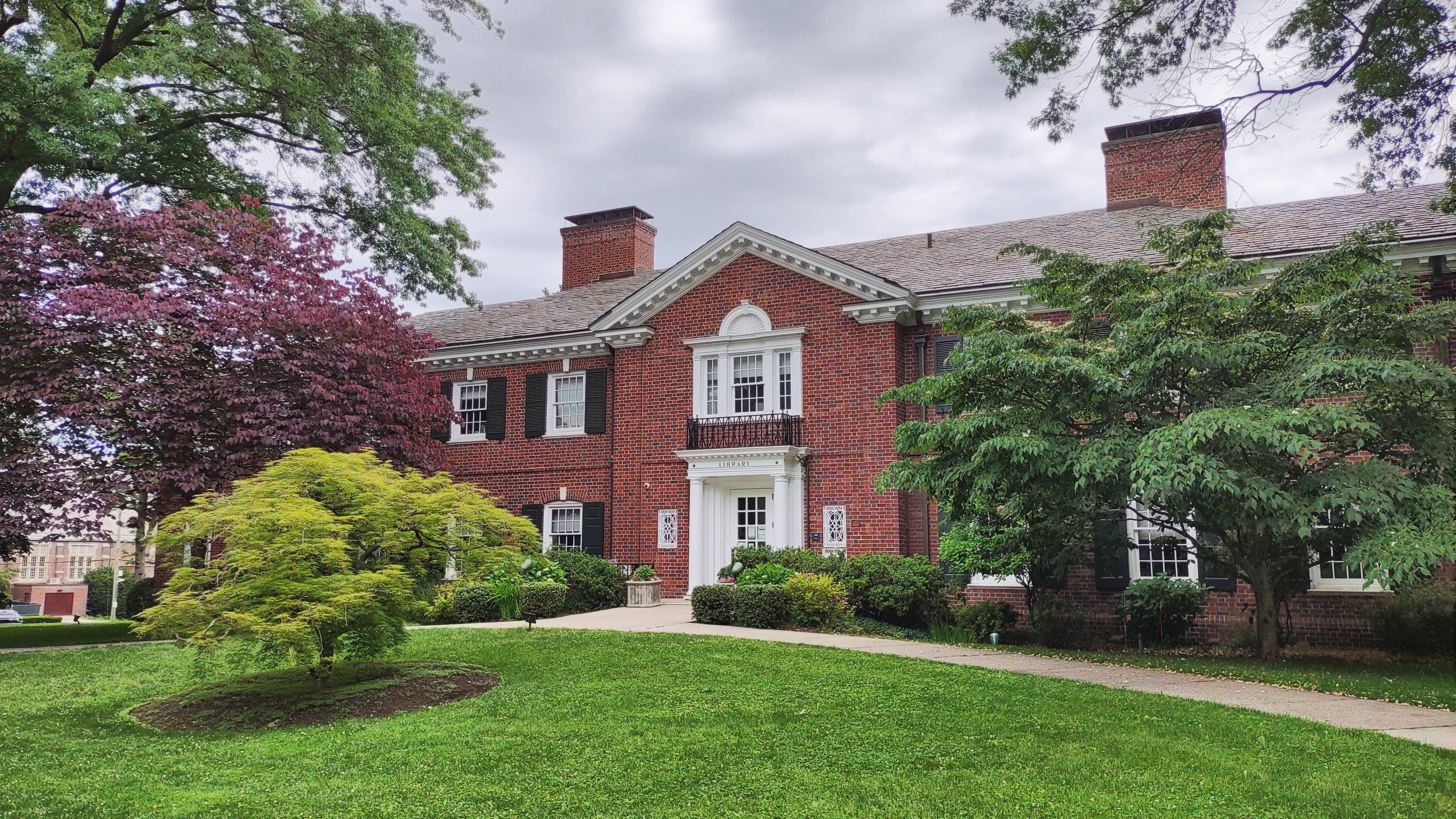
Bronxville Public Library in 2021

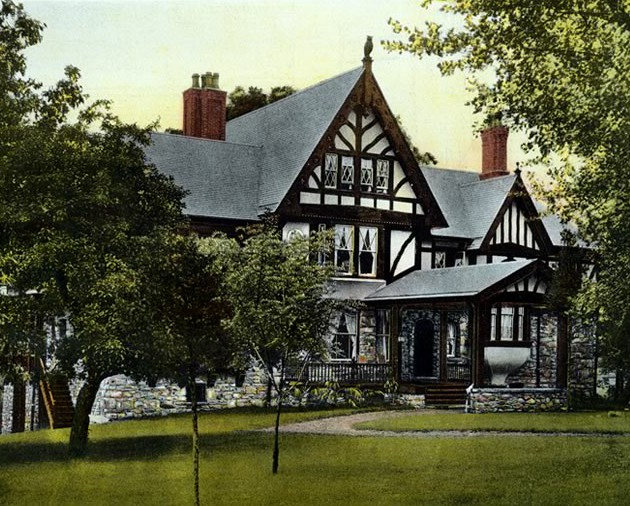
"Owl House" in the Gramatan Hill section of Bronxville (1898)

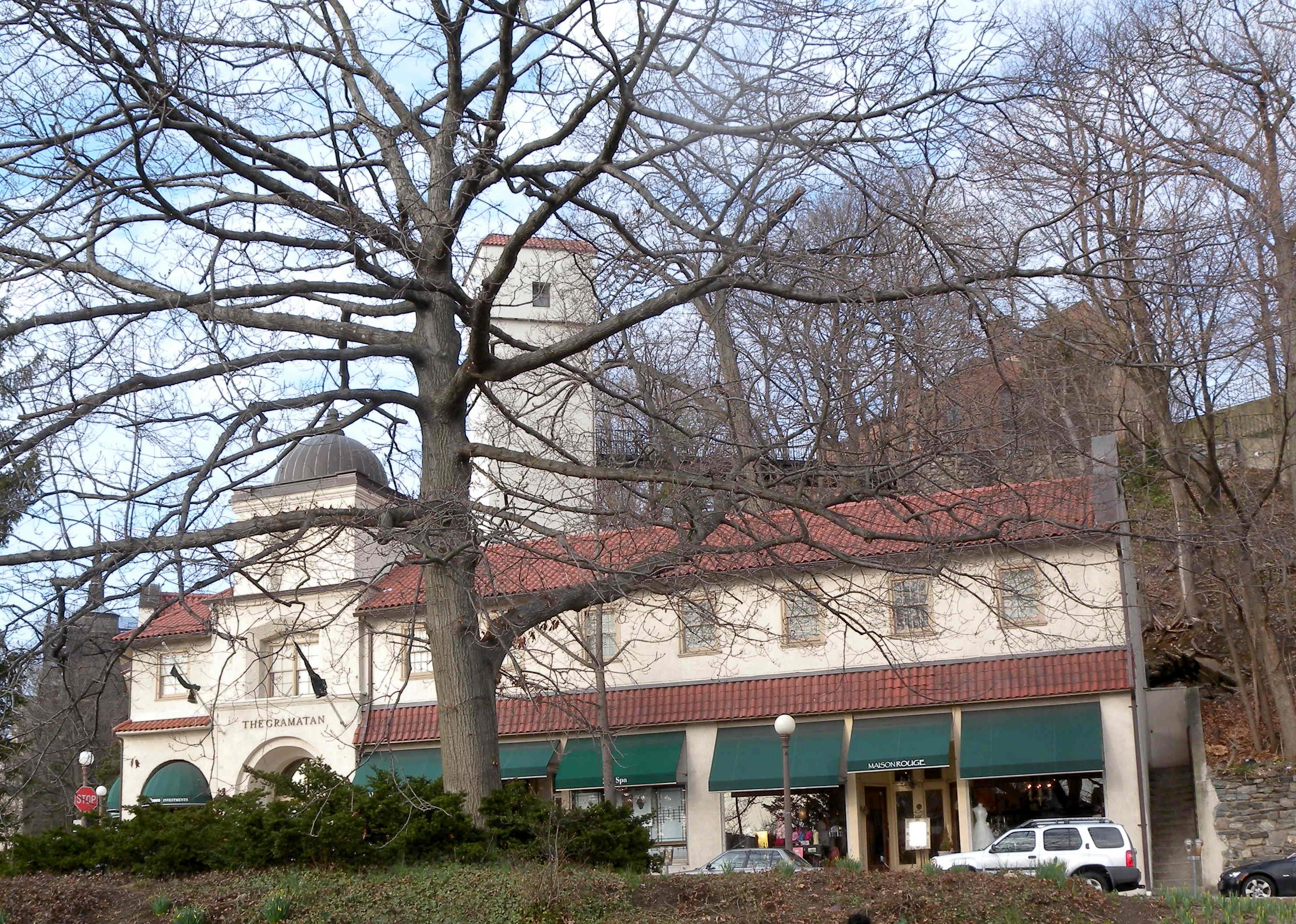
Gramatan Hotel

== Demographics ==
Historical population
Census	Pop.	Note	%±
1880	395		—
1900	579		—
1910	1,863		221.8%
1920	3,055		64.0%
1930	6,387		109.1%
1940	6,888		7.8%
1950	6,778		−1.6%
1960	6,744		−0.5%
1970	6,674		−1.0%
1980	6,267		−6.1%
1990	6,028		−3.8%
2000	6,543		8.5%
2010	6,323		−3.4%
2020	6,656		5.3%
U.S. Decennial Census

=== 2020 census ===
As of the 2020 census, Bronxville had a population of 6,656. The median age was 42.8 years. 29.8% of residents were under the age of 18 and 16.4% of residents were 65 years of age or older. For every 100 females there were 91.0 males, and for every 100 females age 18 and over there were 84.2 males age 18 and over.

100.0% of residents lived in urban areas, while 0.0% lived in rural areas.

There were 2,347 households in Bronxville, of which 43.5% had children under the age of 18 living in them. Of all households, 62.3% were married-couple households, 10.7% were households with a male householder and no spouse or partner present, and 24.4% were households with a female householder and no spouse or partner present. About 23.2% of all households were made up of individuals and 13.2% had someone living alone who was 65 years of age or older.

There were 2,505 housing units, of which 6.3% were vacant. The homeowner vacancy rate was 2.0% and the rental vacancy rate was 4.8%.

Racial composition as of the 2020 census
Race	Number	Percent
White	5,406	81.2%
Black or African American	41	0.6%
American Indian and Alaska Native	4	0.1%
Asian	519	7.8%
Native Hawaiian and Other Pacific Islander	2	0.0%
Some other race	105	1.6%
Two or more races	579	8.7%
Hispanic or Latino (of any race)	387	5.8%

=== 2000 census ===
As of 2000, there were 2,387 housing units, at an average density of 2,506.0 per square mile (967.6/km^{2}).

There were 2,312 households, of which 40.8% had children under the age of 18 living with them, 64.4% were married couples living together, 6.2% had a female householder with no husband present, and 28.2% were non-families. In the village, 24.3% of all households were made up of individuals, and 11.4% had someone living alone who was 65 years of age or older. The average household size was 2.71, and the average family size was 3.27.

Age distribution was 29.1% under the age of 18, 7.3% from 18 to 24, 25.9% from 25 to 44, 25.6% from 45 to 64, and 12.2% 65 or older. The median age was 38 years. For every 100 females, there were 86.7 males. For every 100 females age 18 and over, there were 82.1 males.

=== Demographic estimates ===
According to 2023 data from the U.S Census Bureau, the median household income in Bronxville was $215,726, and the per-capita income was $146,308.

The median value of owner-occupied housing units was $1,137,700. The median gross rent from 2019-2023 was $3,355.

== Postal code ==
Bronxville's 10708 ZIP Code covers the village of Bronxville proper, plus Chester Heights and other sections of Eastchester, parts of Tuckahoe, and Lawrence Park West, Cedar Knolls, Armour Villa, and other sections of Yonkers. These areas are collectively known as "Bronxville P.O." This brings the ZIP Code's population to 22,411 (2000 census), covering an area more than twice as large as the municipality of Bronxville itself and encompassing several institutions, including Sarah Lawrence College. Many of the residential properties located within Bronxville PO are within walking distance of Bronxville's downtown, but are within the municipal boundaries of the City of Yonkers.

== Education ==
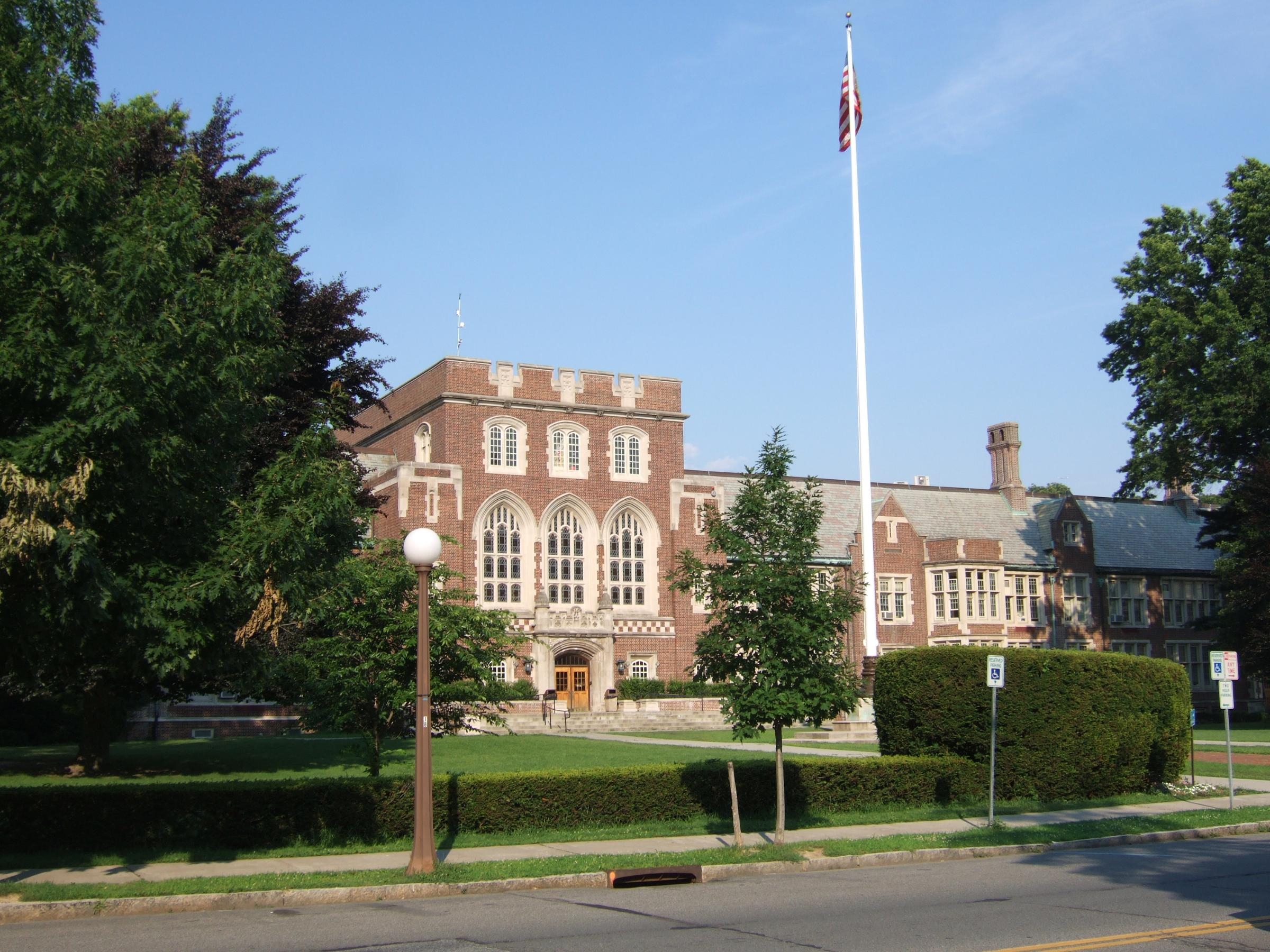
The Bronxville School

Bronxville was home to Concordia College, a liberal arts college operated by the Lutheran Church–Missouri Synod. The college was shuttered on January 28, 2021, following financial difficulties accelerated by the COVID-19 pandemic. The campus was purchased by Iona University that same year, and turned into the university's school of health sciences. Adjacent to the Concordia College campus is the Chapel School—a pre-K-8 school affiliated with the Lutheran Church-Missouri Synod, which came to national attention for holding a mock slave auction in 2019.

The Bronxville Public School is known as The Bronxville School. The school was started as a progressive educational institution in 1922.

St. Joseph School is a Catholic parochial school run by St. Joseph's Church. It was established in 1951, and schools children from kindergarten through eighth grade.

== Parks and recreation ==
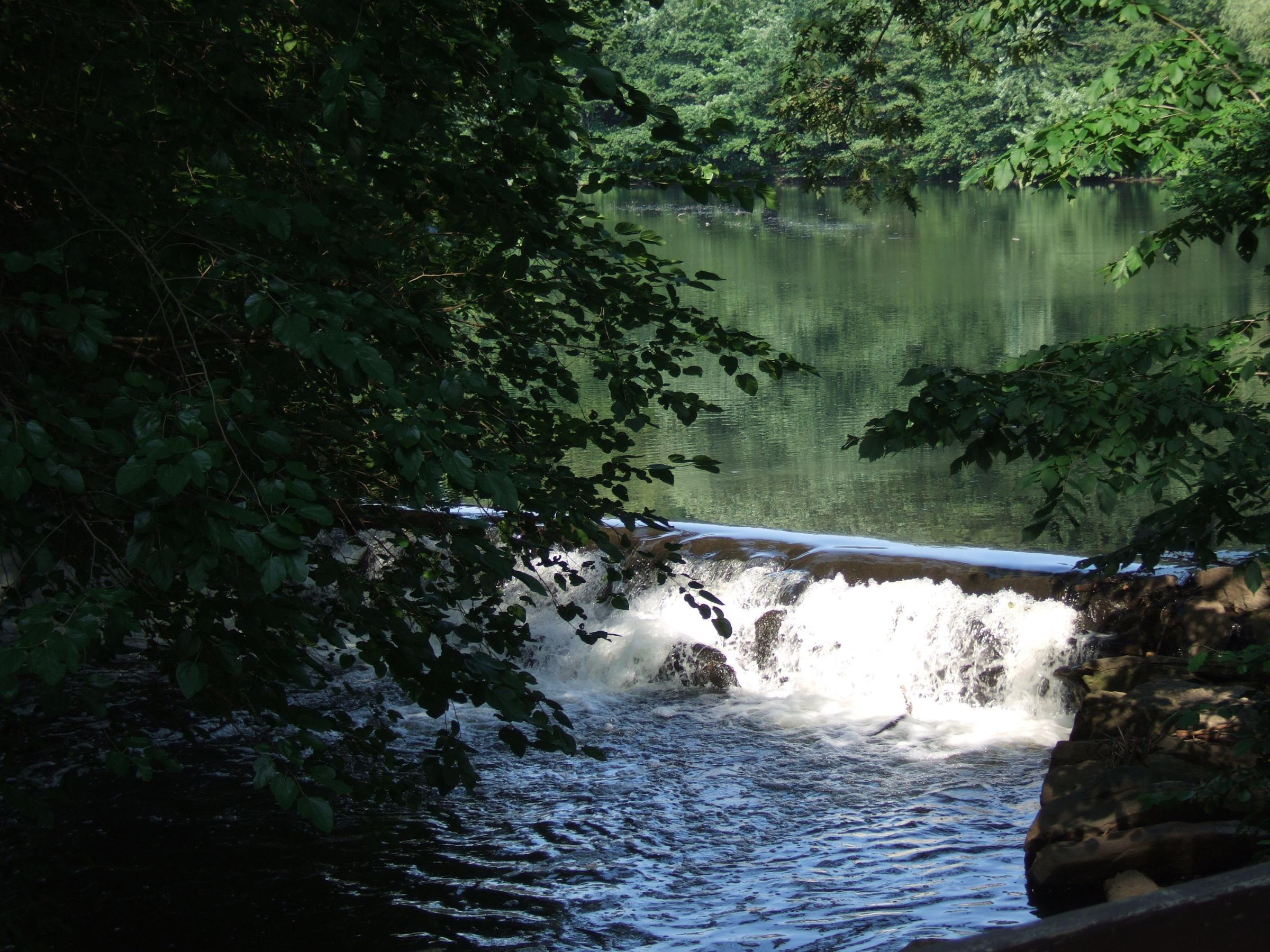
The Bronx River

The Village of Bronxville has more than 70 acres (280,000 m^{2}) of parkland including athletic fields, woodlands, and a very small part of the Bronx River Parkway Reservation. The Reservation, Westchester’s oldest park, was created as an adjunct to the Bronx River Parkway that opened in 1925, and was the first linear park in the United States. The Reservation features ponds, wooden footbridges and hundreds of varieties of native trees and shrubs. The park is owned by Westchester County, and it is a favorite place for bicycling, walking, running, and nature study. It is sometimes referred to by locals as the "Duck Pond".

The Bronxville School's athletic fields contain a football field, three smaller fields used for various sports like field hockey and lacrosse, and a running track (which is only 380 meters in Lane 1 because of space issues). Bacon Woodlands, located on Kensington Road, is a natural rock outcropping which has been left in its natural state, the flatter portion of which is used as an informal play area by children. Scout Field, a Westchester County Park which is located predominantly in Yonkers and Mount Vernon but is controlled by Bronxville, is heavily utilized by the Bronxville schools' soccer, football, baseball, and cross-country running programs. In 2006, Chambers Field was replaced with turf, which was funded by the community and parents of athletes in Bronxville.

== Notable people ==
- Frank Abagnale, Jr. (born 1948), security consultant and former impostor/forger, subject of the book Catch Me if You Can and its 2002 film adaptation
- Roy Chapman Andrews (1884–1960), explorer for the American Museum of Natural History
- Harriet Hubbard Ayer (1849–1903), pioneer of the women’s cosmetics industry
- Kenneth Bacon (1944–2009), Department of Defense spokesman who later served as president of Refugees International
- Harrison Bader (born 1994), Major League Baseball outfielder for the Philadelphia Phillies, and previously for the Minnesota Twins, New York Mets, St. Louis Cardinals, New York Yankees, and Cincinnati Reds.
- Chris Baio (born 1984), musician
- Clarence Barnhart (1900–1993), lexicographer, noted for the Thorndike-Barnhart school dictionary series.
- Andrew Brooks (1969–2021), associate research professor at Rutgers University and immunologist, who was the developer of the first FDA-approved rapid saliva test for COVID-19 diagnosis.
- Henry Billings Brown, US Supreme Court justice, died at the Gramatan Hotel in 1913.
- Felicia Bond (born 1954), author and illustrator of children's books
- Marvin Bower, former managing director of McKinsey & Co.
- Mika Brzezinski, television journalist on Morning Joe
- Thomas S. Buechner (1936–2010), founding director of the Corning Museum of Glass and director of the Brooklyn Museum
- William J. Burns, founder of the Burns Detective Agency, and director of the FBI’s predecessor organization
- Mary Cain (born 1996), middle distance runner
- Dick Clark, host of American Bandstand
- Juanin Clay de Zalduondo, actress
- Janet Cox-Rearick, art historian
- Elizabeth Custer, widow of General George Armstrong Custer
- Jeanne Darst, writer, Fiction Ruined My Family
- Don DeLillo, writer
- Gabriella DeGasperis, golfer and social media personality better known as Gabby Golf Girl
- Lawrence Dutton, musician
- Francis William Edmonds (1806–63), genre painter
- Michelle Ekizian, composer
- Ford C. Frick, National League President - The third Major League Commissioner of Baseball
- Timothy Geithner, owned a home in Bronxville before his appointment as treasury secretary in 2009.
- Brendan Gill, New Yorker writer
- Michael Gates Gill, author of How Starbucks Saved My Life: A Son of Privilege Learns to Live Like Everyone Else
- Roger Goodell, commissioner of the National Football League
- Don Herbert (1917-2007), television host
- John Hoyt, actor
- Rose Kennedy, Kennedy family matriarch
- Joseph P. Kennedy, Kennedy family patriarch. Ambassador to Great Britain and 1st Chairman of the Securities and Exchange Commission
- Robert F. Kennedy, 64th attorney general and U.S. senator from New York
- Ted Kennedy, U.S. senator from Massachusetts
- John F. Kennedy, 35th president of the United States of America, U.S. senator from Massachusetts
- Denison Kitchel, campaign manager for Barry M. Goldwater in 1964, was born in Bronxville in 1908.
- Lawrence Kohlberg, psychologist and developer of theories on stages of moral development.
- Steve Liesman, television reporter
- Jamie Loeb (born 1995), tennis player
- Patricia Lousada (1929–2019), American ballet dancer and cookbook author
- James Grover McDonald diplomat and first U.S. Ambassador to Israel
- Ginna Sulcer Marston, public service advertiser, attended Bronxville high school
- Ed McMahon, television host
- Jose Melis, musician and band leader for Jack Paar on The Tonight Show
- Jack Paar, radio and television talk show host
- Frank Patterson, Irish tenor
- Mark Patterson, investor
- Gretchen Peters, country singer/songwriter
- Peter Pennoyer, architect
- Eddie Rickenbacker, World War I fighter pilot, and later president of Eastern Airlines
- Dennis Ritchie, one of the creators of Unix and the C programming language
- Gary Robinson, software entrepreneur
- Ron Rothstein (born 1942), NBA basketball coach and college basketball player
- Chuck Scarborough, news anchor
- William E. Schluter (1927-2018), politician who served in the New Jersey General Assembly and the New Jersey Senate.
- Tad Smith, CEO of Sotheby's
- Frederick D. Sulcer, advertising executive who wrote Put a Tiger in Your Tank for ExxonMobil
- Ruth Ann Swenson, operatic soprano
- Philip Torchio, electrical engineer with Edison Electric Company
- Charles J. Urstadt, real estate executive
- David Kenyon Webster, World War 2 soldier in Easy Company, the "Band of Brothers"
- Witold Woyda, Polish Olympic gold medalist fencer

== In popular culture ==
- The town in the setting for Jerome Kern's 1917 Broadway musical Love O' Mike.
- The Bronxville School appears in the films Firstborn (1984), starring Teri Garr and Peter Weller, and Stepmom (1998), starring Julia Roberts and Susan Sarandon.
- The Siwanoy Country Club, located in Eastchester, is featured in the films Six Degrees of Separation (1993), starring Will Smith, Stockard Channing, and Donald Sutherland and Rounders (1998), starring Matt Damon and Edward Norton.
- The film Baby Mama (2008) was shot partly on Legget Road in Bronxville.
- The opening scene in the film Tales from the Darkside (1990) was shot in Bronxville.
- A few scenes from the film Admission (2013) were filmed in Value Drugs and Womwraths in Bronxville
- In season 8, Episode 4 of the TV series Blue Bloods, DCPI Garrett Moore gets swatted at his home in Bronxville

== Image gallery ==
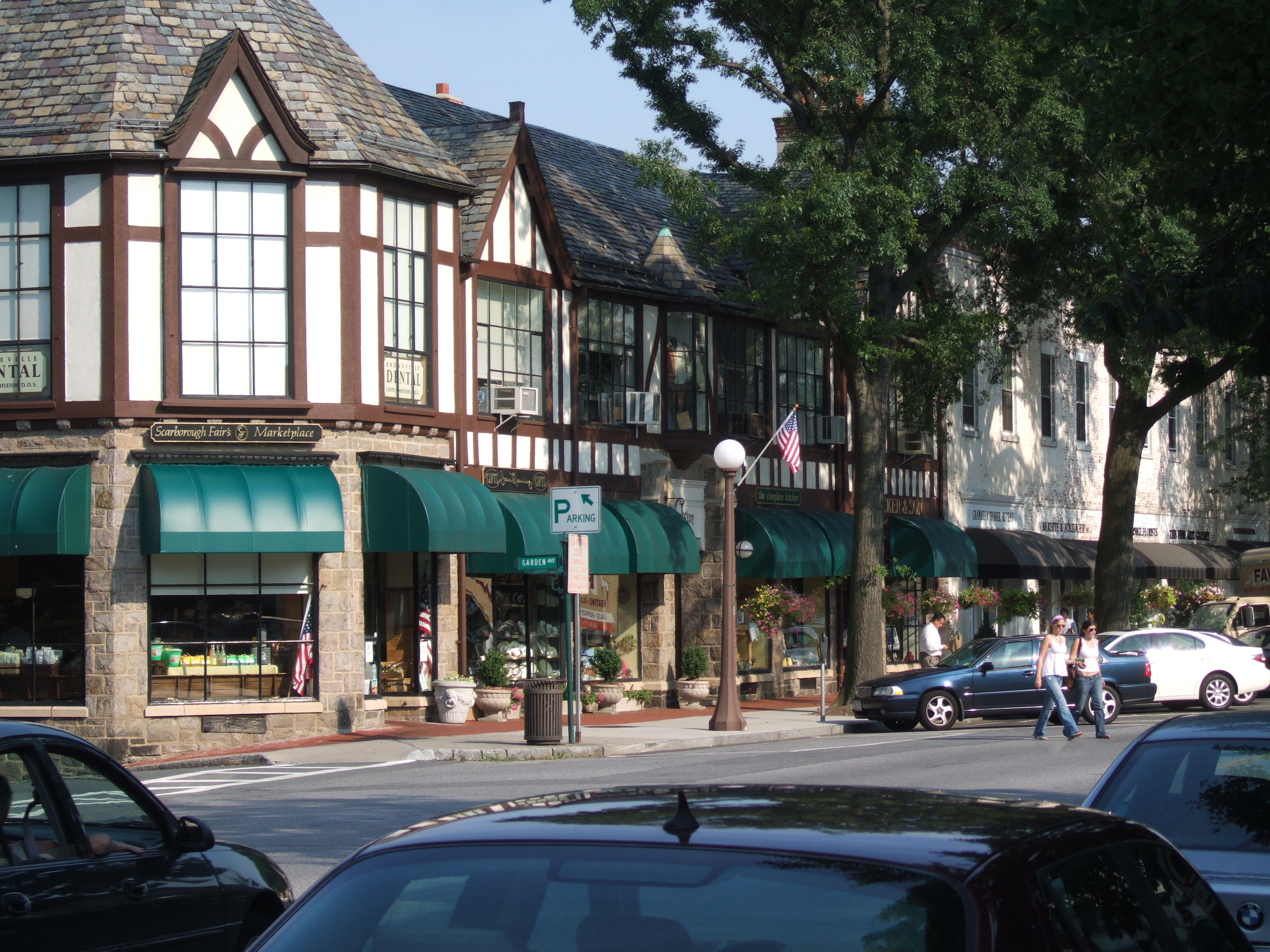
Bronxville's Downtown

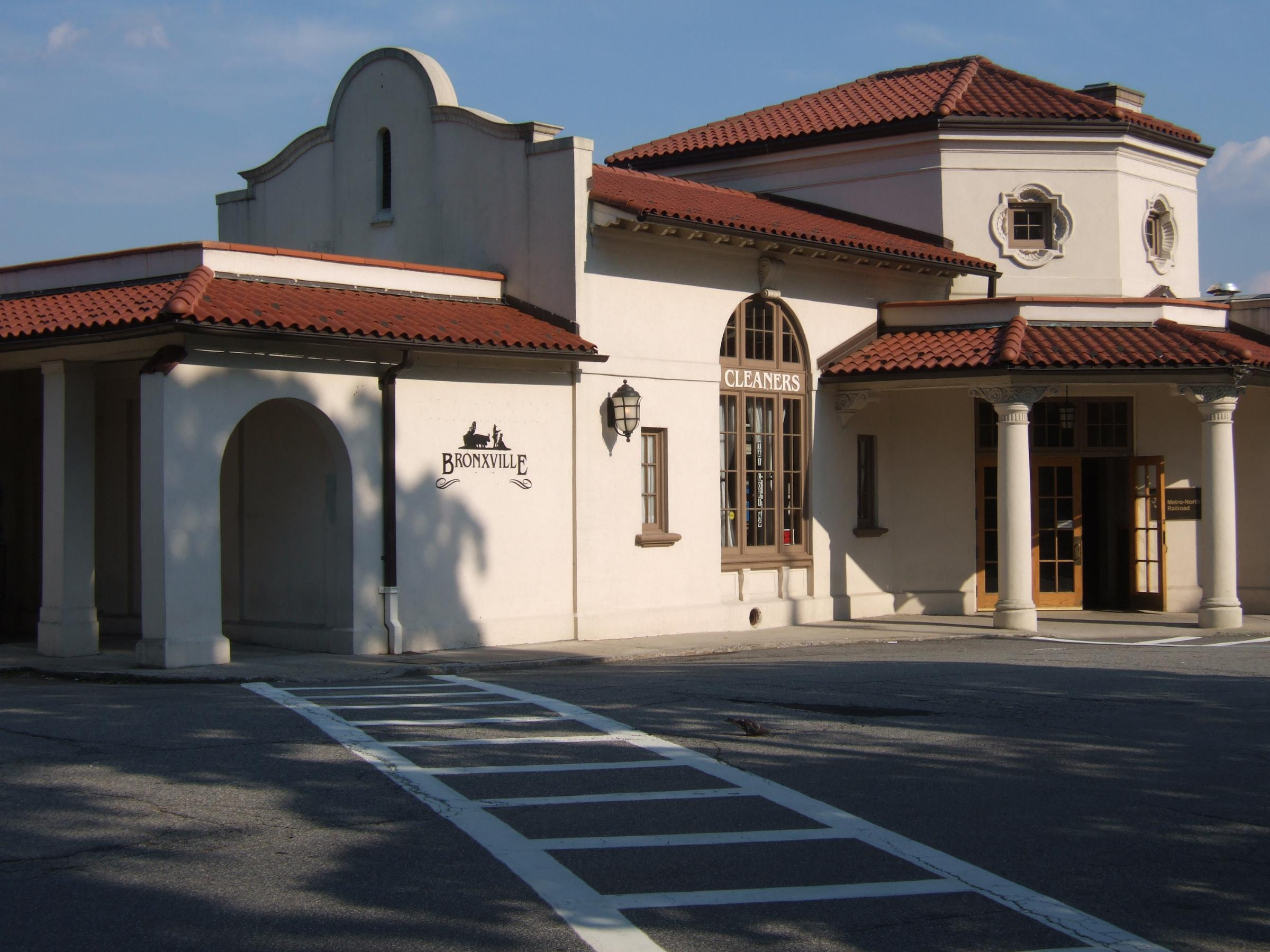
Bronxville Metro-North Train Station

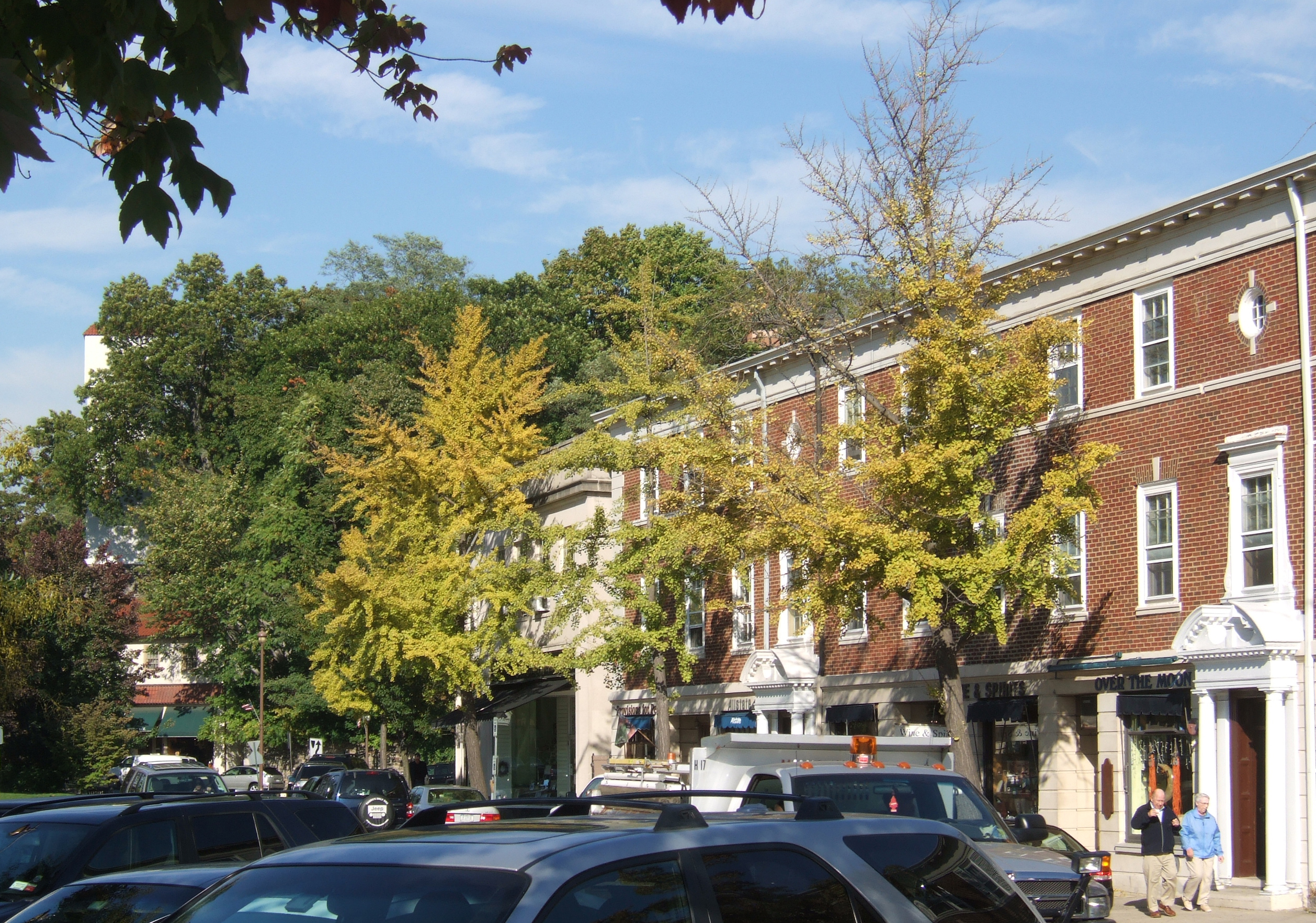
Kraft Avenue

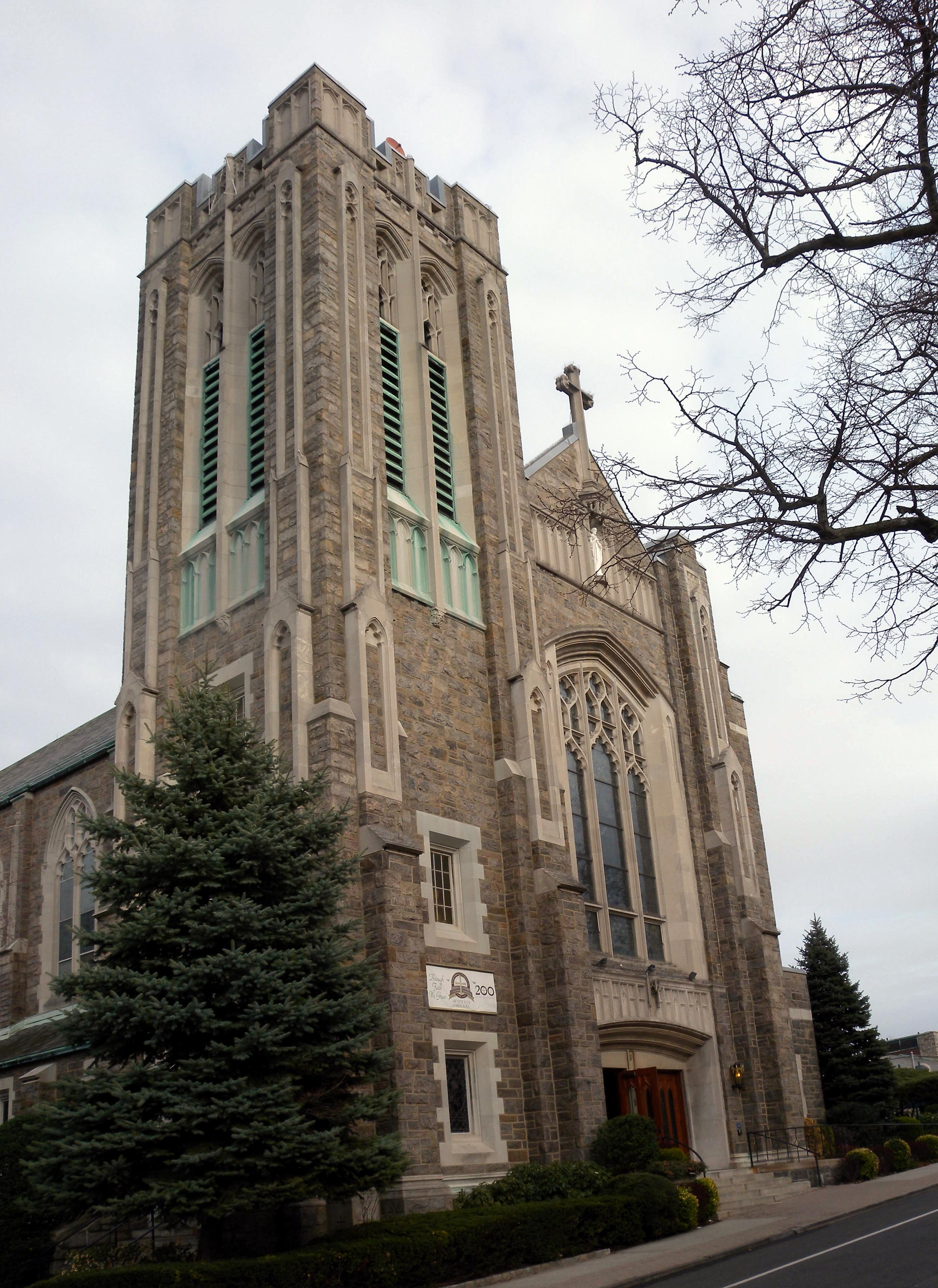
St. Joseph's Roman Catholic Church

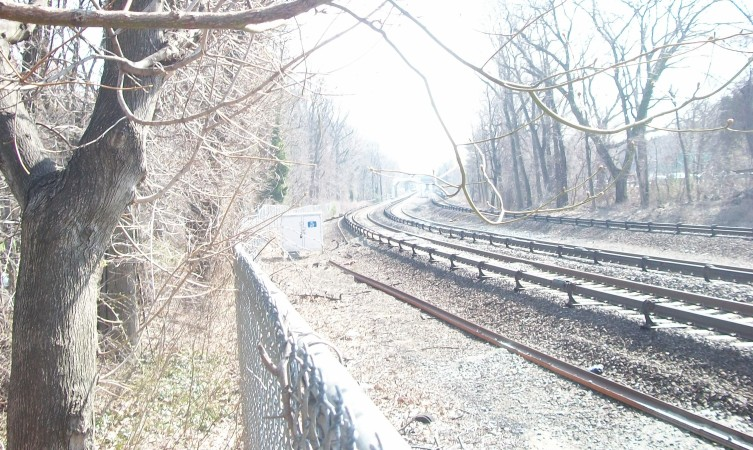
Train tracks

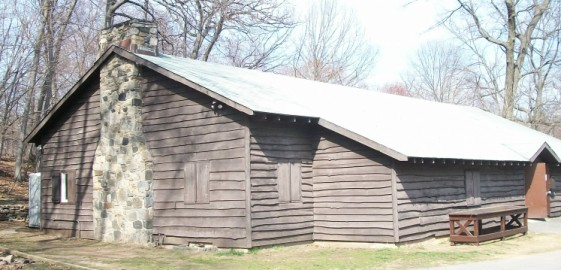
Boy Scout Cabin

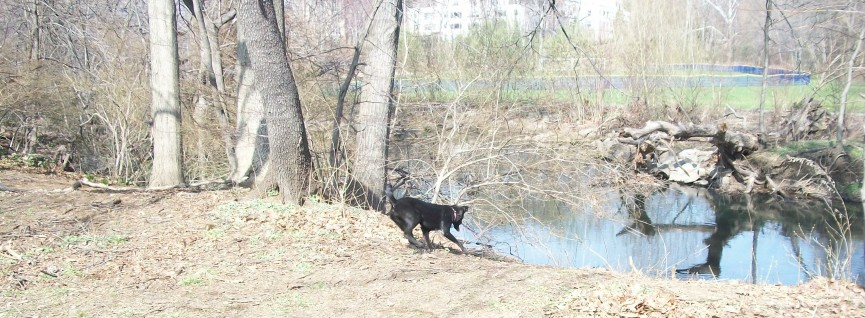
Park

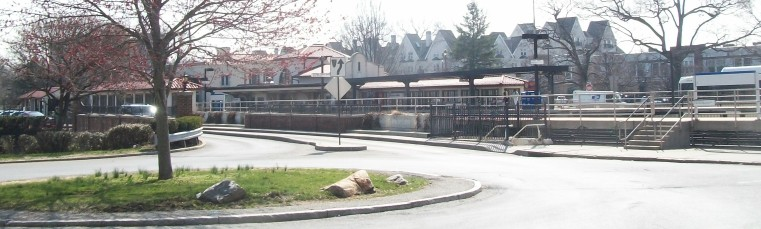
Commuter train station

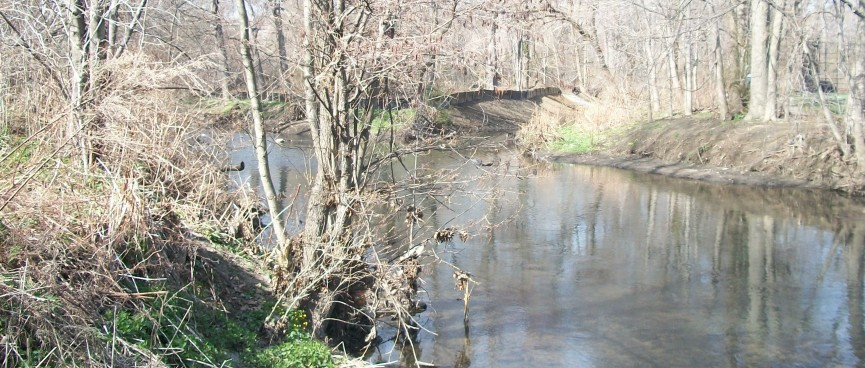
Bronx River

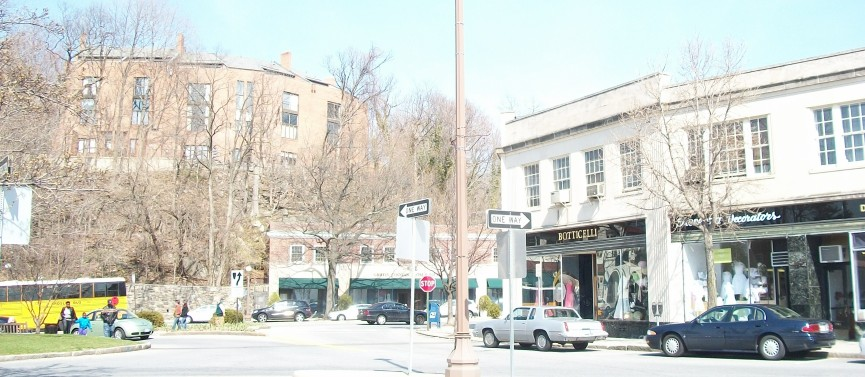
Downtown

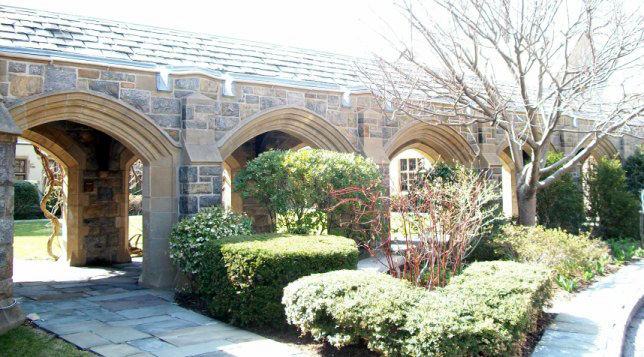
Reformed Church of Bronxville

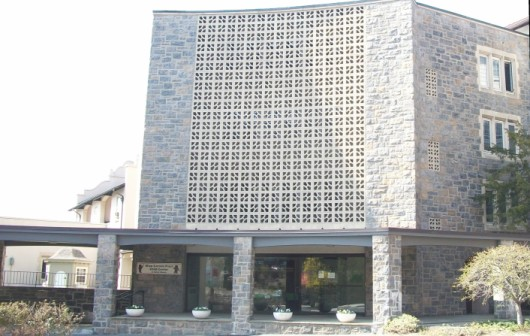
Christ Church

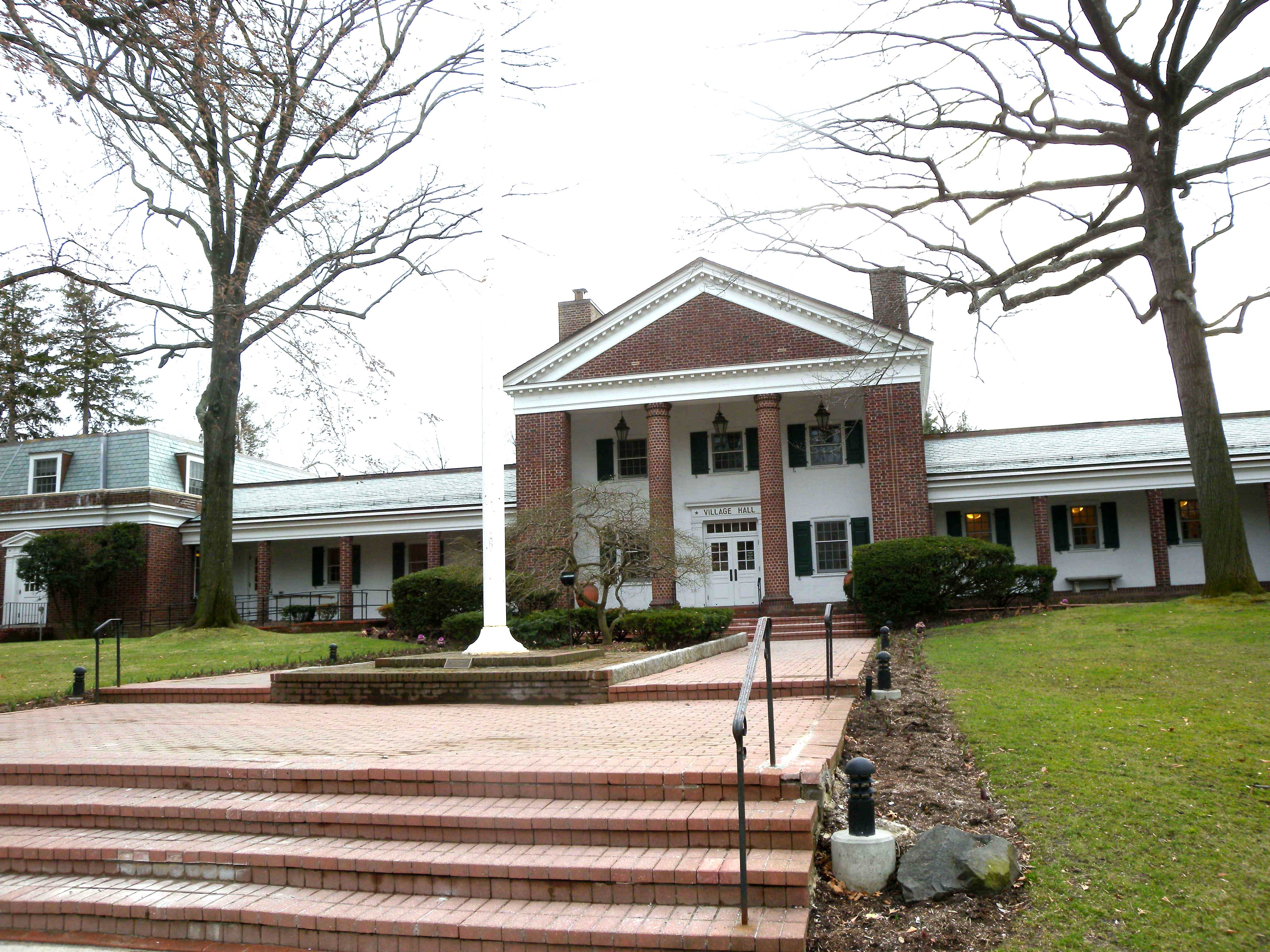
Village Hall

== See also ==
- Eastchester
- William Van Duzer Lawrence
- US Post Office–Bronxville
- Bronxville Women's Club
- Lawrence Park Historic District
- Masterton-Dusenberry House
- Bronxville Union Free School District
- NewYork-Presbyterian Westchester
