= Eastchester =

Eastchester may refer to:

- Eastchester (town), New York
- Eastchester, Bronx
- Eastchester (CDP), New York
- Eastchester High School
- Eastchester Bay
- East Chester, near Chester, Nova Scotia
- Eastchester Historical Society
- Eastchester Depot
- Eastchester–Dyre Avenue (IRT Dyre Avenue Line)
- East Chesterton
