= Doug Crane =

American animator (1935–2020)

- Born: June 15, 1935; Bronxville, New York, U.S.
- Died: December 17, 2020 (aged 85); Stuart, Florida, U.S.
- Education: The School of Visual Arts
- Occupation: Animator
- Years active: 1957–2007
- Notable work: He-Man and the Masters of the Universe; The Smurfs; Beavis and Butt-Head Do America; Heavy Metal

Douglas P. Crane (June 15, 1935 – December 17, 2020) was an American animator.

== Life and career ==
Crane was born on June 15, 1935, in Bronxville, New York. He was one of eight kids in his family. "Often, it could be pretty tough trying to get my two cents into a conversation around the dinner table, It dawned on me that I could get my point across and also vent my frustrations by drawing pictures, usually of myself with my cartoon mouth wide open with balloon blurbs saying stuff like, 'Bobby, Shut Up!' or, 'Betty, Be Quiet!'", he said in a 2012 interview.

After graduating from Eastchester High School in Eastchester, New York, he got a job at Terrytoons in 1957, which was located at New Rochelle, New York. He married his wife Maureen Hurley at the time.

Crane took a break from animating during the beginning of his animation career and went to the United States Army in 1958. During his time with the army, he became a cartoonist and created a comic strip that ran in the military newspaper called Tiptoe and Timber. Other things he did while in the army include illustrating recruitment pamphlets, creating and painting floats for base parades, and painting signage for the White Sands Proving Grounds.

After returning from the army, he came back to Terrytoons and opened the Hanna-Barbera East Studios in New York City alongside Red Auguston at the request of Hanna-Barbera co-founder William Hanna. Crane then went on to animate for films, television series, television commercials, and half-hour specials. He also drew comic strips and comic books.

Crane worked on Challenge of the Superfriends, The Smurfs, and Beavis and Butt-Head Do America, as well as one episode of the original television series, "Beavis and Butt-Head Are Dead".

He received a Clio Award and a National Television Commercials Award for his work on a Wall Street Journal commercial. He was also an animation professor at his alma mater, School of Visual Arts, formerly known as the Cartoonist and Illustrators School, where he taught classical animation (Professor of Classical Animation) for 15 years. Crane was also invited to teach at the Institute of Animation and Film at the Academy of Art and Design, Tsinghua University in Beijing, China.

Crane also spent time as the Artist In Residence at the Thornton-Donovan School in New Rochelle. He also served the Westchester County residents as an Auxiliary police officer, a Grand Knight at the New Rochelle Knights of Columbus, and as the Municipal Arts Commissioner, where he planned and carried out the weekend-long 40th Anniversary celebration for Terrytoons in February 1982.

Crane died of cancer at age 85 on December 17, 2020, in Stuart, Florida.

== Filmography ==
Year	Title	Notes
1957	Flebus	Inker
1957	It's a Living	Ink & Paint Artist
1957	The Juggler of Our Lady	Inker
1958	Dustcap Doormat	Ink and Paint
1962	Peanut Battle	Animator
1962	The Adventures of Lariat Sam	Animator
1962	Where There's Smoke	Animator
1962	Riverboat Mission	Animator
1962	Rebel Trouble	Animator
1963	The Mighty Hercules	Animator, 1 episode
1963	The Deputy Dawg Show	Animator, 92 episodes
1966	Mighty Thor	Animator, 13 episodes
1967	Alter Egoist	Animator
1967	Clean Sweep	Animator
1967	Brother Bat	Animator
1967	A Bridge Grows in Brooklyn	Animator
1967	The Opera Caper	Animator
1967	Keep the Cool, Baby	Animator
1967	Marvin Digs	Animator
1967	The Fuz	Animator
1967	The Bickersons	Animator
1967	Mouse Trek	Animator
1967	Mini-Squirts	Animator
1968-1970	Spider-Man	Animator, 32 episodes
1975	Really Rosie	Animator
1975	Chicken Soup with Rice	Animator
1977	Raggedy Ann & Andy: A Musical Adventure	Animator, Sea and Ships sequence
1977	King of the Beasts	Animator, credited as Douglas Crane
1977	I Am the Greatest: The Adventures of Muhammad Ali	Animator
1978	Challenge of the Superfriends	Animator, 16 episodes
1978-1979	Godzilla	Animator, 19 episodes
1979	The New Misadventures of Ichabod Crane	Animator
1980	Gnomes	Animator
1981	Heavy Metal	Animator; Segments: "Den" and Harry Canyon"; credited as Douglas Crane
1981	Super Friends	Animator, 2 episodes
1981	Trollkins	Animator, 13 episodes
1981	The Smurfs	Animator, 26 episodes
1983	The Care Bears in the Land Without Feelings	Animator
1983-1985	He-Man and the Masters of the Universe	Animator, 114 episodes
1985	He-Man and She-Ra: The Secret of the Sword	Animator
1985	Fat Albert and the Cosby Kids	Animator, 2 episodes
1985	She-Ra: Princess of Power	Animator, 65 episodes
1985	He-Man & She-Ra: A Christmas Special	Animator
1987	Pinocchio and the Emperor of the Night	Animator
1987-1988	BraveStarr	Animator, 65 episodes
1988	BraveStarr: The Movie	Animator
1990	Happily Ever After	Animator, credited as Douglas P. Crane
1990	The Nutcracker Prince	Additional animator
1991	The Pirates of Dark Water	Animator, 2 episodes
1992	Fish Police	Animator, 1 episode
1992	Benjamin the Elephant	Animator, 1 episode
1996	Beavis and Butt-Head Do America	Posing artist
1997	Beavis and Butt-Head	Layout artist, 1 episode, "Beavis and Butt-Head Are Dead"
1999	Downtown	Background designer and Layout artist, 2 episodes
2007	Chicago 10	Animator
