= George Zaffo =

American illustrator (1916–1984)

- Born: George John Zaffo; November 22, 1916; Bridgeport, Connecticut, U.S.
- Died: March 28, 1984 (aged 67); Tuckahoe, New York, U.S.
- Occupations: Illustrator; animator; writer
- Years active: 1937–1975
- Spouse: Dorothy Zaffo (m. 1932; died 1975) Sieglinde Zaffo (m. 1976–1984)
- Children: 4

George Zaffo (1916-1984) was an American illustrator and writer most well known for his picture books for children, including The Giant Nursery Book of Things That Go and Your Police.

== Biography ==
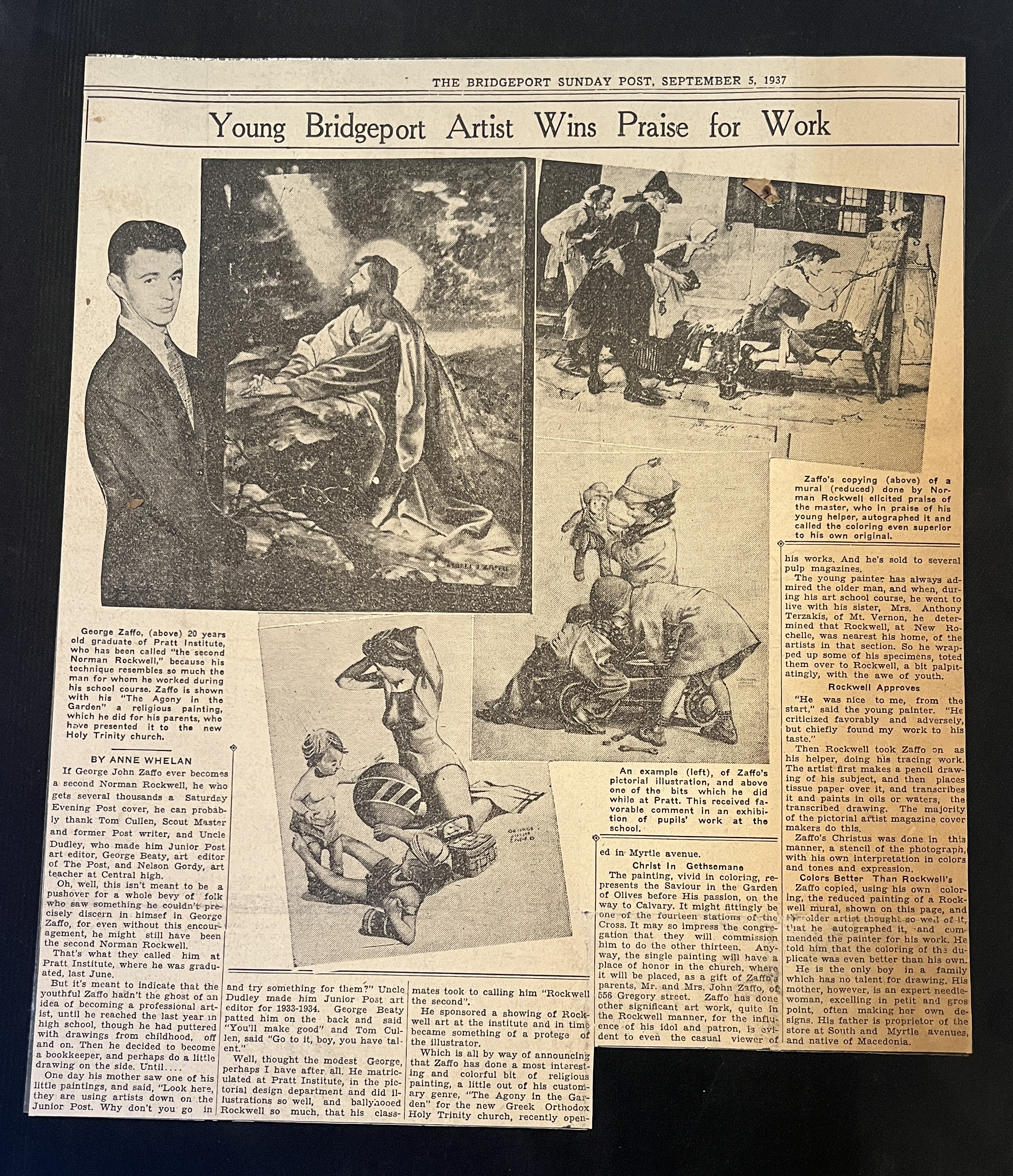
Newspaper clipping of article by Anne Whelan titled 'Young Bridgeport Artist Wins Praise for Work' published in the Bridgeport Sunday Post on 5 Sep 1937

George Zaffo grew up in Bridgeport, Connecticut and attended Pratt Institute from 1934-1937 graduating with a bachelor's in Illustration from the Pictoral Design Department.

Zaffo was inspired by the artwork of American artist Norman Rockwell. While attending Pratt, he sponsored a showing of Rockwell's work. Zaffo later became a tracer assistant to Rockwell during his schooling at Pratt.

After graduating, Zaffo became an opaquer and assistant animator for Paul Terry at Terrytoons in New Rochelle, New York before enlisting as a technical animator creating training videos for the United States Army Signal Corps for five years.

In 1949, he opened his own studio in Mount Vernon, New York creating educational films.

His most notable design work were the original stories and illustrations featuring detailed, realistic drawings of machinery. Most of his work were published between 1945 and 1972 by either Doubleday or Grosset & Dunlap, both of which are now owned by publisher Penguin Random House.

Zaffo died from cancer on March 28, 1984 in Tuckahoe, New York at the age of 67.

== Selected books ==
- Freddy and the Fire Engine (written by Laura Harris), 1945
- The Big Book of Real Trains, 1949
- The Big Book of Real Trucks, 1950
- The Big Book of Real Fire Engines, 1950
- The Big Book of Real Building and Wrecking Machines, 1951
- The Big Book of Real Airplanes, 1951
- The Big Book of Real Locomotives, 1951
- Your Police, 1956
- Building Your Super Highways, 1957
- Your Freight Trains, 1958
- The Giant Nursery Book of Things That Go, 1959
- The Giant Nursery Book of Travel Fun, 1965
- The Giant Nursery Book of Things That Work, 1967
- Airplanes and Trucks and Trains, Fire Engines, Boats and Ships and Building and Wrecking Machines, 1968
- The Giant Book of Things in Space, 1969
- The Big Book of Real Boats and Ships, 1972

== Legacy ==
First Lady Jacqueline Kennedy included two of Zaffo's books in the White House library for her children: Your Frieght Trains (1958) and The Giant Nursery Book of Things That Go (1959), both published by Doubleday.

New York police commissioner Bill Bratton shared an excerpt from Zaffo's book Your Police (1956) at the press conference announcing his new position as police commissioner. He credited the book with inspiring his childhood interest in police work. The book was published in 1956 after Zaffo collaborated with the NYPD to accurately depict police work and equipment.
