= Eastchester Union Free School District =

School district in the U.S. state of New York

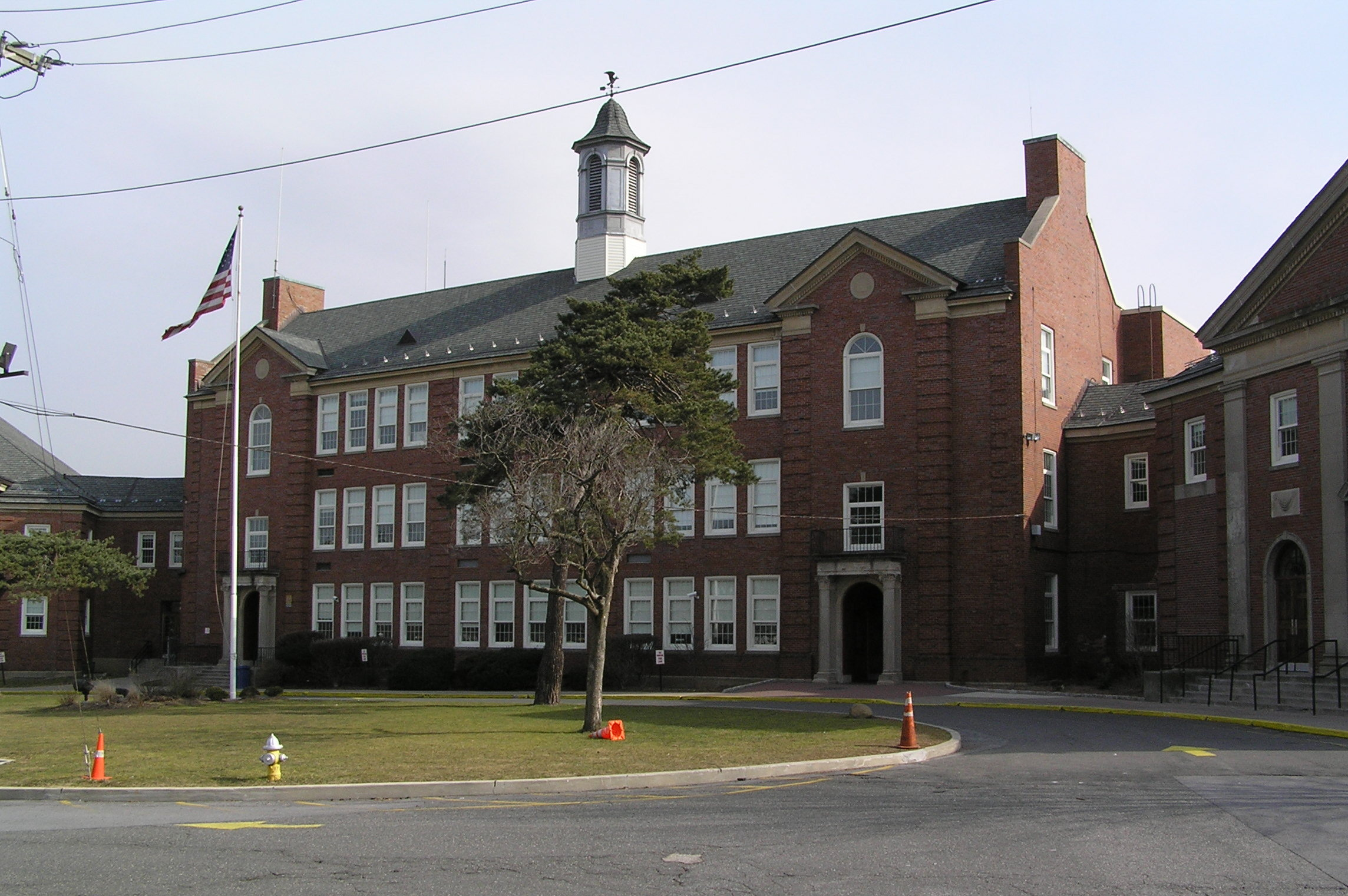
Eastchester High School

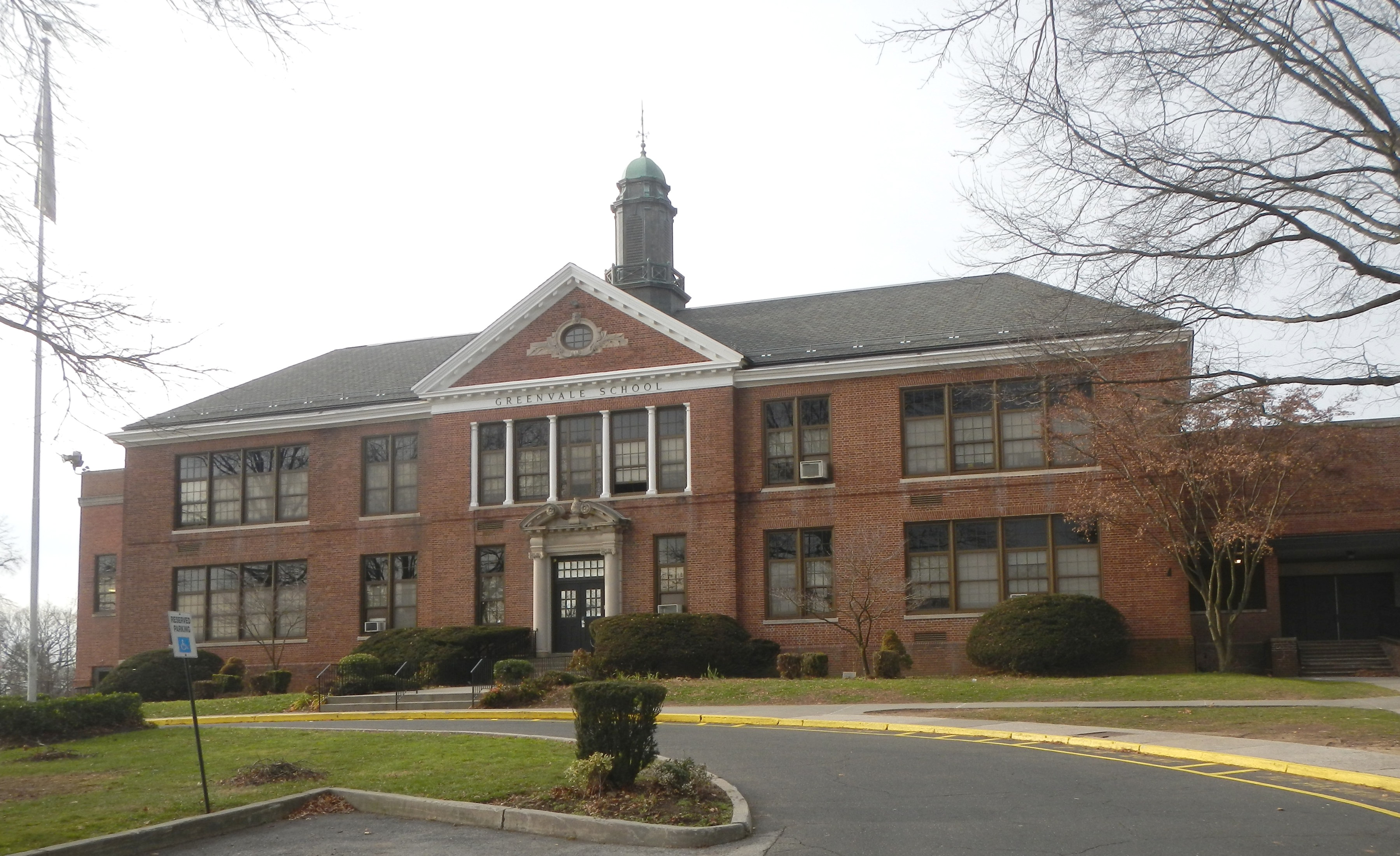
Greenvale Elementary

Eastchester Union Free School District is a school district headquartered in Eastchester, New York.

In 2013 Walter Moran became the superintendent. In the summer of 2018 he stated that he would retire. Robert Glass became the superintendent in 2019.

== Schools ==
Secondary

- Eastchester High School
- Eastchester Middle School

Primary

- Anne Hutchinson Elementary School (grades 2–5)
- Greenvale Elementary School (grades 2–5) - In 2015 Darrell Stinchcomb became the principal.
- Waverly School (K-1)
