= Eastchester (CDP), New York =

Eastchester, New York
- CDP
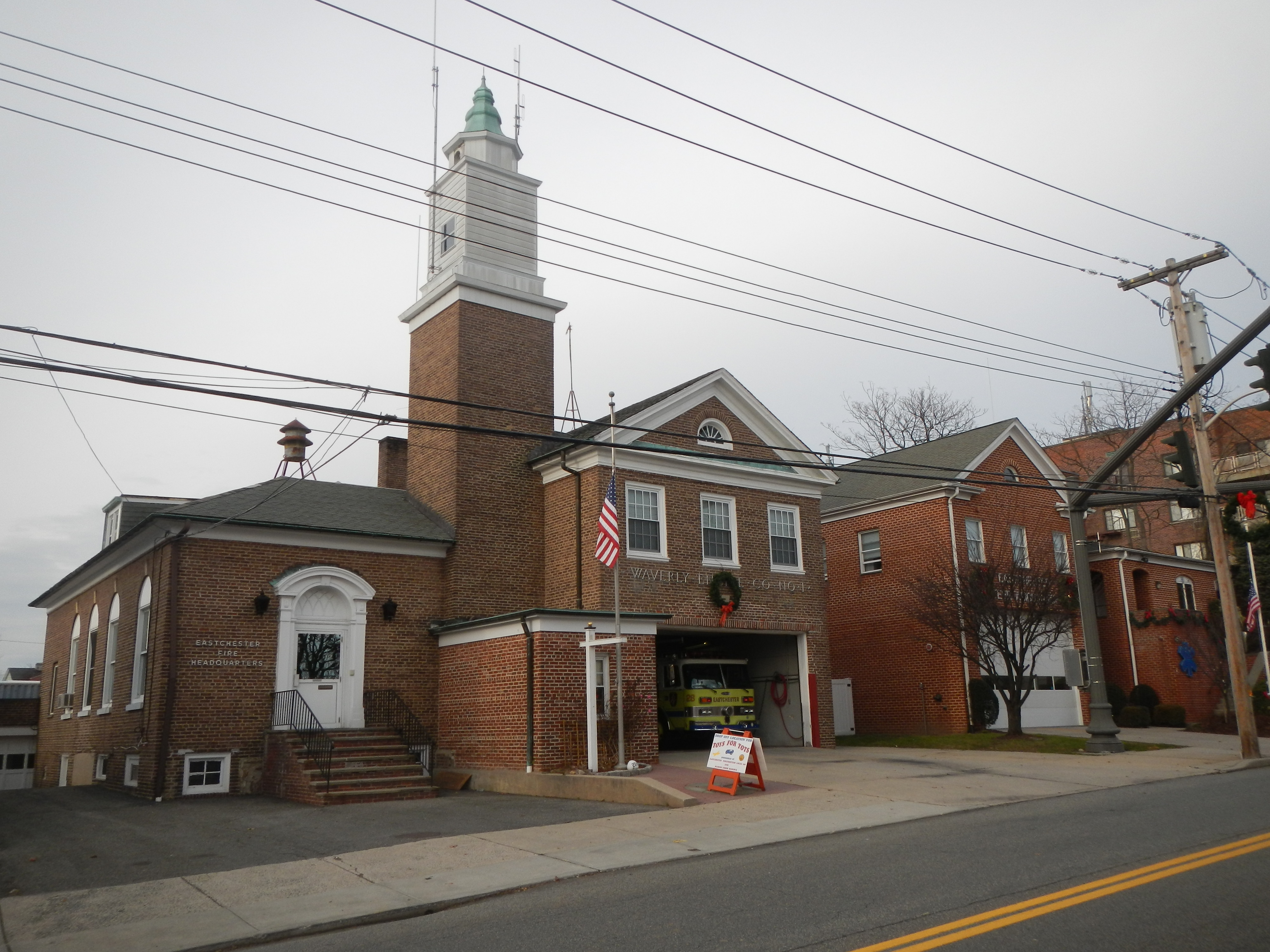
- Fire headquarters

- Location of Eastchester (CDP), New York
- Coordinates: 40°57′30″N 73°48′31″W
- Country: United States
- State: New York
- County: Westchester
- Town: Eastchester

Area
  - Total: 3.41 sq mi (8.84 km^{2})
  - Land: 3.30 sq mi (8.55 km^{2})
  - Water: 0.11 sq mi (0.29 km^{2})
- Elevation: 220 ft (67 m)

Population (2020)
  - Total: 20,901
  - Density: 6,332.2/sq mi (2,444.89/km^{2})
- Time zone: UTC-5 (Eastern (EST))
  - Summer (DST): UTC-4 (EDT)
- ZIP codes: 10707, 10709
- Area code: 914
- FIPS code: 36-21809
- GNIS feature ID: 0973324

Eastchester is a census-designated place (CDP) in Westchester County, New York, United States. The population was 19,554 at the 2010 census. The Eastchester CDP consists of the Town of Eastchester excluding the villages of Bronxville and Tuckahoe. Eastchester (CDP) contains one of the highest percentage of individuals that claim Italian ancestry in New York State and in the US at over 40.6% in 2020.

== Geography ==
According to the United States Census Bureau, the CDP has a total area of 3.5 square miles (9.1 km^{2}), of which 3.3 square miles (8.5 km^{2}) is land and 0.1 square miles (0.26 km^{2}), or 2.90%, is water.

== Demographics ==
Historical population
Census	Pop.	Note	%±
2020	20,901		—
U.S. Decennial Census

As of the census of 2010, there were 19,554 people, 7,687 households, and 5,127 families residing in the CDP. The population density was 5,542.4 inhabitants per square mile (2,139.9/km^{2}). There were 7,919 housing units at an average density of 2,364.3 per square mile (912.9/km^{2}). The racial makeup of the CDP was 90.22% White, 0.94% Black or African American, 0.06% Native American, 6.58% Asian, 0.02% Pacific Islander, 0.94% from other races, and 1.23% from two or more races. Hispanic or Latino of any race were 3.56% of the population.

According to the 2010 population 24.26% are under the age of 18, 56.1% were married couples living together, 8.4% had a female householder with no husband present, and 33.3% were non-families. 30.3% of all households were made up of individuals, and 14.5% had someone living alone who was 65 years of age or older. The average household size was 2.41 and the average family size was 3.04.

In the CDP, the population was spread out, with 22.2% under the age of 18, 4.7% from 18 to 24, 28.8% from 25 to 44, 24.8% from 45 to 64, and 19.5% who were 65 years of age or older. The median age was 42 years. For every 100 females, there were 86.9 males. For every 100 females age 18 and over, there were 82.2 males.

The median income for a household in the CDP was $75,117, and the median income for a family was $96,179. Males had a median income of $66,684 versus $49,117 for females. The per capita income for the CDP was $42,067. About 2.5% of families and 3.6% of the population were below the poverty line, including 3.4% of those under age 18 and 4.9% of those age 65 or over.
