= Immaculate Conception Church (Tuckahoe, New York) =

Catholic parish in New York

Church of the Immaculate Conception
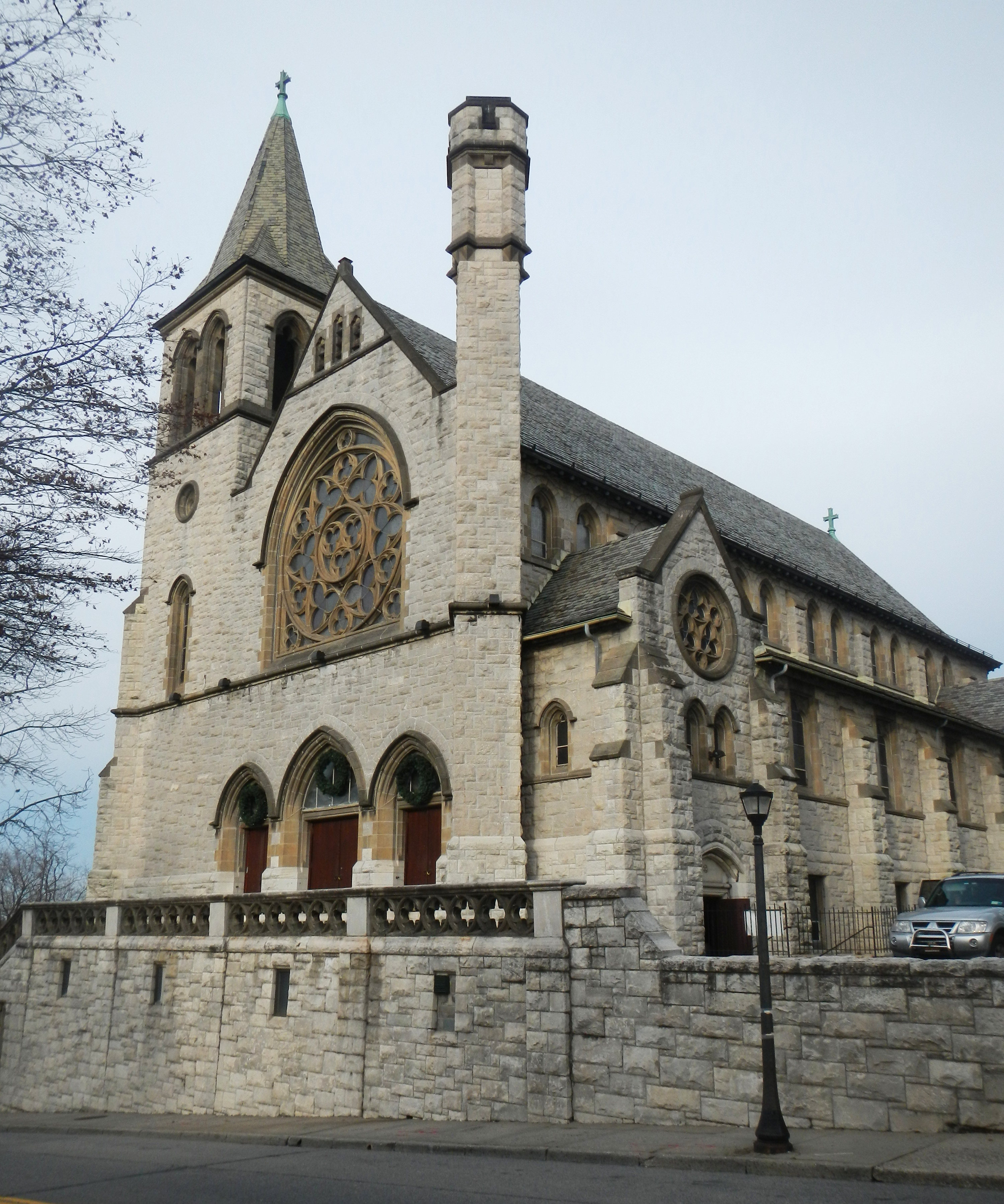
- Facade of the church from street level

- Location in New York
- 40°56′50″N 73°49′16″W
- Location: 53 Winter Hill Road, Tuckahoe, New York 10707
- Denomination: Catholic Church
- Tradition: Roman Rite
- Website: Immaculate Conception Church

History
- Status: Parish church
- Founded: 1853
- Dedication: Immaculate Conception
- Consecrated: 1911

Architecture
- Functional status: Active
- Style: French Gothic Revival
- Groundbreaking: November 8, 1908
- Completed: 1911

Specifications
- Length: 150 feet (46 m)
- Width: 70 feet (21 m)
- Materials: Tuckahoe marble

Administration
- Archdiocese: Archdiocese of New York

Clergy
- Pastor: Fr. Anthony Sorgie

The Church of the Immaculate Conception is a Catholic parish church of the Archdiocese of New York located in Tuckahoe, New York. Founded in 1853, the parish is dedicated to the Immaculate Conception of the Blessed Virgin Mary. Following a merger, the parish was reorganized as the parish of the Immaculate Conception and the Assumption of Our Lady, including the respective two churches.

== History ==
The Church of the Immaculate Conception was created as a mission of the Church of the Blessed Sacrament in New Rochelle in 1853 under the pastorship of Fr. Thomas McLoughlin by order of the Archbishop of New York, John Hughes. Though not yet an official parish or mission, mass was said regularly by Fr. Eugene Maguire from St. Raymond's Church in the Bronx in the colonial-era Marble House that lies across NYS Route 22. By virtue of its founding date, the Church of the Immaculate Conception is the oldest Catholic church in Eastchester (the town in which the village of Tuckahoe is located) and one of the oldest in Westchester County, as well as one of the oldest institutions of any kind in Eastchester.

With a growing Irish, Italian, German, and Lithuanian population of Catholics in the Bronxville area of Eastchester (the area not yet incorporated into a village), as well as the neighboring communities in Eastchester and Yonkers, Immaculate Conception's priest, Fr. John G. McCormack with the assistance of Fr. Joseph L. McCann and Fr. Martin Lydon, established a mission in 1905 that would eventually become the Church of St. Joseph.

Construction of a wooden church building began in Waverly Square and Archbishop Michael Corrigan deeded to the young parish the plot of land on which it sat in 1886, though it had initially been gifted to the Archdiocese of New York 32 years prior by a local Catholic quarryman. A belfry was subsequently added in 1885. The mission that was dedicated in the honor of the Immaculate Conception was elevated to the rank of a parish in 1878 by Cardinal John McCloskey upon the visit and recommendation of the archdiocese's vicar general William Quinn. The parish's first pastor, Fr. John Ambrose Keogh, was appointed that year. The parish was incorporated on April 5, 1886, as "The Church of the Immaculate Conception in the Village of Tuckahoe, County of Westchester, N.Y." and lay trustees were appointed.

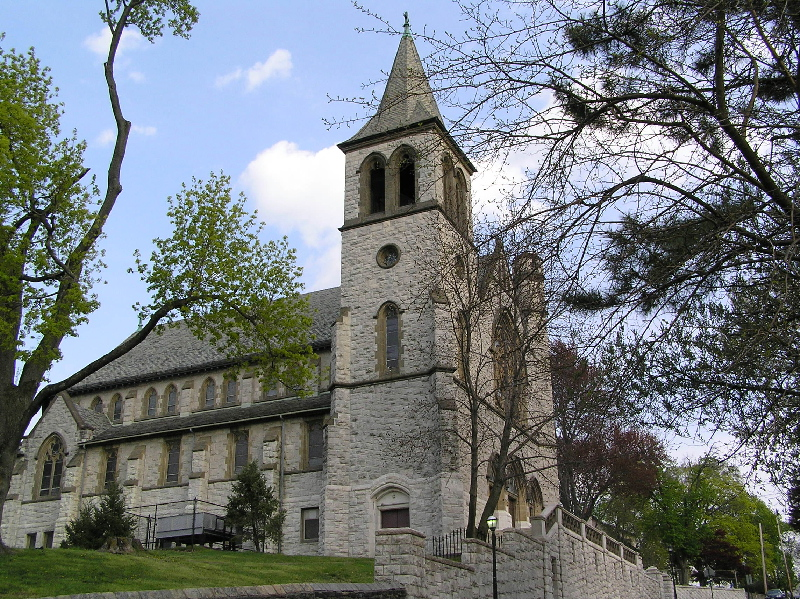
View of the church from lower down the hill

With the appointment of Fr. John G. McCormick as pastor, a new plot of land that would house the present-day French Gothic Revival church was purchased for $15,000, a price asked by the Catholic owners that was significantly lower than market value. The new building was designed by Thomas J. Duff and the cornerstone was laid on November 8, 1908, with a parade and ceremony attended by 5,000 locals. For lack of funds, parishioners, many of whom worked in the Tuckahoe quarries, helped to build the church part-time. The church was completed in 1911 with its dimensions measuring 150 feet (46 m) in length and 70 feet (21 m) in width. The stone façade was constructed from locally quarried Tuckahoe marble. Stained glass windows were delivered from Munich and the pipe organ of the old wooden church was disassembled and moved to the new church, where it remains today. The first mass was celebrated August 20, 1911 and the building was consecrated the following year on May 18 by Msgr. Patrick J. Hayes. At the time of consecration, around 900 Catholics were parishioners of the church. Over time, adjacent properties were acquired, on which the present-day school building and other facilities were constructed. This new church building was quickly supplemented by the construction of the nearby Church of the Assumption as a national parish for the many new Italian immigrants.

In 1912, the School of the Immaculate Conception was founded as a parochial elementary school in the no-longer-used wooden church building approximately a mile away, and by the following year was staffed by religious sisters. By 1914, the enrollment in the school had reached 75 students who were instructed by a lay teacher along with the sisters. A new School of the Immaculate Conception was later built in its current location abutting the church, and the former building was demolished. The Knights of Columbus established a Tuckahoe Council in 1920 and operate out of the Immaculate Conception parish.

In 2014, the Archbishop of New York, Cardinal Timothy Dolan, announced that the nearby parish of the Church of the Assumption would be merged with the Church of the Immaculate Conception as part of larger archdiocese-wide mergers.
