= Eric Naposki =

American football player and convicted murderer (born 1966)

No. 91, 58, 51
- Position: Linebacker

Personal information
- Born: December 20, 1966 (age 59); New York City, U.S.
- Listed height: 6 ft 2 in (1.88 m)
- Listed weight: 230 lb (104 kg)

Career information
- High school: Eastchester (NY)
- College: UConn
- NFL draft: 1988: undrafted

Career history
- New England Patriots (1988); Dallas Cowboys (1989)*; Indianapolis Colts (1989)*; New England Patriots (1989); Indianapolis Colts (1989); New York Jets (1990)*; Barcelona Dragons (1991−1992, 1996−1997)
- * Offseason or practice squad member only

Career NFL statistics
- Games played: 5
- Stats at Pro Football Reference

Eric Andrew Naposki (born December 20, 1966) is an American former professional football player who played in the National Football League (NFL) and World League of American Football (WLAF) from 1988 to 1997.

In May 2009, Naposki was arrested in Connecticut and charged with the murder of millionaire investor Bill McLaughlin in December 1994 in Newport Beach, California. The murder was committed in league with Nanette Johnston, McLaughlin's live-in girlfriend and Naposki's lover, so that she could collect McLaughlin's life insurance. In July 2011, Naposki was convicted of first degree murder and in August 2012, he was sentenced to life imprisonment without parole.

== Early life ==
Naposki, a native of Tuckahoe, New York, played Pop Warner Football with the "Blue Devils" out of Eastchester, New York, for eight seasons. He later attended Tuckahoe H.S. as well as Roosevelt H.S., the latter in Yonkers, New York, before transfer during his junior year to Eastchester High School.

He led the team in sacks and tackles for two years with the team going 17-3 during his tenure at linebacker position. Naposki also played safety, tight end and running back in goal line situations. He was named All County in 1982, and All State in 1983 and graduated from Eastchester in 1984.

He was offered partial scholarships by New Hampshire, New Haven and Buffalo but decided to attend the University of Connecticut (UConn) on a full football scholarship. At the time, UConn played as a Division I-AA in the now defunct Yankee Conference. However, midway through his third year at UConn, he quit the football team over a disagreement with his coach, Tom Jackson.

Naposki, who had NFL aspirations, decided to forgo his scholarship and withdrew from the university. He returned to UConn to complete his degree in 1987, although he left again for two years to pursue the NFL and received his degree in physical education in 1991.

== Professional career ==
After missing his senior year at Connecticut due to family obligations, he attended the New England Patriots' free agent tryout camp in April, 1988. He ended up making the team as a backup linebacker and played in 4 games.

On March 1, 1989, he signed as a Plan B free agent with the Dallas Cowboys. He was released on August 15. On August 18, he was claimed off waivers by the Indianapolis Colts. He played in one game before being released. On September 6, he was signed by the New England Patriots. He played in one game before being released.

On March 25, 1990, he signed as a free agent with the New York Jets. On August 29, he was waived with an injury settlement.

Naposki then played four seasons in the World League of American Football (WLAF) with the Barcelona Dragons, which won the 1997 World Bowl. While with the Dragons, Naposki recorded 16.5 sacks, one interception, one touchdown, and multiple blocked punts and field goals.

== Murder conviction ==
Millionaire investor William "Bill" McLaughlin was shot to death in his Newport Beach home on December 15, 1994. The murder was committed by Naposki in concert with Nanette Ann Johnston, McLaughlin's live-in girlfriend and Naposki's secret lover, so that she could collect $1 million (equivalent to $2 million in 2025) from McLaughlin's life insurance and savings. The case went unsolved for 15 years before Naposki and Johnston were charged in California in 2009.

At his July 2011 trial, witnesses testified that Johnston, also known in court documents as Nanette Packard McNeal (her married names), was a young woman with two small children who seduced McLaughlin, who was a quarter century her senior, after the wealthy health care entrepreneur had gone through a divorce with his first wife of 24 years. Johnston met McLaughlin after placing a magazine ad seeking the companionship of a wealthy man.

Johnston began living with McLaughlin in his luxury home in a tight-knit gated community in Newport Beach and managing his personal financial affairs.

On July 14, 2011, an Orange County jury found Naposki guilty of first-degree murder. The panel also found true a special circumstance allegation that Naposki committed the murder for financial gain and that he personally discharged a firearm, which would have made him eligible for the death penalty, although ultimately the state did not seek the death penalty. The jury heard during more than three weeks of testimony, which included 28 witnesses and more than 240 exhibits, that Naposki had conspired with Nanette Johnston, McLaughlin's live-in girlfriend and Naposki's secret lover, to murder McLaughlin for financial gain.

Naposki was scheduled to be sentenced on October 21, 2011; however, on that date sentencing was delayed until 2012. On August 10, 2012, Naposki received the maximum sentence of life imprisonment without parole at his hearing before Superior Court Judge William R. Froeberg.

In January 2012, an Orange County jury found Johnston (Packard McNeal) guilty of first-degree murder. In May 2012, she was sentenced to life imprisonment without parole.

On September 15, 2012, Naposki was transferred to the California Department of Corrections and Rehabilitation facility at Susanville, California; on October 12, 2013, he was transferred to California State Prison, Corcoran, also home to infamous killer Charles Manson until Manson's death in 2017.

In September 2014, an appellate lawyer working for Naposki told a three-justice appellate panel of Division Three of the California Courts of Appeal that there were four errors in the trial, including: the government's 15-year delay in filing charges; faulty jury instructions; biased jury; and improperly excluded evidence.

On September 12, 2014, the court rejected the appeal, with Justice William Rylaarsdam's 18-page opinion – backed by colleagues Raymond Ikola and David Thompson – analyzed and rejected each point, saying they found "no prejudicial error." The panel noted: authorities charged Naposki and Johnston (Packard McNeal) after an Orange County district attorney's office (OCDA) cold case detective discovered new incriminating evidence; a female juror describing the ex-football player as "creepy" did not merit her removal; that Judge William Froeberg did not err by blocking a police officer from answering a question about Naposki's facial expressions during a post-murder interview; and Froeberg did not err by refusing to give a defense-proposed jury instruction on the elements murder for financial gain.

Naposki has always maintained his innocence and is currently appealing his conviction. Naposki was convicted on strictly circumstantial evidence, as no weapon was ever found. There was no DNA, no fingerprints, no eyewitnesses and no surveillance tape. Naposki's defense contends that the fifteen-year delay in charging resulted in the loss of exculpatory evidence which backed up his alibi (which was found valid by the DA in 1995, before it was discovered that the club where he worked as a bouncer was only a few hundred yards from the murder scene).

The TV series American Greed showed an episode about the murder in January 2017. The CBS TV series 48 Hours aired, on 29 October 2011, the episode titled "Murder in the O.C." The Oxygen TV series Dateline Secrets Uncovered aired an episode titled “Deadly Trust” about the case in 2019. On 24 September 2021, ABC 20/20 aired an episode titled "Millionaire's Mistake". His Case is also featured on the Season 3, Episode 4, titled "SoCal Killers", from the Show, Deadly Sins.

As of March 11, 2020, the organization "Innocence Rights of Orange County" had begun a review of Naposki's case and conviction with an emphasis on the analysis of circumstantial evidence and the dealings of the Orange County prosecutors who brought the charges to a grand jury almost 15 years after the fact, with special emphasis on lost records from the initial investigation that might have cleared Naposki.
