= Eastchester High School =

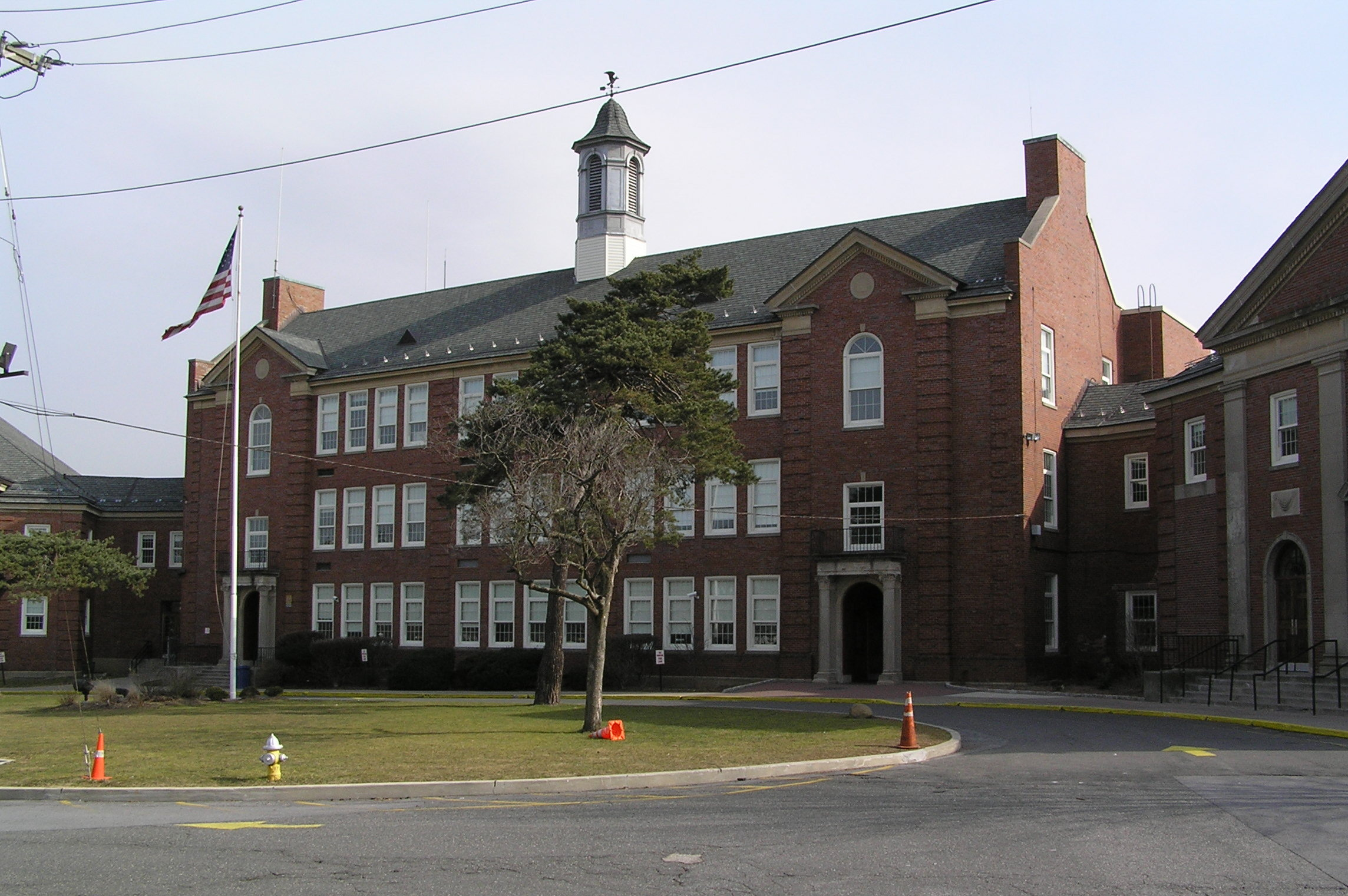

Location
- 2 Stewart Place; Eastchester, New York 10709; United States; 40.9614°N 73.8102°W

Information
- Established: 1927; 99 years ago
- School district: Eastchester Union Free School District
- NCES School ID: 361008000785
- Principal: Christopher Welsh
- Teaching staff: 94.08 (FTE)
- Grades: 9–12
- Enrollment: 976 (2022–2023)
- Student to teacher ratio: 10.37
- Colors: Red and blue
- Team name: Eagles
- Rivals: Harrison High school huskies, Scarsdale High School Raiders, Pelham High school Pelicans
- Website: ehs.eufsdk12.org

Eastchester High School is located in Eastchester, Westchester County, New York, United States. The only high school in the Eastchester Union Free School District, it is a former U.S. Department of Education Blue Ribbon school with approximately 1,009 students. Graduates have gained acceptance to schools such as Bucknell University, Johns Hopkins University, UCLA, UC Berkeley, Georgia Tech, Princeton University, Rensselaer Polytechnic Institute, University of Pennsylvania, University of Chicago, Cornell University, Notre Dame, University of Virginia, Vanderbilt University, New York University, University of North Carolina Chapel Hill, Harvard University, Columbia University, and Stanford University. Eastchester High School is accredited by the New York State Board of Regents and the Middle States Association of Colleges and Schools.

== History ==
=== Original Buildings ===
A junior high school was added to the high school in 1955, and two years later, another wing was constructed to make up what is now known as Eastchester Middle School. The original gym and an auditorium were built at the high school in 1932, and a second gym was opened there in 1985.

=== Expansions ===
Eastchester High School received a major infrastructure overhaul with the passage of a $27 million-dollar bond vote in 2015. Among the additions were a new STEM wing, two computer labs, and an expanded cafeteria to reduce congestion of the rapidly growing student body.

During the summer of 2023, Eastchester High School received extra parking spots in front of the high school entrance. Construction of an overhang for the main entrance and an extra entrance started around the same time.

In January 2024, Eastchester High School had replaced their school signs with newly-installed digital message boards which display current events, the time, and the temperature.

== Academics ==
Eastchester offers 18 AP classes as well as several courses for college credit in conjunction with colleges in New York State. Students who graduate from Eastchester High School graduate with a New York State Regents Diploma. A student must pass four New York State Regents Exams to be eligible to graduate—one in English Language Arts, one in Mathematics, one in Science, and one in Social Studies. A student must also pass one pathway. Upon successful passing of the four Regents Exams, one pathway, and 22 credit units, a student is eligible for a Regents or Local Diploma. Alternative pathways are allowed, but they must be pre-approved.

Eastchester High School is for students in grades 9–12 and is the only high school as part of the Eastchester Union Free School District. The high school is connected to the middle school, which hosts students in grades 6 through 8.

== Subjects offered ==
- Mathematics
- English Language Arts
- Science
- History
- Music
- Film
- Health
- Physical Education
- Art
- World Languages

== Athletics ==
Eastchester High School offers a number of varsity sports team competing in New York State's Section 1, including football, soccer, baseball, softball, basketball, track and field, volleyball, tennis, hockey, swimming, cross-country, lacrosse, and wrestling.

Eastchester's girls' tennis team won the New York State singles title in 2002 and 2004. Eastchester's varsity softball team won New York State Championships in 1990 and 1991, with their head coach, Thomas "Skip" Walsh; first base/pitcher, Bonnie Bell (Shelton), and pitcher, Jennifer Satriale (Weitman), all subsequently inducted into the New York State High School Softball Hall of Fame.

=== Notable players ===
- John Doherty (class of 1985) — MLB pitcher for the Detroit Tigers and the Boston Red Sox
- Nick Campana (class of 2014) — independent professional baseball center fielder for the Birmingham Bloomfield Beavers; Notable All-American from the University of Hartford

=== Notable coaches ===
- Ron Rothstein – coach of several NBA teams; both a physical education teacher and the varsity basketball coach in the late 1970s and early 1980s.

== Notable alumni ==
- Betty Broderick (class of 1965), high-profile murderer convicted of the killing of her ex-husband and his new wife in 1989
- Doug Crane (class of 1953), animator
- Jimmy Fink (class of 1967), New York radio personality
- Bobby Moynihan (class of 1995), cast Member of Saturday Night Live
- Eric Naposki (class of 1984), former NFL player, convicted of murder
- Kenneth Posner (class of 1983), Tony Award-winning lighting designer
- Jill Cornell Tarter (class of 1961), astronomer
- Chuck Traynor (class of 1955), pornographer
- Ereka Vetrini (class of 1994), reality TV star and TV host
