= Marble Schoolhouse =

- U.S. National Register of Historic Places
- New York State Register of Historic Places
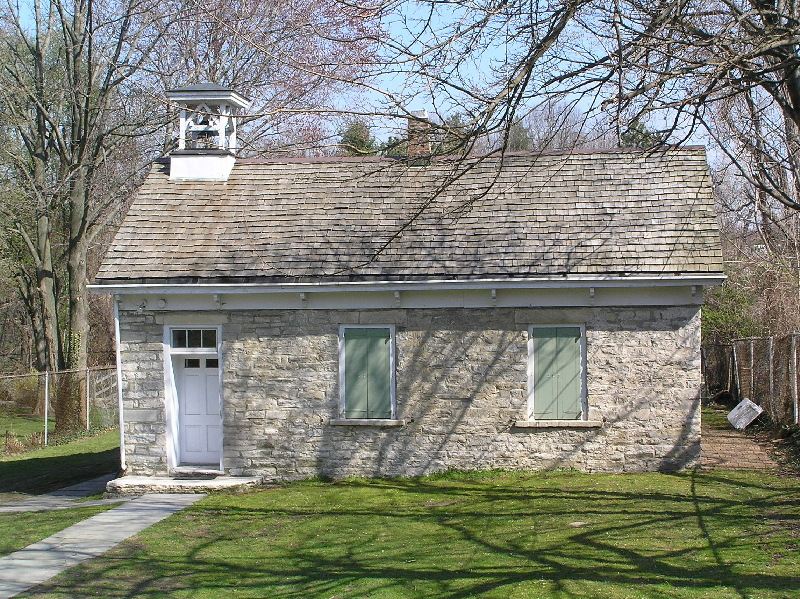

- Location within New York Location within the United States
- Location: 388 California Rd., Eastchester, New York
- Coordinates: 40°55′53″N 73°48′41″W
- Area: less than one acre
- Built: 1835
- Architectural style: Greek Revival
- NRHP reference No.: 05000663
- NYSRHP No.: 11903.000057

Significant dates
- Added to NRHP: July 6, 2005
- Designated NYSRHP: May 8, 2005

The Marble Schoolhouse is a Greek Revival style schoolhouse in Eastchester, New York that was built in 1835. The stone of its facade was quarried in nearby Tuckahoe, New York. It was listed on the National Register of Historic Places in 2005.

The building was moved to its current location in 1869.

The schoolhouse features exhibits of local history and is open by appointment with the Eastchester Historical Society.

== See also ==
- National Register of Historic Places listings in southern Westchester County, New York
