= Eastchester, New York =

- Town
- Town of Eastchester
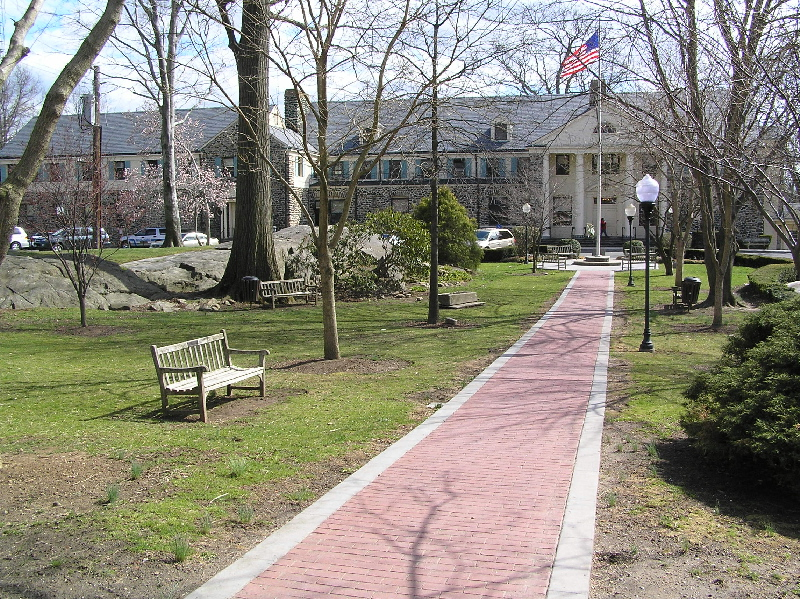
- Eastchester Town Hall

- Flag Seal

- Location of Eastchester (town), New York
- Coordinates: 40°57′13″N 73°48′48″W
- Country: United States
- State: New York
- County: Westchester
- Settled: 1664
- Established: 1665

Government
  - Type: Civil township
  - Town Supervisor: Anthony Colavita (R)

Area
  - Total: 4.94 sq mi (12.80 km^{2})
  - Land: 4.85 sq mi (12.57 km^{2})
  - Water: 0.089 sq mi (0.23 km^{2})
- Elevation: 194 ft (59 m)

Population (2020)
  - Total: 34,641
  - Density: 7,138/sq mi (2,756/km^{2})
- Time zone: UTC-5 (Eastern (EST))
  - Summer (DST): UTC-4 (EDT)
- ZIP code: 10707, 10708, 10709
- Area code: 914
- FIPS code: 36-21820
- GNIS feature ID: 978916
- Website: www.eastchester.gov

Eastchester is a town in southern Westchester County, New York, United States. The population was over 34,641 at the 2020 United States census over 32,363 at the 2010 census. There are two villages within the town: Bronxville and Tuckahoe. The town contains a census-designated place also named Eastchester, which is the whole town of Eastchester excluding Bronxville and Tuckahoe.

== History ==
The town that is now called Eastchester began settlement in 1664 when ten families migrated from Fairfield, Connecticut. Thomas Pell, who at that time also owned the territory that is now New Rochelle and Pelham, granted a deed to the group to "settle down at Hutchinsons'," where the home of Anne Hutchinson had stood some twenty years before. The ten original families were shortly joined by another 26.

Laws for the region were established the following year, in 1665, under an agreement called the "Eastchester Covenant". The covenant was a rare document for this period. It contained 26 provisions, including such items as education of children, disposition and upkeep of property, and support of a minister.

Confirmation of their 1664 land patent was granted by Governor Richard Nicolls in 1666 after the occupation of the area by the English. A controversy arose in 1700 when the settlers signed a deed with the Native Americans. The tract of land involved was known as "Long Reach" because of its odd geographical makeup. The sites included are the present Bronxville, Tuckahoe, and a section of northwest Mount Vernon. The dispute over the ownership of the land involved the towns of New Rochelle, Westchester and the Pell family. When a decision was reached in favor of Eastchester, England's Queen Anne granted a second patent in 1708.

Eastchester's village green was the site of the highly contested election for an open seat in the New York General Assembly, held on October 29, 1733; it was one of the better known political events in colonial America. The first issue of John Peter Zenger's New-York Weekly Journal carried a lengthy report on the election, producing one of the few complete accounts of a colonial election available to historians. This report and Zenger's subsequent publications led to his 1735 trial for libel. Zenger's acquittal in the trial is seen as a foundation of the freedom of the press in America.

Eastchester was a farming community at the outbreak of the American Revolution. As the heart of the Neutral Ground it saw constant fighting for over eight years, being harassed by both sides as well as by the Cowboys and Skinners (the guerrillas of the day). The 1776 Battle of Pell's Point took place about 1 mile from the historic heart of Eastchester, and the Church of Eastchester (which would later become the Saint Paul's Church National Historic Site) served as a British military hospital following the battle.

Eastchester's rural makeup began to change with the coming of the railroad in the 1840s. An area of 370 acres (1,500,000 m^{2}) of land was incorporated as the village of Mount Vernon in 1853 by a group of New York businessmen; the village of Bronxville was incorporated in 1898; and the village of Tuckahoe in 1903. Today, Eastchester is bounded by Scarsdale on the north, New Rochelle on the east, Yonkers on the west, and Mount Vernon on the south. The town covers approximately five square miles, including Bronxville and Tuckahoe.

Babe Ruth was a member of Leewood Country Club.

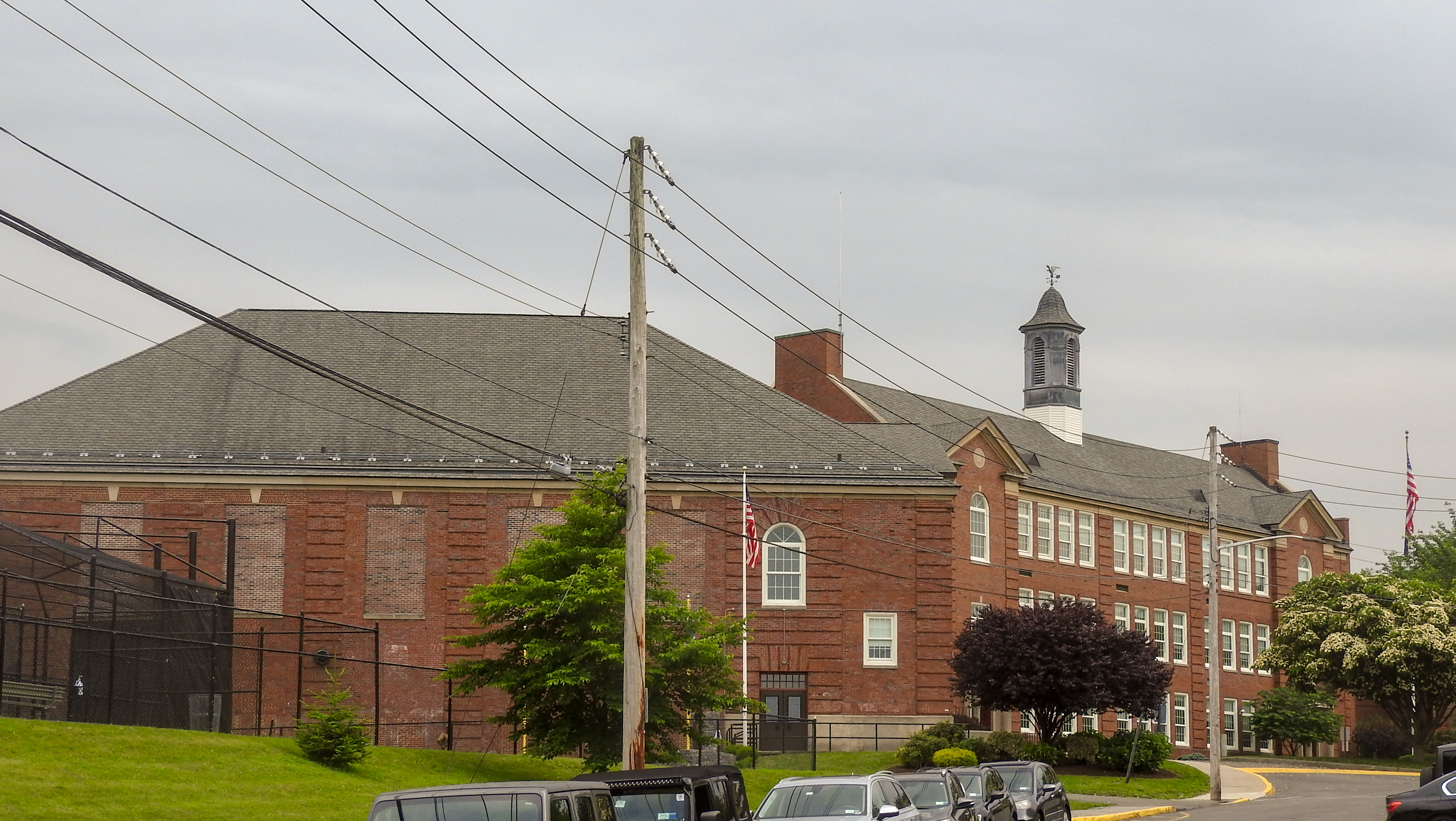
Eastchester High School

The Marble Schoolhouse and Tuckahoe High School are listed on the National Register of Historic Places.

In 1899, the University system of New York State granted a charter to the Waverly Union School, located in present day Eastchester (called Upper Tuckahoe at the time), which housed grades kindergarten through twelve. This charter marks the beginnings of the Eastchester Union Free District. Waverly was the center of the Eastchester educational community, until Eastchester High School was completed in 1927. Waverly continued to serve as an elementary school until 1983. In 1990, it was refurbished and opened as the Waverly Early Childhood Center.

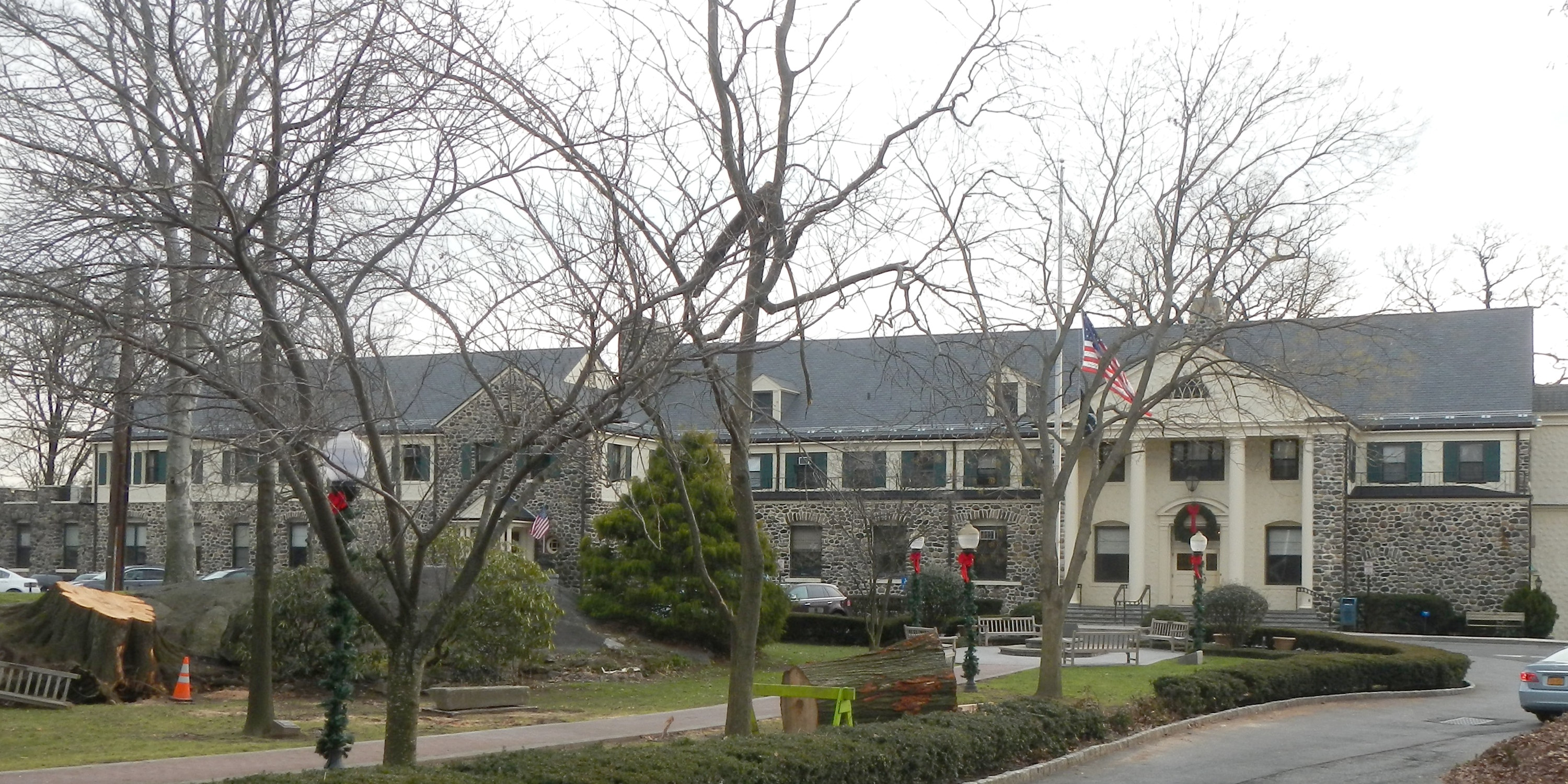
Town Hall

The Wilmot School near the corner of White Plains Road and Wilmot Road was a K-8 school that serviced the north end of town after 1909. When the Greenvale elementary school was erected in 1936, the Wilmot School was converted into Eastchester's Town Hall. In 1964, the clubhouse of the Oak Ridge Country Club was converted into the present Town Hall, and the Wilmot School was torn down. The Cooper School, located in the northern end of town, was an elementary school built in the 1920s. It was demolished in 1980 and the land sold to a private housing developer. The original schoolyard lives on as Cooper Field, leased to the town of Eastchester at the rate of one dollar per year. The park is also referred to as Vaccaro Park, as it was originally donated by Carmela Vaccaro the matriarch of one of the largest and longest standing families in Eastchester. The Anne Hutchinson School, another elementary school, was built in 1953, and additional classrooms constructed several years later. A primary wing was built at the Greenvale School in the 1950s.

== Geography ==
According to the United States Census Bureau, the town has a total area of 5.0 square miles (13 km^{2}), of which 4.9 square miles (13 km^{2}) is land and 0.1 square miles (0.26 km^{2}), or 2.00%, is water.

=== Communities in Eastchester ===
Village of Bronxville:

- Bronxville Heights
- Lawrence Park

Village of Tuckahoe:

- Waverly
- Bronxville Manor
- Crestwood

Eastchester, unincorporated hamlet:

- Lake Isle (sections also in New Rochelle)
- Twin Lakes
- California Ridge
- Hickory Hills
- Huntley Estates
- Chester Heights (sections also in New Rochelle)
- The North End
- The Industrial Sector
- Green Knolls
- Garth Road
- Waverly Heights
- Bronxville Manor

== Demographics ==
Historical population
Census	Pop.	Note	%±
1800	738		—
1810	1,039		40.8%
1820	1,021		−1.7%
1830	1,030		0.9%
1840	1,502		45.8%
1850	1,679		11.8%
1860	5,582		232.5%
1870	7,491		34.2%
1880	8,737		16.6%
1890	4,612		−47.2%
1900	3,040		−34.1%
1910	6,422		111.3%
1920	9,372		45.9%
1930	20,340		117.0%
1940	23,492		15.5%
1950	27,174		15.7%
1960	33,613		23.7%
1970	36,660		9.1%
1980	32,648		−10.9%
1990	30,867		−5.5%
2000	31,318		1.5%
2010	32,363		3.3%
2020	34,641		7.0%
U.S. Decennial Census

As of the census of 2000, there were 31,318 people, 12,626 households, and 8,408 families residing in the town. The population density was 6,376.3 inhabitants per square mile (2,461.9/km^{2}). There were 13,035 housing units at an average density of 2,653.9 per square mile (1,024.7/km^{2}). The racial makeup of the town was 87.35% White, 5.80% Black or African American, 0.07% Native American, 3.85% Asian, 0.03% Pacific Islander, 1.40% from other races, and 1.51% from two or more races. Hispanic or Latino of any race were 5.48% of the population.

There were 12,626 households, out of which 31.4% had children under the age of 18 living with them, 55.7% were married couples living together, 8.7% had a female householder with no husband present, and 33.4% were non-families. 29.8% of all households were made up of individuals, and 13.1% had someone living alone who was 65 years of age or older. The average household size was 2.46 and the average family size was 3.09.

In the town, the population was spread out, with 23.8% under the age of 18, 5.4% from 18 to 24, 29.8% from 25 to 44, 24.2% from 45 to 64, and 16.7% who were 65 years of age or older. The median age was 40 years. For every 100 females, there were 87.7 males. For every 100 females age 18 and over, there were 83.0 males.

According to a 2007 estimate, the median income for a household in the town was $101,425, and the median income for a family was $137,663. Males had a median income of $71,420 versus $47,725 for females. The per capita income for the town was $49,941. About 3.0% of families and 4.2% of the population were below the poverty line, including 3.4% of those under age 18 and 5.2% of those age 65 or over.

On July 1, 2018, the U.S. Census Bureau estimated the population at 32,964. There were 12,748 households and the racial makeup was 79.3% non-Hispanic white, 1.9% Black or African American, 0.1% Native American, 8.0% Asian, 3.9% from two or more races, and 8.0% Hispanic or Latino of any race. 19.1% of the town was foreign-born and 24.1% spoke another language other than English at home.

The median income from 2014-2018 was $120,867 and the per capita income was $74,393. 4.1% of the population lived below the poverty line in 2018.

== Arts and culture ==
=== Notable locations ===
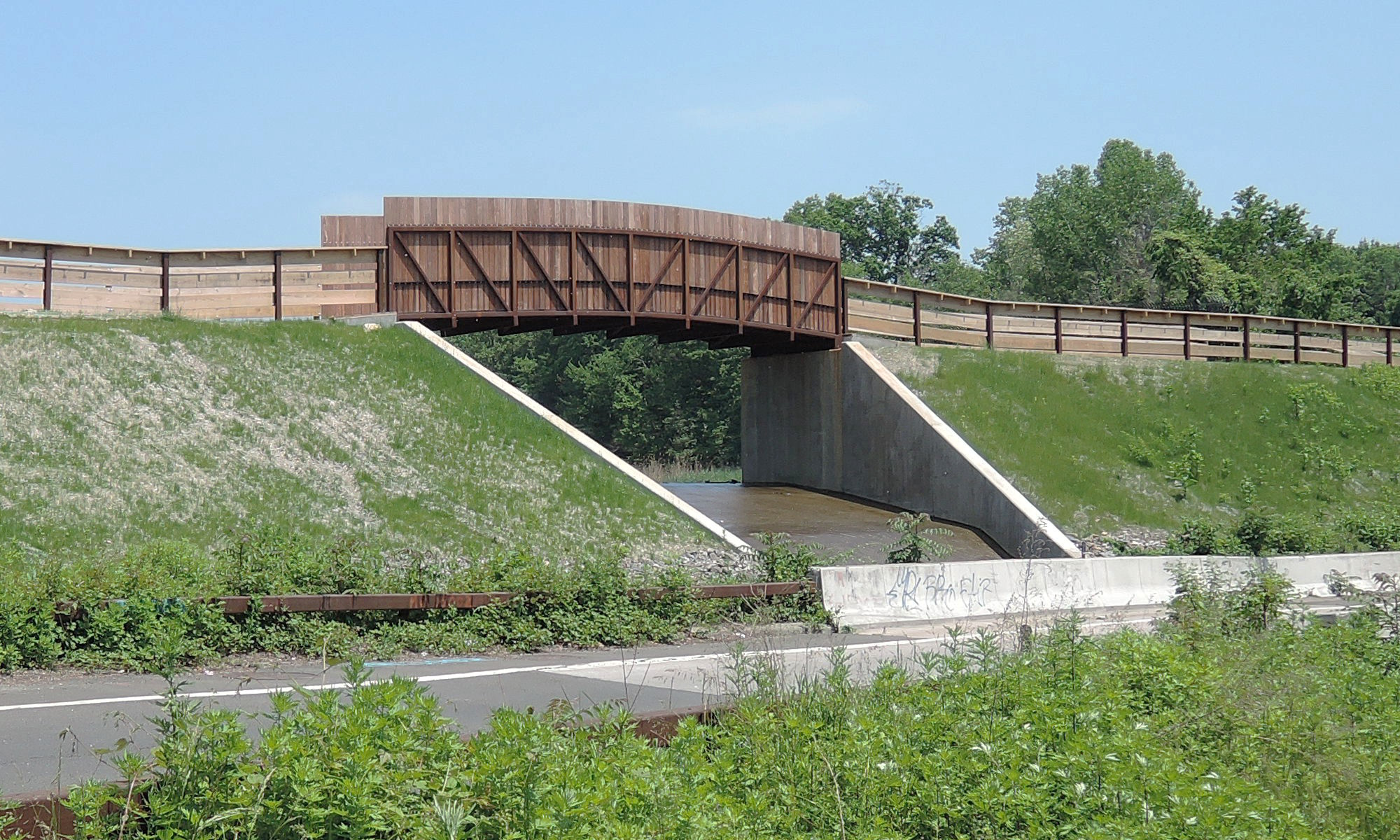
Twin Lakes Park

- Hotel Gramatan, built in 1905 to accommodate the burgeoning artist community of Lawrence Park in Bronxville. The hotel was demolished in 1972.
- Lake Isle Country Club - opened before 1920 and was known as the Mount Vernon Country Club.
- Marble Schoolhouse - one-room schoolhouse built in 1835; constructed of Tuckahoe Marble
- Twin Lakes County Park - operated by the Westchester County Department of Parks with many trails, wildlife, Twin Lakes Farms horse stables, and a lake.
- Town Hall - the site was originally a farm, later a country club and golf club. Dedicated in 1957 and converted to Pennsylvania style utilizing the existing stonework and slate roof. Town Hall is the only town center in Westchester County to house a wide variety of town departments and local civic functions.
- Vernon Hills Shopping Center - constructed in the 1950s, it is the main shopping center in the town of Eastchester.
- Westchester Funeral Home - founded in 1832, the home arranged the funeral for US President James A. Garfield in 1881.

== Education ==
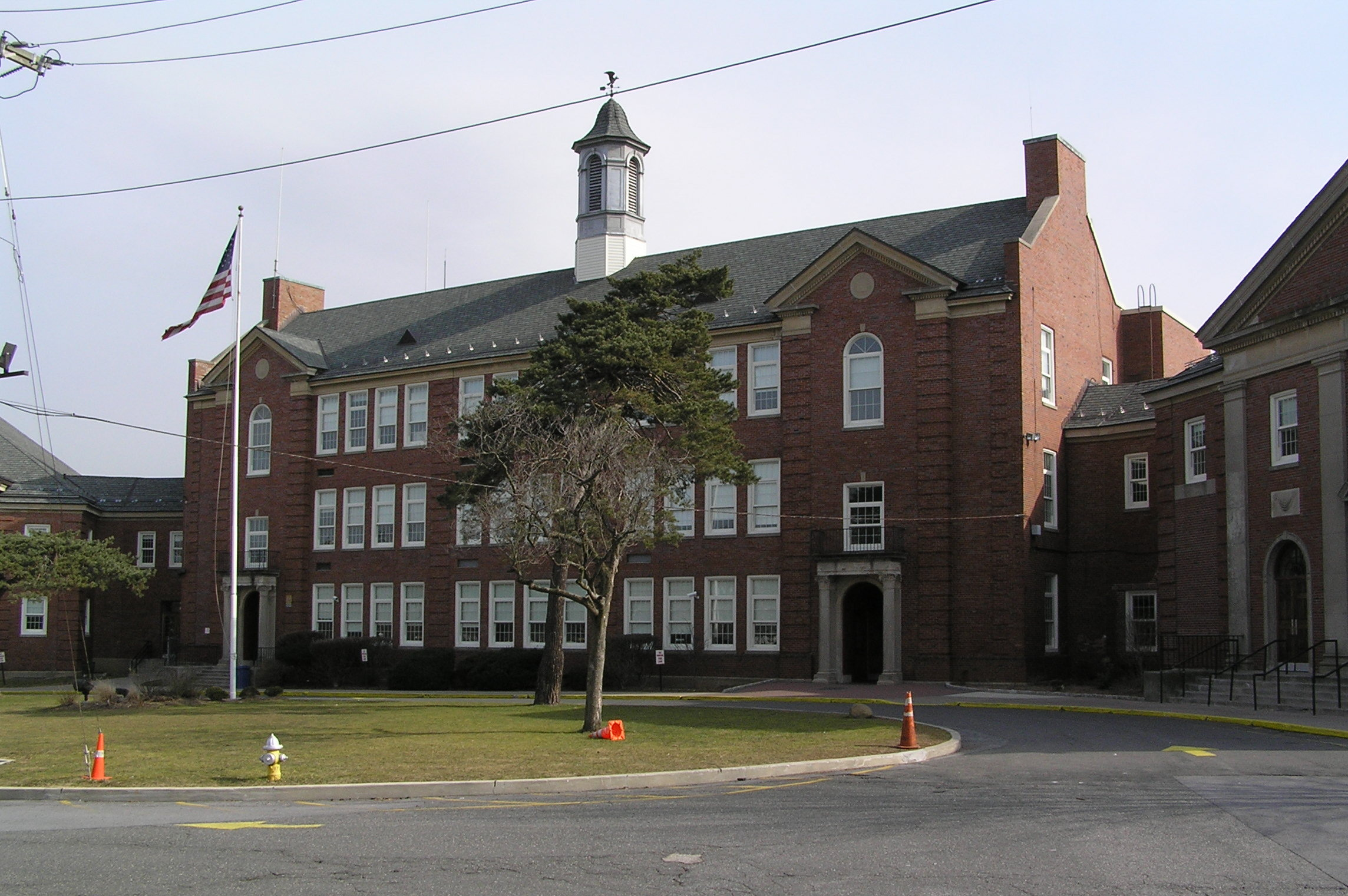
Eastchester High School

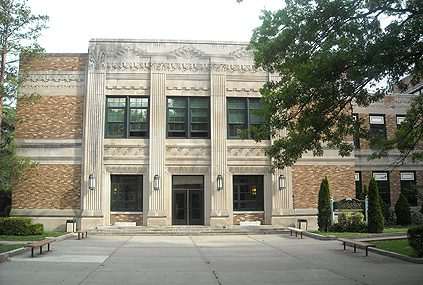
Tuckahoe High School

Eastchester Union Free School District serves a portion.

- Eastchester High School
- Eastchester Middle School
- Anne Hutchinson Elementary
- Greenvale Elementary
- Waverly School

Tuckahoe Union Free School District serves a portion

- Tuckahoe High School
- Tuckahoe Middle School
- Cottle Elementary

Bronxville Union Free School District (one K-12 school) also serves a portion

Private:

- Immaculate Conception School of the Roman Catholic Archdiocese of New York
- Chapel School
- St. Joseph School

== Notable people ==
- Harrison Bader (born 1994), Major League Baseball outfielder for the Philadelphia Phillies, New York Yankees, St. Louis Cardinals.
- Betty Broderick, high-profile murderer convicted of the killing of her ex-husband and his new wife
- Aaron Burr, third Vice President of the United States under President Thomas Jefferson
- Tom Creavy, PGA golfer who won the 1931 PGA Championship
- John Doherty, former MLB pitcher for the Detroit Tigers and Boston Red Sox
- Johnny Farrell, PGA golfer who won the 1928 U.S. Open
- Jimmy Fink, New York radio personality
- Nick Fotiu, NHL Forward who lived on the shores of Lake Innisfree during his tenure with the NY Rangers
- Mario Gabelli, stock investor who lived on the shores of Lake Innisfree
- Anne Hutchinson, early advocate of religious freedom
- Willie Macfarlane, PGA golfer who won the U.S. Open in 1925
- Bobby Moynihan, actor & comedian from Saturday Night Live
- Eric Naposki, NFL player, convicted of "love triangle" murder for financial gain
- Kenneth Posner, Tony Award-winning theatrical lighting designer
- Tony Sayegh, Assistant Secretary for Public Affairs for the U. S. Department of the Treasury
- T. F. Secor (1808–1901), marine engineer and co-founder of T. F. Secor & Co.
- Jess Sweetser, golfer who won the British Amateur Championship in 1926
- Ed Ward, writer and music critic
- John Peter Zenger, defendant in a landmark legal case that laid the foundation for press freedom

== Gallery ==
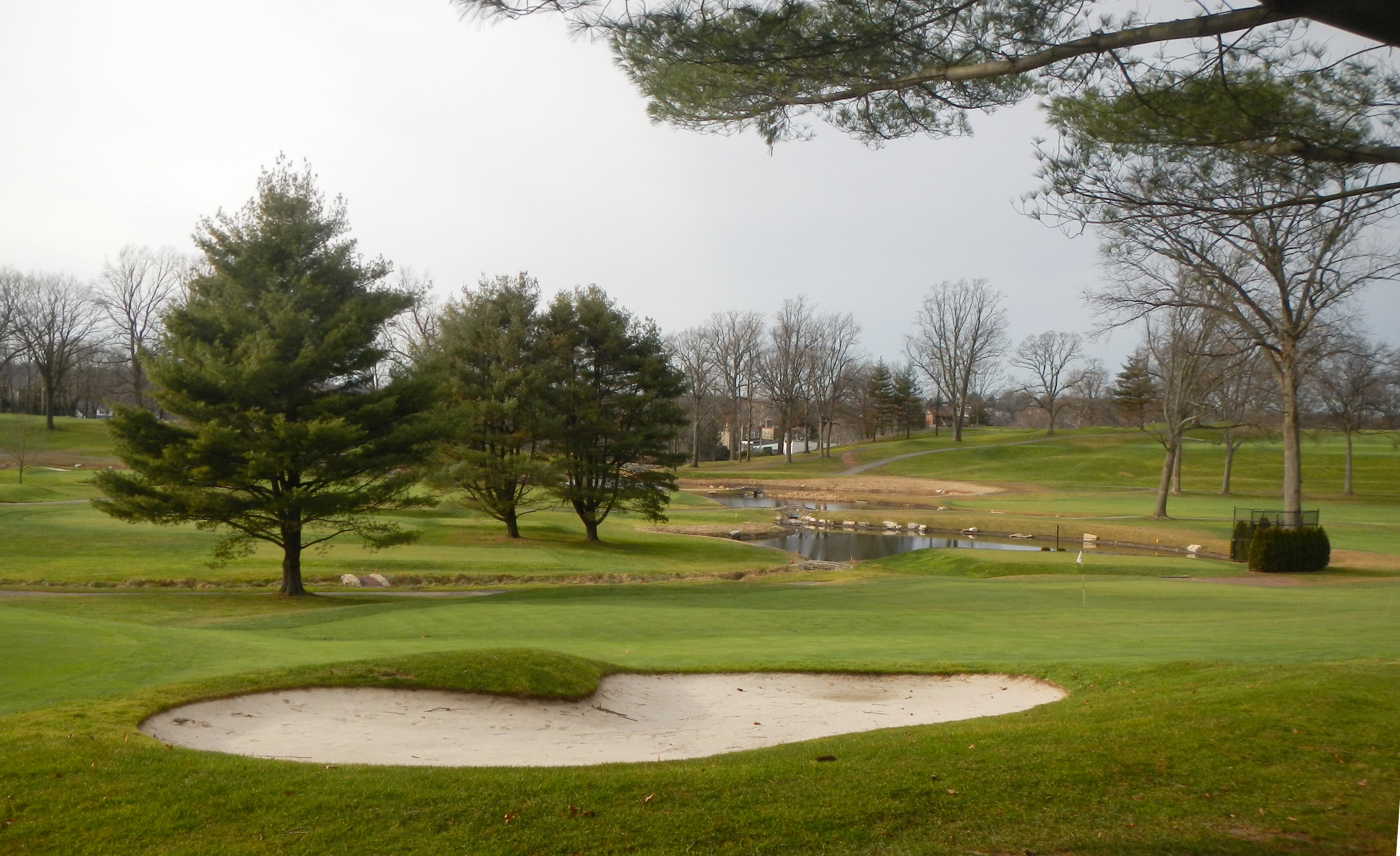
Leewood Golf Course

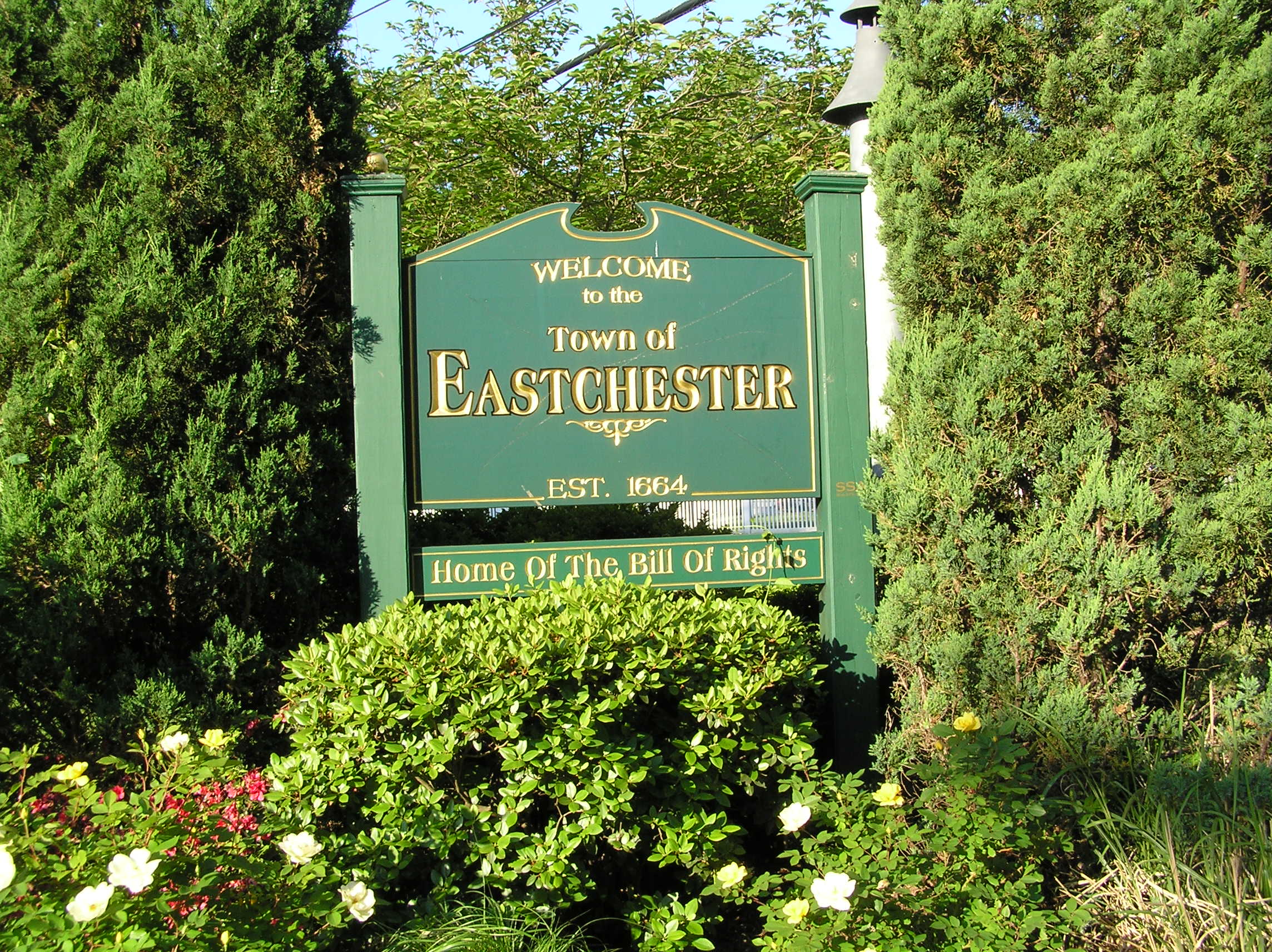
Town of Eastchester welcome sign

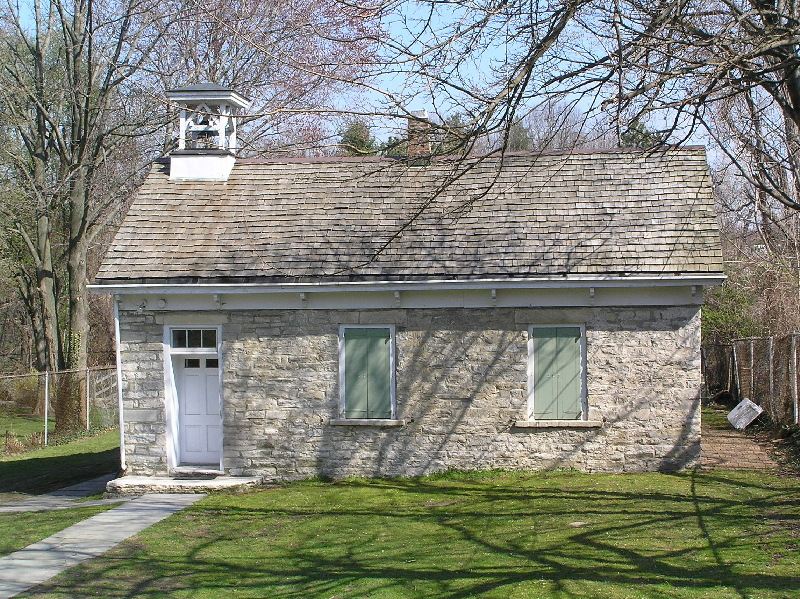
Marble schoolhouse

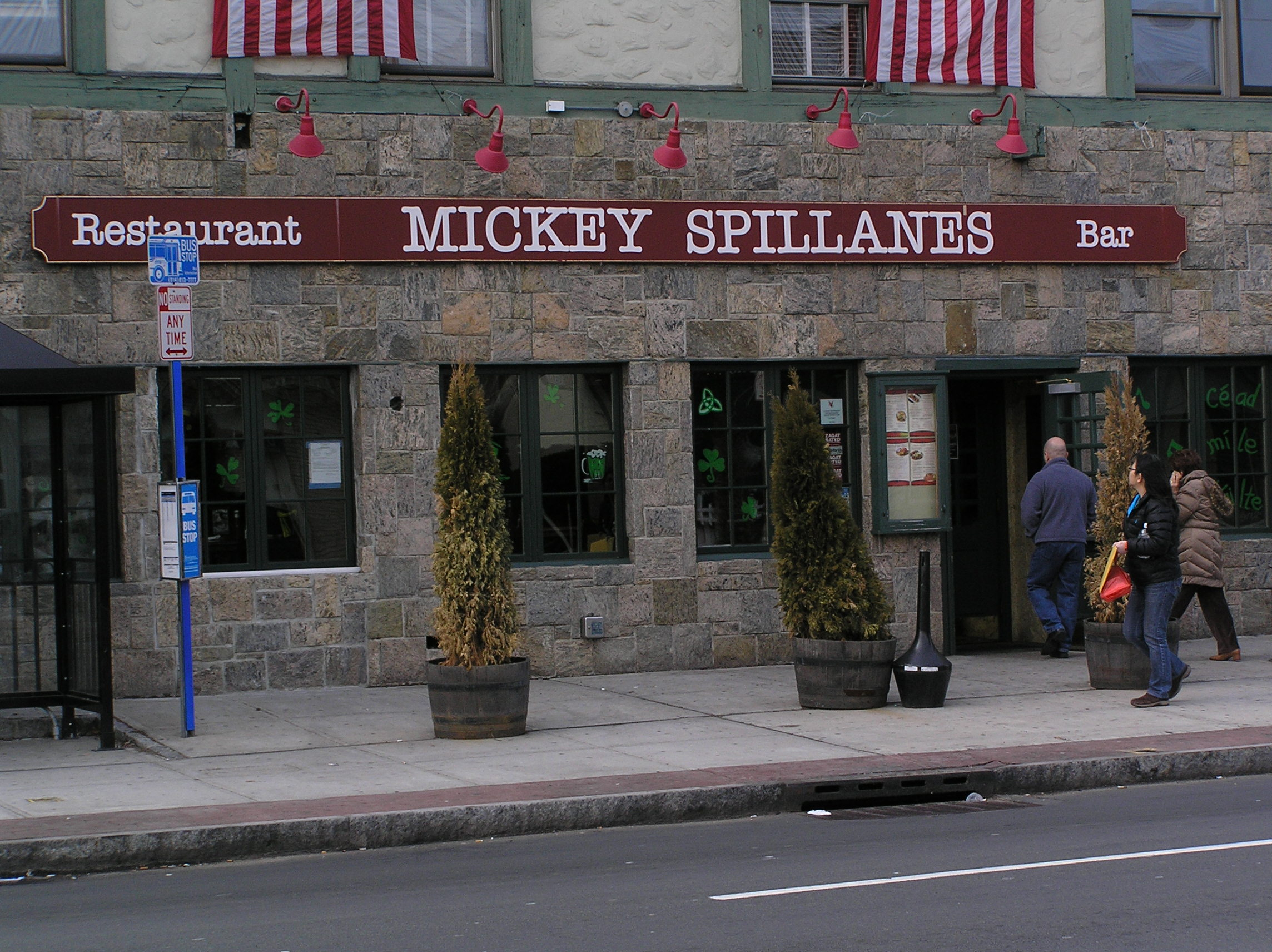
Mickey Spillane's Restaurant

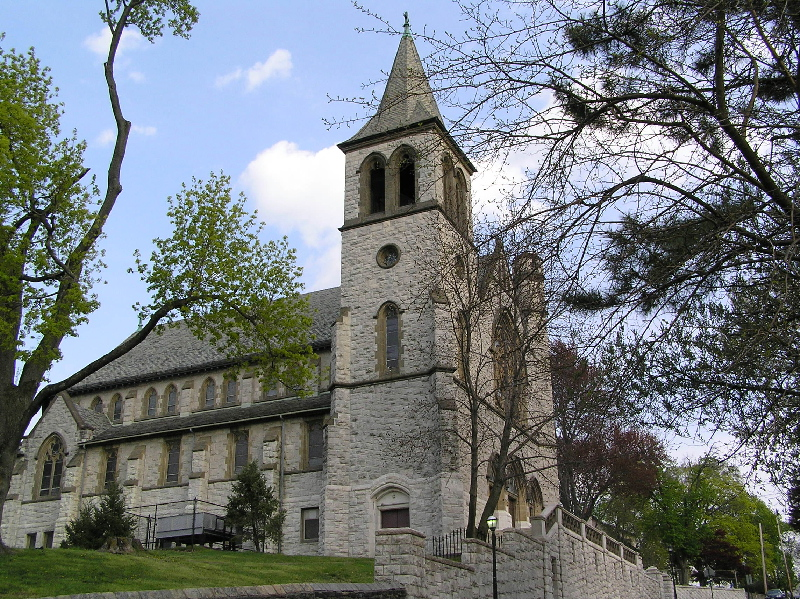
Immaculate Conception Church

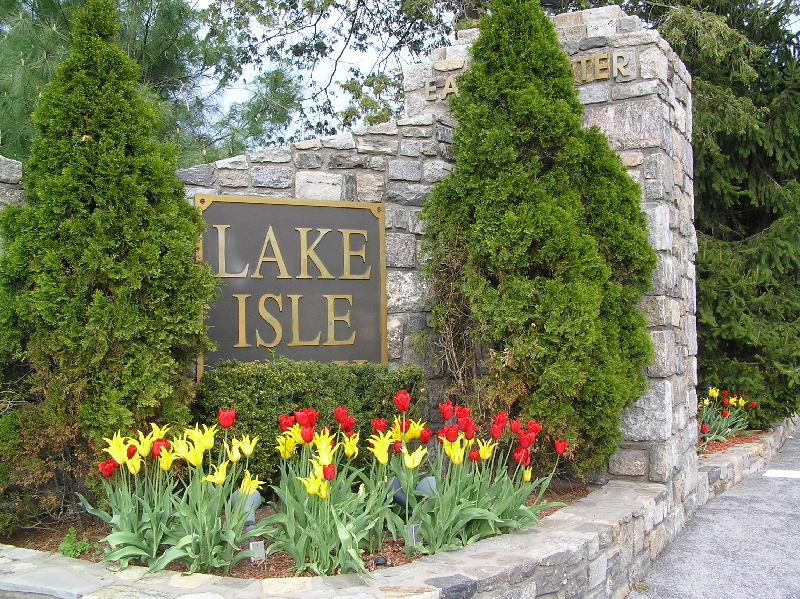
Lake Isle Country Club

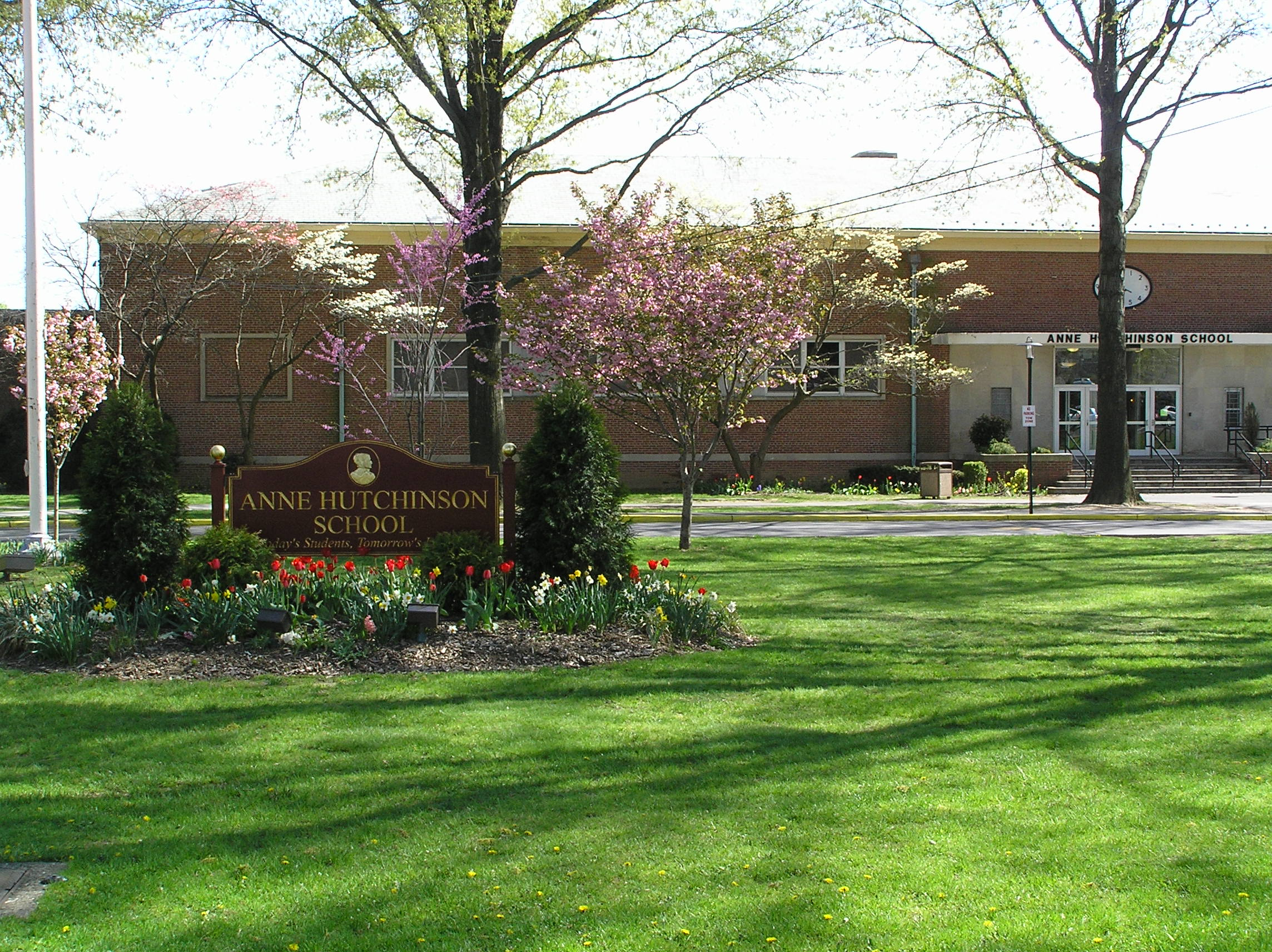
Anne Hutchinson School

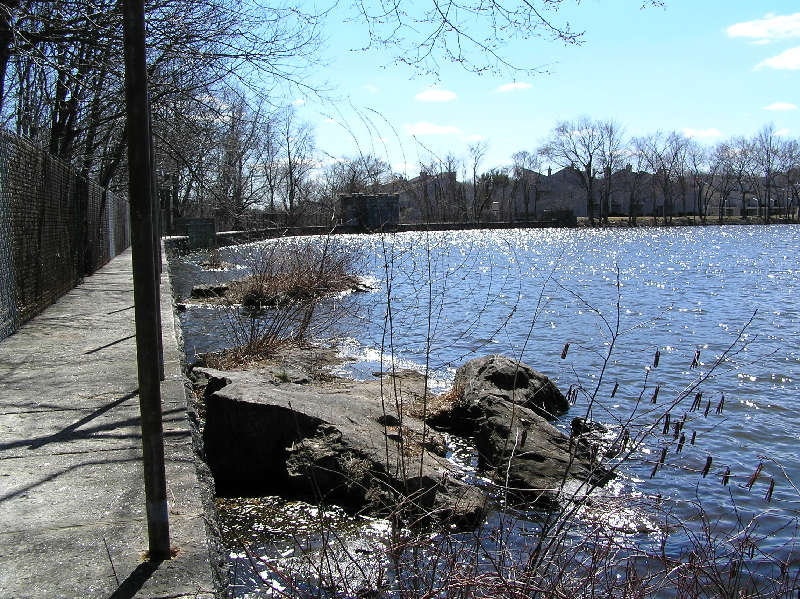
Interlaken Reservoir

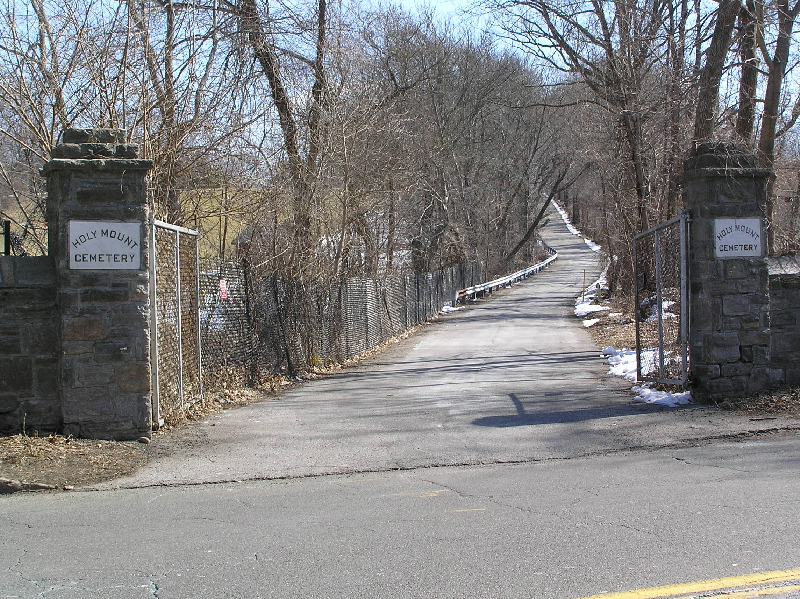
The entrance to Holy Mount Cemetery

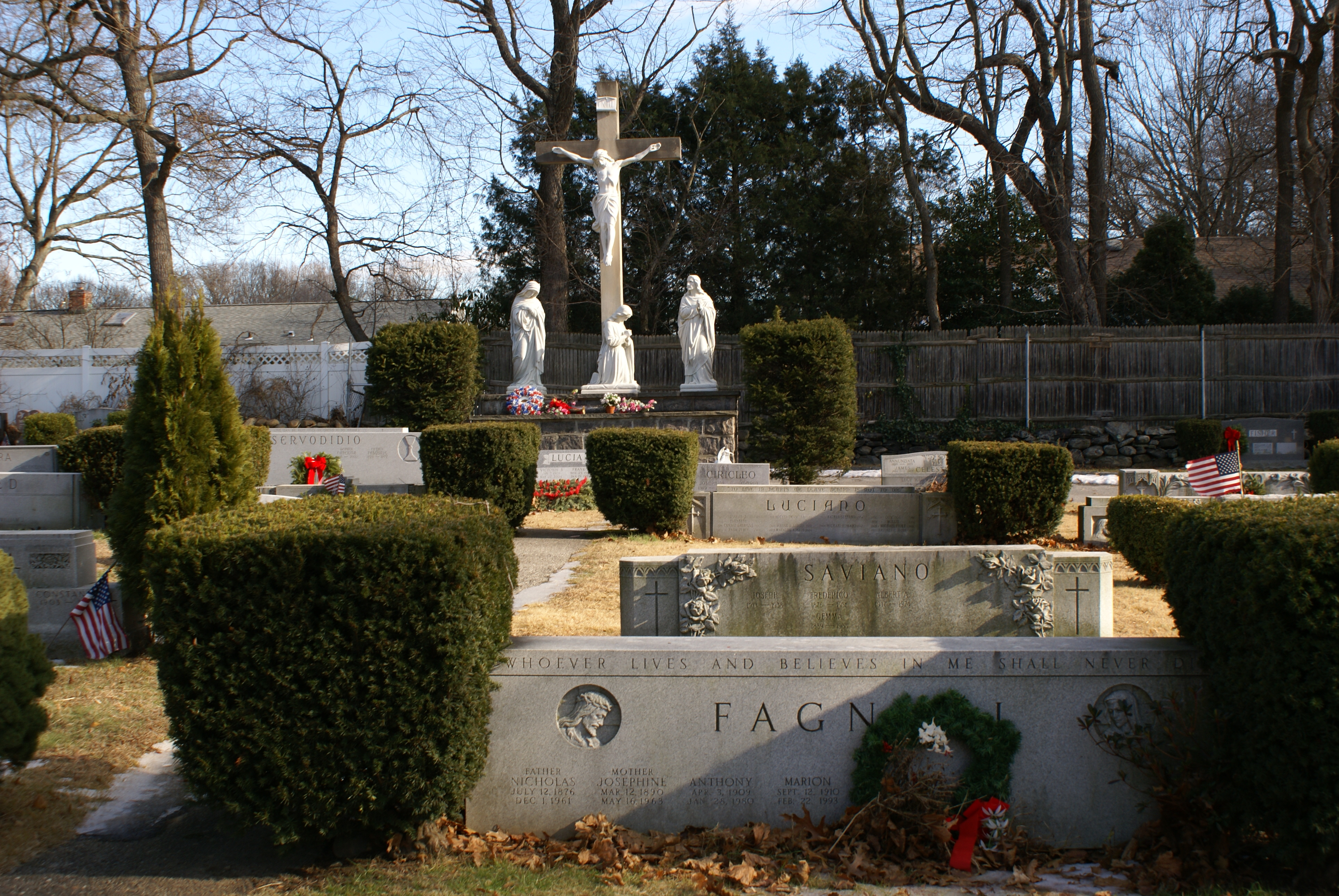
The graves in Holy Mount Cemetery

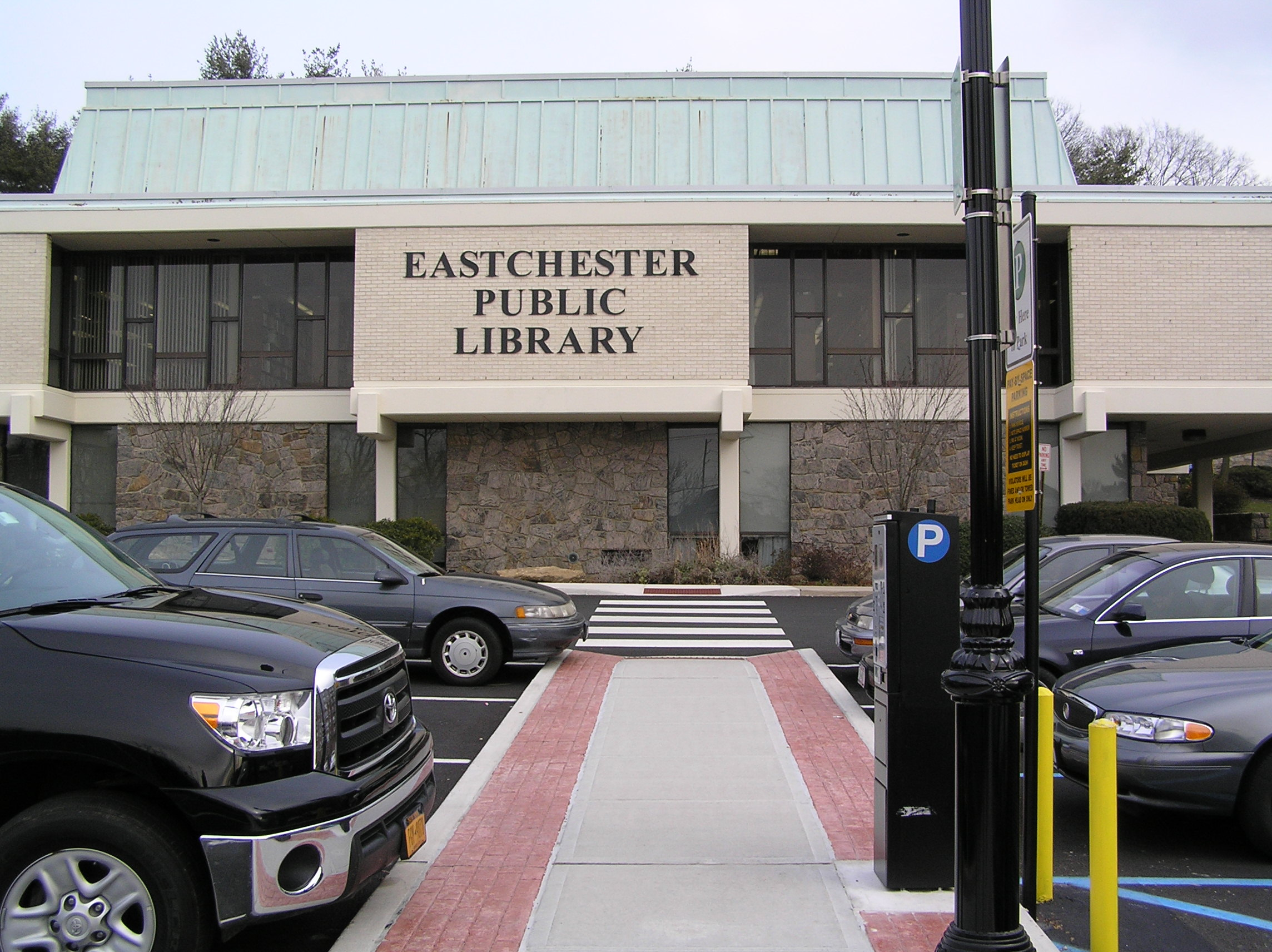
Eastchester Public Library

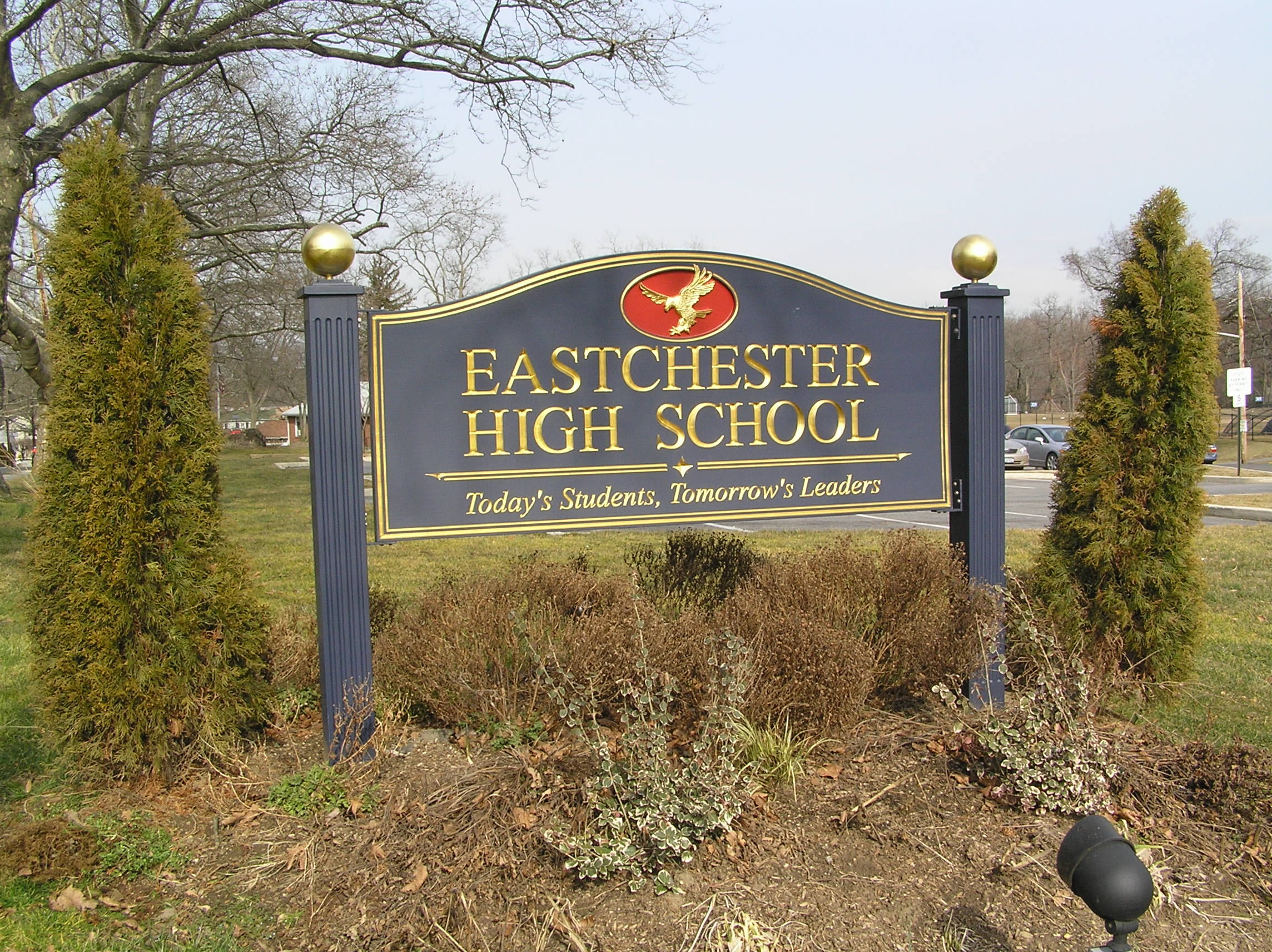
Banner at Eastchester High School

== In popular culture ==
- The World According to Garp (1982). The film starred Robin Williams.
- Main Street in Tuckahoe was used for a scene in the film Riding in Cars with Boys (2001)
