= Tuckahoe (village), New York =

Tuckahoe, New York
- Village
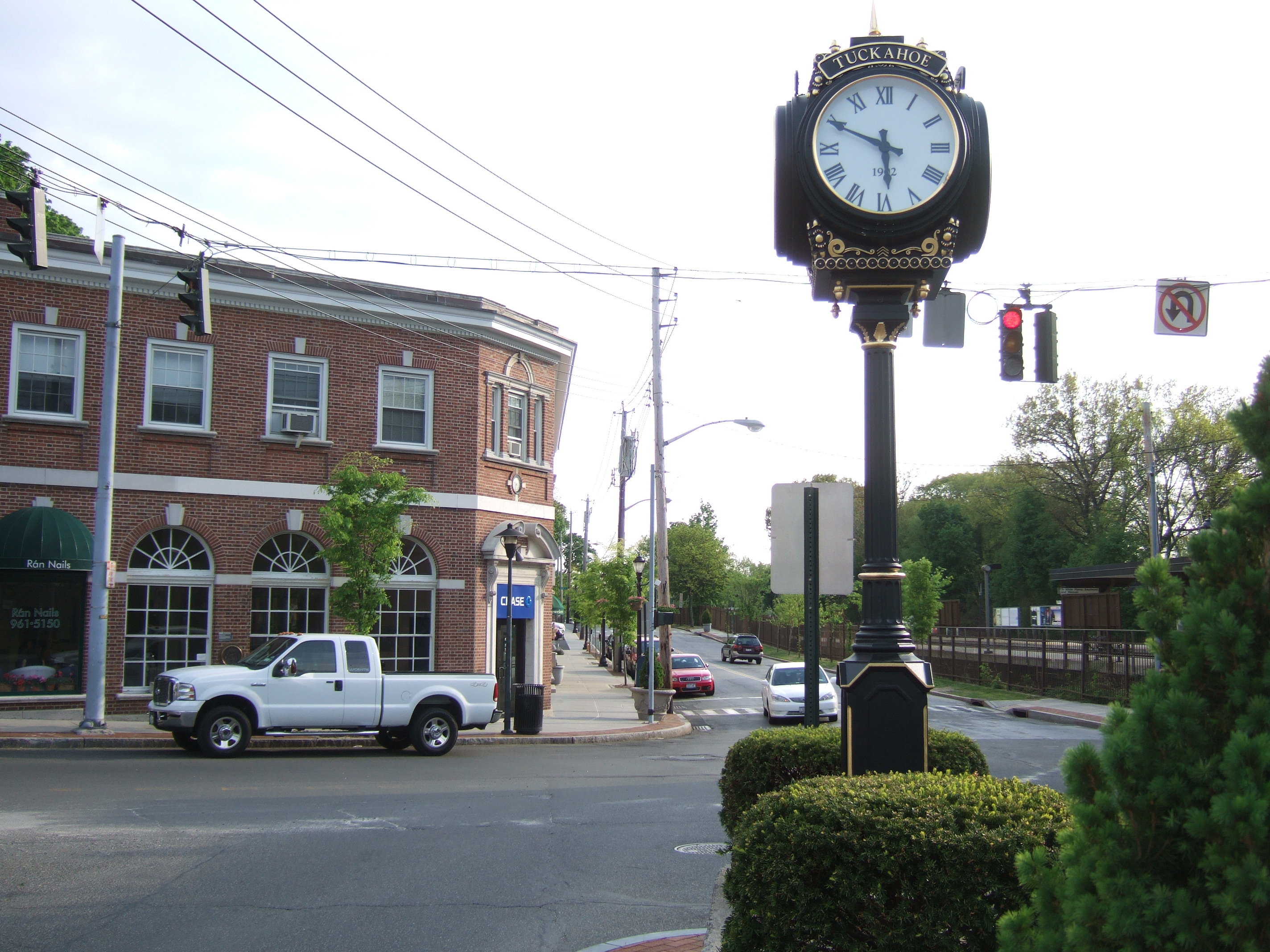
- Commercial district near Crestwood Station

- Flag Seal

- Location of Tuckahoe (village), New York
- Coordinates: 40°57′11″N 73°49′25″W
- Country: United States
- State: New York
- County: Westchester
- Town: Eastchester
- Incorporated: 1903

Government
  - Mayor: Cara Kronen

Area
  - Total: 0.60 sq mi (1.56 km^{2})
  - Land: 0.60 sq mi (1.56 km^{2})
  - Water: 0 sq mi (0.00 km^{2})
- Elevation: 112 ft (34 m)

Population (2020)
  - Total: 7,084
  - Density: 11,786.6/sq mi (4,550.85/km^{2})
- Time zone: UTC−5 (Eastern (EST))
  - Summer (DST): UTC−4 (EDT)
- ZIP Code: 10707
- Area code: 914
- FIPS code: 36-75583
- GNIS feature ID: 0967924
- Website: www.tuckahoe.com

Tuckahoe /tʌkəˈhoʊ/ is a village in Westchester County, New York, United States. One-and-a-half miles long and three-quarters of a mile wide, with the Bronx River serving as its western boundary, the Village of Tuckahoe is approximately sixteen miles north of midtown Manhattan in southern Westchester County. As of the 2010 census, the village's population was 6,486.

The village can be reached by the Metro-North railroad system.

== History ==
The name "Tuckahoe," meaning “it is globular," was a general term used by the Native Americans of the region when describing various bulbous roots which were used as food.

Throughout the 1700s and 1800s, Tuckahoe was a rural, minor community that was part of the larger town of Eastchester. The land in the Tuckahoe area was farmed by tenants of Philipsburg Manor.

=== Revolutionary War ===
During the American Revolutionary War, the area was part of the infamous "neutral ground" of Westchester County, a no-man's land between British-controlled territory to the south and American lines to the north. Lacking formal military protection, residents were vulnerable to devastating raids from both sides.

Ward House (also spelled Ward's House), the home of local Patriot leader Stephen Ward, functioned as a local inn and tavern. It was a crucial intelligence post during the war and briefly served as the site of the British headquarters shortly before the Battle of White Plains. Notable military engagements took place at Ward House on October 23, 1776, and March 16, 1777. It was burned by British troops in 1778, but was rebuilt in the early 1790s to its original specifications, with a rebuilt version still standing today (located at 230 White Plains Road).

=== Industry and growth ===
It was not until the early nineteenth century that Tuckahoe first became a semi-prominent part of the New York metropolitan area upon the discovery of vast, high-quality, white marble deposits near the Bronx River by Scottish businessman Alexander Masterson. Through the use of his financial wealth and influence, Masterson started Tuckahoe's marble industry, its first quarry in 1812. The high quality of "Tuckahoe Marble" was in great demand, quickly transforming the once quiet village into the "marble capital of the world". In the 1840s, to serve quarry owners who transported marble to the city, the New York and Harlem Railroad opened two train depots in Tuckahoe. The booming industry drew succeeding waves of German, Irish and Italian immigrant workers, and, after the Civil War, African-Americans who migrated from the South. The Tuckahoe quarries produced heavily for almost a century before supplies dwindled and the industry ended. The village's Church of the Immaculate Conception was constructed for the predominantly Catholic population using Tuckahoe Marble.

During the 1920s Burroughs Wellcome (now part of GlaxoSmithKline) established research and manufacturing facilities on Scarsdale Road on land acquired from the Hodgman Rubber Company, and for many years was a leading industry in Tuckahoe until the company moved to Research Triangle Park in North Carolina in 1971. The Nobel Prize winning scientists Gertrude B. Elion and George H. Hitchings worked there and invented drugs still used many years later, such as the cancer and autoimmune disease suppressant mercaptopurine.

== Geography ==
Tuckahoe village is located at the lower, central section of Westchester County. Tuckahoe is bordered by the village of Bronxville to its south and the unincorporated portion of the town of Eastchester to the north and east. The Bronx River separates it from the Crestwood section of Yonkers to its west. Easily accessible roadways include the Bronx River Parkway, White Plains Road (Route 22), the Major Deegan Expressway (I-87), the Hutchinson River Parkway, and the Cross County Parkway.

According to the United States Census Bureau, the village has a total area of 0.6 square miles (1.6 km^{2}), all land.

== Demographics ==
Historical population
Census	Pop.	Note	%±
1910	2,722		—
1920	3,509		28.9%
1930	6,138		74.9%
1940	6,563		6.9%
1950	5,991		−8.7%
1960	6,423		7.2%
1970	6,236		−2.9%
1980	6,076		−2.6%
1990	6,302		3.7%
2000	6,211		−1.4%
2010	6,486		4.4%
2020	7,084		9.2%
U.S. Decennial Census

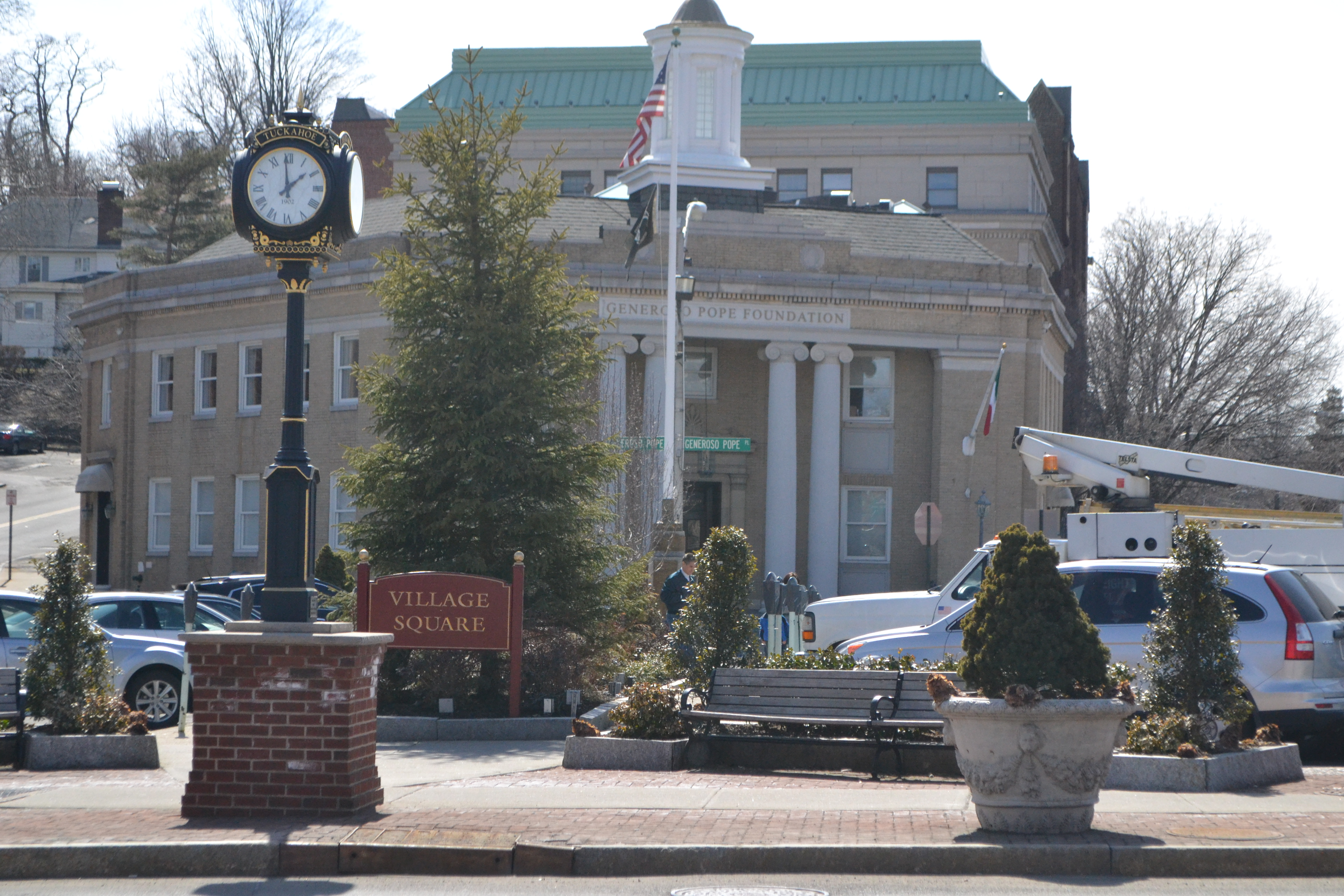
Village square and downtown

As of the census of 2010, there were 6,486 people, 2,855 households, and 1,657 families residing in the village. There were 3,122 housing units. The racial makeup of the village was 67.5% White, 10.2% African American, 12.1% Hispanic or Latin of any race, 8.2% Asian, 1.7% from two or more races, 0.2% from other races, and 0.1% Native American.

There were 2,627 households, out of which 29.4% had children under the age of 18 living with them, 42.0% were married couples living together, 12.7% had a female householder with no husband present, and 42.0% were non-families. In total, 37.3% of all households were made up of individuals, and 27.9% had someone living alone who was 65 years of age or older. The average household size was 2.27 and the average family size was 3.04.

In the village, the population was spread out, with 23.7% under the age of 20, 4.7% from 20 to 24, 29.3% from 25 to 44, 18.9% from 45 to 64, and 15.3% who were 65 years of age or older. The median age was 40 years. The male population represented 46.4% of the population whereas females accounted for 53.6% of the population.

The median and mean incomes for a household in the village was $68,648 and $129,406, respectively, and the median income for a family was $92,250. Approximately 14.7% of the village population earned income of $200,000 or more and the per capita income for the village was $56,057. About 1.1% of families and 3.9% of the population were below the poverty line, including 0.0% of those under age 18 and 2.9% of those age 65 or over.

== Notable people ==
- Al Carapella, football player
- Robert Creamer, sportswriter
- Tom Creavy, golfer, winner of 1931 PGA Championship
- Connie Kay, drummer
- Eric Naposki, National Football League player
- David Osit, documentary filmmaker
- Robert Seguso, professional tennis player

== In popular culture ==
The village was fictionally represented as the setting of the CBS sitcom Maude from 1972 to 1978.
