= Susie M. Barstow =

American painter (1836–1923)

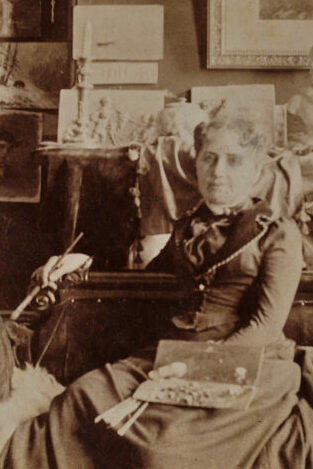
- Born: May 9, 1836; New York City, US
- Died: June 12, 1923 (aged 87); New York City, US
- Resting place: Green-Wood Cemetery
- Education: Rutgers Female Institute of New York City
- Known for: Painting
- Movement: Hudson River School

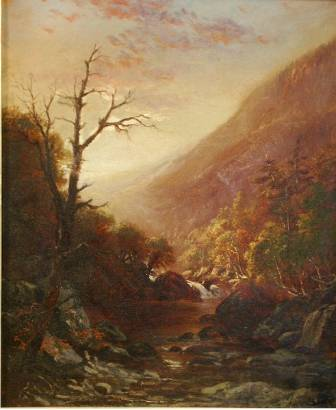
Kaaterskill Creek, c. 1870

Susie M. Barstow (May 9, 1836 – June 12, 1923) was an American painter associated with the Hudson River School who was known for her luminous landscapes.

== Biography ==
Susie M. Barstow was the daughter of old-time New York City tea merchant Samuel Barstow (1805-1884) and Mary Tyler Blossom (1813-1895), whose lineage traces back to one of the original passengers of the Mayflower. She was born on May 9, 1836. She studied at the Rutgers Female Institute in New York, the first college for women in New York City, graduating in 1853, and received additional artistic training in Europe. For a number of years she taught at the Brooklyn Institute of Arts and Sciences.

Barstow's mature landscapes exude serenity and are infused with light. During her career, she was often cited in exhibitions as "Miss SM Barstow," and signed her paintings "SM Barstow." She exhibited at the National Academy of Design from 1858, the Brooklyn Art Association, and the Pennsylvania Academy of the Fine Arts among other venues. Barstow's A Bit of Catskill Woods was in the collection of American art patron Thomas B. Clarke between 1872 and 1879. At the time, women artists did not have the same opportunities to exhibit their work as male artists did, so her work remained relatively little known until art historians began to reassess women artists of the Hudson River School.

Her work was included in the 2010 survey exhibition "Remember the Ladies: Women of the Hudson River School" at the Thomas Cole National Historic Site in Catskill, New York and the 2019 exhibition "The Color of the Moon: Lunar Painting in American Art" at the Hudson River Museum in Yonkers, New York, where Barstow was a featured artist alongside works by Thomas Cole, Albert Bierstadt, and George Inness among others. In 2023, the Thomas Cole National Historic Site's exhibition Women Reframe American Landscape: Susie Barstow & Her Circle/ Contemporary Practices offered the first retrospective on Barstow's work, placing it in dialogue with contemporary artists who challenge concepts of landscape. Complementing the exhibit, art historian Nancy Siegel published the biography Susie M. Barstow: Redefining the Hudson River School (2023), which drew on archival sources including letters, diaries and sketchbooks held by her family.

Barstow, an early member of the Appalachian Mountain Club, was an avid hiker who climbed hundreds of mountains in New York and New England — including all the principal peaks of the Catskills, White Mountains, and Adirondacks — as well as the Alps and the Black Forest in Europe. She often went on expeditions along the Hudson River and in the mountains that combined hiking with sketching and painting. Finding women's dress of the era cumbersome and impractical, Barstow developed a hiking costume that included sturdy boots and shortened skirts paired with trousers (a combination advocated by the rational dress movement). Barstow never married.

Her niece Susie B. Skelding also became an artist and illustrator, and the two went on sketching expeditions together.

Susie M. Barstow is buried at the Green-Wood Cemetery in the Brooklyn borough of New York City.
