= Alice Wellington Rollins =

American writer

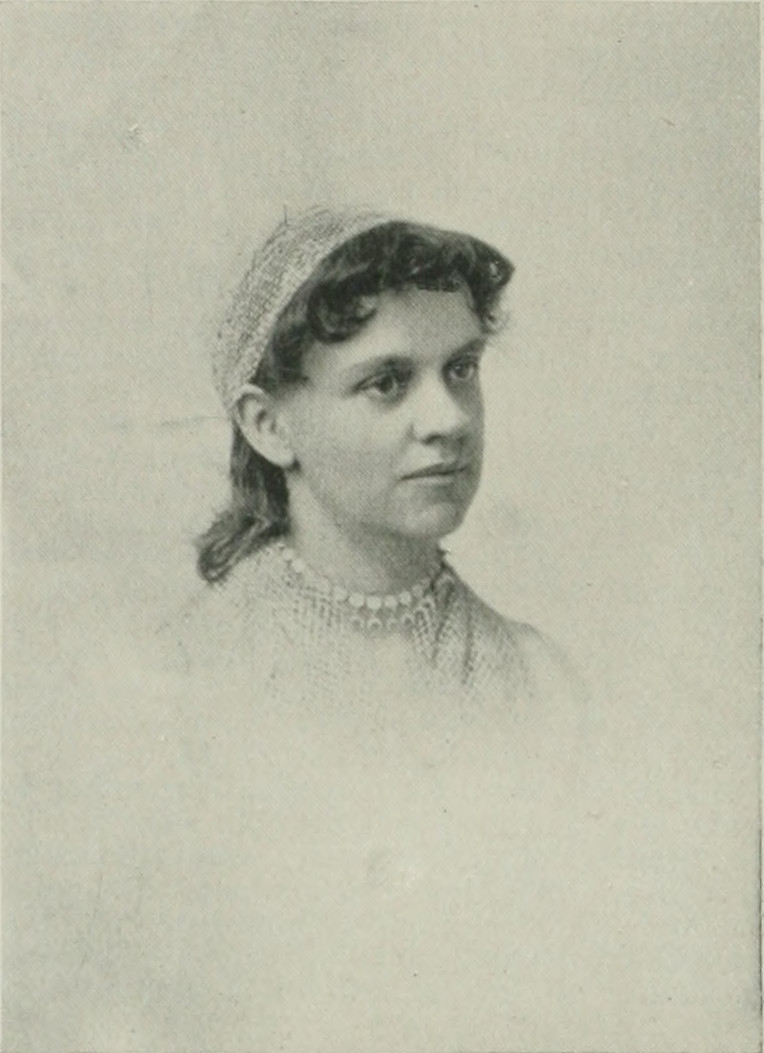
"A Woman of the Century"

Alice Wellington Rollins (June 12, 1847 – December 5, 1897), was an American writer whose output spanned essays, novels, stories, and children's poetry. She became known for a series of articles on the terrible conditions in New York tenements in the 1880s and for travel writing about the American West.

== Family and education ==
She was born Alice Wellington in Boston, Massachusetts; her father was Ambrose Wellington. She was educated by her father in Latin and math before attending various schools. In 1876 she married Daniel M. Rollins of New York City; they had a son. For a time they lived in Lawrence Park, a development in Bronxville that attracted many artists and writers.

== Career ==
Rollins contributed articles, profiles, and reviews to leading American periodicals, including Lippincott's Magazine, Cosmopolitan Magazine, The Century Magazine, Harper's Magazine, and the North American Review. She also worked as an editor, wrote children's stories and poetry for publications like St. Nicholas Magazine, and compiled a collection of aphorisms. A series of essays on New York tenements provided the inspiration for her 1888 novel Uncle Tom's Tenement. She wrote frequently about traveling in the American West, and two of her books feature western settings — The Three Tetons is set in Yellowstone Park and The Story of a Ranch in Kansas.

When she died, the writer Kate Douglas Wiggin wrote this in tribute: "Her literary work was brilliant, vigorous, original, poetic, by turns."

== Publications ==
Poetry

- My Welcome Beyond, and Other Poems (1877)
- The Ring of Amethyst (1878)
- From Snow to Sunshine (1889; illustrated by Susie Barstow Skelding)
- The Story of Azron (1895)
- Little Page Fern and Other Verses (1895)

Novels

- The Story of a Ranch (1885)
- All Sorts of Children (1886)
- The Three Tetons: A Story of the Yellowstone (1887)
- Uncle Tom's Tenement (1888)

Other

- Aphorisms for the Year (1897)
- The Finding of the Gentian (1895; story collection)
- From Palm to Glacier (1895; travel writing)
