= Lawrence Park Historic District =

Historic district in New York, United States

- U.S. National Register of Historic Places
- U.S. Historic district
- New York State Register of Historic Places
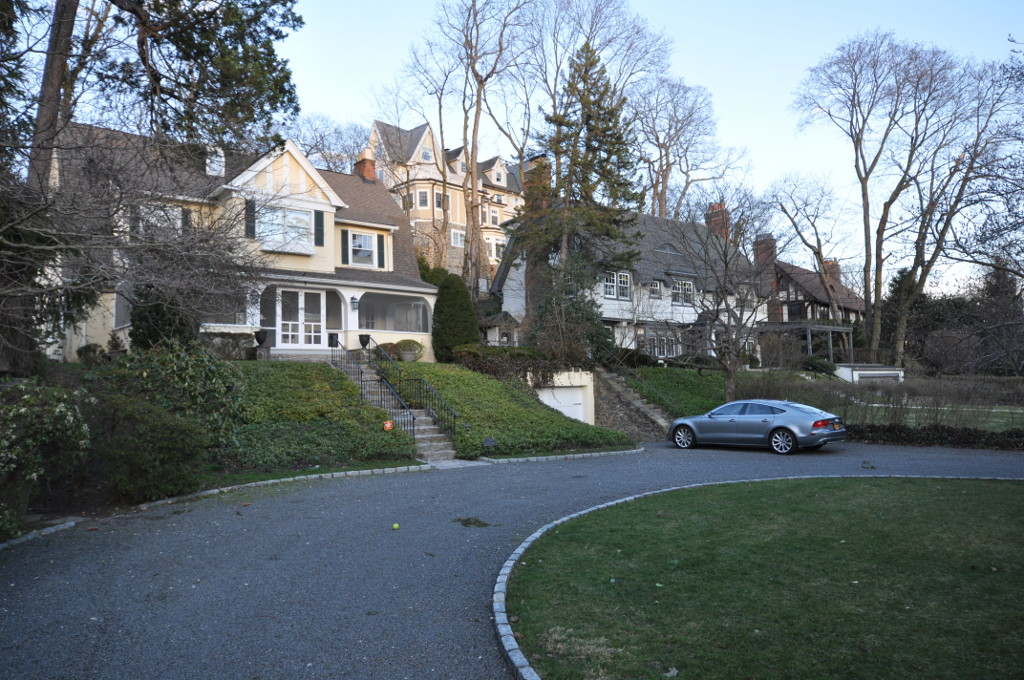
- Houses on Garden Avenue

- Location within New York Location within the United States
- Location: Roughly bounded by Side Hill, Prescott, Kensington, Garden and Chestnut Ave., Maidens Ln, Valley and Pondfield Rds., Bronxville, New York
- Coordinates: 40°56′27″N 73°50′19″W
- Area: 20 acres (8.1 ha)
- Built: 1891
- Architect: Bates, William A.; Multiple
- Architectural style: Colonial Revival, Classical Revival, Shingle, Tudor Revival
- NRHP reference No.: 80002788
- NYSRHP No.: 11952.000234

Significant dates
- Added to NRHP: January 23, 1980
- Designated NYSRHP: June 23, 1980

Lawrence Park Historic District is a national historic district located at Bronxville, Westchester County, New York. The district contains 94 contributing buildings, the majority of which are architecturally or historically significant. Developed in the late nineteenth and early twentieth century on twenty acres of land closely associated with the historical evolution of the surrounding community, the area attracted as residents many prominent artists and writers of the period. The Park structures were built on a wooded hillside, along winding roads. While in close proximity to one another, they achieve a feeling of seclusion and privacy. Few of the houses have had major alterations, and today Lawrence Park retains much of its original character.

Lawrence Park was added to the National Register of Historic Places in 1980. The district is primarily residential and representative of early suburban growth outside New York City. Bordering Lawrence Park to the south and west is the commercial section of the Village of Bronxville, or village center, with Pondfield Road running down the center. Newer residential areas lie north and east of the district, sharply delineated by changes in terrain.

== Significance ==
Lawrence Park Historic District is architecturally, historically, and culturally significant. William Van Duzer Lawrence, Lawrence Park's developer, personally oversaw the design and construction of the first homes in Lawrence Park and encouraged well-known artists and writers to make Lawrence Park their home, including artists Otto Henry Bacher, Hobart Nichols, and William Thomas Smedley, and writers Tudor Jenks, Kate Douglas Wiggin, Edmund Clarence Stedman, and Alice Wellington Rollins. Many of these residents were also prominent in the cultural, social, and political realm of the Village of Bronxville. In spite of intrusions and alterations to buildings within the district over time, the ambiance of Lawrence Park has not changed. Lawrence Park still retains the coherence and character of an architecturally distinctive turn-of-the-century suburban development.

== History ==
The twenty acres now included in the boundaries of Lawrence Park, which is within the Village of Bronxville, Town of Eastchester, are a part of a large parcel of land deeded to Thomas Pell. Pell received it from four chiefs of the Mohican tribe — Gramatan, Annale, Wariatipus, and Wampage — and he in turn deeded it, in 1664, to ten families from Fairfield, Connecticut. Laws for the area were established in 1665 under an agreement called the Eastchester Covenant. This document, unusual for its time, made provisions for the education of children, the disposition and upkeep of property, the support of a minister, and the regulation of all public affairs.

During the eighteenth century a community began to grow because of the proximity of the Bronx River, a source of power and transportation. Pre-Revolutionary settlers included the Underhill family who originally owned much of the land in the west part of what is now the Village and operated a saw and grist mill on the river. From this family came the community's first name — Underhill's Crossing. In the 1820s, a vein of fine white marble was discovered in nearby Tuckahoe, attracting more people to the area. Underhill's Crossing's rapid development was stimulated by the arrival of the railroad in 1844. The former Underhill mill was purchased by James Swain, whose father-in-law, James Minot Prescott, bought farm land on Sunset Hill — 86 acres of the original Underhill holdings. Prescott built the Manor House on his land in 1845.

Lawrence Park was created by William Van Duzer Lawrence (1842-1927), who, in 1890, purchased the 86 acre Prescott farm, with the idea of subdivision and development. He commissioned William A. Bates to design several houses on speculation. The first new houses in Lawrence Park were completed in 1891 and were built in a variety of revival styles including Colonial Revival, Classical Revival, Shingle and Tudor Revival.

Lawrence, who founded Bronxville's Sarah Lawrence College in 1928 in memory of his wife, had become a millionaire through astute business dealings in the pharmaceutical trade. Charmed by the rural character of a village only fifteen miles from New York City, he initially bought the land as a long-term property investment. A year later, however, he engaged an engineer to prepare maps, a necessary preliminary to putting buildings on the site. Lawrence took great personal care, as roads were surveyed and lots plotted, to protect the large trees and other natural features of the property. He then chose four of the most picturesque sites and hired the architect William A. Bates, who had just successfully completed a group of "cottages" at Tuxedo Park, to design four houses to be built on speculation.

Bates, born in 1853 in Michigan, came to New York City at the age of nineteen to train as an architect, while working as a draftsman in the offices of Herter Brothers. By 1880 his designs for houses were appearing in architectural journals around the country. An article in the May, 1970, issue the Bronxville Women's Club magazine "The Villager" states, "Bates belonged to...the school of architects who worked in what one writer terms the "High Victorian Picturesque Eclectic" manner, drawing details from French and Spanish Romanesque, late French Gothic, Victorian Gothic of Italian inspiration, sixteenth-century castles on the Loire, Second Empire Norman, even early Christian Syrian monuments. Bates' early work was said to be very English... But his Bronxville tower houses seem to be more French than English...the important thing is not the historical accuracy of the design but the architect's art in harmonizing whatever his fancy leads him to, with itself and with its surroundings."

The first four houses sold quickly and the new owners were in residence by June, 1891. Lawrence then had Bates renovate and modernize the Manor House, and it became an Inn. Rooms at the Manor House were available to prospective purchasers of Lawrence Park lots, to people who had bought land and wanted to stay nearby while their houses were being built; and to friends and guests of Lawrence Park residents. A second amenity for Park dwellers was the now-demolished Bates-designed Casino, used for meetings and social gatherings of all kinds. Interest in the Park was high, the Manor House was full, and Bates, under Lawrence's direction, continued to design. As the houses sold, it was found that the area was meeting a housing demand from artists and authors of New York City. Studios and libraries had to be added to existing houses and incorporated into the plans for new ones for artists such as William Henry Howe, Herman T. Schladermundt, William T. Smedley, a well-known illustrator and Otto Bacher.

With such a concentration of persons in the arts, it was not long before Lawrence Park acquired the reputation of being "an exclusive literary and artistic development." In 1896, Mrs. George Custer, widow of the general and interested in becoming part of this exclusive development, bought a lot and commissioned Bates to design the first of the two houses she eventually built in Lawrence Park. Some of the houses Lawrence built were put up for political, not social or economic reasons. When he discovered that the taxes paid by Bronxville residents were being used by the Town of Eastchester to develop Tuckahoe, Lawrence recognized that Bronxville had to be incorporated to have its own government. In order to accomplish incorporation, the Village had to give evidence of three hundred people within its boundaries. Heads were counted, but the population was not sufficient; so in the winter of 1897 Lawrence built seven larger houses for big families that would require many servants. When the new homes had been sold, noses were again counted, and Bronxville was able to incorporate.

The great charm of the development lay primarily in the architecture of the houses and their relationship to the environment. In a 1904 article in Architectural Record, Theodore Tuttle stated "The houses belong where they are placed, as if they had grown there and were content to remain, and the general effect is tranquil refinement." These houses, taken as a group, today represent in practically unspoiled form all the major styles that were in fashion at the turn of the century. Romantic and fanciful, they were designed for a time of more leisurely living. "Among them are examples of the traditional half timber and stucco, the Colonial Revival, and the now famous 'Shingle Style,' which reflects the spirit, if not the letter, of Henry Hobson Richardson's Romanesque Revival. Translated into wood, Romanesque, which is essentially an architecture of stone, becomes picturesque, rambling, and varied. Its salient features are high roofs and high gables, often with half timbering, wide porches, and corner towers, all of which can be observed in various combinations in houses in Lawrence Park."

By 1901, a good number of the houses in the Park were completed. The greater portion were designed by Bates, whose "...designs were meant for country living, with their wood and stone constructions suited admirable to their lovely hillside settings. Strung along narrow winding roads and perched on rocky ledges, they offered their owners the advantage of privacy combined with great natural beauty." Bates' influence in Bronxville extended beyond the Park. He was responsible for the design of much of the commercial area of the Village, as well as the Mission style Hotel Gramatan, of which only the shopping arcade now remains, on which he collaborated with A.E. Barlow.

== Residences and Artists ==
=== 25 Prescott Avenue ===
Typical of the early homes built in the Park is the residence at 25 Prescott Avenue, built in 1891. The home was designed by Bates and serves as a fine example of the Shingle style with its undulating surfaces, diamond-paned fenestration, and gable roof. It was first acquired by Will Hicok Low, noted figure painter, muralist, and designer of stained glass. The house features a trap door in the floor of Will Low's former studio, which was useful to the artist in working on top sections of his paintings without using a ladder, as well as for canvas storage. The studio itself boasts large windows allowing for natural light. Within the chimney of the fireplace within the studio, there is a plaster medallion created by American sculptor Augustus St. Gaudens depicting the novelist Robert Louis Stevenson, who wrote many infamous works such as Treasure Island. Low had previously connected Stevenson and St. Gaudens. Below the medallion is a poem by Robert Louis Stevenson entitled "Lines to Will H. Low". Family friends have remembered visiting the home and seeing "murals spread across the studio floor", as well as "[the studio] was covered from floor to ceiling - you couldn't even see the wallpaper." The house was lived in continuously by artists until 1965.

==== Mary and Will Low ====
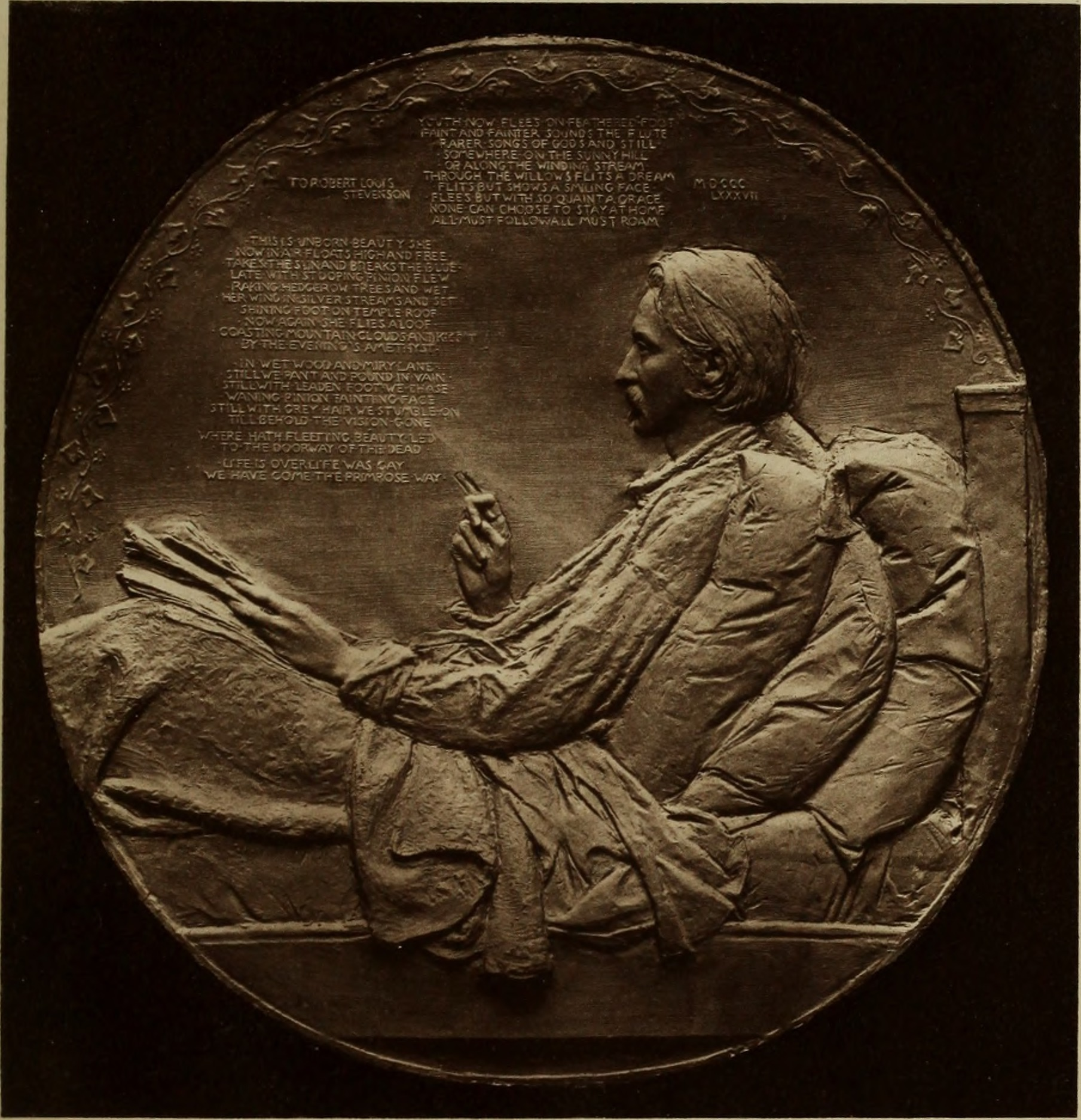
The Saint-Gaudens medallion depicting Robert Louis Stevenson; Built into the chimney of Low's studio at 25 Prescott Avenue

In 1897, Will Low worked on a wall panel for the Waldorf-Astoria Hotel in NYC, which was his first major commission. The mural was set to be installed on the ceiling of the hotel, and was a lofty 34' by 26'. It is said that Will Low's final painting, a mural he created to be gifted to the local Bronxville School, was completed hours before his passing.

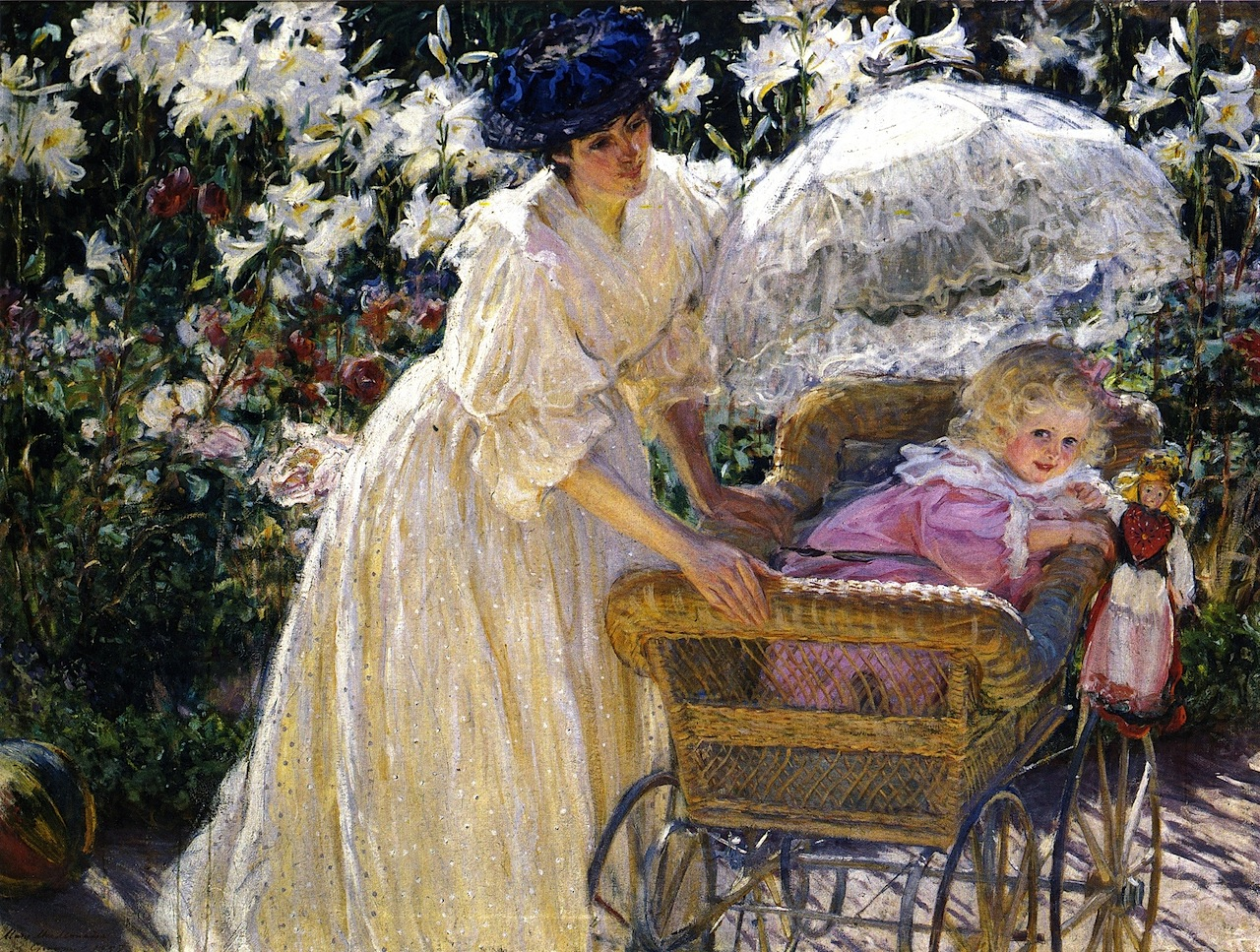
"Roses and Lilies" by Mary Fairchild MacMonnies Low

Will Low's second wife, Mary MacMonnies Low, was also a prominent figure in the art world. Following a divorce from her first husband, Scottish-American sculptor Frederick MacMonnies, Mary married Will Low, who had been an admirer of hers for some time. She moved from Paris to America with her daughters in 1910, and lived at 25 Prescott Avenue with her new husband for the rest of her life. In her youth, she studied at the St. Louis School of Fine Arts, eventually being awarded a three-year scholarship at the Academie Julian. In 1901, she was elected president of the American Woman's Art Association. While married to her first husband Frederick MacMonnies, she lived in a home at Giverny, often remembered as the grounds of impressionist artist Claude Monet. The home was known for its landscaping and workshops. The home's aesthetics influenced many of her impressionist paintings from this era of her life. In 1902, she was awarded the Julia Shaw prize from the Society of American Artists. Four years later in 1906, she became an Associate of the National Academy of Design.

Mary's marriage to Will Low was described as a happy one. Will's second autobiography, A Painter's Progress, writes to Mary, "This is the life we have chosen well, the choice was mad, but I should make it again." The couple lived in the Lawrence Park home until they died, with Will passing first in 1932, and Mary over a decade later in 1946. w

=== 26 Prescott Avenue ===
26 Prescott Avenue, a Victorian Tudor home, was built in 1896 out of stone and wood. Its earliest resident was William Winthrop Kent (1860–1955), architect and brother of Edward Austin Kent. The home was designed strategically for the lot, as it was mostly rocky terrain; most of the rooms face South, as to best capture shade and sunshine at various times of the year. It featured an oval-shaped dining room, as well as bottle glass windows. It was first called Oak Ridge Cottage, though, has been re-remembered as the Owl House, due to the large owl figurine that sits atop the roof. The huge pieces of stone in the lower part of the structure are said to have been quarried by men who were paid by the cubic foot. According to Tuttle in the Record, "Oak Ridge...while not the most pretentious in appearance, probably excites interest more than any other house in the park, and more firmly impresses itself on the mind. It is a beautiful structure, irregular and rambling, as it should be, but so well held together, withal, that it may be viewed and judged in its entirety." Years later, when artist William Thomas Smedley moved in, he added a second large studio onto the house. He maintained a studio in New York City and his home in Bronxville with two studios. In 1916 Smedley added a garage to the home which was one of the first to be built in Lawrence Park. He also had Kent, both the architect and former resident, add in a secret passage leading from one of the main rooms to his studio. Allegedly, this allowed him a quick escape during his wife's frequent parties. Since Smedley's death in 1920, "Owl House" has been lived in by prominent writers, most recently Brendan Gill of the New Yorker.

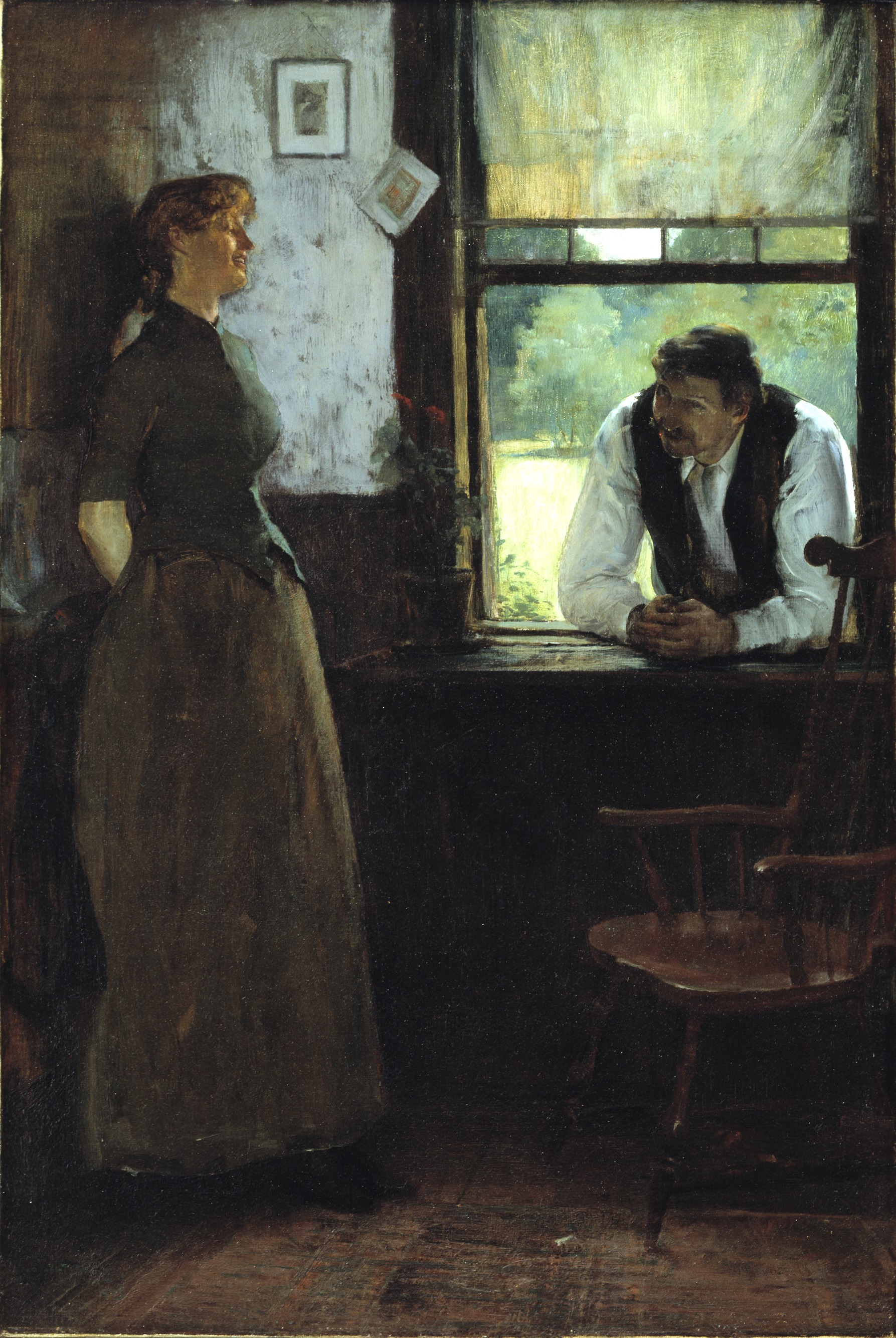
"One Day in June" by William Thomas Smedley, 1909

==== William Thomas Smedley ====
William Thomas Smedley was a resident of Bronxville between the years of 1896 and 1920. During these time, he lived at 26 Prescott Avenue. He was recognized for his illustrations in the beginning of his career, and by the end, was an infamous commission painter for the wealthy residents of nearby New York City. He was born into a religious family, the son of a Quaker minister. In 1873, he was sent to Westchester, Pennsylvania to work at a local news outlet. There, he was encouraged by executives of the paper to take his talents to Philadelphia's Pennsylvania Academy of the Fine Arts. There, he studied under Thomas Eakins, an American painter and photographer. He also studied in Paris at the Academie Julian under Jean Pail Laurens. His works included several portraits of Congress members, as well as Supreme Court Justices. Some of his works have been included in the Library of Congress, as well as the National Gallery of Art. Smedley was elected to the National Academy in 1905.

=== 12 Sunset Avenue ===
"Gray Arches" at 12 Sunset Avenue was designed by Bates and built in 1891. The house is sited on one of the highest points in Lawrence Park Historic District and derives its name from the unusual design of the stone work on the porch which rests solidly on an outcropping of granite, overlooking the valley. The house and its environment provide a prime example of how the natural landscape has been treated with reverence, giving the homes an organic compatibility with their wooded surroundings. In 1892 "Grey Arches" was the summer home of the Lawrence family, and during the winter of 1894, it was the home of Kate Douglas Wiggin, author of Rebecca of Sunnybrook Farm, who described it in her autobiography as "...a beautiful house."

=== 28 Valley Road ===
At 28 Valley Road is the "Pacesetter House," designed by architect Henry Eggers in 1952. It was built on the site of the 1895 William Kent residence, who designed the Bronxville Village Hall as well as several houses in the Park. The Kent House was in the Shingle style and the newer residence, which won the 1953 House Beautiful award is also constructed of shingles with the pitched roof and rambling lines of the surrounding neighborhood architecture. The original Kent barn was used as a garage and decorative motifs from the barn are a notable feature of the interior design of the Eggers house.

=== 16/18 Prescott Avenue ===
16/18 Prescott Avenue was designed by William A. Bates and Kenneth How. It is a Tudor Revival home. The two addresses are mirrors of each other, and were three stories high in the front, but six stories high in the back. The backs of the homes featured private gardens. During the 1950s, an elevator was added into the 18 Prescott Avenue side, along with the addition of a private driveway. It is considered one of the more unusual homes in Lawrence Park. It was built on top of where the Prescott estate barn had previously stood. William Van Duzer Lawrence at one point gifted 16 Prescott to Anna Lawrence Bisland and 18 Prescott to Louise Lawrence Meigs, his two daughters. Though, they never moved in. Forty years later the home was separately purchased by Louise Lawrence Meigs' daughters, Lytle and Lucia Andrews, who then lived in the home next to each other.

== See also ==
- National Register of Historic Places listings in southern Westchester County, New York
