= Grayson L. Kirk =

American political scientist

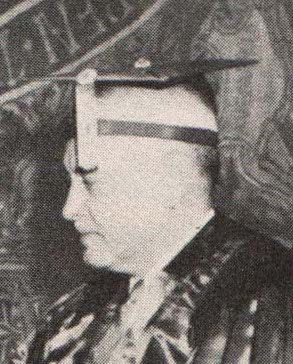

14th President of Columbia University
- In office 1953–1968
- Preceded by: Dwight D. Eisenhower
- Succeeded by: Andrew W. Cordier

Personal details
- Born: Grayson Louis Kirk; October 12, 1903 Jeffersonville, Ohio, U.S.
- Died: November 21, 1997 (aged 94) Yonkers, New York, U.S.

Grayson Louis Kirk (October 12, 1903 – November 21, 1997) was an American political scientist who served as president of Columbia University during the Columbia University protests of 1968. He was also an advisor to the State Department and instrumental in the formation of the United Nations.

== Early life ==
Kirk was born to a farmer and schoolteacher in Jeffersonville, Ohio. He originally intended to become a foreign correspondent, but fell into educational administration when he served briefly as a high school principal in New Paris, Ohio, during his senior year at college. He graduated from Miami University in 1924, earned an M.A. in political science from Clark University in 1925, and studied at the École Libre des Sciences Politiques in 1929 before completing a Ph.D. in the discipline at the University of Wisconsin–Madison in 1930. While a student at Miami, Kirk became a brother of the founding chapter of the Phi Kappa Tau fraternity. During his graduate studies, he edited his fraternity's national magazine, The Laurel, to earn money for tuition. He married the former Marion Sands, a schoolteacher and daughter of an official of the B&O Railroad, in 1925. They raised one son, John Grayson.

After receiving his doctorate, Kirk spent the next decade on the faculty of the University of Wisconsin–Madison. He completed postdoctoral research at the London School of Economics in 1937.

== Columbia University ==
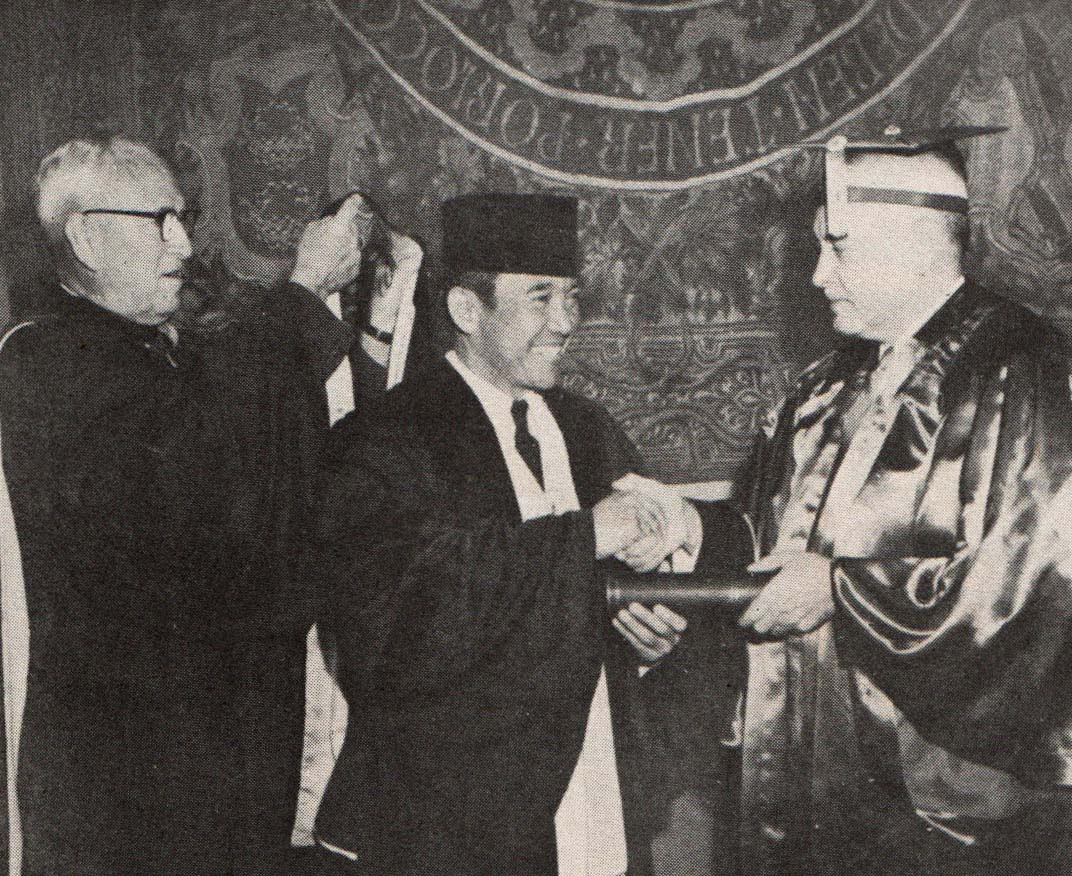
Kirk (right) granting an honoris causa degree to Sukarno (1956)

In 1940, Kirk was appointed to the faculty of Columbia University as an associate professor of government. He was promoted to full professor in 1943 and began a long association with the U.S. government when he served in the Security Section of the United States Department of State's Political Studies Division during World War II. Kirk became involved in the formation of the United Nations Security Council, attending the Dumbarton Oaks Conference and the United Nations Conference on International Organization where the United Nations Charter was signed.

Dwight D. Eisenhower appointed Kirk as the university's provost in 1949. In 1951, when Eisenhower took leave to serve as Supreme Allied Commander Europe, Kirk became acting president of the university. He assumed the presidency in earnest in 1953 after Eisenhower was sworn in as President of the United States.

During his tenure at Columbia, he quadrupled the university's endowment, added a dozen new buildings to the Morningside Heights campus, and doubled the university library's holdings. However, the university's academic standing gradually eroded during his tenure vis-à-vis such ascendent institutions as Stanford University and the Massachusetts Institute of Technology, leading historian Robert McCaughey to characterize the epoch as the "afternoon on the Hudson."

Early in his tenure, Kirk was elected to the American Philosophical Society (1954) and the American Academy of Arts and Sciences (1959). Also in 1959, Kirk entered Columbia into its relationship with the Institute for Defense Analyses, which would draw much fire from the anti-war movement, particularly the Students for a Democratic Society, nearly a decade later.

Prior to the 1968 disturbances, Kirk received honorary degrees from a number of institutions, including the University of Wisconsin–Madison (1953), Yale University (1953), Harvard University (1954), the University of North Dakota (1958), Bates College (1964) and Waseda University (1965).

The university and Kirk came under fire in 1967 for attempting to patent and promote a "healthier" cigarette filter developed by New Jersey chemist Robert Louis Strickman. Questions regarding the filter's effectiveness began to surface just before Kirk was to testify before Congress as to its benefits.

Kirk's relationship with the student body began to degenerate in the early 1960s as students got caught up in the civil rights and anti-war movements and began to protest openly on campus. In 1959, Kirk started to pursue the construction of a gymnasium suitable for intercollegiate sports competition. Construction was delayed for several years due to lack of funds, during which time community resentment over the university's crowding out its poorer neighbors festered. When construction began in February, 1968, Harlem community activists and civil rights figures protested vigorously enough for the university to fence off the site and post a police guard.

The 1968 Columbia University protests began on April 23, when student protesters began what would become an eight-day occupation of five university buildings and the president's office. Students were protesting the university's affiliation with the Institute for Defense Analyses and its plans to construct a new gymnasium in Morningside Park that had one entrance for Columbia students and faculty and another entrance for members of the neighboring West Harlem community, who would not have access to all of the facilities. Kirk initially agreed to address some of the protesters demands, but ultimately filed trespass charges against them and called in police to clear the occupied buildings. After the incident, Kirk resisted calls for his resignation, but stayed away from graduation and eventually announced his retirement before the start of the next academic year.

In 1974, a newly constructed gymnasium finally opened.

== Later years ==
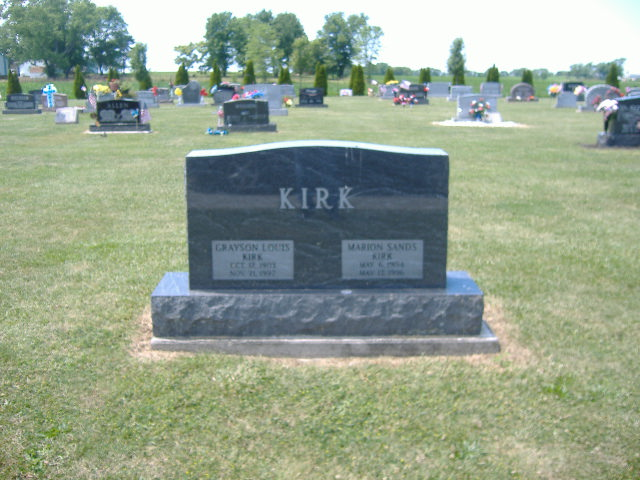
Grave of Grayson L. Kirk and his wife Marion Sands Kirk at Fairview Cemetery in Jeffersonville, Ohio.

After relinquishing the presidency, Kirk completed terms on the Council on Foreign Relations and the Association of American Universities, serving as president of the former organization until 1971.

He also remained on Columbia's full-time faculty as the Bryce Professor of the History of International Relations, a position he had held since 1959, before retiring in 1973. Kirk served as president emeritus and trustee emeritus until his death and "would continue to help raise money for the university."

Kirk died in his sleep at the Plashbourne Estate, where he had resided since 1973, in Yonkers, New York in 1997. He is buried next to his wife Marion Sands Kirk (May 6, 1904 – May 17, 1996) at Fairview Cemetery in Jeffersonville, Ohio.

== See also ==
- The Strawberry Statement

== Notes ==
Academic offices
Preceded by Dwight D. Eisenhower	President of Columbia University; 1953–1968	Succeeded by Andrew W. Cordier
