= Susie Barstow Skelding =

American illustrator

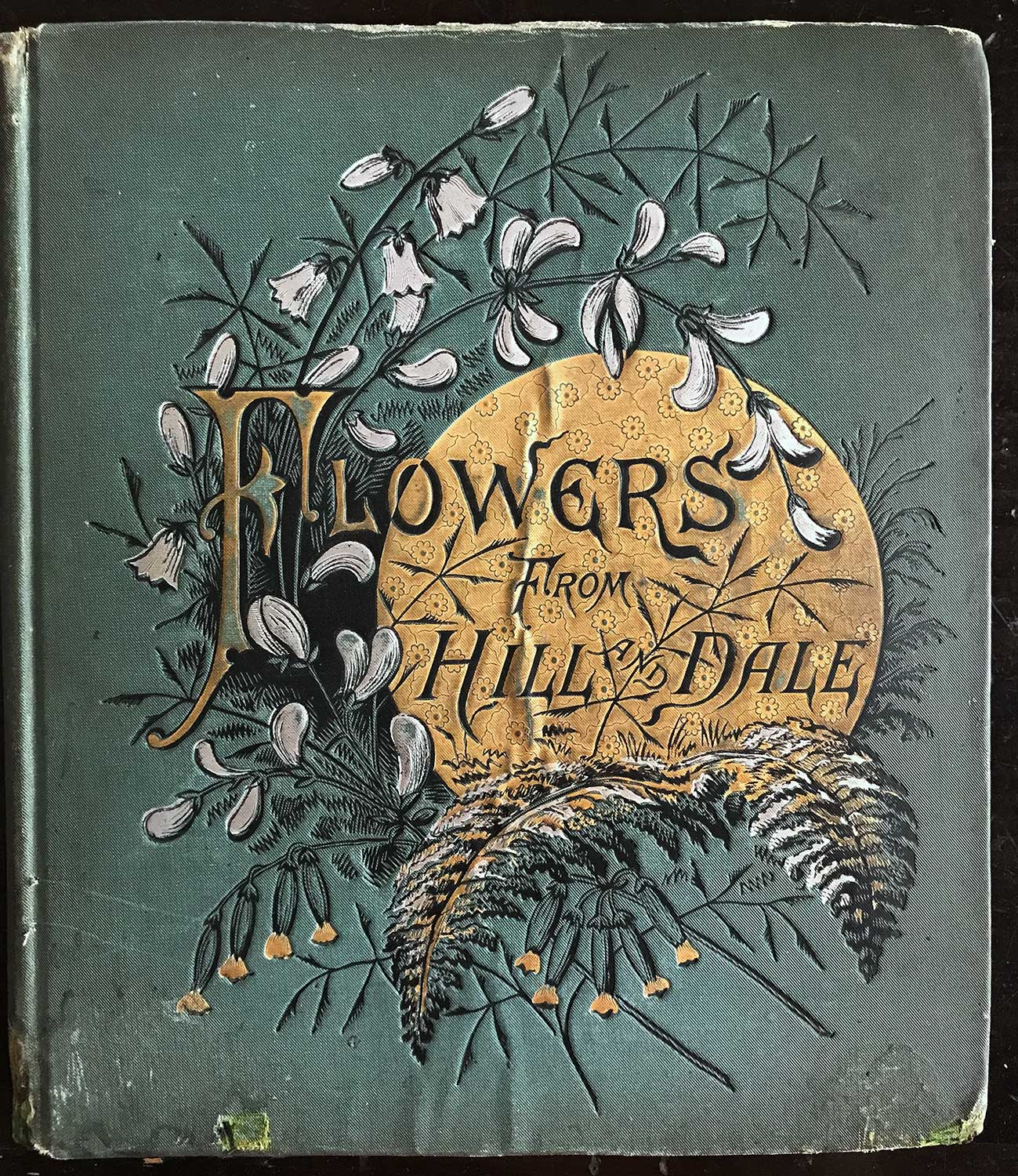
Cover of Susie Barstow Skelding, Flowers from Hill and Dale, 1883.

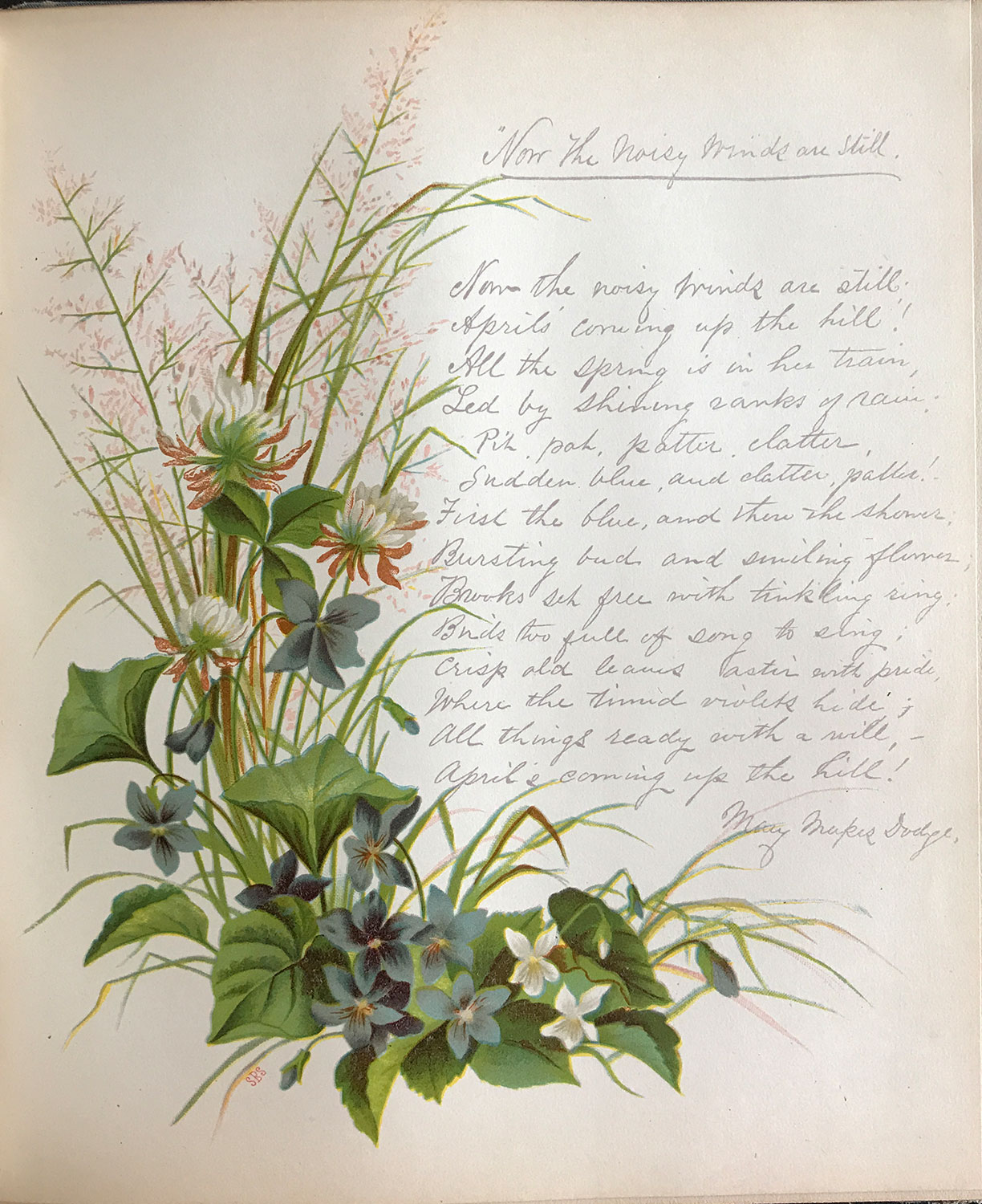
Susie Barstow Skelding's color plate of violets and white clover framing a handwritten poem by Mary Mapes Dodge; from her 1883 book Flowers from Hill and Dale.

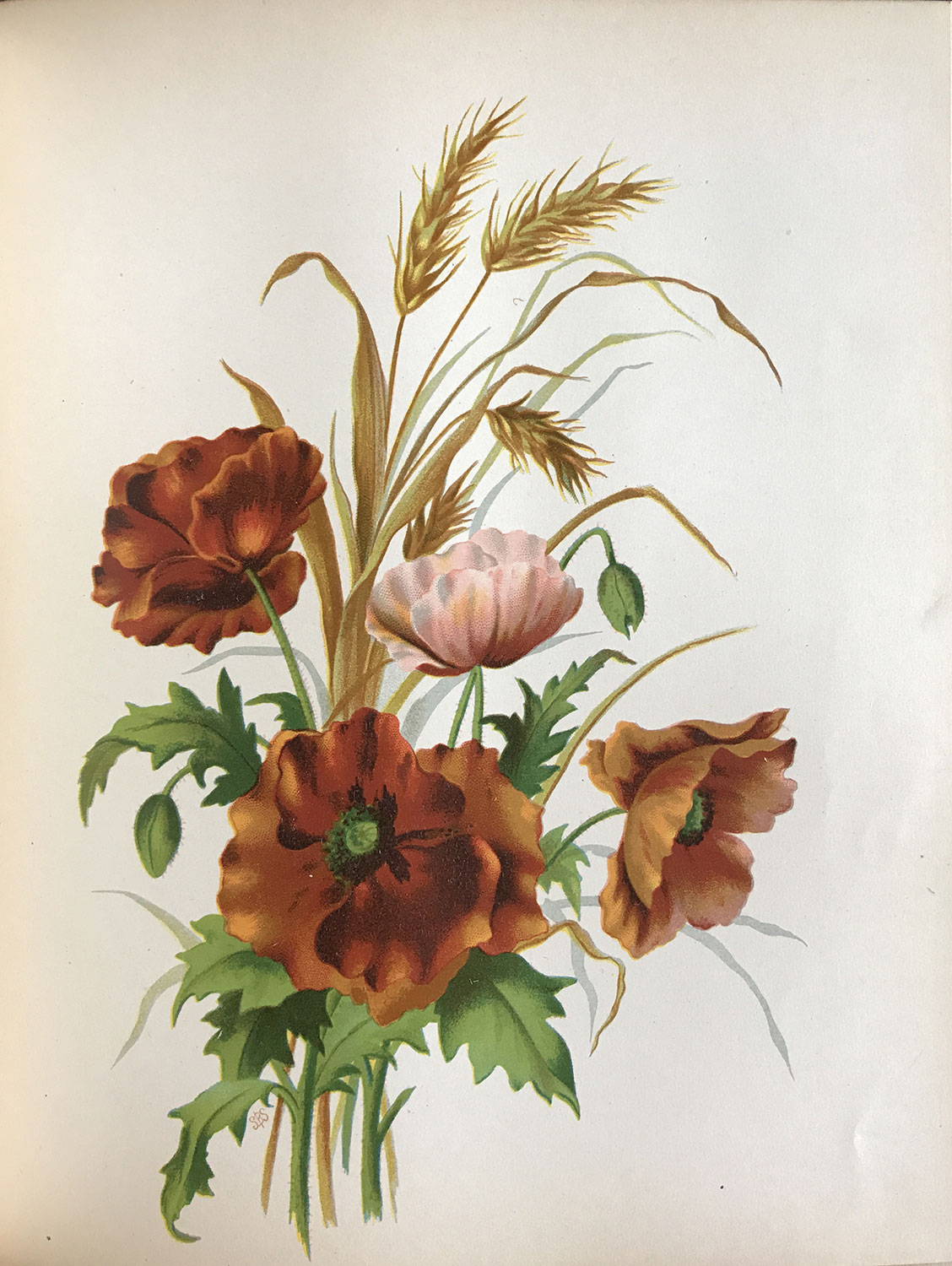
Color plate of poppies and wheat from Susie Barstow Skelding, Flowers from Hill and Dale, 1883.

Susie Barstow Skelding (1857–1934), was an American illustrator who produced several popular series of books in which her illustrations were paired with poetry by well-known authors.

== Biography ==
Susie Barstow Skelding was the daughter of Ann Marie Barstow and James Augustus Skelding and the niece of the landscape painter Susie M. Barstow. She was a member of the Brooklyn Art Club.

In the 1880s, she produced several series of books in which her full-color illustrations of flowers accompanied her selections of poetry by various authors, including John Greenleaf Whittier, Julia Ward Howe, Alice Wellington Rollins, Helen Hunt Jackson, Celia Thaxter, James G. Percival, William Dean Howells, Mary Mapes Dodge, and Elaine Goodale.

The popular "Flower Songs" series is perhaps the best known of these. In some cases, the books' color plates included handwritten poems framed by Skelding's floral designs. A number of the books she produced, such as Songsters of the Branches, were ribbon-bound.

Skelding also chose the poems for a series of books featuring birds; these were illustrated by the artist Fidelia Bridges.

== Books ==
'Seasons' series

- Spring Blossoms (1885)
- Midsummer Flowers (1885)
- Flowers for Winter Days (1885)

'Flowers from' series

- Flowers from Hilly Dale (1883)
- Flowers from Here and There (1885)
- Flowers from Dell and Bower (1886)
- Flowers from Sunlight and Shade
- Flowers from Glade and Garden

"Flower Songs" series

- Songs of Flowers' (I; ca. 1883)
- A Handful of Blossoms (II; ca. 1883)
- Maple Leave and Golden Rod (III)
- From Moor and Glen (IV)
- A Bunch of Roses (V)
- Pansies and Orchids (VI; 1884)
- Roses and Foreget-Me-Nots (VII; 1884)
- Heartsease (VIII)
- Wayside Flowers (IX)

Books illustrated by Fidelia Bridges

- Birds of Meadow and Grove (1886)
- Songsters of the Branches (1886)
- Birds and Blossoms and What the Poets Sing of Them (1887)
- Winged Flower Lovers (1888)
- Harbingers of Spring (1888)
- Familiar Birds and What the Poets Sing of Them (1886)

Other books

- Easter Flowers (1883)
- Easter Bells (1885)
- Bits of Distant Land and Sea (ca. 1888)
- Under Italian Skies (1888)
- From Snow to Sunshine (1889; by Alice Wellington Rollins)
- Birthday Flowers (1891)
