= William Van Duzer Lawrence =

American businessman and philanthropist (1842–1927)

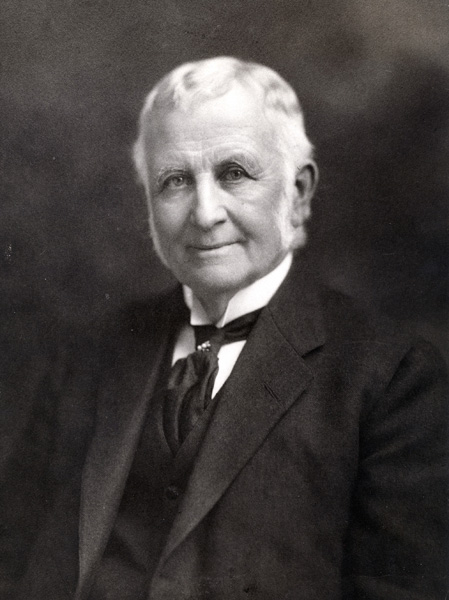
- Born: 1842
- Died: 1927 (aged 84–85)
- Known for: Founder of Sarah Lawrence College
- Spouse: Sarah Lawrence
- Children: 5

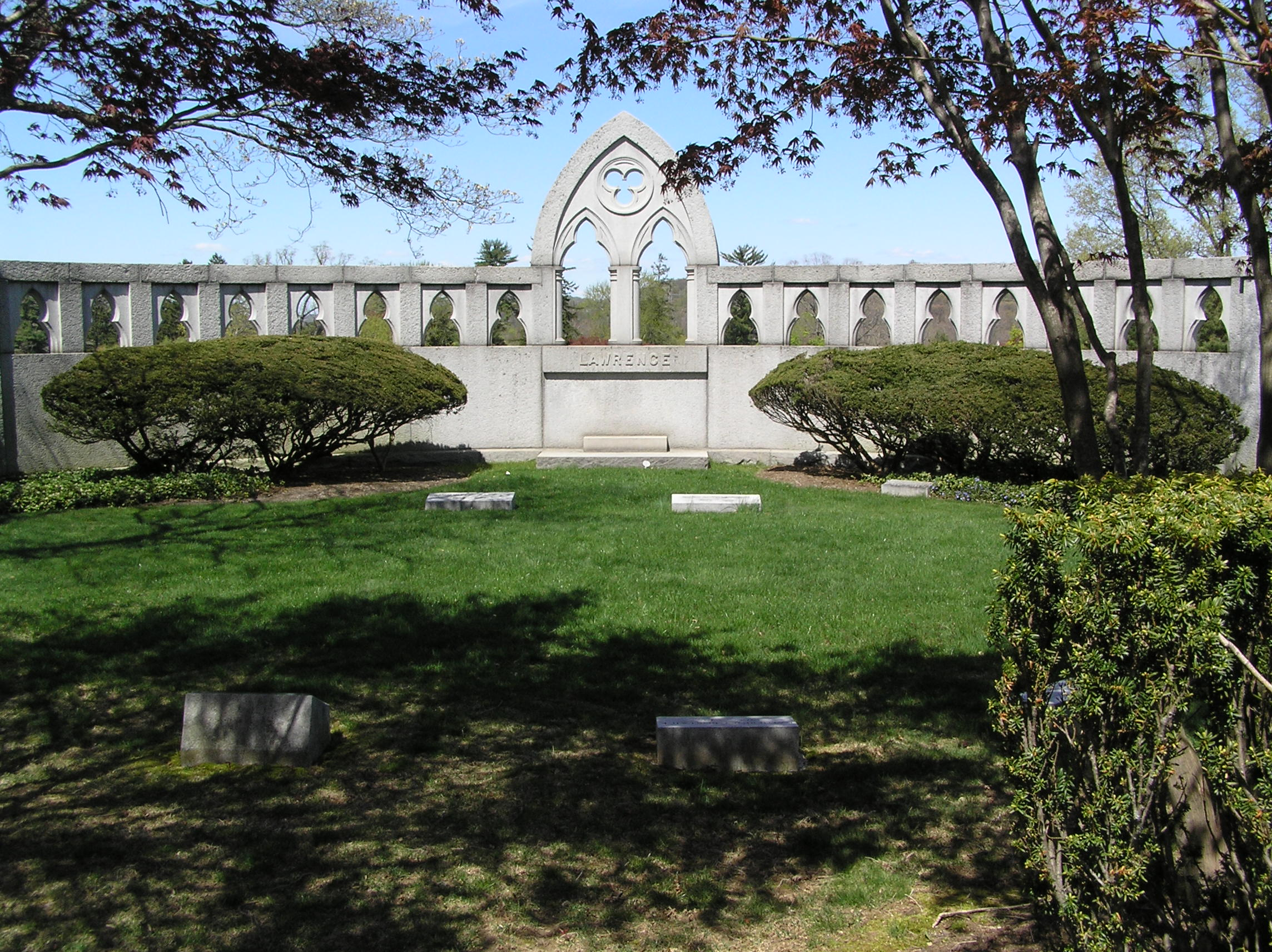
William VanDuzer Lawrence burial site

William Van Duzer Lawrence (1842–1927) was an American millionaire real-estate and pharmaceutical mogul who is best known for having founded Sarah Lawrence College in 1926 and Lawrence Hospital in 1909. He played a critical role in the development of the community of Bronxville, New York, an affluent suburb of New York City defined by magnificent homes and charming garden apartments in a country-like setting. His name is attached to the Lawrence Park Historic District and real estate brokerage Houlihan Lawrence. Lawrence is buried at the Kensico Cemetery in Valhalla, New York.

== Development of Bronxville, New York ==
Lawrence used his wealth to pursue a wide variety of entrepreneurial and philanthropic enthusiasms. One of these was the development of real estate. In 1889, at the suggestion of his brother-in-law, he came out on the New York and Harlem Railroad to the small village of Bronxville to examine the prospects of a former farm of approximately 86 acres (350,000 m^{2}) near the railroad station. He appreciated the possibilities of the property and its convenient location and purchased the entire property the following year. He envisioned a planned community of well-designed and well-built suburban homes. The lots were relatively modest in size and irregular in shape. They were not intended to be estates for the rich but sites large enough for comfortable middle-class homes, each planned to take advantage of the natural setting. The narrow, meandering roads were laid out to follow the contours of the land, and existing trees were preserved whenever possible.

He hired an architect by the name of William Augustus Bates to design the first houses of the development, to be called 'Lawrence Park'. Bates had a versatile style that borrowed freely from the many different styles in fashion at the turn of the 20th century. He favored certain features such as large bays with multiple windows and round or octagonal towers with conical roofs. The first houses sold quickly and Bates went on to design most houses in the neighborhood.

The development soon proved to be a success, and within a couple of decades most of the original property was developed and Lawrence bought more land to extend its boundaries. The newer sections were designed primarily in the Tudor Revival or Colonial Revival style; however, Bates' nineteenth-century blends of Romantic forms remain the most admired. The Lawrence Park Historic District was added to the National Register of Historic Places in 1980.

Lawrence's business plan was designed to attract a friendly, homogenous population of upper-middle-class residents - professionals, business managers, and the like. The development proved particularly attractive to established artists who were successful commercial painters, illustrators, and sculptors. It soon became a community within a community, very close-knit and proud of its special qualities.

It was never intended to be socially or economically diverse. Even its complex of townhomes, Merestone Terrace, was designed and constructed to much higher standards than ordinary multi-family housing in order to attract more affluent clients. Limiting most construction to one-family homes on large lots helped to discourage people of limited financial means from settling there. It was hoped that these measures, combined with restrictive covenants or "gentleman's agreements," would maintain the white, Protestant, affluent, suburban character for decades. There was nothing subtle or hidden about this agenda. Lawrence Park proudly advertised in House and Garden in 1925: "Restrictions? Yes! Bronxville has been carefully guarded in its development.... The index of desirability has always been character, culture, and the ability to fit easily and naturally into the social scheme."

== Contributions ==
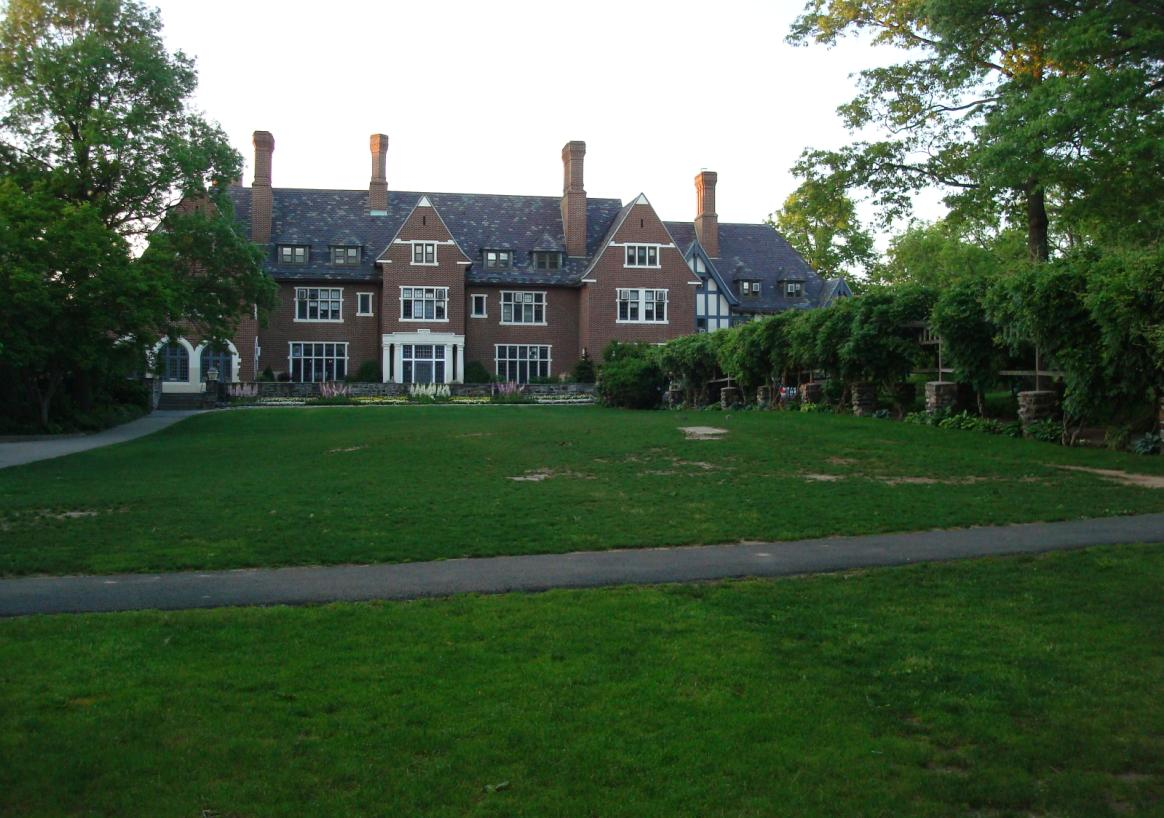
The Lawrence estate home "Westlands," now an administrative building and dormitory at Sarah Lawrence College

William Van Duzer Lawrence left behind several significant institutions including Sarah Lawrence College and Lawrence Hospital. One of his legacies directly was connected to Lawrence Park: Houlihan Lawrence, one of the nation's larger real estate firms, is a direct descendant of Lawrence Park Realty Company.

- Sarah Lawrence College - Founded in 1926 on the grounds of his estate, the college is named in honor of his wife, Sarah. From its inception, the college was intended to provide instruction in the arts and humanities for women. Its pedagogy, modeled on the tutorial system of Oxford University, combined independent research projects, individually supervised by the teaching faculty, and seminars with low student-to-faculty ratio – a pattern it retains, despite its cost, to the present.

Followed by Bennington College, Sarah Lawrence was the first liberal arts college in the United States to incorporate a rigorous approach to the arts with the principles of progressive education, focusing on the primacy of teaching and the concentration of curricular efforts on individual needs.

- Lawrence Hospital - This institution was created when Lawrence's son Dudley nearly died en route to a hospital in neighboring New York City.

Lawrence embodied ideas from the Progressivist movement of the 1890s, especially his view that the arts were a crucial element in the social evolution of individuals and families in developing both private and public sensibilities as well as creating equal relations between men and women.

== Family ==
William and Sarah Lawrence had five children: Alice (1868-1869), Louise Lawrence Meigs (1870-1965), Arthur W. Lawrence (1875-1937), Anna Lawrence Bisland (1873-1950), and Dudley B. Lawrence (1880-1970). Anna and her husband, Pressley Bisland, were the foster parents of poet Lawrence Ferlinghetti, who had been left at their Plashbourne Estate by his maternal aunt—the Bisland's French governess. The Lawrence children and grandchildren continued to run their father's real estate business until 1990 when it was acquired by another local family.

The Lawrence family boasts an impressive ancestry said to descend from Sir Robert Lawrence of Ashton Hall, Lancashire, England, who accompanied Richard Coeur de Lion in the Third Crusade. John Lawrence, who arrived at Plymouth, Massachusetts in 1635, was a patentee of Hempstead, New York under Dutch governor William Kieft and served as a three-term mayor of New York City. William Lawrence (1620–82), along with John, held additional patents and settled a large portion of present-day Flushing and Bayside in Queens. Another notable ancestor was War of 1812 martyr Captain James Lawrence, whose dying wish, "Don't give up the ship," is immortalized in American history.

== Additional sources ==
- Horowitz, Helen Lefkowitz. Alma Mater: Design and Experience in the Women's Colleges from Their Nineteenth-Century Beginnings to the 1930s. Amherst: University of Massachusetts Press, 1993 (2nd edition).
- Jackson, Kenneth T. (1985). Crabgrass frontier: The suburbanization of the United States. New York: Oxford University Press. ISBN 0-19-504983-7. OCLC 11785435.
