= Plashbourne Estate =

Historic house in New York, United States

- U.S. National Register of Historic Places
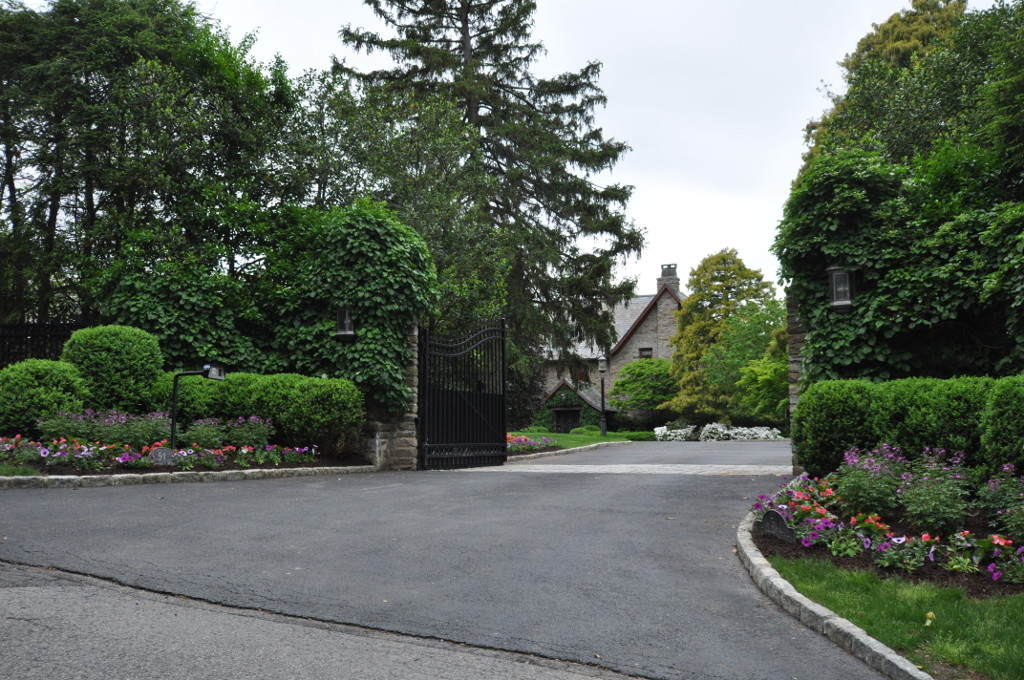

- Location within New York Location within the United States
- Location: 51 Carlton Rd., Yonkers, New York
- Coordinates: 40°56′20″N 73°50′52″W
- Area: 2.5 acres (1.0 ha)
- Built: 1911
- Architect: Carrere, John M.
- Architectural style: Tudor Revival
- NRHP reference No.: 07000777
- Added to NRHP: August 2, 2007

Plashbourne Estate is a historic estate located in the Lawrence Park West section of Yonkers, Westchester County, New York. It was designed in 1911 by the architectural firm of Carrère and Hastings and built for artist Violet Oakley (1874–1961) in the Tudor Revival style. It is a 2 1/2-story stone building with an irregular compound plan and cross-gabled roofline. After 1915, it became the home of Anna Lawrence Bisland (1872–1950), third daughter of William Van Duzer Lawrence, who resided there until her death. Grayson L. Kirk (1903–1997) resided at Plashbourne Estate from 1973 until his death.

It was added to the National Register of Historic Places in 2007.
