= List of bus routes in Westchester County, New York =

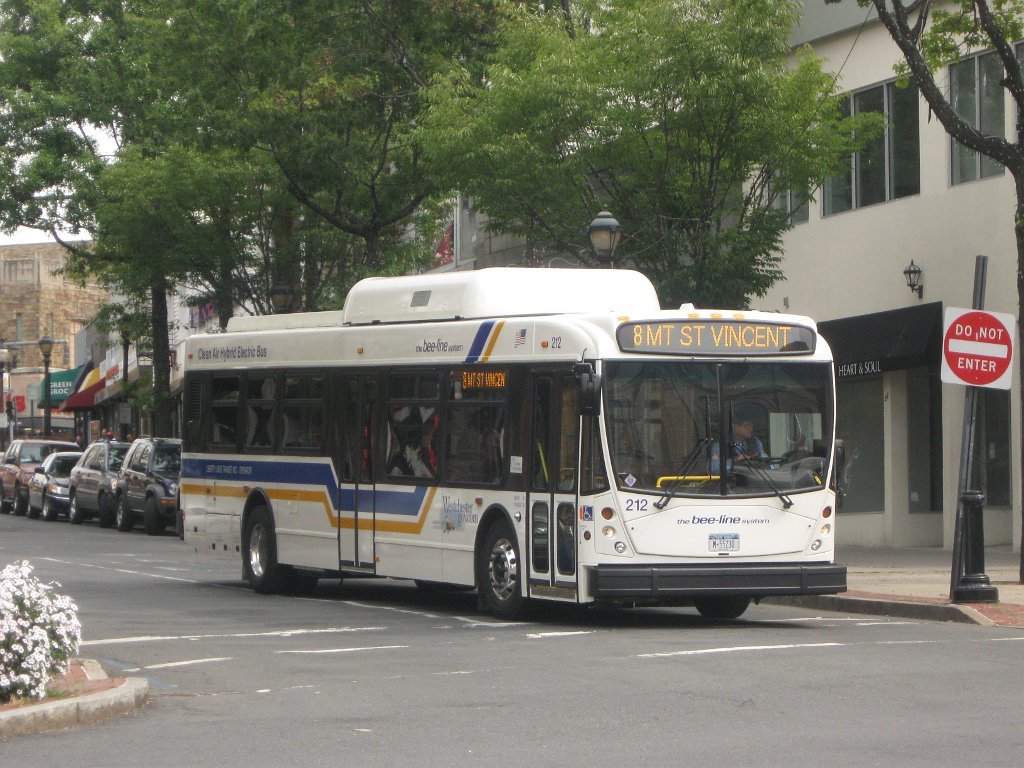
#212 on the 8 line coming out of Getty Square in Yonkers.

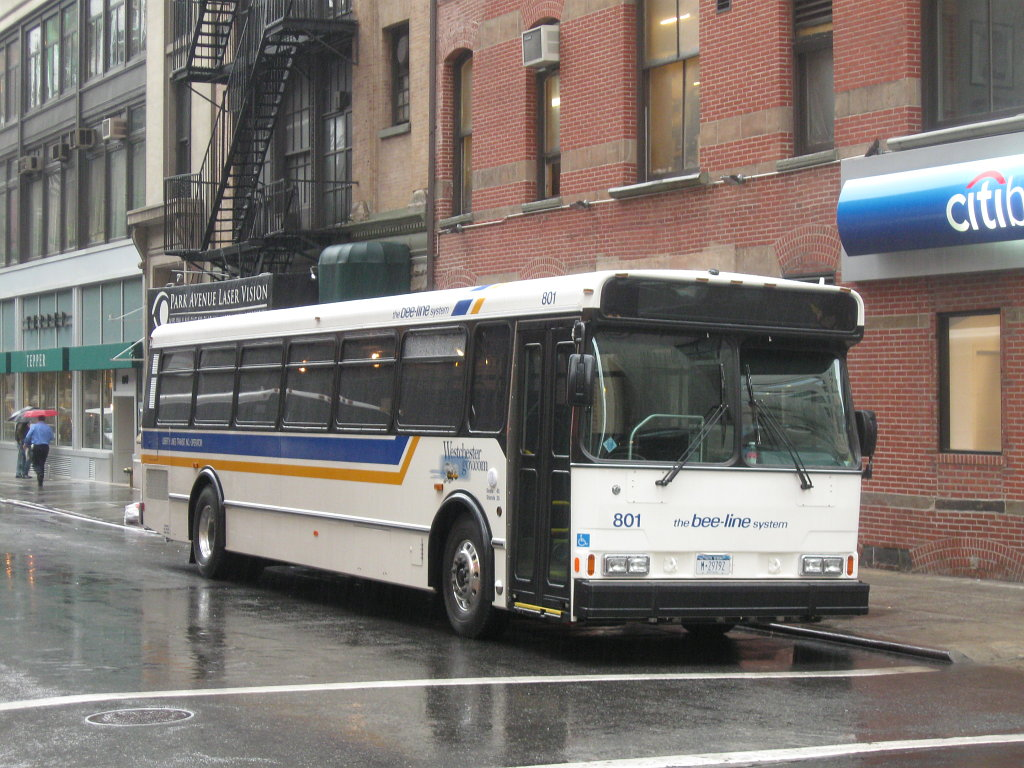
Single-door bus used primarily on the routes BxM4C, 43, and 77. Also used occasionally on 10, 11 and shuttle loops.

The Bee-Line Bus System, the bus system for Westchester County, operates a network of bus routes throughout Westchester County, serving destinations throughout much of the county and parts of The Bronx in New York City. Routes are sometimes identified with a "W" prefix for Westchester County (ex: W60), following the same system used by the MTA. This is most evident at bus stops in the Bronx and on some maps and other publications from the MTA and the New York City government. They are also sometimes identified with the "BL" prefix (ex: BL60 or B-L60) on some MTA maps and signage. Bee-Line does not officially use this nomenclature, with the exception of the BxM4C. These routes are listed below.

This table gives details for the Bee-Line routes. For details on non-Bee-Line routes, see the following articles:

- List of bus routes in the Bronx: Bx16
- List of express bus routes in New York City: BxM3
- Connecticut Transit Stamford: 971 Stamford-White Plains Express
- Leprechaun Lines: Poughkeepsie–White Plains Commuter
- Transport of Rockland: Hudson Link

== Routes ==
The Bee-Line's routes can be classified in several categories, as shown below. All Bee-Line routes accept OMNY.

Connections to New York City Subway stations at the bus routes' terminals are also listed where applicable.

=== Service type ===
Service	Description	Routes
Local	These lines provide local bus transit throughout Westchester County.; Routes operating into the Bronx are closed-door except where noted.	1, 1C, 1T, 1W, 2, 4, 5, 6, 7, 8, 9, 12, 13, 14, 15, 16, 19, 20, 20X, 25, 26, 30, 32, 40, 42, 45, 45Q, 52, 53, 54, 55, 60, 61, 63, 66, 78.
Limited-Stop	Routes run during peak hours only and make few stops along the local route.; The local bus fare is charged on these routes, and OMNY, coins, $1, $2, $5, and $10 bills accepted.	11, 21, 27, 41
Seasonal Service	Routes only operate during Playland Park's operating season.; While route 75 is listed as a local service in its schedule, it makes no stops between Playland and the Rye RR Station.; While route 91 is listed as a limited service in its schedule, it operates as a pick-up only route towards Playland Park and a drop-off only route towards Yonkers.; Route 13 is not a seasonal route, as it operates full-time, however additional seasonal service is provided to Playland during the parks operating season. Some trips serve Playland year round.	13*, 75, 91
Express	Routes run during peak hours only.; The local bus fare is charged on these routes except route BxM4C, and all types of OMNY or coins and $1, $2, $5, $10 bills are accepted.; BxM4C charges $7.75 fare with OMNY, coins, $1, $2, $5, and $10 bills accepted.	1X, 3, 17, 43, 62, 77, BxM4C/28
Commuter (Bus to Rail)	These shuttle routes run between served communities and the indicated railroad station during weekday rush hours only unless otherwise noted.; Select rush hour-only trips on route 66 operate between the Dobbs Ferry RR station and Ardsley Square (operating via Beacon Hill Drive and Ogden Avenue), with one trip from New Rochelle terminating at the Dobbs Ferry RR station instead of Mercy University.	10, 18, 31, 34, 38, 39, 64, 65, 66*, 70, 71
Shuttle Loops	All routes operate rush hours only, and operate from the White Plains Railroad Station during the AM peak hours, and to it in the PM peak hours (except Loop A which operates in both directions to/from White Plains in the mid afternoons and PM rush hours).	A, B, C, D, F, H
School Routes	These routes provide transit for school students getting to school or leaving.; Only school students are allowed to ride on these routes; Route 8 has two trips in each direction on weekdays to/from Roosevelt High School that operate as “Express” trips via Nepperhan Avenue instead of Walnut and Elm Streets.; Route 45Q has one trip in each direction on weekdays to New Rochelle High School which uses Pinebrook Blvd instead of North Avenue.	8*, 45Q*, 401, 402, 403, 404, 405, 430, 440, 441, 448, 460, 461, 462, 463, 465, 466, 467, 468, 470, 472

=== Local ===
Route	Terminals			Major streets traveled	Notes
1	Riverdale, Bronx; 242nd Street and Broadway at Van Cortlandt Park–242nd Street station ( train)	↔	Hastings-on-Hudson; 1 Warburton Avenue at Yonkers city line	Broadway, Warburton Avenue	1C, 1T, and 1W services operate via Hastings-on Hudson and Dobbs Ferry.; 1C service operates via Ardsley.; 1T and 1W service operate via Mercy University (on Broadway) and Irvington.; 1C and 1T services operate weekdays only.; 1W operates weekdays and Saturdays only.; During the weekday PM rush, some trips only run between 242nd Street and Getty Square.; All evening and Sunday trips operate as Route 1 between the Bronx and the Yonkers-Hastings city line only.
1C	Riverdale, Bronx; 242nd Street and Broadway at Van Cortlandt Park–242nd Street station ( train)	↔	Valhalla; Westchester Community College and Westchester Medical Center	Broadway, Warburton Avenue, Saw Mill River Road	1C, 1T, and 1W services operate via Hastings-on Hudson and Dobbs Ferry.; 1C service operates via Ardsley.; 1T and 1W service operate via Mercy University (on Broadway) and Irvington.; 1C and 1T services operate weekdays only.; 1W operates weekdays and Saturdays only.; During the weekday PM rush, some trips only run between 242nd Street and Getty Square.; All evening and Sunday trips operate as Route 1 between the Bronx and the Yonkers-Hastings city line only.
1T	Riverdale, Bronx; 242nd Street and Broadway at Van Cortlandt Park–242nd Street station ( train)	↔	Tarrytown; Tarrytown station	Broadway, Warburton Avenue	1C, 1T, and 1W services operate via Hastings-on Hudson and Dobbs Ferry.; 1C service operates via Ardsley.; 1T and 1W service operate via Mercy University (on Broadway) and Irvington.; 1C and 1T services operate weekdays only.; 1W operates weekdays and Saturdays only.; During the weekday PM rush, some trips only run between 242nd Street and Getty Square.; All evening and Sunday trips operate as Route 1 between the Bronx and the Yonkers-Hastings city line only.
1W	Riverdale, Bronx; 242nd Street and Broadway at Van Cortlandt Park–242nd Street station ( train)	↔	White Plains; City Center	Broadway, Warburton Avenue, Tarrytown Road	1C, 1T, and 1W services operate via Hastings-on Hudson and Dobbs Ferry.; 1C service operates via Ardsley.; 1T and 1W service operate via Mercy University (on Broadway) and Irvington.; 1C and 1T services operate weekdays only.; 1W operates weekdays and Saturdays only.; During the weekday PM rush, some trips only run between 242nd Street and Getty Square.; All evening and Sunday trips operate as Route 1 between the Bronx and the Yonkers-Hastings city line only.
2	Riverdale, Bronx; 242nd Street and Broadway at Van Cortlandt Park–242nd Street ( train)	↔	South Westchester Executive Park	South Broadway, Palisade Avenue, Park Avenue	Off-peak service ends at Tudor Woods in northern Yonkers.; During school days, some northbound morning trips terminate at Park Avenue and Shonard Place.
2	Riverdale, Bronx; 242nd Street and Broadway at Van Cortlandt Park–242nd Street ( train)	↔	Yonkers; DeHaven Drive and Gateway Road at Tudor Woods apartment complex	South Broadway, Palisade Avenue, Park Avenue	Off-peak service ends at Tudor Woods in northern Yonkers.; During school days, some northbound morning trips terminate at Park Avenue and Shonard Place.
4	Bedford Park, Bronx; Bedford Park Boulevard and Jerome Avenue at Bedford Park Boulevard–Lehman College ( train)	↔	Yonkers; Getty Square; Hudson Street	Jerome Avenue, McLean Avenue, South Broadway	Sunday service ends at 9:30 PM.; During school days, selected southbound trips operate to Central Avenue, then via Route 20/21 to either Tuckahoe Road and Central Park Avenue or E.J. Conroy Drive and Main Street. These are internally known as Route 20 trips.; During school days, one trip originates from Roosevelt High School at 3 PM and operates via Route 20 to McLean Avenue, then via its normal route to Getty Square.
5	Yonkers; Getty Square; Riverdale Avenue	↔	Harrison; Oakland Avenue and Halstead Avenue (weekday/Saturday service only)	Nepperhan Avenue, Saw Mill River Road, Tarrytown Road, North Street	Mondays through Saturdays, service operates between Harrison and Getty Square via White Plains.; Alternate trips terminate at White Plains on weekdays.; Select trips terminate at Ardsley Square or Odell Avenue on weekdays and Saturdays.; No Sunday service between White Plains and Harrison.
5	Yonkers; Getty Square; Riverdale Avenue	↔	White Plains; City Center (all other times)	Nepperhan Avenue, Saw Mill River Road, Tarrytown Road, North Street	Mondays through Saturdays, service operates between Harrison and Getty Square via White Plains.; Alternate trips terminate at White Plains on weekdays.; Select trips terminate at Ardsley Square or Odell Avenue on weekdays and Saturdays.; No Sunday service between White Plains and Harrison.
6	Yonkers; Nepperhan Plaza at Yonkers station	↔	Pleasantville; Bedford Road and Wheeler Avenue at Pleasantville station (weekday/Saturday service only)	Broadway, Dobbs Ferry Road, Columbus Avenue	Some weekday rush-hour trips operate via South Westchester Executive Park (from Yonkers station AM, to Yonkers station PM).; The first two weekday AM rush-hour trips to Hastings operate via Westchester Executive Park.; During weekday middays and all-day on Saturdays, every other trip either terminates in White Plains or operates the full route to Pleasantville.; During weekday afternoons, every other trip either terminates in Hastings or operates the full route to Pleasantville. Weekday and Saturday trips departing Yonkers after 5:30 PM either terminate in Hastings or operate as far as White Plains.; No Sunday service between White Plains and Pleasantville.
6	Yonkers; Nepperhan Plaza at Yonkers station	↔	White Plains; City Center (alternate trips)	Broadway, Dobbs Ferry Road, Columbus Avenue	
6	Yonkers; Nepperhan Plaza at Yonkers station	→ PM	Hastings-on-Hudson; Main Street and Warburton Avenue (alternate PM trips)	Broadway, Dobbs Ferry Road, Columbus Avenue	
6	Yonkers; Nepperhan Plaza at Yonkers station	→ AM	South Westchester Executive Park (AM short turns)	Broadway, Dobbs Ferry Road, Columbus Avenue	
7	Yonkers; Getty Square; Nepperhan Plaza at Yonkers station	↔	New Rochelle Transportation Center	Yonkers Avenue, Lincoln Avenue	Some bus stops in Getty Square were relocated to accommodate the new routing.; Some trips terminate at Mount Vernon.; One Saturday eastbound trip terminates along Lincoln Avenue at Fifth Avenue in Pelham.
8	Tuckahoe station Depot Square	↔	Riverdale, Bronx; University of Mt. St. Vincent; Riverdale Avenue at New York City-Yonkers line	Riverdale Avenue, Elm Street, Walnut Street, Saw Mill River Road, Tuckahoe Road	Additional service provided during school days only. These trips operate between Valentine Lane and Roosevelt High School.
9	Yonkers; Nepperhan Plaza at Yonkers station	↻	South Westchester Executive Park	Clockwise loop: Palisade Avenue, North Broadway (northbound); Nepperhan Avenue (southbound)	Weekday service only.
12	White Plains TransCenter; Lane B	↔	Armonk; North Castle Town Hall	Westchester Avenue, Purchase Street, Anderson Hill Road (some trips), King Street	Weekend service operates only between White Plains and the Westchester County Airport.; Some rush hour trips also serve Reckson Executive Park and Westchester Business Park in Armonk.
13	Ossining; Ossining station	↔	Port Chester station (All times)	Midland Avenue, Westchester Avenue, Tarrytown Road, White Plains Road, Broadway, Albany Post Road	Weekend service ends at Spring Street in Ossining, and does not serve the train station.; Select trips are extended to operate to Playland year round, with additional service during the summer. Otherwise, most service terminates at the Port Chester station on Westchester Avenue.; Some trips operate only between Port Chester and Tarrytown station.
13	Ossining; Ossining station	↔	Rye; Playland (Summer only, some trips)	Midland Avenue, Westchester Avenue, Tarrytown Road, White Plains Road, Broadway, Albany Post Road	Weekend service ends at Spring Street in Ossining, and does not serve the train station.; Select trips are extended to operate to Playland year round, with additional service during the summer. Otherwise, most service terminates at the Port Chester station on Westchester Avenue.; Some trips operate only between Port Chester and Tarrytown station.
14	White Plains; City Center	↔	Cortlandt; Town Center	Tarrytown Road, Saw Mill River Road, Croton Avenue, Albany Post Road, Riverside Avenue, Westchester Avenue, Washington Street, Main Street	First northbound weekday trip starts at Elmsford Square, and operates as a semi-express, bypassing the Westchester Medical Center, Briarcliff Manor, and Verplanck.; First two southbound weekday trips start at Grasslands Road and Clearbrook Road, the second trip operating express between Elmsford Square and White Plains.; Saturday service departing White Plains after 6:20 PM terminates in Ossining.
15	White Plains; City Center	↔	Peekskill; Main Street and Nelson Avenue	Knollwood Road, Saw Mill River Road, Crompond Road, East Main Street	All trips operate the full route between White Plains and Peeksill, via Westchester Community College, Westchester Medical Center, Hawthorne, Pleasantville, Millwood, Yorktown Heights, and Cortlandt Town Center.; No Sunday service.
16	Mahopac; Village Centre	↔	Cortlandt Manor; Hudson Valley Hospital Center (except rush hours)	Route 6, Oregon Road, Division Street	Rush hour trips do not serve the Hudson Valley Hospital Center (except AM eastbound).; Some trips operate via Strawberry Road.; Some trips terminate at either Jefferson Valley Mall or Somers Commons.; Sunday service only operates between the Hudson Valley Hospital Center and Somers Commons in Baldwin Place.
16	Mahopac; Village Centre	↔	Peekskill station Railroad Avenue	Route 6, Oregon Road, Division Street	Rush hour trips do not serve the Hudson Valley Hospital Center (except AM eastbound).; Some trips operate via Strawberry Road.; Some trips terminate at either Jefferson Valley Mall or Somers Commons.; Sunday service only operates between the Hudson Valley Hospital Center and Somers Commons in Baldwin Place.
19	Ossining; Ossining station	↔	Katonah station Katonah Avenue and Jay Street	Croton Avenue, Pleasantville Road, Bedford Road	No Sunday service.; Saturday service ends in downtown Ossining, and does not serve the train station.
20	Bedford Park, Bronx; Bedford Park Boulevard and Jerome Avenue at Bedford Park Boulevard–Lehman College ( train)	↔	Cross County Shopping Center (alternate trips)	Jerome Avenue, Central Park Avenue	Trips alternate between White Plains and Cross County Shopping Center.; Trips signed as 20X make all stops except the Cross County Shopping Center Mall.; Additional evening service operates between Bedford Park and either Central Park Avenue at Yonkers Avenue or Central Park Avenue at Fort Hill Road.
20	Bedford Park, Bronx; Bedford Park Boulevard and Jerome Avenue at Bedford Park Boulevard–Lehman College ( train)	↔	White Plains; City Center	Jerome Avenue, Central Park Avenue	Trips alternate between White Plains and Cross County Shopping Center.; Trips signed as 20X make all stops except the Cross County Shopping Center Mall.; Additional evening service operates between Bedford Park and either Central Park Avenue at Yonkers Avenue or Central Park Avenue at Fort Hill Road.
25	Yonkers; Nepperhan Plaza	↔	Wakefield, Bronx; Nereid Avenue and White Plains Road at Nereid Avenue ( trains)	Ashburton Avenue, Midland Avenue, Kimball Avenue, Neried Avenue	All trips operate via Cross County Shopping Center.
26	Bronxville station Palmer Avenue	↔	Wakefield, Bronx; Nereid Avenue and White Plains Road at Nereid Avenue ( trains)	Kimball Avenue, Bronx River Road, Neried Avenue	No Sunday service.
30	Yonkers; Getty Square; Riverdale Avenue	↔	New Rochelle Transportation Center	Lockwood Avenue, Palmer Road, Pondfield Road, Webster Avenue	No Sunday service.; During school days, some morning trips terminate at Saunders High School.; Some trips end at Bronxville railroad Station.
32	Yonkers; Nepperhan Plaza at Yonkers station	↻	Nodine Hill	Clockwise loop: Rumsey Road (southbound); Hawthorne Avenue (northbound)	Weekday service only.; The first three trips of the day operate via Van Cortlandt Park Avenue.
40	Westchester Medical Center	↔	Mount Vernon; Petrillo Plaza	Hillside Avenue, White Plains Post Road, North Columbus Avenue	Some weekday trips are extended to Wakefield–241st Street ( train).; Some late evening trips operate via Saw Mill River Road (Route 9A) in Elmsford instead of Hillside Avenue (Route 100).
42	New Rochelle Transportation Center	↔	Wakefield, Bronx; 233rd Street and White Plains Road at 233rd Street ( trains)	West 1st Street, White Plains Road, Pelhamdale Avenue, Boston Post Road	Weekday evening service and all weekend service terminates at 241st Street instead of 233rd Street.; The last PM trip to the Bronx operates via Sound Shore Medical Center in New Rochelle.
45	Pelham Bay Park, Bronx; Bruckner Boulevard at Pelham Bay Park ( trains)	↔	Eastchester; Mill Road and White Plains Road	Pelham Road, Shore Road, North Avenue	Most trips loop through downtown New Rochelle.; Open-door in the Bronx.
45Q	New Rochelle; Main Street and Church Avenue	↔ AM ---- ↔ PM	New Rochelle; Pine Brook Boulevard and Stratton Road	North Avenue, Pine Brook Boulevard	Weekday rush-hour service only.
52	Bronxville Railroad Station; Palmer Avenue	↔	Baychester, Bronx; Bivona Street and Reeds Mill Lane; Secor Housing	Gramatan Avenue, South Fifth Avenue	No Sunday service.
53	Mount Vernon East Railroad Station; North side	↔	Mount Vernon High School	East 3rd Street, Fifth Avenue (Pelham)	Weekday rush-hour service only.; Select trips terminate at Mount Vernon High School during the school year.
54	Mount Vernon East Railroad Station; North side	↔	Mount Vernon; Sandford Boulevard and Fulton Avenue	South 11th Avenue, Sandford Boulevard	Weekday rush-hour service only.; Open door along Mundy Lane in the Bronx.; The first AM trip from Sandford Boulevard continues to Mount Vernon High School.
55	Cross County Shopping Center; Macy's	↔	Eastchester, Bronx; Dyre Avenue and Light Street at Eastchester–Dyre Avenue ( train)	Terrace Avenue, South Columbus Avenue	
60	Fordham, Bronx; Fordham Road and Third Avenue	↔	White Plains Transcenter; Lane B	Fordham Road, Boston Road, Palmer Avenue, Mamaroneck Avenue	Open-door in the Bronx along Boston Road. Local passengers are not carried along Fordham Road.; Some weekday trips do not serve Bryant Avenue or Old Mamaroneck Road in White Plains.; Most Sunday trips operate between Fordham and either Mamaroneck station or White Plains.; Sunday trips departing Fordham after 5:00 PM terminate in New Rochelle.
61	Fordham, Bronx; Fordham Road and Third Avenue	↔	Port Chester; Willett Avenue and Putnam Avenue	Fordham Road, Boston Road, Fifth Avenue, Halstead Avenue	No Sunday service.; Open-door in the Bronx along Boston Road. Local passengers are not carried along Fordham Road.
63	White Plains Transcenter; Lane B	↔	Scarsdale station East side	Old Mamaroneck Road, Palmer Avenue, Crossway, Popham Road	Weekdays only, some trips operate via Crossways, signed as 63C.; Weekdays only, one trip in each direction serves Brook Street and Garth Road instead of Popham Road in Scarsdale, signed as 63G.; Some weekday trips operate between Scarsdale and Palmer Avenue at Mamaroneck Road.; No Sunday service.
66	Mercy University	↔	New Rochelle Transportation Center	Ashford Avenue, Ardsley Road, Weaver Street, Palmer Avenue	Weekday service only.; Some rush hour service originates/terminates at Dobbs Ferry station instead of Mercy University.; Rush hour trips operating between Dobbs Ferry railroad station and Ardsley Square serve Beacon Hill Drive and Ogden Avenue.
78	Yonkers; Getty Square; Broadway	↔	Yonkers; Roosevelt High School; Central Park Avenue at Tuckahoe Road	Palisade Avenue, Ashburton Avenue, Nepperhan Avenue, Tuckahoe Road	Operates to Roosevelt High School via Stew Leonard Drive and Ridge Hill Shopping Center.

=== Limited-Stop and Express ===
Route	Terminals			Major Streets	Notes
1X	Riverdale, Bronx; 242nd Street and Broadway at Van Cortlandt Park–242nd Street ( train)	→ AM ← PM	SUNY Westchester Community College and Westchester Medical Center	South Broadway, Sprain Brook Parkway	Express service; Passengers carried to and from Westchester Community College and Westchester Medical Center only.; No stops between Getty Square, Yonkers and Westchester Community College
3	Riverdale, Bronx; 242nd Street and Broadway at Van Cortlandt Park–242nd Street ( train)	→ AM ← PM	Purchase; The Centre at Purchase at MasterCard headquarters	South Broadway, Sprain Brook Parkway; Westchester Avenue	Closed door service south of White Plains.; Express between White Plains and Yonkers.; Some early morning trips end at White Plains.
11	Croton–Harmon station	→ AM ← PM	White Plains; Main Street and North Broadway	Saw Mill River Road; Highland Avenue	Express between Elmsford Square and Westchester County Center.
17	Cortlandt Town Center	→ AM ← PM	White Plains; Main Street and North Broadway	Route 9A	The first PM departure continues as the last southbound 15 to White Plains.; Some trips end at Nelson Avenue & Main Street adjacent to the Peekskill Library
21	Bedford Park, Bronx; Bedford Park Boulevard and Jerome Avenue at Bedford Park Boulevard–Lehman College ( train)	↔	White Plains; Main Street and North Broadway	Jerome Avenue, Central Park Avenue	Limited-stop service.; Operates in both directions during AM rush hours, and in the Bedford Park-bound direction only during PM rush hours.; These trips do not serve the Cross County Shopping Center.
27	Hawthorne; Mid-Westchester Executive Park	← AM → PM	White Plains; Main Street and North Broadway	Saw Mill River Road	Limited-stop service from Sams Club to Westchester County center.; Passengers carried to and from White Plains only.; Second AM trip continues non-stop to Peekskill.
41	Wakefield, Bronx; 241st Street and White Plains Road at Wakefield–241 Street ( train)	→ AM ← PM	Westchester Medical Center	Hillside Avenue, White Plains Road	Limited-stop service from Valhalla to White Plains.; Some trips start/end in Mount Vernon and White Plains TransCenter; Express from White Plains to Mount Vernon with one stop at Eastchester Square.
43	Wakefield, Bronx; 241st Street and White Plains Road at Wakefield–241 Street ( train)	→ AM ← PM	Westchester Medical Center	Sprain Brook Parkway; White Plains Road, Bradhurst Avenue	Express from Grasslands Road to Mount Vernon.; On northbound trips, pickups are made in the Bronx and Mount Vernon for travel to Grasslands Road and points north only.; Southbound trips are open-door from downtown Mount Vernon to The Bronx.
62	Fordham, Bronx; Tiebout Avenue and Fordham Road near Fordham Road ( trains)	→ AM ← PM	White Plains Transcenter	Fordham Road Boston Road; New England Thruway; Westchester Avenue	Express from Platinum Mile to New Rochelle.; Open-door in the Bronx along Boston Road. Local passengers are not carried along Fordham Road.
77	Carmel; Carmel Bowl Park and Ride at Putnam Plaza	→ AM ← PM	White Plains; Main Street and North Broadway	Taconic State Parkway; Routes 132 and 6	Express from Westchester County Center to FDR State Park Park-Ride.

=== Westchester-Manhattan Express ===
Route	Terminals			Major streets traveled	Notes
BxM4C	White Plains; Central Avenue and Harding Avenue	→ AM ← PM	Manhattan; Madison Square and 23rd Street	Central Park Avenue, Major Deegan Expressway, 5th Avenue (southbound), Madison Avenue (northbound)	Weekday service only. Internally referred and staffed to as route 28.; This route charges the premium express bus fare of $7.75.; Customers carried to and from Manhattan only.

=== Commuter ===
Route	Terminals (Station served/municipality of origin)			Major streets traveled	Notes
10	Croton-on-Hudson; Croton–Harmon (Metro-North station)	→ AM ← PM	Cortlandt Town Center	Crompond Road, Old Yorktown Road	Local stops within Croton-on-Hudson, then express to and from Yorktown.
18	Peekskill; Peekskill (Metro-North station)	↔	Cortlandt; Crompond Road and Conklin Street	Crompond Road, Main Street	AM service via Main Street first.; PM service via Crompond Road first.; Replaces Route 16 service to Hudson Valley Hospital during peak hours.
31	Peekskill; Peekskill (Metro-North station)	→ AM ← PM	Buchanan; Indian Point	Lower South Street	
34	Hartsdale; Hartsdale (Metro-North station)	↔	Greenburgh; Old Knollwood Road and Hartsdale Avenue	Hartsdale Avenue	
38	Hartsdale; Hartsdale (Metro-North station)	↔	Greenburgh; Secor Road and Westway	Hartsdale Avenue, Secor Road	
39	Hartsdale; Hartsdale (Metro-North station)	↔	Ardsley; Ardsley Square	Hartsdale Avenue, Heatherdell Road	
64	Scarsdale; Scarsdale (Metro-North station)	↔	Eastchester; Stratford Road	Garth Road	
65	Scarsdale; Scarsdale (Metro-North station)	↔	Greenburgh; Highland Road and Longview Drive	Ardsley Road	
70	Larchmont; Larchmont (Metro-North station)	↺	Larchmont loop	Palmer Avenue, Fenimore Road, Rockland Avenue, Rockingstone Avenue	Operates in a counterclockwise loop
71	Larchmont; Larchmont (Metro-North station)	↔	Larchmont; Grove Avenue and Magnolia Avenue	Larchmont Avenue, Beech Avenue	AM service services Beech Avenue first.; PM service services Larchmont Avenue first.

=== Shuttle Loops ===
Route	Terminal	Major streets traveled	Notes
Loop A	Platinum Mile; 777 Westchester Avenue	Westchester Avenue	Serves 333 Westchester Avenue, White Plains Office Park, and Westchester Medical Group.
Loop B	Platinum Mile; Westchester Corporate Park	Westchester Avenue	Serves Corporate Park Drive and Gannett.
Loop C	Rye Ridge Shopping Plaza	Cross-Westchester Expressway	Serves office complexes in Harrison and Rye Brook east of Purchase Street.
Loop D	Platinum Mile, Nine West	Westchester Avenue	Also serves Combe, IBM, and Red Oak Lane.
Loop F	Tarrytown, Taxter Road	Cross Westchester Expressway	Serves Fuji, KLM, the Marriott Hotel, and the Tarrytown Corporate Center.
Loop H	Armonk. IBM	Lake Street, King Street	Also serves Swiss Re and MBIA. WITCO is served by a highway stop on Route 22, or via the 12.

=== Seasonal ===
These routes provide seasonal service to and from Playland (New York) during summers only. There is no service on Mondays, excluding certain holidays.

Route	Terminal	Major streets traveled	Notes
75	Rye; Rye (Metro-North station)	Playland Parkway, New England Thruway	No intermediate stops.
91	Yonkers	Yonkers Avenue, South Fulton Avenue, Sandford Boulevard, Pelhamdale Avenue, Boston Post Road, New England Thruway	This route operates as a pickup-only route towards Playland, and a drop-off only route towards Yonkers.; Nonstop from New Rochelle to Playland.

School Routes

These routes provide service to and from certain county schools and act similar to normal school bus services although require the typical Bee Line fare of $3.00

Route	Terminal	Major streets traveled	Notes
401	Mount Vernon W Standford Blvd at S 11th Ave	S 5th Ave, W Standford Blvd	
402	Mount Vernon Gramatan Ave at E Prospect Ave	E Lincoln Ave, Gramatan Ave	
403 & 405	Mount Vernon W Kingsbridge Road at S 5th Ave	E Lincoln Ave, Gramatan Ave, S 5th Ave	
404	Mount Vernon Fleetwood Ave at Broad St	Fleetwood Ave, E Lincoln Ave	
430	Yonkers Getty Square	Ashburton Ave	
440	Yonkers S Broadway at Vark St	S Broadway	
441	Yonkers S Broadway at Caryl Ave	S Broadway	
448	Yonkers Valentine Lane at Riverdale Ave	Riverdale Ave, S Broadway	
460	New Rochelle North Ave at Main St	North Ave, Quaker Ridge Road	
461	New Rochelle Lockwood Ave at Guion Place	North Ave, Quaker Ridge Road, Lockwood Ave	
462	New Rochelle 5th Ave at Koch Ave	North Ave, Quaker Ridge Road, 5th Ave	
463	New Rochelle Issac Young Middle School	Beechmont Drive, Forest Ave	
465	New Rochelle Grand Blvd at Stratton Rd	Pinebrook Blvd, Wilmot Road	
466	New Rochelle North Ave at Wilmot Rd	Pinbrook Blvd, Stratton Road	
467	New Rochelle Stratton Road at Wilmot Rd	Pinebrook Blvd, Wilmot Road, Grand Blvd, Stratton Rd	
468	New Rochelle E Main Street and Monroe Street	Pinebrook Blvd, Beechmont Drive, 5th Ave, Palmer Ave, Stephenson Blvd	
470	Yonkers Getty Square	Midland Ave	
472	Yonkers Tudor Woods	Saw Mill River Road, Ashburton Ave	

- All routes 400-405 end in the morning and begin in the afternoon at Mount Vernon High School
- Route 430, 440, 441, 448, 470, and 472 end in the morning and begin in the afternoon at either Saunders High School or Lincoln High School
- All routes 460-468 end in the morning and begin in the afternoon at Albert Leonard Middle School

== History of current routes ==
Route	History
1T	Originally ran to Pleasantville via Route 119.
1X	The original 1X used to operate as the last southbound 1C to Elmsford, where it then became a 1W and made express stops. This was discontinued in the late 1980s as the 1X, however this trip does still operate today and is listed as a "1C/1W" trip on the timetable.; Second variation of the 1X began in September 2008.
2	Extended to South Westchester Executive Park via Tudor Woods during rush hours in 2009.; Fall 2015 schedule added one AM northbound and two PM southbound runs to Executive Park on Saturday and Sunday.
3	Original Northern terminal was White Plains prior to the 1980s.; Northbound service originally operated via North Broadway and Ashburton Avenue until 2002, where it was rerouted to operate up Palisades Avenue with the introduction of the Neoplan AN460 articulated buses due to the steep hill embankment from Broadway onto Ashburton Avenue.
4	Prior to the early 1990s, southbound 4 buses originally operated via Bainbridge Avenue to 206th Street, where they then made a right to its last stop at Bedford Park Boulevard, serving the IND subway first and then the IRT subway.; This route was originally numbered the 22 prior to the 1970s.
5	Original northbound terminus was Port Chester prior to the 1980s.; Service was originally extended to Playland via Harrison during summer months but was discontinued sometime after 1992.; A few northbound trips originally ended at Barney Street where the old bus garage was located. This service pattern was discontinued when the garage was relocated and the nearby factory was closed down. There were plans to reinstate this service pattern in 2006 following a push to reopen the factory, but never materialized.; Between 2002 and 2008, some southbound trips operated via Walsh Road in Yonkers. This service pattern was discontinued when the #9 route was reconfigured into a loop.; Originally ran to Port Chester sometime prior to the early 1990s before its eastern terminal was swapped with the 13 east of White Plains to improve reliability.; Between 1990 and 1996, one select round-trip continued up Nepperhan Avenue to Nepera Park, the terminal of the former streetcar line.
6	The original northbound terminal for this line was White Plains in the 1980s. It was extended to Pleasantville following the routing of the original #18 route when it discontinued around 1985, and later extended into Pace University via Thornwood.; On June 21, 2004, service via Thornwood was discontinued and replaced by a rerouted 15. In June 2005, service into Pace University was discontinued and cut back to end at Pleasantville Railroad Station at Bedford Road and Wheeler Avenue.; This route had a variant, the 6U, which operated via Uniontown in Hastings-On-Hudson during rush hours. It was discontinued on March 7, 2016, due to low ridership.; In September 2018, #6 service was rerouted via Downtown Dobbs Ferry (via the #1 routing), and discontinued on Broadway between Livingston Avenue and Ashford Avenue. This change was done due to complaints from riders that there was not enough service in Dobbs Ferry.
7	As with many other routes, service originally ran to the Yonkers RR Station, but was cut back to Main Street and Mill Street due to the reconstruction of the Yonkers RR Station area in 2004.; Service extended to Yonkers RR Station on September 5, 2017.; Some trips originally had short turns to Pelham
8	Sunday service added in Fall 2015.
9	Original service only have four trips in the day, with two trips to Yonkers RR Station in the AM and two trips from Yonkers RR Station in the PM.; Original service had two select trips via Fairview Street and Ridge Avenue.; Service originally operated between Yonkers RR Station and Bolmer Avenue via Robert's Avenue until 2008, where it was then turned into a loop route.
12	Between 1970 and 1994, service operated via Underhill Road and Lake Street in Silver Lake and Route 120. This service pattern was altered when the #12 was rerouted via Westchester Avenue and Anderson Hill Road to replace parts of the former #75 and #77 services on Anderson Hill Road.; Between 1980 and 1994, service originally ran to the Mahopac Village Center at Baldwin Place. This service pattern ended when Jefferson Valley Mall opened, and the #12 was rerouted to serve the mall. No bus service to Mahopac Village Center was provided for a while until the #16 was extended there in the late 1990s.; A portion of the route between Armonk and Jefferson Valley Mall via Yorktown and Mount Kisco (original northern terminus) was discontinued on February 15, 2010, due to low ridership.; Anderson Hill Road bypass service was added in March 2006, skipping Westchester Avenue, Kenilworth Word and Purchase Street, but still serving Manhattanville College.; Anderson Hill Road bypass service was incorporated into weekend routing in 2013.; Sunday service originally ended at SUNY Purchase until service was cut back to Armonk full-time in 2013.; Had an express variant called the 12X.
13	Original northbound terminus was Harrison until the mid-1980s.; The full-time eastbound terminal was originally Port Chester before being extended to Rye, Playland to absorb the former Route 76 service in 2011.; Originally had a variant that operated via Benedict Avenue in Tarrytown, the 13B, before being discontinued in 2018 due to low-ridership.; Originally went to Harrison until the early 1980s, when the eastern terminals were swapped with the 5 route.; Some bus stops were relocated or removed as part of a bus stop-balancing effort.
14	Until 1995, service originally operated via Bradhurst Avenue between Westchester Medical Center and Route 9A. This service pattern was discontinued due to height restrictions along Bradhurst Avenue.; Northbound service originally ended at Beach Shopping Center in Peekskill, before being extended to the new Cortlandt Town Center in Mohegan Lake in 2000.
14X	The first 14X variation was implemented in the 1980s, only skipping Knollwood Road.; The second 14X variation was implemented sometime in the late 1990s, skipping Knollwood Road and the Westchester Medical Center. This service pattern was discontinued in 2000.; The third and current 14X variation, although does not display 14X, was implemented in 2005, beginning in Elmsford Square, skipping Westchester Medical Center and Verplank and ending at Cortlandt Town Center.
15	Service was rerouted via Thornwood on June 21, 2004, when #6 service in Thornwood was discontinued.; Had an express variant called 15X.
16	Service was extended east to the Mahopac Village Center at Baldwin Place in March 2006.
17	The original southern terminal of this line was Bryant Avenue and North Street prior to 2005.
18 (second use)	On June 23, 2008, the southern section of the #18 to Indian Point was split into the #31 to improve reliability.
19	A variant of the #19 route, the #19G, split off from regular #19 in Hawthorne and followed the #14 route into the Westchester Medical Center. The "G" stands for Grasslands, and was discontinued sometime in the late 1990s.
21	Used to be an express service, before stops started being added in 1998 until 2001, when it was then modified to become a limited-stop route.
25	Westbound terminal was formerly Yonkers Railroad Station until 2018, where it was truncated to Manor House Square.; Although being cut back from Yonkers Railroad Station, starting trips to the Bronx continue to originate there.
31 (second use)	Began service on June 23, 2008, running from Peekskill to Indian Point. This route is operated under P.T.L.A and is interlined with the #18 line.
43	Began service on September 24, 2007, as an alternative to the #41 route, running via the Cross County and Sprain Brook Parkway.; On September 7, 2018, service was rerouted to serve Bradhurst Avenue in both directions.; On September 7, 2026, a new 6:35 AM northbound trip was added departing from E 241 St.
60	Original terminus was Valentine Avenue and East Fordham Road.
61	Original terminus was Valentine Avenue and East Fordham Road.; During the summer, service used to operate to Playland. This service pattern was discontinued sometime prior to 1996.
63	Originally, buses operating along Crossways were labeled as the 63C, while buses operating along Garth Road were labeled as the 63G on bus signage.
75	Monday service added on June 21, 2021.; The original northern terminus was Port Chester until sometime before 2010.
78	Originally, buses used to operate as a loop from Getty Square to Stew Leonard Drive and back (via I-87); Rerouted to serve Ridge Hill Shopping Center in October 2011 and became a Limited-Stop Route; Extended to Central Park Avenue sometime in 2014 and converted into a bi-directional local route.
91	Originally ran to Yonkers RR Station before being cut back to Main Street and Warburton Avenue sometime prior to 2003 due to construction in Downtown Yonkers.; This is the last remaining Playland route in the 90 series. The 90, 92, and 93 were all discontinued.; Tuesday service discontinued on June 21, 2021, but was reinstated in June 2022.
BxM4C	Began service on September 7, 1982; original northern terminus at Cross Street.; Wall Street service began on September 13, 1982.; Extended north to Tarrytown Road at Westchester County Center in March 1983 during the Metro-North Railroad strike.; Lower Manhattan (southern terminal) service via Fifth Avenue to Wall Street discontinued on February 15, 2010.; Originally had weekend service before being discontinued in 2010.

== Proposed new bus routes ==
In December 2020, a re-design was announced for the county bus system. The draft plan was released on July 19, 2022, with system-wide changes which are outlined below. These changes also bring in 100 series routes, which partially replace former portions of modified lines. If a bus route is not shown here, it was discontinued with the new plan, with the exception of the 75 and 91 routes, which were not part of the redesign due to being seasonal-only routes. Several discontinued bus routes are being replaced with on-demand "microtransit" lines.

=== Local ===
Route	Terminals			Major streets traveled	Notes
1	Riverdale, Bronx; 242nd Street and Broadway at Van Cortlandt Park–242nd Street ( train)	↔	Yonkers JFK Marina	Broadway, Warburton Avenue	1C and 1W services eliminated.; 1T service split into new 109 route.; Service cut back to JFK Marina park.
2	Riverdale, Bronx; 242nd Street and Broadway at Van Cortlandt Park–242nd Street ( train)	↔	Yonkers; DeHaven Drive and Gateway Road at Tudor Woods apartment complex	Broadway, Park Avenue	Service to Executive Park eliminated, replaced by 9.
4	Bedford Park, Bronx; Bedford Park Boulevard and Jerome Avenue at Bedford Park Boulevard–Lehman College ( train)	↔	Yonkers; Getty Square; Nepperhan Plaza at Yonkers Metro-North Station	Jerome Avenue, McLean Avenue, Broadway	Northern Terminal is now at Yonkers Railroad Station.
5	Yonkers; Getty Square; Riverdale Avenue	↔	Valhalla; Westchester Community College and Westchester Medical Center	Nepperhan Avenue, Saw Mill River Road	Service is now streamlined to replace the former 1C.; No longer serves White Plains or Harrison.; Continues on Saw Mill River Road past Tarrytown Road then follows the former 1C to Westchester Medical Center and Westchester Community College.; Former Lake Street branch split into new 108.
6	Yonkers; Nepperhan Plaza at Yonkers Metro-North Station	↔	White Plains; City Center	Broadway, Dobbs Ferry Road, Columbus Avenue	Service north of White Plains now replaced by a rerouted 19.
7	Yonkers; Getty Square; Nepperhan Plaza at Yonkers Metro-North Station	↔	New Rochelle Transportation Center	Yonkers Avenue, Lincoln Avenue	No change, except for slight routing modifications in New Rochelle.
8	Tuckahoe station Depot Square	↔	Riverdale, Bronx; University of Mt. St. Vincent; Riverdale Avenue at New York City-Yonkers line	Riverdale Avenue, Tuckahoe Road	No change.
9	Yonkers; Nepperhan Plaza at Yonkers Metro-North Station	↔	Odell Avenue	Palisade Avenue, North Broadway	Service would no longer operate south of Odell Avenue.; Service would revert to being bi-directional, no longer operating in a loop.
13	Tarrytown; Tarrytown station	↔	Port Chester station	Midland Avenue, Westchester Avenue, Tarrytown Road, White Plains Road Broadway, Albany Post Road	Service north of Tarrytown split into new Route 111.; It is unclear if this route would continue operating into Rye, Playland, as the draft plan is missing or does not acknowledge the presence of routes 13, 75 and 91 which operate into Rye.
14	White Plains; City Center	↔	Peekskill; Main Street and Nelson Avenue	Tarrytown Road, Saw Mill River Road, Croton Avenue, Albany Post Road, Riverside Avenue, Westchester Avenue, Washington Street, Main Street	Service has been heavily modified.; Will no longer operate north of Peekskill.; Kings Ferry Road service eliminated, service continues through Buchanan.; Service now operates via Bedford Road and Pleasantville Road to Pleasantville Station, serving parts of the former 19.
15	Peekskill; Main Street and Nelson Avenue	↔	Katonah Avenue and Jay Street	Katonah Avenue and Jay Street	Service south of Yorktown Heights eliminated.; Service would be extended to Peekskill Train Station.
19	White Plains; City Center	↔	Katonah station Katonah Avenue and Jay Street	Croton Avenue, Pleasantville Road, Bedford Road	Service would no longer operate to Ossining. Instead, it will follow the routing of the former 6 between Pleasantville and White Plains, creating a new north–south link between Katonah and White Plains.
20	Williamsbridge, Bronx; White Plains Road and East Gun Hill Road at Gun Hill Road ( trains)	↔	Cross County Shopping Center (alternate trips)	Jerome Avenue, Central Park Avenue	Service will now operate along Gun Hill Road to Williamsbridge instead of Bedford Park.; Bedford Park service will still be available on the 4 and 21.
20	Williamsbridge, Bronx; White Plains Road and East Gun Hill Road at Gun Hill Road ( trains)	↔	White Plains; City Center	Jerome Avenue, Central Park Avenue	Service will now operate along Gun Hill Road to Williamsbridge instead of Bedford Park.; Bedford Park service will still be available on the 4 and 21.
25	Yonkers; Nepperhan Plaza	↔	Eastchester, Bronx; Dyre Avenue and Light Street at Eastchester–Dyre Avenue ( train)	Midland Avenue; Kimball Avenue; South Columbus Avenue	Service south of Cross County is now combined with the 55, forming a new east–west connection.; Former service south of Cross County is merged with the 26 forming the new 106 route.
30	Yonkers; Getty Square; Nepperhan Plaza at Yonkers Metro-North Station	↔	New Rochelle Transportation Center	Palmer Road; Pondfield Road; Webster Avenue	Service will be extended west to end at Yonkers station, following the same routing as the 7.; Service will be rerouted to operate along Pelhamdale Avenue and Lincoln Avenue to reach Webster Avenue, instead of operating on Eastchester Road and Webster Avenue north of Lincoln Avenue.; There will be routing modifications around Mile Square Road.
40	White Plains; TransCenter	↔	Mount Vernon; Petrillo Plaza	Hillside Avenue; White Plains Road	Service north of White Plains split into new routes 103 and 104, respectively.; Service would no longer operate south of Mount Vernon to 241st Street subway station.; Service would no longer operate north of White Plains.
42	New Rochelle Transportation Center	↔	Wakefield, Bronx; 241st Street and White Plains Road at Wakefield–241st Street ( trains)	West 1 Street, White Plains Road; Pelhamdale Avenue Boston Post Road	Service would no longer operate south of 241st Street Subway Station.; Service would now operate via Colonial Avenue instead of Pelhamdale Avenue in New Rochelle.
45	Pelham Bay Park, Bronx; Bruckner Boulevard at Pelham Bay Park ( trains)	↔	Tuckahoe station Depot Square	Pelham Road, Shore Road; North Avenue	45Q service would be discontinued due to very low ridership.; Service would be extended west to Tuckahoe to fill in the gap in service.
52	Bronxville station Palmer Avenue	↔	Baychester, Bronx; Bivona Street and Reeds Mill Lane; Secor Housing	Gramatan Avenue; South Fifth Avenue	No change.
53	Mount Vernon East station North side	↔	Pelham at 5th Avenue	East 3 Street; Fifth Avenue (Pelham)	Service would be modified into two branches, with one serving upper Mount Vernon, and the other lower Pelham.
53	Mount Vernon East station North side	↔	Mount Vernon at Eastchester Road	East 3 Street; Fifth Avenue (Pelham)	Service would be modified into two branches, with one serving upper Mount Vernon, and the other lower Pelham.
60	Fordham; Fordham Road and Third Avenue	↔	White Plains Transcenter; Lane B	Fordham Road Boston Road; Palmer Avenue; Mamaroneck Avenue	Service would remain on Boston Post Road instead of Palmer Avenue, no longer serving the Larchmont RR Station.; Service would remain on Mamaroneck Road rather than turning to serve Bryant Road and Old Mamaroneck Road.
61	Fordham; Fordham Road and Third Avenue	↔	Port Chester; Willett Avenue and Putnam Avenue	Fordham Road Boston Road; Fifth Avenue; Halstead Avenue	Service would approach Port Chester via Cedar Street and Boston Post Road, instead of deviating to serve Purchase, Ridge, and High Streets.
66	Mercy University	↔	White Plains Transcenter; Lane B	Ashford Avenue; Ardsley Road; Weaver Street; Old Mamaroneck Road; Popham Road	Service would combined with the former 63, forming a new west–east connection from Dobbs Ferry to White Plains via the existing alignment of the 63.; Service would no longer operate via Garth Road or Crossways.; Former portion between Scarsdale and New Rochelle split into the new 110.
78	Yonkers; Getty Square; Broadway	↔	Tuckahoe station Depot Square	Tuckahoe Road	Service is extended east to the Tuckahoe Train Station, following the existing 8 routing.
101	Yonkers; Nepperhan Plaza	↔	New Rochelle Transportation Center	McLean Avenue; Sandford Boulevard; Colonial Avenue	New route, reviving parts of the former 24 service, which was discontinued in 1994.; Operates via the 241st Street Subway Station.
103	Tarrytown; Tarrytown station	↔	White Plains Transcenter; EJ Conroy Drive	White Plains Road; Saw Mill River Road; Westchester Medical Center; Westchester Community College; Hillside Avenue; Tarrytown Road	New route, operating via White Plains Road, Saw Mill River Road, Westchester Medical Center, Westchester Community College, Hillside Avenue, and Tarrytown Road.; Branded as the "Grasslands Shuttle".
104	Tarrytown; Tarrytown station	↔	White Plains Transcenter; EJ Conroy Drive	Neperan Road; Broadway	New route, operating via Neperan Road, Westchester Medical Center, Westchester Community College, Valhalla, and Broadway.; Formerly parts of loop E.
105	Williamsbridge, Bronx; White Plains Road and East Gun Hill Road at Gun Hill Road ( trains)	↔	Yonkers; Stew Leonard Drive at Costco	Jerome Avenue, Central Park Avenue, I-87, Ridge Hill Boulevard, Stew Leonard Drive	New route, creating a new one seat ride from the Bronx to Stew Leonard Drive via Ridge Hill.; Operates via Cross County and Ridge Hill.; Will be an extension of the short-term 20 trip from Cross County to Ridge Hill
106	Wakefield, Bronx; Nereid Avenue and White Plains Road at Nereid Avenue ( trains)	↔	Bronxville station Palmer Avenue	Kimball Avenue	New route, merging the southern parts of the former 25 to Cross County, and the northern parts of the former 26 to Bronxville.; Operates via Cross County
107	Wakefield, Bronx; 233rd Street and White Plains Road at 233rd Street ( trains)	↔	Mount Vernon; Petrillo Plaza	Pitman Avenue; Sandford Boulevard; South Fulton Avenue	Weekdays and Saturdays only; New route, following the former Route 54 along West Sanford Boulevard

=== Limited-Stop and Express ===
Route	Terminals			Major streets traveled	Notes
3	Riverdale, Bronx; 242nd Street and Broadway at Van Cortlandt Park–242nd Street ( train)	→ AM ← PM	White Plains Transcenter; EJ Conroy Drive at Main Street	Broadway; Sprain Brook Parkway	Service would no longer operate between White Plains and Manhattanville.; In Yonkers, service would instead operate on Yonkers Avenue to Central Avenue, then via the Sprain Brook Parkway.
21	Bedford Park, Bronx; Bedford Park Boulevard and Jerome Avenue at Bedford Park Boulevard–Lehman College ( train)	↔	White Plains; Main Street and North Broadway	Jerome Avenue, Central Park Avenue	No change.
41	Wakefield, Bronx; 241st Street and White Plains Road at Wakefield–241st Street ( train)	↔	White Plains; TransCenter	Hillside Avenue, White Plains Road	No service from Valhalla to White Plains.; Express from White Plains to Mount Vernon with one stop at Eastchester Square.
43	Wakefield, Bronx; 241st Street and White Plains Road at Wakefield–241st Street ( train)	↔	Westchester Community College	Sprain Brook Parkway; White Plains Road, Bradhurst Avenue	Route 41 service would no longer operate north of White Plains, ending at EJ Conroy Drive.; Route 43 would not change.
62	New Rochelle Transportation Center	→ AM ← PM	White Plains Transcenter	New England Thruway; Westchester Avenue	Service south of New Rochelle would be eliminated.; If a fare reciprocity agreement is not agreed upon with Metro-North, this route will remain as it is.
112	Riverdale, Bronx; 242nd Street and Broadway at Van Cortlandt Park–242nd Street ( train)	→ AM ← PM	SUNY Westchester Community College and Westchester Medical Center	Broadway; Sprain Brook Parkway	New route created from portions of the former 1X route.; In Yonkers, service would instead operate on Yonkers Avenue to Central Avenue, then via the Sprain Brook Parkway.

== Former and Unused routes ==
Route	Terminals			Major streets	Notes
1A	Yonkers; Nepperhan Plaza at Yonkers Metro-North Station	↔	242 Street subway station		Replaced by the current 1 route.
1B	Unknown destination	↔	242 Street subway station		Replaced by the current 1 route.
1C	Unknown destination	↔	242 Street subway station		Replaced by the current 1 route.
6U	Yonkers; Nepperhan Plaza at Yonkers Metro-North Station	↔	Pleasantville; Bedford Road and Wheeler Avenue at Pleasantville Metro-North Station		Was a rush hour variant of the 6 route, operating via Uniontown in Hastings-On-Hudson.; Discontinued on March 7, 2016, due to low ridership, all 6U trips absorbed into the 6.
12X	White Plains; White Plains TransCenter	↔	Yorktown; Jefferson Valley Mall		Discontinuation date is unverified, presumably phased out either in the mid-2000s or when the 12 local was truncated from Jefferson Valley Mall to Armonk in 2010.; Operated as a limited stop express variant of the 12 route, providing commuter service between White Plains and Jefferson Valley Mall.
13B	Ossining; Ossining (Metro-North station) and Ferry Terminal	↔	Port Chester Railroad Station		Was a variant of the 13 route, operating via Benedict Avenue in Tarrytown.; Some trips used to operate to Playland during the summer.; Discontinued on September 4, 2018, due to low ridership, absorbed into 13 trips
14C	White Plains; North Broadway and Main Street	↔	Westchester Medical Center		Was a variant of the 14 route.; Variant was truncated to Skyline Drive, then became the Route 27 “Skyline Drive” in June 1993.
14X	White Plains; North Broadway and Main Street	↔	Croton-On-Hudson; Croton-Harmon RR Station		Was a variant of the 14 route.; Relabeled to Route 11 “Express - Croton” in June 1993.; Still exists, although bus signs does not show it as 14X and express service extended to Cortlandt Town Center.
15X	White Plains	↔	Peekskill	Taconic State Parkway	Began sometime in either 2007 or 2008 as an express variant of the 15, using the Taconic between Pleasantville and Yorktown.; Variant did not last long and was discontinued in 2009.
17 (first use)	Ossining; Ossining (Metro-North station) and Ferry Terminal	↔	Dobbs Ferry; Cedar Street at Ashford Avenue		Discontinued in the early 1990s when the 13 was rerouted to serve the northern part of the 17, and the 1 was extended and split into three different branches to serve the southern part of the 17.
18 (first use)	White Plains	↔	Pleasantville (Pace University)	Broadway, Columbus Avenue	Operated by White Plains & Pleasantville Bus Lines; Discontinued 1985
18 (first use)	White Plains	↔	Chappaqua (Rush Hours)	Broadway, Columbus Avenue	Operated by White Plains & Pleasantville Bus Lines; Discontinued 1985
19G	Katonah station Katonah Avenue and Jay Street	↔	Westchester Medical Center		Introduced on September 6, 1993; Added as a new route to connect Northern Westchester to the Westchester Medical Center; Operated hourly on weekdays and every two hours on Saturdays; Unknown when discontinued, likely before the 2000s
22	White Plains; Garretson Road	↔	Somers; Somerstown Turnpike and Goldens Bridge Road		Discontinued by 2000.
23	Yonkers; Getty Square	↻	Yonkers; Alexander Street	Loring Avenue, McLean Avenue, Central Park Avenue, Yonkers Avenue	Discontinued on May 27, 2008, due to low ridership.
24	The Bronx; 238th Street and White Plains Road	↔	Getty Square; Yonkers RR Station		During summer months, some trips operated via Tibbets Brook Park (also via Midland Avenue).; Discontinued by 1989.
31	Getty Square; Yonkers RR Station	↻	Getty Square; Yonkers RR Station		Discontinued by 2000.
33 (first use)	Bronxville; Bronxville RR Station	↻	Bronxville; Bronxville RR Station		Discontinued by 2000.
33	Mahopac (Putnam County); NY Route 6 and NY Route 6N	↔	Croton Falls; Croton Falls (Metro-North station)		Croton Falls shuttle.; Discontinued on December 31, 2004, due to very low ridership.; Route transfer to Coach USA's ShortLine.
35	FDR State Park, Yorktown Heights	↔	White Plains		Unconfirmed / Ghost Signage (Seen on fleet destination signs but not on timetables); Known as Link Rail Express on fleet signs.; While the exact routing is unconfirmed, this historical or proposed route is presumably intended as a seasonal service (TBD, might not be seasonal) connecting White Plains and select Metro-North Harlem Line stations to FDR State Park.
37	Hartsdale; Hartsdale RR Station	↔	White Plains; Garretson Road		Operated via White Plains Transit Center.; Discontinued by 2000.
43 (First use)	Mount Vernon	↔	White Plains Platinum Mile	White Plains Post Road, Westchester Avenue	"The Chief Gramatan"; Operated as a rush hour service between Mount Vernon and the Platinum Mile via White Plains Post Road; Began service in September 1983, unknown when discontinued
44	New Rochelle	↔	White Plains Platinum Mile	North Avenue, White Plains Post Road, Westchester Avenue	"Tom Paine Express"; Operated via North Avenue and White Plains Post Road; Non-stop between Eastchester Square and White Plains; Began service in September 1983, unknown when discontinued
46	Tuckahoe; Tuckahoe RR Station	↔	Eastchester; Eastchester RR Station		Discontinued by 2000.
47	Scarsdale; Donnybrook Road and Top O The Ridge Drive	↔	New Rochelle; Lawton Street and Main Street		Discontinued by 2000.
48	Larchmont; Larchmont RR Station	↔	New Rochelle; Hudson Park and Beach		Discontinued by 2000.
49	Armonk	↔	White Plains		Unconfirmed Route, (Seen on fleet destination signs but not on timetables); The real trace of this route is unverified. This designation is either a defunct historical route or proposed redesignation of the current 12 route between White Plains and Armonk
50	Pelham; Pelham RR Station	↔	New Rochelle; New Rochelle RR Station	Pelham Road, Pelhamdale Avenue, Drake Avenue, Center Avenue	Discontinued in 1993 when route 45 was extended south of New Rochelle to the Pelham Bay Subway Station via Shore Road.; Service on Drake Avenue and Pelham Road north of Franklin Avenue was not replaced.
51	Pelham Bay Park, Bronx	↔	New Rochelle; Main Street and Division Street		Discontinued by 2000.
56	New Rochelle; New Rochelle MNRR Station	↔	Bronxville; Bronxville MNRR Station		Discontinued by 2000.
59	Sloatsburg	↔	White Plains; Main Street and North Broadway		Discontinued by 2000.
67	White Plains; Soundview Avenue and Prescott Avenue	↔	White Plains; White Plains RR Station		Discontinued by 2000.
68	White Plains; Ridgeway and Hathaway Lane	↔	White Plains; White Plains RR Station		Discontinued by 2000.
69	Scarsdale; Hathaway Road and Ridgeway	↔	White Plains; White Plains RR Station	Gedney Way, Old Mamaroneck Road, Greenridge Avenue	Discontinued by 1996.
72	Dobbs Ferry; Dobbs Ferry RR Station	↔	Hartsdale; Heatherdell Road and Concord Road		Discontinued by 2000.
74	Port Chester Loop	↔	unknown		Route most likely discontinued in the late 1990s, unknown destinations
75 (first use)	White Plains at White Plains RR Station	↔	Purchase; SUNY Purchase		Operated via Anderson Hill Road and Manhattanville College.; Discontinued in 1994 when route 12 was rerouted via Anderson Hill Road and replaced route 75.
76	Port Chester; Kohl's Shopping Center	↻	Rye; Playland		Shuttle / Loop service.; Discontinued on December 31, 2011.; Parts of its former routing was absorbed into the extended 13 routing into Rye and Playland Park.
77 (first use)	Rye; Rye RR Station	↔	Purchase; SUNY Purchase	Boston Post Road, Main Street, Putnam Avenue, King Street, Anderson Hill Road	Discontinued in 1995.; Service on Anderson Hill Road was replaced by route 12, but service south of Anderson Hill Road and King Street was not replaced.
78 (first use)	Rye; Rye RR Station	↔	White Plains; White Plains RR Station		Discontinued by 2000.
Airlink	White Plains Transcenter	↔	Westchester County Airport		Non-stop express service.; Also known as route 79. Created on June 18, 2007.; Service discontinued on February 15, 2010. Service to the airport was replaced by route 12.
84	Kent (Putnam County); Ludingtonville Road and I-84, exit 17 (Park and Ride)	↔	White Plains Platinum Mile	I-684, Westchester Avenue	"Harlem Valley Express"; Operated from "Putnam County points" and ran through Somers, Goldens Bridge, Katonah, Mount Kisco, and other points along I-684; Stops were at or near I-684 ramps; Ran throughout the day; Discontinued in 1999 due to low ridership.
87 (first use)	New York City	↔	White Plains Transcenter		Discontinued by 1999.
90	Fordham, Bronx	↔	Rye; Playland		Discontinued in Spring 2003, as the routing mirrored the 60 and 91 routes. (presumable guess); Operated during the summer, connecting Fordham to Playland via Mamaroneck Avenue and Boston Post Road corridors.
92	White Plains Transcenter	↔	Rye; Playland		Discontinued in Labor Day 2011, when the 13 was extended to Playland Park/Rye.; Provided direct summer connections between White Plains Transcenter and Playland; Although the 13 extension did not happen until December 31, 2011. This likely contribute to the 92 being discontinued
93	Pelham Bay Park, Bronx	↔	Rye; Playland		Discontinued by Labor Day 2000; Seasonal Summer Route; Served as an East Bronx seasonal feeder, connecting Pelham Bay Park (6), Co-op City and Playland.
94	Yonkers	↔	Glen Island Park		Unconfirmed / Ghost signage (Seen on fleet destination signs but not on timetables); Service Type was probably a proposed Seasonal Summer route; Likely intended as a seasonal service linking Yonkers and Glen Island Park, unlike most 90s series, this route was designed specifically for Glen Island rather than Rye Playland; The proposed alignment would have largely mirrored the 7/91 corridor between Yonkers and New Rochelle.; Likely abandoned due to low projected ridership for a direct Yonkers-Glen Island connection
95	Stamford Transportation Center	↔	White Plains		Unused / Replaced by the CT Transit's 971 route; Proposed joint initiative between Westchester DOT, CTDOT and Metro-North to connect the Harlem Line at White Plains directly with New Haven line stations and hubs in Connecticut (specifically Greenwich/Stamford); Route was eventually shifted to CT Transit's planning, became today's CT Transit's I-Bus (today's 971).
96	Tibbets Brook Park	↔	Yonkers		Unconfirmed / Ghost signage (Seen on fleet destination signs but not on timetables); Proposed Local Summer shuttle route.; The route was likely canceled as the initiative was to reduce local vehicular/rideshare congestion and providing direct summer pool access for transit-dependent Yonkers residents without requiring transfers to the 20/21 buses.
99	Poughkeepsie or Fishkill	↔	White Plains		Unconfirmed / Ghost signage (Seen on fleet destination signs but not on timetables); Proposed Long-Haul Inter-County Express; Planned express route intended to connect Dutchess County Hubs (Poughkeepsie and Fishkill) to White Plains.; The service likely never launched under Bee Line due to the operational complexity and high costs of running a 50+ mile inter-county route.; The corridor concept likely went to private regional operators (such as Leprechaun Lines), Fishkill is seen as an alternate short turn terminus for this route
Loop E	White Plains Transcenter	↔	Purchase; 2000 Westchester Avenue	Manhattanville Road	Discontinued on June 28, 2010, due to a budget crisis.
Loop G	North White Plains	↔	Westchester Medical Center		Discontinued on February 18, 2008, due to low ridership.
Loop T	Tarrytown (Metro-North station)	↔	Tarrytown; Kraft Foods	White Plains Road	Also known as Route 89; Discontinued on June 28, 2010, due to a budget crisis.
BxM4D	Tarrytown	↔	Midtown, Manhattan or Lower Manhattan		Westchester - Manhattan express bus service.; Originally Route 29 "East Side Express", operating via 2nd and 3rd Avenues in Manhattan to 38th Street.; Renumbered BxM4D circa 1983, rerouted to mirror the BxM4C routing in Manhattan.; Operated northbound and southbound rush hour trips, including select extended service to Lower Manhattan; The discontinuation date is unknown, probably discontinued in the early 90s. Likely discontinued due to competition from the parallel Metro-North Hudson Line (Metro-North) service to/from Tarrytown.
