= Westchester County Airport =

Public airport in Westchester County, New York

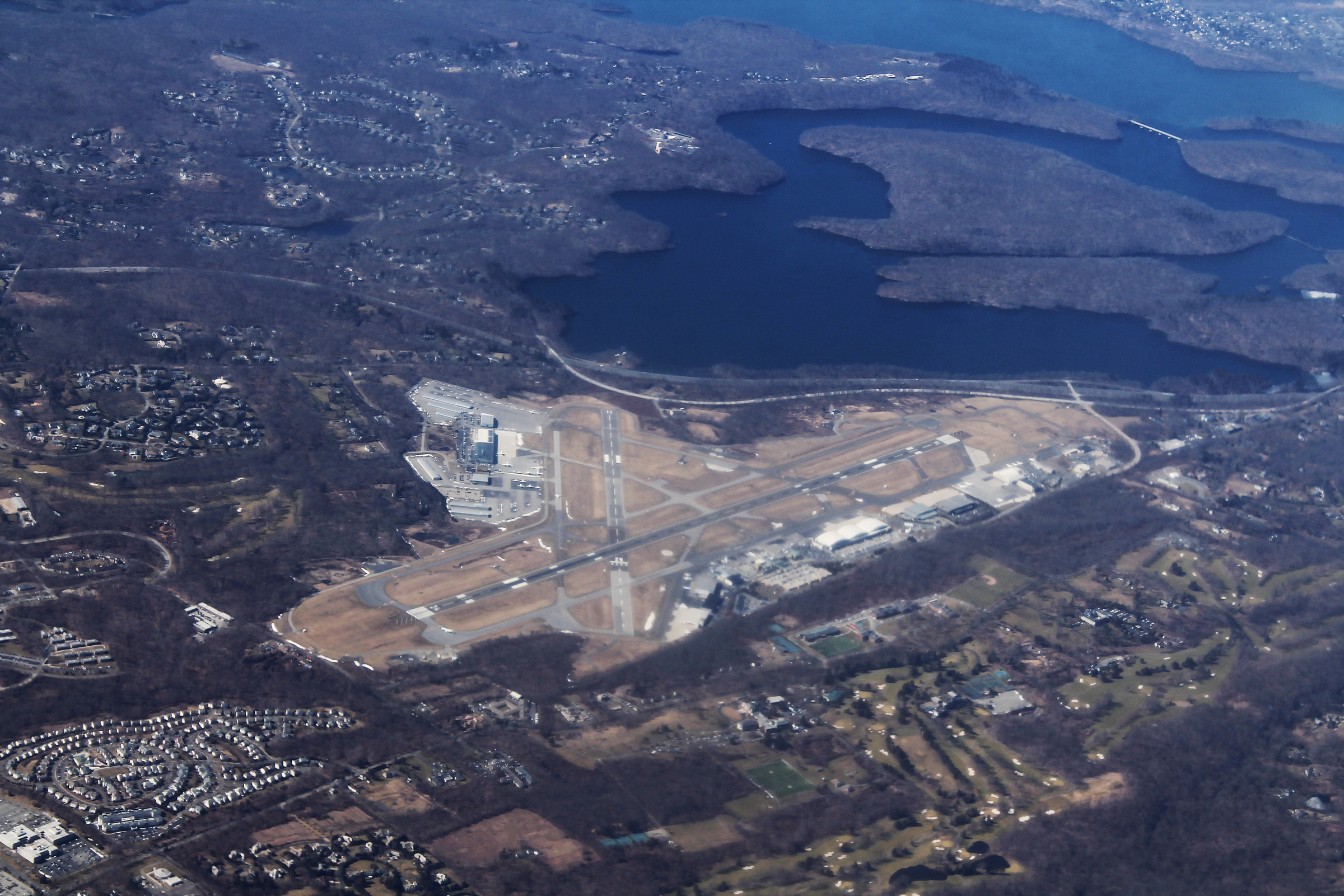
- Aerial view of the airport in 2013
- IATA: HPN; ICAO: KHPN; FAA LID: HPN

Summary
- Airport type: Public-use
- Owner: County of Westchester
- Operator: AvPORTS
- Serves: Hudson Valley, Western Connecticut, and New York metropolitan area
- Location: North Castle, Harrison, and Rye Brook, New York, U.S.
- Hub for: Tradewind Aviation
- Elevation AMSL: 439 ft (134 m)
- Coordinates: 41°04′01″N 073°42′27″W
- Website: airport.westchestergov.com

Maps
- FAA airport diagram
- Interactive map of Westchester County Airport

Runways
Direction	Length		Surface
Direction	ft	m	Surface
11/29	4,451	1,357	Asphalt
16/34	6,549	1,996	Asphalt

Statistics
- Aircraft operations (2023): 158,764
- Fixed-wing based aircraft (2023): 260
- Scheduled enplaned arrival/departure revenue passengers (2025): 2,313,000
- Source: FAA and official airport website

Westchester County Airport (IATA: HPN, ICAO: KHPN, FAA LID: HPN) is a growing county-owned airport in Westchester County, New York, United States, three nautical miles (3.5 mi; 5.6 km) northeast of downtown White Plains, with territory in the towns of North Castle and Harrison, New York, and the village of Rye Brook, New York. It is sometimes referred to as the White Plains Airport and is so identified by the Official Airline Guide (OAG).

The airport primarily serves Westchester County, New York, and Fairfield County, Connecticut; the New York–Connecticut state border runs along its eastern perimeter. Located approximately 33 miles (53 km) north of Midtown Manhattan, it is also considered a satellite or reliever airport for the New York metropolitan area.

The National Plan of Integrated Airport Systems for 2011–2015 categorized HPN as a primary commercial service airport. In 2025, Westchester County Airport served 2,313,000 passengers, its highest passenger volume ever prior to 2026.

== History ==
Westchester County Airport was built during World War II in 1942 as a home to an Air National Guard unit to protect New York City and Rye Lake, part of the city's water supply system. In May 1983, with the growth of suburban Westchester and a strategic shift from defensive operations to cargo missions, the Guard unit abandoned Westchester Air National Guard Base and moved to Stewart International Airport, in Orange County.

The first scheduled airline flights were by American Airlines in late 1949 with a weekday morning flight from New York LaGuardia Airport (LGA) to HPN continuing to Syracuse Hancock International Airport (SYR) and beyond and returning in the evening. Mohawk Airlines replaced American in 1955; Mohawk and successor Allegheny Airlines served HPN until 1979. The first scheduled jet flight was a Mohawk BAC One-Eleven in 1965. According to the March 1, 1967 Mohawk system timetable, the airline was operating nonstop BAC One-Eleven jet service to both Rochester, NY (ROC) and Newark International Airport (EWR) as well as direct one stop BAC One-Eleven flights to Buffalo, NY (BUF) and also direct one stop BAC One-Eleven flights from Toronto (YYZ). Before the federal Airline Deregulation Act in 1978, the airport was being served in 1976 by Allegheny Airlines BAC One-Elevens and by several commuter air carriers including Air Speed, Command Airways and Commuter Airlines. Air Florida arrived in 1980 and United Airlines during the mid-1980s. American Airlines also resumed mainline service. Regional carrier Independence Air ceased operations at HPN on January 5, 2006.

Major airlines that previously served the airport include American Airlines, Northwest Airlines, Republic Airlines (1979-1986), United Airlines and USAir (now part of American Airlines). New start up carriers Air Florida, AirTran Airways, Carnival Air Lines, Midway Airlines and New York Air also served the airport. AirTran Airways began service at the airport in 2006 with flights to Atlanta, Orlando and West Palm Beach. These flights ended on August 11, 2012. Smaller regional and commuter air carriers that previously operated flights included Air North, Altair Airlines, Business Express Airlines, Boston-Maine Airways (operating as Pan Am Clipper Connection), Brockway Air, Command Airways, Commuter Airlines, Continental Express (now United Express), Empire Airlines, Independence Air, Island Air, Mall Airways and USAir Express. These airlines operated the following jets to the airport:

- Air Florida – Boeing 737-200
- AirTran – Boeing 717-200
- Allegheny Airlines – BAC One-Eleven
- American Airlines – Fokker 100
- Carnival Air Lines – Boeing 737-200
- Continental Express – Embraer ERJ-135 (operated by ExpressJet for Continental Airlines)
- Empire Airlines – Fokker F28 Fellowship
- Midway Airlines – Douglas DC-9-10
- Mohawk Airlines – BAC One-Eleven
- New York Air – McDonnell Douglas DC-9-32
- Northwest Airlines – McDonnell Douglas DC-9-30
- Northwest Jetlink (operated by Mesaba Airlines on behalf of Northwest Airlines) - Avro RJ85
- Republic Airlines (1979-1986) – McDonnell Douglas DC-9-30
- United Airlines – Boeing 737-200, 737-300 and 737-500
- USAir – Fokker 100

In the summer of 1981 Air Florida's timetable listed international nonstop Boeing 737-200 service to Bermuda from the airport.

In June 2005, a drunken teenager and two of his friends stole a Cessna 172 from nearby Danbury Municipal Airport around 1 a.m. and landed on a taxiway at Westchester County Airport around 4 a.m. The aircraft was low on fuel and allegedly flying erratically. HPN airport was closed at the time and no runway lights were illuminated. Police arrived on the scene and reported beer bottles falling out of the aircraft as they arrested the teens, all of whom were charged with various felonies relating to the unauthorized use of the aircraft, theft, and alcohol impairment.

JetBlue began service at the airport in 2007 and is currently the airport's largest carrier by scheduled passengers.

In June 2009, Cape Air commenced service to Westchester with flights to Martha's Vineyard and Nantucket in Massachusetts. They then introduced service to Lebanon (NH) in early 2010. In Summer 2022, they eliminated all flights out of White Plains except for subsidized essential air service routes from Lebanon.

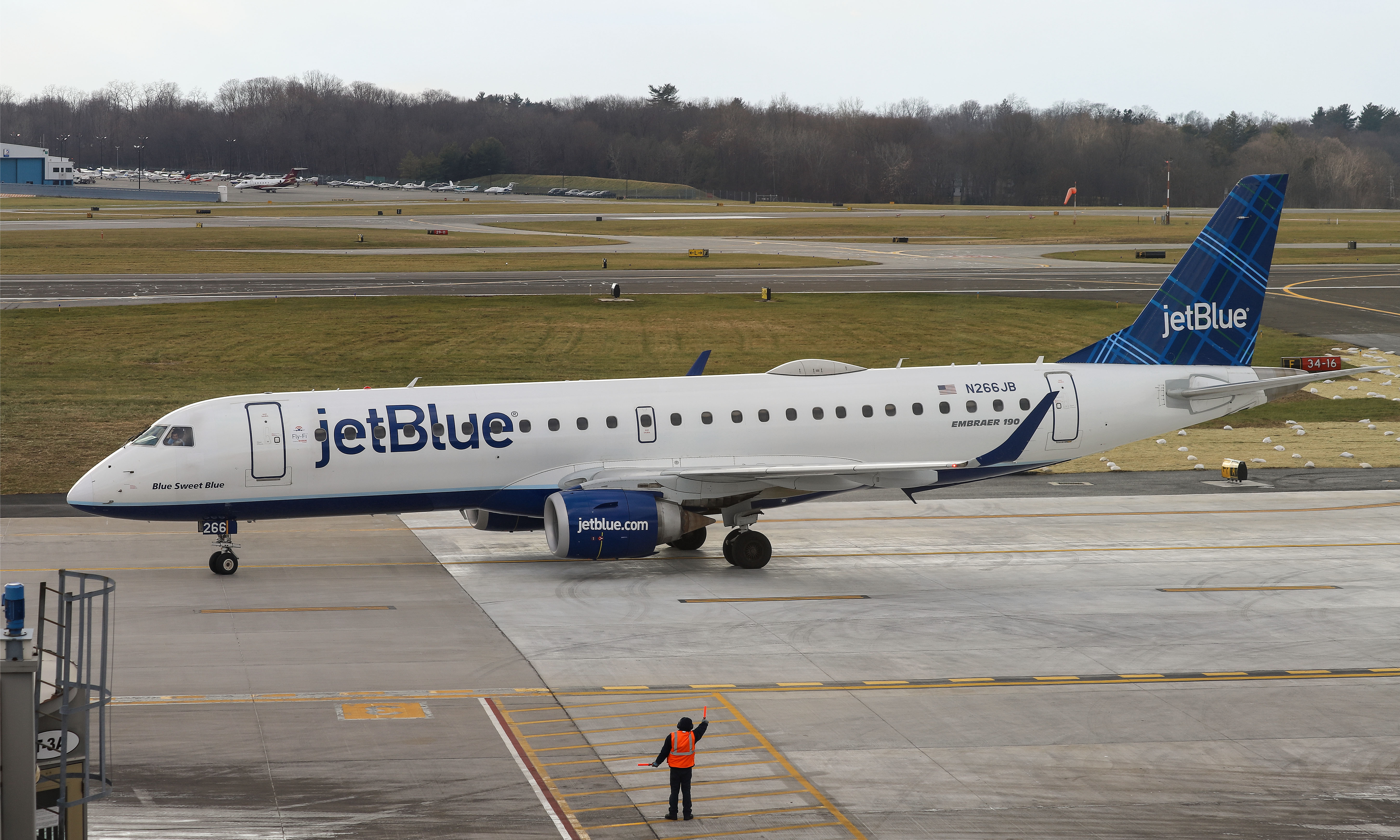
JetBlue has served Westchester since 2007

In May 2011, the New York State Department of Transportation published the "New York Statewide Airport Economic Impact Study," highlighting the economic impacts of public-use airports in New York state for fiscal year 2009. The study noted that HPN was one of only three airports in the state that increased its enplanements, surpassing the U.S. benchmark. It also noted that the cumulative economic activity for the airport was approximately $736 million.

On April 27, 2020, the airport was closed to general aviation traffic for one week and commercial airlines for about a month so Runway 16/34 could be repaved, a project originally scheduled to span four months with construction only occurring from midnight to 6 AM. This decision was made in the midst of COVID-19 pandemic-related air travel cuts, which drastically reduced commercial airline service to the airport. Some operators were forced to ferry their aircraft to nearby airports where they could continue flights. This was the first total shutdown of a U.S. commercial airport for reasons relating to the COVID-19 pandemic.

On April 20, 2022, Breeze Airways announced several new routes from the airport, including the airport's first-ever commercial transcontinental services – although all of the transcontinental routes were later cut.

United Airlines ended service at Westchester County in 2023 due to a shortage of pilots.

== Facilities and aircraft ==
Westchester County Airport covers 702 acres (284 ha) at an elevation of 439 feet (134 m) above mean sea level. It has two asphalt paved runways: 16/34 is 6,549 by 150 feet (1,996 by 46 m) and 11/29 is 4,451 by 150 feet (1,357 by 46 m). Runway 29's threshold is displaced 1,297 feet (395 m) due to trees obstructing the approach path. The trees (in Connecticut) are 37 ft (11 m) tall and 370 ft (110 m) from the end of the runway.

Westchester County Airport has several fixed-base operators (FBOs), including Signature Flight Support East and West, Atlantic Aviation East and West, NetJets, and Million Air. Although varied in services offered, the FBOs at Westchester County Airport provide Jet A and 100LL fueling services, repairs and maintenance, aircraft tie-downs, de-icing, United States Customs, and other aircraft services.

Westchester County Airport is also the home of the New York Wing Civil Air Patrol headquarters, the Lt. Anthony L. Willsea Cadet Squadron (NY-422).

Aircraft Rescue Fire Fighting (ARFF) is provided by Airport Operations Crews. The airport owns three ARFF apparatuses (three Oshkosh Striker 1500s), two of which are in service full-time. The ARFF Crews only respond to aircraft emergencies. All structure-related fire and rescue calls are deferred to the local fire departments. The Purchase Fire Department, for example, handles all structure calls on the southern part of the airfield, the Armonk Fire Department handles calls on the northern part and the Rye Brook/Port Chester Fire Department handle all calls on the east end, including the main terminal. EMS calls are handled by Port Chester-Rye-Rye Brook EMS, Harrison EMS and Armonk Fire/EMS depending on location of call.

In 2010, the airport had 191,017 total aircraft operations, an average of 523 per day: 23% commercial aviation, 48% heavy general aviation, and 29% light general aviation. 316 aircraft, including helicopters, are based out of this airport. An aircraft must have a maximum gross weight of 120,000 pounds or less, or permission from the manager, to land at the airport.

=== Terminal ===
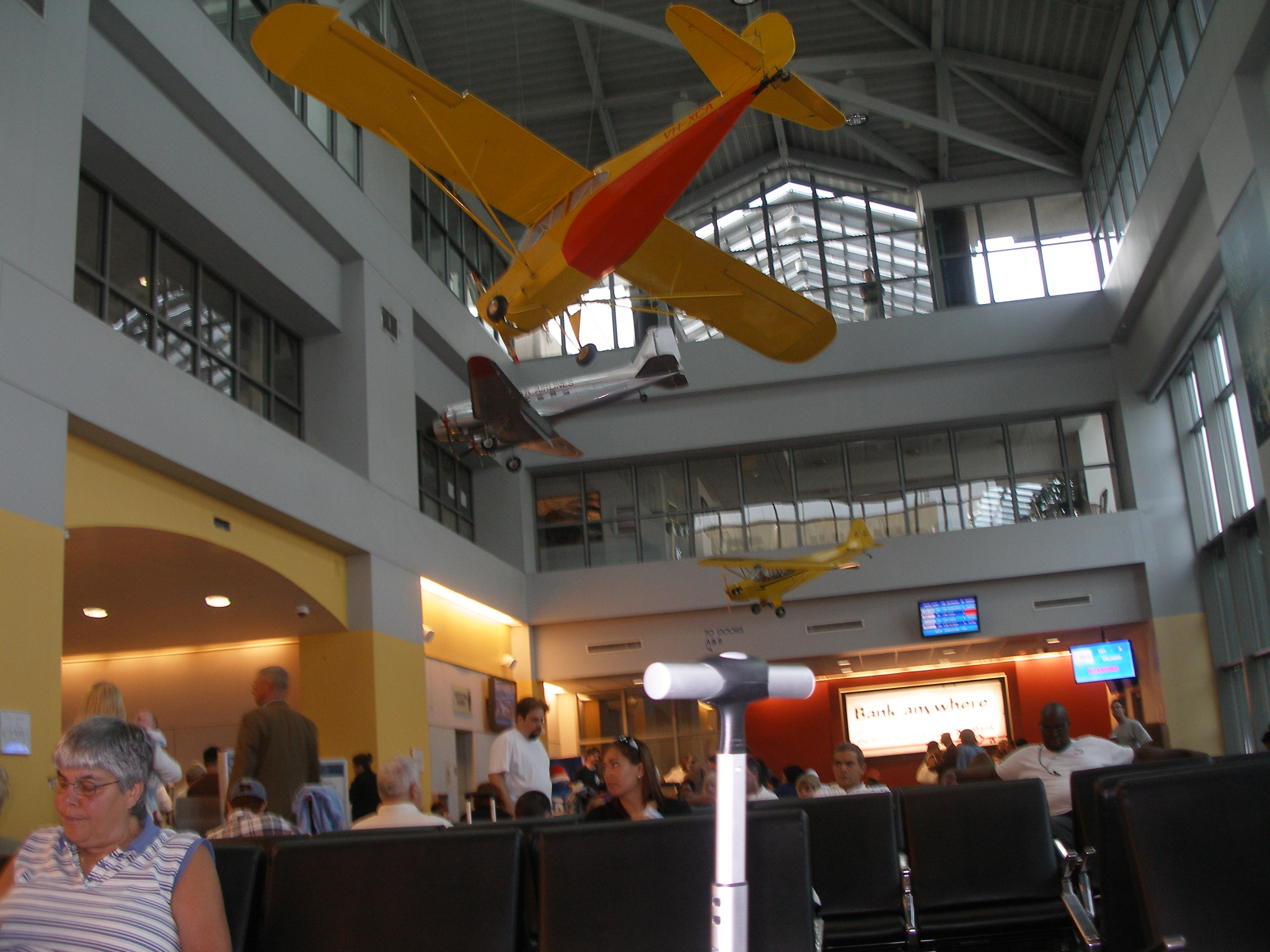
The gate area in the main terminal prior to expansion

Westchester County Airport has one small, three-level terminal with six gates, of which only four can be used simultaneously because only four aircraft can be scheduled to use the terminal's ramp at any given time. The $35 million terminal was built in 1995 and designed by Lothrop Associates. Gates 1, 2, 3, and 4 have jetways. The terminal also has a luggage carousel, a baggage claim office and two Transportation Security Administration (TSA) screening lanes. Passenger amenities include a gift shop, departure lounge, and food concessions.

In November 2015, the airport began a $30 million construction project to expand the terminal and ramp areas. The project expanded the terminal by 20% and include additional check-in, screening and passenger waiting areas. The expansion also included the addition of four new jet bridges. A separate terminal with "lodge-like ambiance" to serve passengers of private jets opened in 2019.

In March of 2026, the county announced its intention to proceed with another modernization of the terminal, selecting HNTB as the primary consultant for design and planning.

== Operations ==
In its effort to mitigate aircraft noise pollution in neighboring communities, HPN maintains six major noise abatement programs that are in effect daily.

One of them is its Voluntary Restraint from Flying Program (VRFF), sometimes referred to as a voluntary curfew, that helps assuage anti-airport complainants by requesting—not mandating—that operators refrain from flying into the airport between midnight and 6:30 AM. Those that breach the VRFF are reminded of the initiative and notified of any noise complaints that may have resulted from their operations.

The airport's Airport Noise and Operations Monitoring System (ANOMS) collects noise data from remote noise-monitoring terminals, and both registered aircraft and community noise levels are published in the Airport Monitor. This system works in conjunction with the High Range Noise Event (HRNE) Program; ANOMS staff can identity any operator who causes a maximum noise level event of 90.0 decibels or higher at any of its remote noise monitor terminals and advise them in order to prevent future noise level transgressions. As of September 2020, there are no fines, penalties, or aircraft restrictions associated with this program.

Additionally, HPN prohibits intersection takeoffs from its runways and restricts maintenance run-ups & the use of reverse thrust. It also employs Advanced Authorization for operations.

The airport's environmental management performance is monitored through its ISO 14001 certified Airport Environmental Management System (AEMS). This enables operators to report the airport's impacts on surface water, groundwater, and noise. Airport-wide environmental management practices are also continually revised with this technology, and annual objectives and targets are determined to avoid or mitigate adverse environmental impacts. In addition, airport employees receive environmental training. In 2004, HPN was the third airport in the U.S. to achieve this level of environmental performance.

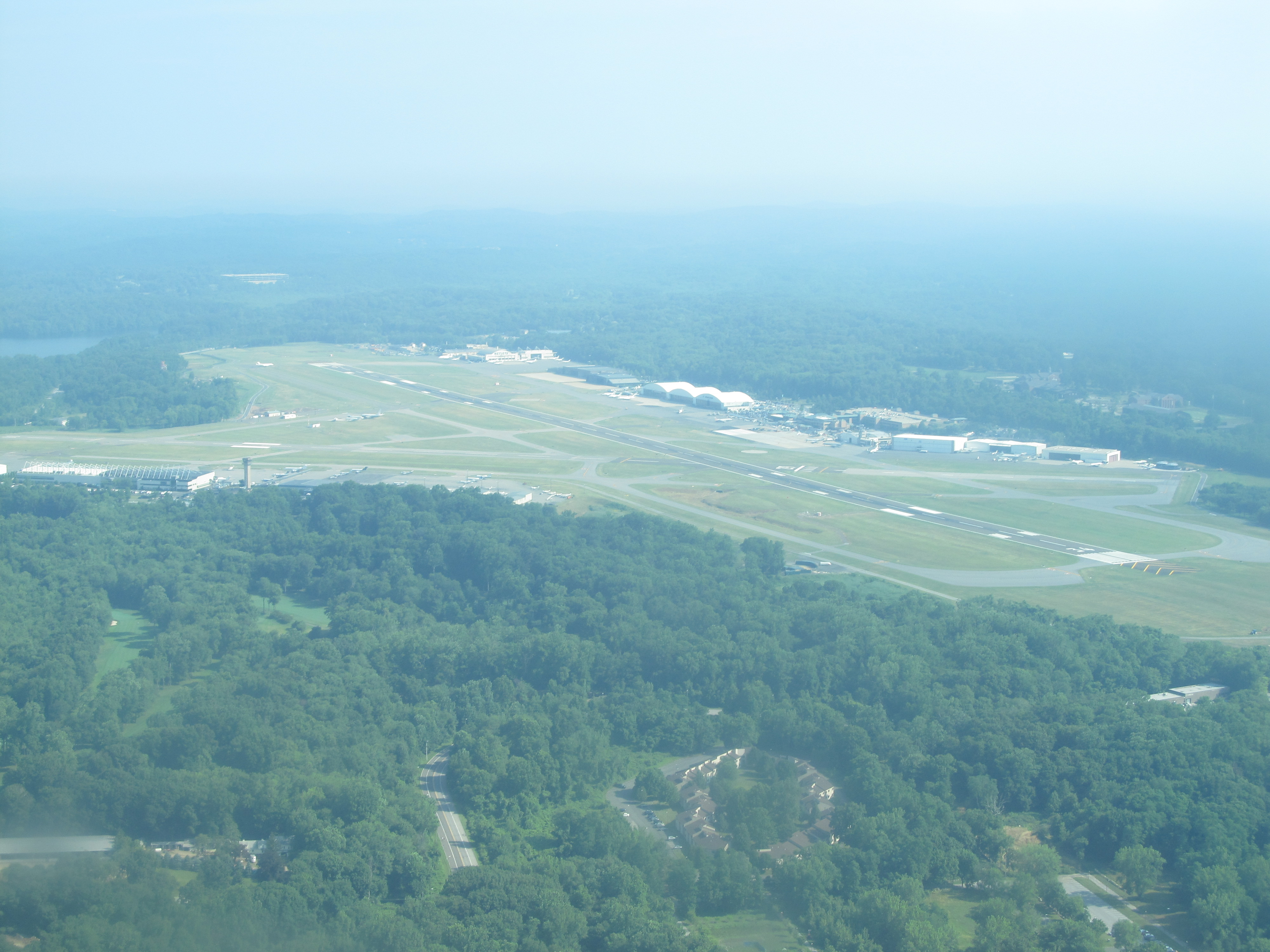
An aerial view of the airport in 2016.

=== Controversies ===
Expansion of the airport has raised concerns over adverse environmental impacts by numerous community advocacy groups and area residents. The facility lies between the Blind Brook watershed and the Rye Lake watershed/Kensico Reservoir. The Citizens for a Responsible County Airport, which count the Sierra Club Lower Hudson and Federated Conservationists of Westchester as supporters, has raised safety concerns about the stormwater runoff directed towards Westchester and New York City's drinking water supply. They are especially alarmed about PFAS discovered in groundwater tests between the Airport and the Kensico watershed.

In addition to the longtime controversy over the airport and its proposed expansions, concerns have also arisen regarding travelers seeking relief from long delays at the other New York metropolitan area airports, such as John F. Kennedy International Airport (JFK) and LaGuardia Airport (LGA). More recently, these concerns pertain to flight paths and vehicular congestion. The latter has been addressed by the County of Westchester with the introduction of Bee-Line Bus service from downtown White Plains, and the encouragement of carpooling.

== Access ==
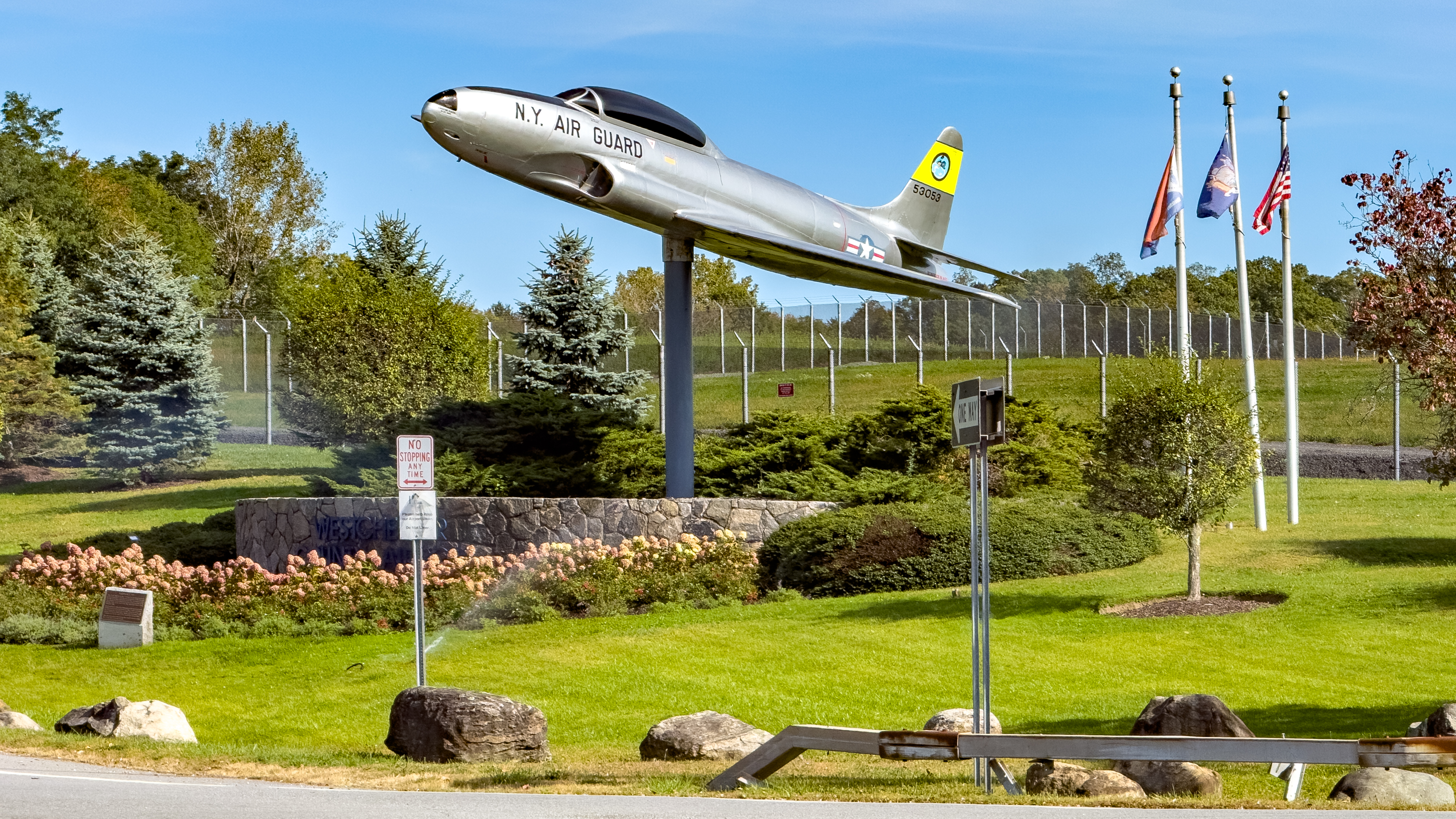
Lockheed T-33B as seen from Route 120

=== Car ===
The airport can be accessed from I-684's Exit 2 onto New York State Route 120, via County Route 135. It can also be accessed by New York State Route 120A from the east, via Rye Lake Avenue.

=== Public transportation ===
Bus connections
System	Route(s)	Refs
Bee-Line Bus	12	

Bee-Line Route 12 provides regular daily service between the passenger terminal and the White Plains TransCenter and the adjacent White Plains Metro-North Railroad station in White Plains – in addition to SUNY Purchase College and Manhattanville University in Purchase.

== Airlines and destinations ==
Airlines	Destinations
American Eagle	Charlotte, Chicago–O'Hare, Washington–National; Seasonal: Miami
BermudAir	Bermuda
BladeOne	Seasonal charter: Miami–Opa Locka, West Palm Beach
Breeze Airways	Charleston (SC), Myrtle Beach, Raleigh/Durham, Savannah, Vero Beach; Seasonal: Sarasota
Cape Air	Lebanon (NH); Seasonal: Martha’s Vineyard
Delta Air Lines	Atlanta
Delta Connection	Atlanta, Detroit, Minneapolis/St. Paul
JetBlue	Fort Lauderdale, Fort Myers, Orlando, San Juan, Tampa, West Palm Beach; Seasonal: Nantucket
JSX	Fort Lauderdale–Executive, Miami–Opa Locka, West Palm Beach; Seasonal: Naples (FL)

=== Helicopter ===
Airlines	Destinations
Blade	Manhattan–W 30th St, New York–JFK, Newark

== Statistics ==
=== Passenger numbers ===
Annual passenger traffic statistics, 2002–present
Year	Passengers	Year	Passengers	Year	Passengers	Year	Passengers
2002	707,000	2008	1,779,000	2014	1,489,000	2020	464,000
2003	816,000	2009	1,906,000	2015	1,490,000	2021	1,066,000
2004	890,000	2010	1,993,000	2016	1,506,000	2022	1,781,000
2005	895,000	2011	1,923,000	2017	1,500,000	2023	2,249,000
2006	980,000	2012	1,735,000	2018	1,548,000	2024	2,308,000
2007	1,615,000	2013	1,477,000	2019	1,723,000	2025	2,313,000

=== Carrier shares ===
Carrier shares January 2025 - December 2025)
1. JetBlue, 1,277,000 (55.2%)
2. PSA, 248,000 (10.7%)
3. Breeze, 239,000 (10.3%)
4. Endeavor Air, 192,000 (8.29%)
5. Envoy, 159,000 (6.88%)
6. Other carriers, 198,000 (8.57%)

Airline market share (January 2025 - December 2025)
Rank	Airline	Passengers	Market Share
1	JetBlue	1,277,000	55.23%
2	PSA Airlines	248,000	10.70%
3	Breeze Airways	239,000	10.33%
4	Endeavor Air	192,000	8.29%
4	Envoy	159,000	6.88%
6	Other	198,000	8.57%

=== Top destinations ===
Top 10 busiest domestic destinations from HPN (January 2025 - December 2025)
Rank	City	Passengers	Carrier(s)
1	West Palm Beach, Florida	197,220	JetBlue
2	Orlando, Florida	145,550	JetBlue
3	(Georgia (U.S. state)) Atlanta, Georgia	137,820	Delta
4	Fort Lauderdale, Florida	114,690	JetBlue
5	Fort Myers, Florida	81,540	JetBlue
6	Chicago–O'Hare, Illinois	71,610	American
7	Charlotte, North Carolina	67,830	American
8	(Virginia) Washington–National, D.C.	55,330	American
9	Tampa, Florida	47,850	JetBlue
10	Detroit, Michigan	41,550	Delta

== Accidents and incidents ==
- December 18, 1954: A Lockheed Model 18 Lodestar, aircraft registration number N711SE, clipped trees about 800 ft (240 m) before it struck the ground on a 680 ft (210 m) knoll located on the instrument landing system (ILS) approach path. The ceiling was 300 ft (91 m) with 1 mi (1.6 km) visibility. Both pilots were killed.
- February 11, 1981: A Lockheed Jetstar 731, registration N520S, crashed 6,000 ft (1,800 m) from the approach end of runway 16 into a heavily wooded area in Armonk, New York. The aircraft's electrical system had malfunctioned causing a deviation of the flightpath. The two crew and six passengers died.
- December 24, 1988: A Beechcraft A36 Bonanza, registration N555ST, crashed and was destroyed after departure in instrument meteorological conditions (IMC); the pilot and two passengers were killed. The crash occurred about 35 seconds after the pilot acknowledged an air traffic control (ATC) instruction to change radio frequencies, and witnesses reported that the aircraft was flying in a circle before impact. The National Transportation Safety Board (NTSB) attributed the accident to spatial disorientation, pilot distraction, and the pilot's failure to maintain the climb; poor visibility was a contributing factor.
- June 14, 1990: A Cessna 337G Skymaster, registration N72476, went into a stall and crashed after flying through low clouds on approach. The pilot, who did not have an instrument rating nor any documented experience with instrument flight rules (IFR) operations, had been given a special visual flight rules (SVFR) landing clearance after being advised of IMC at the airport. The aircraft was destroyed and the pilot and single passenger were killed. The NTSB attributed the accident to the pilot's decision to fly under visual flight rules into instrument meteorological conditions (VFR into IMC) and his subsequent loss of aircraft control. Bad weather and the pilot's lack of IFR experience were contributing factors.
- June 22, 2001: A Piper PA-32R-301, registration N13VH, struck the ground while the pilot was executing a missed approach in low visibility; the crash destroyed the aircraft and killed the pilot, who was the sole aircraft occupant. Immediately prior to the accident, the pilot had failed to respond to ATC, and performed a series of erratic ascents and descents. Post-crash toxicology tests found signs of chlorpheniramine, a sedating antihistamine, in the pilot's blood and urine. The National Transportation Safety Board (NTSB) attributed the accident to loss of control and spatial disorientation. Contributing factors were fog and the pilot's use of sedating medication.
- December 31, 2001: A Beechcraft BE-23-B24R Sierra, registration N2173W, lost altitude in a steep turn and crashed in a parking lot while maneuvering to land. The crash and ensuing fire destroyed the aircraft and killed the pilot, who was the sole aircraft occupant. The pilot had diverted to Westchester County Airport after losing radio communications; the cause of the radio failure was not conclusively determined. The NTSB attributed the accident to a loss of aircraft control.
- April 23, 2005: A Cessna 172R, registration N61AF, crashed into trees about 1 mile (1.6 km) short of runway 16 during a practice ILS approach in IMC. The aircraft was destroyed and the student pilot and flight instructor were killed. The NTSB attributed the accident to the pilot's failure to maintain adequate altitude. Contributing factors were low ceilings, fog, and gusty wind.
- On April 15, 2008, a Cessna Citation 560XL Excel, registration N613QS was landing on runway 16 when on touchdown, the gear and spoilers retracted with no command. The citation skidded down the runway, and was written off. No one was injured.
- June 18, 2011: A Cessna T210N, registration N210KW, crashed on approach after the pilot took off from Westchester County Airport, immediately declared an emergency of an unspecified nature, and attempted to return. The aircraft came to rest inverted and was consumed in a post-crash fire, killing the pilot and all three passengers. Witnesses reported that the engine ran poorly before the flight and that the pilot performed an unusually large number of engine runups, while post-crash examination of the engine found evidence of severe detonation and improper timing of one magneto. Furthermore, noise abatement recordings from the airport revealed that the engine was significantly quieter on approach than during departure, suggesting that the pilot had reduced the power setting. The NTSB attributed the accident to "The pilot's decision to depart on the flight with a suspected mechanical deficiency and his subsequent decision to fly the final approach at a reduced power setting. Contributing to the accident was the improper timing of the magneto(s) that resulted in a severe detonation event."
- June 13, 2014: A Piper PA-46-500TP, registration N5335R, crashed into trees at high speed immediately after an IMC takeoff, destroying the aircraft and killing the pilot, who was the sole occupant. Reportedly in a rush, the pilot arrived at the airport 1 hour and 15 minutes prior to his scheduled departure time, demanding that the aircraft be readied immediately; the aircraft departed 23 minutes later. The accident was attributed to "The pilot's failure to maintain a positive climb rate after takeoff due to spatial disorientation (somatogravic illusion). Contributing to the accident was the pilot's self-induced pressure to depart and his decision to depart in low-ceiling and low-visibility conditions."
- January 19, 2023: a Beechcraft A36 Bonanza, registration N19MT, crashed into trees on the northern edge of Rye Lake, which is located next the airport, killing both occupants, the pilot and a passenger. The aircraft, en route to Cuyahoga County Airport from John F. Kennedy International Airport, reported low oil pressure and then engine problems to White Plains ATC approximately a mile away from the airport at 5:25pm ET. 5 minutes later, contact with the aircraft was lost, before reportedly crashing at around 5:38pm ET. The FAA and NTSB are currently investigating the crash.
- December 12, 2024: a Tecnam P2008, registration N298PM, crashed around 6:45 PM on Interstate 684 near the airport, killing one aircraft occupant and critically injuring the other. The flight took off from Linden, New Jersey, around 6 PM. The pilot reported engine issues prior to the crash. The New York State Police, the FAA, and the NTSB initiated investigations.

== Airport code ==
The IATA code for Westchester County Airport is HPN. The origins of this code are in dispute. Some believe it is derived from the name of the city, White Plains (IATA codes normally do not begin with W because those are reserved for radio signals), while others maintain the IATA code represents the first letters of the airport's three neighboring communities, Harrison, Purchase, and North Castle. The full ICAO code for Westchester County Airport is KHPN.

== In popular culture ==
- The airport was a filming location for The Best Man, The Thomas Crown Affair, Meet The Parents and Random Hearts.
- In The West Wing episode "Celestial Navigation", Leo tells Toby and Sam to "Fly to Westchester County Airport and rent a car" to get their United States Supreme Court nominee, Roberto Mendoza, out of jail in Connecticut.
- In an episode of The Newsroom, Don Keefer explains to Sloan Sabbith that the most likely airports for out-of-town equity firm executives to use while visiting New York City in their private jets would be either "Teterboro or White Plains."
- In the 2000 film Shaft, Walter Wade Jr. lands in his personal jet in this airport after two-year flight from justice. After the landing, he is rearrested by John Shaft right in the airport.

== See also ==
- List of airports in New York (state)
- Aviation in the New York metropolitan area
