= Commuter Airlines =

U.S. airline operating from 1960 to 1984

- Commenced operations: 1964; 62 years ago
- Ceased operations: October 1984; 41 years ago
- Operating bases: Greater Binghamton Airport NY, Cleveland Hopkins International Airport
- Key people: Jerry Winston (Owner)

Commuter Airlines was a US regional commuter airline that operated from 1964 to 1984, based for many years at Greater Binghamton Airport, Broome County, New York, and later at Cleveland Hopkins International Airport. Beginning life as Broome County Aviation, the operation included local air taxi, manufacturing (& subsequently operating) modified Beech 18s, and scheduled services with 19- and 50-seat airliners to Washington D.C., and all three main airports in the New York Metropolitan area. In 1982 it was re-branded as Freedom Airlines, but following the death of the founder (Jerry Winston) in 1984, the airline ceased operations.

== History ==
Broome County Aviation, Inc, took over as the fixed-base operator (FBO) at Greater Binghamton Airport, New York in 1957, selling aviation fuel, operating a flight school and air charter service. In 1965 they began FAR part 135 scheduled flights with a Piper Aztec between Binghamton, NY and Washington National Airport D.C. operating as Commuter Airlines (CA Inc).

During the next two decades the airline side of the business expanded, increasing the number of destinations served to include White Plains, LaGuardia and JFK in New York City, Newark, Boston, Wilkes Barre/Scranton, and Allentown Pennsylvania, and others.

== Freedom Airlines ==
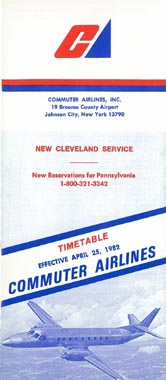
Commuter Airlines timetable, effective April 25th 1982 (featuring Swearingen Metroliner aircraft on cover)

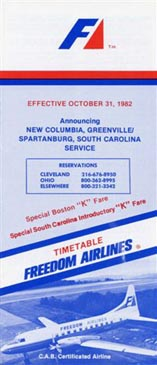
Freedom Airlines timetable effective October 31, 1982 (featuring Convair CV-580 aircraft on cover)

With the advent of the 1978 Airline Deregulation Act, in the late 70's and early 80's Commuter Airlines underwent dramatic expansion, concentrating the operation on two types; Swearingen Metroliners (flying as Commuter Airlines), and the Convair CV-580s (now flying as Freedom Airlines). By mid-1982 they had also consolidated their operations base at Cleveland Hopkins International Airport and re-branded themselves purely as Freedom Airlines. Meanwhile the route network grew rapidly to encompass a much wider variety of destinations such as Chicago (wef Aug '81), Baltimore (wef Jan '82), Allentown A-B-E Airport, (wef May '82), Norfolk, Detroit, and e.g. multiple destinations in South Carolina.

In the summer of 1984 founder Jerry Winston died, and the airline was put up for sale. Although still a going concern, without a buyer to take the helm, the airline ceased operations, with the Convair CV-580s being purchased by Air Ontario.

== Commuter Aircraft Manufacturing Corp ==
The Dumod Corporation was one of a number of companies that specialised in upgrading Beech 18s, primarily featuring a tricycle undercarriage replacement for the original tailwheel design. Their most ambitious project was the Dumod Liner, and the manufacturing rights for this conversion were purchased by Winston on behalf of BCA/Commuter Airlines. The Dumod Liner had a stretched fuselage allowing 15 seats, a nose wheel/tricycle undercarriage, and a triple tail similar to the Lockheed Constellation. Initially five conversions were planned, but only three were completed, and all three of this unique design were operated by Commuter Airlines.

== Fleet ==
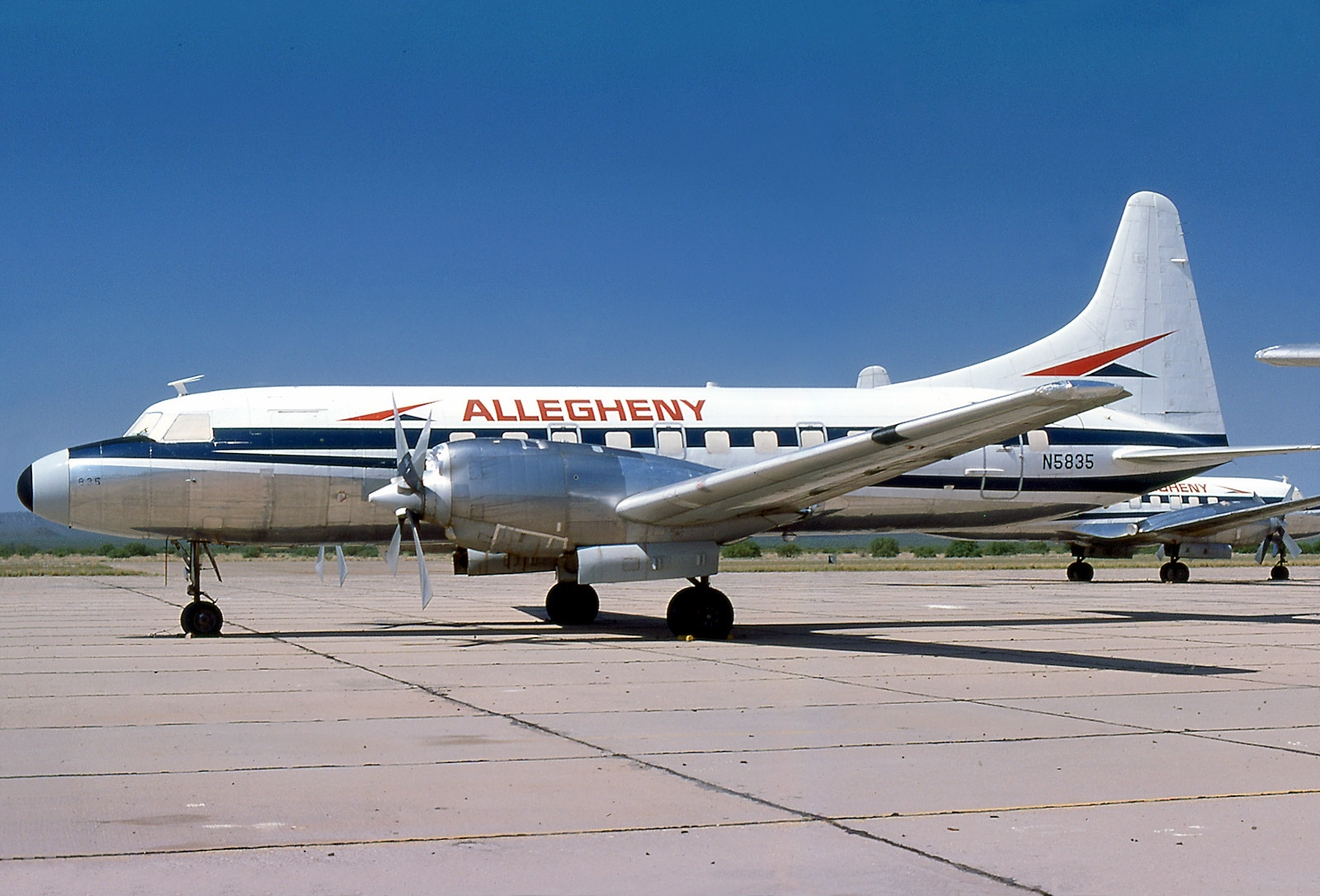
Convair CV-580 N5835 in 1976, one of five aircraft of this type, recently retired from Allegheny, pending sale to Commuter Airlines

The company began with a single Piper Aztec and over the years added Piper PA-31 Navajo/ Navajo Chieftains, Beechcraft Model 18s and of course the three Dumod Liners, before expanding with Swearingen Metroliners from 1973. In 1978, with the advent of deregulation, Commuter Airlines increased capacity by purchasing five Convair 580s from Allegheny/(USAir).

== Accidents and incidents ==
- On 22 March 1970, Commuter Airlines Flight 502 from Binghampton to Washington D.C., operated by Beech 18 (Dumod Liner) N497DM, crashed after a rejected take-off from Binghamton-Broome County Airport killing the Captain and two passengers. The co-pilot and seven remaining passengers survived.

After taking off in snow conditions, the aircraft became airborne, but was difficult to control even after the landing gear was raised. The captain elected to reject the take-off, and made a smooth wheels-up landing. The aircraft slid the remaining length of the runway, over an embankment, and into approach light structures, where it subsequently caught fire and was written off.
The NTSB report determined the probable cause of the accident was the attempt of the pilot-in command to take off with snow adhering to the airfoil surfaces, causing a degradation of aircraft performance and loss of control following lift-off.

== Destinations ==
- Illinois
  - Chicago O'Hare International Airport
- Maryland
  - Baltimore/Washington International Airport
- Massachusetts
  - Boston Logan International Airport
- Michigan
  - Bishop International Airport, Flint
  - Detroit Metropolitan Airport, Wayne County
  - Gerald R. Ford International Airport, Grand Rapids
  - Capital Region International Airport, Lansing
  - Saginaw
- New Jersey
  - Newark (Newark International Airport)
- New York
  - Binghamton (Binghamton Regional Airport) - hub
  - Elmira Corning Regional Airport
  - Ithaca Tompkins International Airport
  - New York (LaGuardia Airport)
  - White Plains (Westchester County Airport)
- Ohio
  - Akron–Canton Airport
  - Cleveland (Cleveland Hopkins International Airport)
- Pennsylvania
  - Allentown-Bethlehem-Easton Airport
  - Wilkes-Barre/Scranton International Airport
- South Carolina
  - Charleston International Airport
  - Columbia Airport
  - Greenville–Spartanburg International Airport
- Virginia
  - Norfolk International Airport
  - Washington, D.C. (Reagan National Airport)

== See also ==
- List of defunct airlines of the United States
