= White Plains TransCenter =

Bus terminal in White Plains

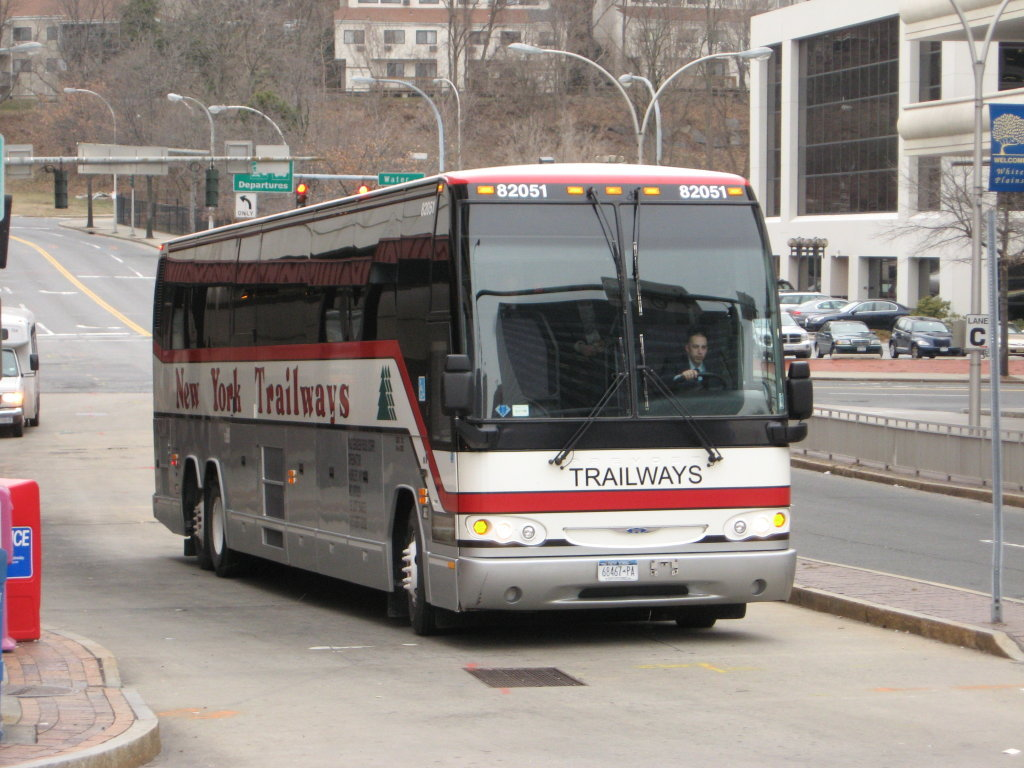
- A Trailways bus along the southbound bus lane

General information
- Location: Ferris Avenue & Water Street; White Plains, New York; United States
- Coordinates: 41°02′02″N 73°46′25″W
- Owner: Westchester County, New York or City of White Plains
- Bus routes: 25 Westchester routes 2 Short Line routes 1 ToR Route; 1 CT Stamford route 1 Leprechaun Line route 1 Greyhound route 1 Trailways of New York
- Bus stands: in lanes A, B, C, D, E & F
- Connections: Metro-North Railroad: White Plains

History
- Opened: 1987

Passengers
- daily: 25,000
Location

The White Plains TransCenter is an intermodal transit center in White Plains, New York. It serves as a terminal/transfer point for many Bee-Line Buses, as well as intercity buses, and taxicabs. The terminal is located along Ferris Avenue north of Hamilton Street (westbound NY 119), diagonally across from the White Plains station of Metro-North Railroad, and includes a parking garage located next door to the railroad station, across that street. Ferris Avenue is a one-way street north of Main Street (eastbound NY 119), and is flanked by northbound and southbound buses only lanes between Hamilton Street and Water Street.

The main building of the TransCenter can be found on the block along Ferris Avenue to the west, Water Street to the south, Lexington Avenue to the west, and New Street to the north, which is also covered by the building itself. The parking garage across the street also contains bicycle racks on the northwest corner of Ferris Avenue and New Street, which is also the entrance to the station parking lot north of NY 119.

== History ==
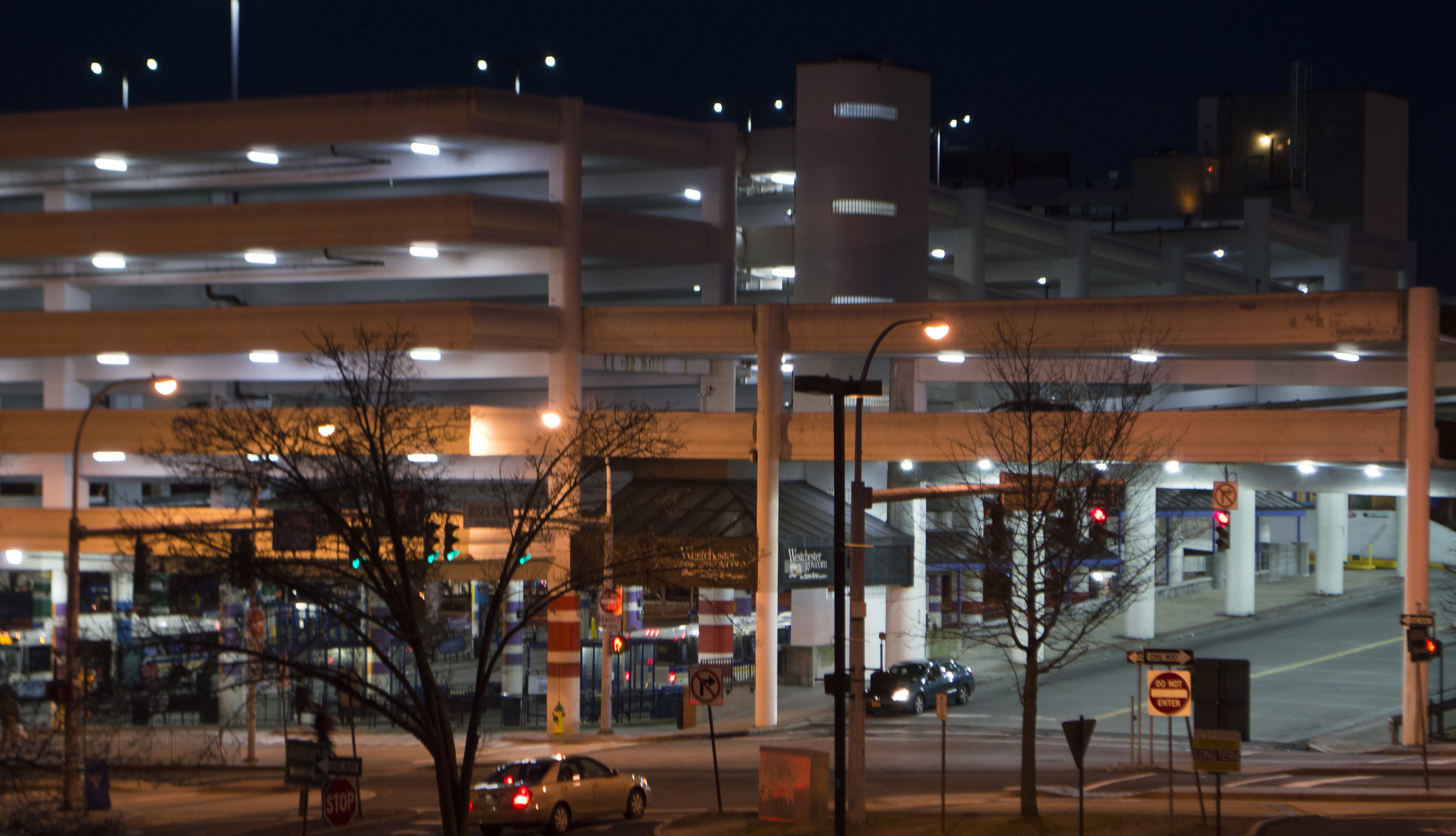
White Plains TransCenter at night

The White Plains Railroad Station has been a major transportation hub from its days as a New York Central and Hudson River Railroad station, with trolley routes such as the New York, Elmsford and White Plains Railroad and the Tarrytown, White Plains and Mamaroneck Railway Company, both of which were acquired by the Westchester Street Railroad Company, an affiliate of the Third Avenue Railway. Throughout the 20th century, trolleys were replaced by buses, many of which were private and localized companies, that were eventually acquired by Bee-LineBus beginning in 1978. It also attracted intercity buses, such as Greyhound, Trailways, Short Line, and other companies. The station was merged with Pennsylvania Railroad transforming it into a Penn Central Railroad station. Buses and trains continued to use the station through the collapse of Penn Central, the acquisition by Conrail and the MTA, the full control by Metro-North Railroad, and the reconstruction of the station during the mid-1980s. The current TransCenter was built shortly after the reconstruction of the aforementioned railroad station.

== Bus list ==
The following bus routes serve the White Plains TransCenter area, in the vicinity of the station.

Route	Stop location	Terminal1	Terminal2	via	notes
Bee-Line Bus
1W	Lane F and Lane C	Riverdale, Bronx; 242nd Street and Broadway at Van Cortlandt Park-242 Street ( 1 train)	White Plains; City Center	Broadway, Warburton Avenue, Tarrytown Road	
3	Lane F and Lane C	Riverdale, Bronx; 242nd Street and Broadway at Van Cortlandt Park-242 Street ( 1 train)	Purchase; The Centre at Purchase at MasterCard headquarters	Broadway, Sprain Brook Parkway, Westchester Avenue	Closed door service south of White Plains.; Express between White Plains and Yonkers.
5	Lane F and Lane C	Yonkers; Getty Square; Riverdale Avenue	Harrison; Oakland Avenue and Halstead Avenue	Nepperhan Avenue, Saw Mill River Road, Tarrytown Road, North Street	No Sunday service between White Plains and Harrison.
6	Lane F and Lane C	Yonkers; Nepperhan Plaza at Yonkers Metro-North Station	Pleasantville; Bedford Road and Wheeler Avenue at Pleasantville Metro-North Station	Broadway, Dobbs Ferry Road, Columbus Avenue	
11	Lane B	Croton-on-Hudson; Croton–Harmon (Metro-North station)	White Plains; Main Street and North Broadway	Central Park Avenue	Limited-stop service. Pickup and dropoff along route.; Weekday rush-hour peak only service operates the full route (to White Plains AM, from White Plains PM). These trips do not serve the Cross County Shopping Center.
12	Lane B	to Armonk; North Castle Town Hall		Westchester Avenue, Purchase Street, Anderson Hill Road, King Street	Weekend service operates only between White Plains and the Westchester County Airport.; Some rush hour trips also serve Reckson Executive Park and Westchester Business Park in Armonk.; A portion of the route between Armonk and Jefferson Valley Mall (original northern terminus) discontinue on February 15, 2010 due to low ridership.
13	Lane F and Lane C	Ossining; Ossining (Metro-North station) and Ferry Terminal	Rye Playland	Midland Avenue, Westchester Avenue, Tarrytown Road, White Plains Road, Broadway	Weekend service ends at Spring Street in Ossining, and does not serve the train station.; Some trips on weekdays and Saturdays are extended to Rye Playland (over the former #76 route). Most service ends at the Port Chester railroad station on Westchester Avenue.
14	Lane B and Lane E	White Plains; City Center	Cortlandt; Town Center	Tarrytown Road, Saw Mill River Road, Albany Post Road, Riverside Avenue, Westchester Avenue, Washington Street, Main Street	Late evening Saturday service from White Plains terminates in Ossining.
15	Lane B and Lane E	White Plains; City Center	Peekskill; Main Street and Nelson Avenue	Knollwood Road, Saw Mill River Road, Crompond Road	No Sunday service.
17	Lane B	Cortlandt Town Center	White Plains; Main Street and North Broadway	New York State Route 9A	Passengers are only carried between one of these locations and Montrose/Peekskill/Cortlandt: Mid-Westchester Executive Park, Cross-Westchester Executive Park, and White Plains central business district.; The first PM departure continues as the last southbound 15 to White Plains.
20	Lanes C and E	Bedford Park, Bronx; Bedford Park Boulevard and Jerome Avenue at Bedford Park Boulevard–Lehman College ( 4 train)	White Plains; City Center	Central Park Avenue	Trips signed as 20X make all stops except the Cross County Shopping Center mall.; All other trips serve Cross County.
21	Lanes C and E	Bedford Park, Bronx; Bedford Park Boulevard and Jerome Avenue at Bedford Park Boulevard–Lehman College ( 4 train)	White Plains; Main Street and North Broadway	Central Park Avenue	Limited-stop service. Pickup and dropoff along route.; Weekday rush-hour peak service operates the full route (to White Plains AM, from White Plains PM). These trips do not serve the Cross County Shopping Center.; Outside peak service, service operates only between the Bronx and the Cross County Shopping Center, via Macy's, making limited stops.
27	Lanes B and E	Hawthorne; Mid-Westchester Executive Park	White Plains; Main Street and North Broadway	Saw Mill River Road	Express from Cross-Westchester Executive Park to Westchester County Center.; Passengers carried to and from White Plains only.; Second AM trip continues non-stop to Peekskill.
40	Lane B	Wakefield, Bronx; 241st Street and White Plains Road at Wakefield-241 Street ( 2 train)	Westchester Medical Ctr	White Plain Road/ Post Road	Mostly ends at Mount Vernon.; Open door Bronx
41	Lane E	Wakefield, Bronx; 241st street and White Plains Road at Wakefield-241 Street ( 2 train)	Westchester Medical ctr	White Plain Road/ Post Road	Limited Stop Service for Route 40 .; Open-door in the Bronx.
60	Lane B	to Fordham Plaza Bus Terminal at East 189th Street and Third Avenue (southbound) or Fordham Road and Third Avenue (northbound)		Boston Road, Palmer Avenue, Mamaroneck Avenue	Open-door in the Bronx along Boston Road. Local passengers are not carried along Fordham Road.; Original terminus was Valentine Avenue & East Fordham Road
62	Lane B	to Fordham, Bronx (at Tiebout Avenue and Fordham Road near Fordham Road ( B D trains)		Boston Post Road, New England Thruway, Westchester Avenue	Express to the Bronx
63	Lane B	to Scarsdale Railroad Station; East side		Old Mamaroneck Road; Palmer Avenue; Crossway; Popham Road	No Sunday service.; One rush hour round trip serves Brook Street and Garth Road instead of Popham Road in Scarsdale.; Weekday evening trips from Scarsdale terminate at The Heathcote School, via Crossway.; Some weekday and all Saturday trips bypass Crossway.
77	Lanes B and C	Carmel; Putnam Plaza	White Plains; Main Street and North Broadway	US 6, NY 132, Taconic State Parkway, Sprain Brook Parkway, I-287,	Express from Westchester County Center to FDR State Park Park-Ride.; Passengers carried to and from White Plains only.
A	Lane A	to White Plains; Platinum Mile		Westchester Avenue	
B	Lane A	to White Plains; Platinum Mile		Westchester Avenue	
C	Lane A	to Port Chester; Rye Ridge Shopping Center; Westchester Avenue		Cross-Westchester Expressway	
D	Lane A	to White Plains; Platinum Mile		Westchester Avenue	
F	Lane A	to Tarrytown; Tarrytown Corporate Center; Taxter Road		I-287, NY 119	
H	Lane A	to Armonk; IBM; Riverdale Avenue		Lake Street, King Street	
CT Transit (Stamford)
I-Bus (971)	Lane C	I-Bus to Stamford		I-287, I-95	Connects to NTD Wheels Greenwich Central, West Loop, and Route 11 at Greenwich RR Station.
Transport of Rockland
Hudson Link	Lane E	Hudson Link to Spring Valley and Palisade Ctr		I-287, I-87	
Short Line Bus
287/OWL	Lane E	Monticello	White Plains Platinum Mile	I-87, I-287	
495	Lane E	Monticello	Patchogue	I-87, I-287, I-495	
Leprechaun Lines
TLC	Lanes C and E	Poughkeepsie	White Plains Platinum Mile	US 9, NY 9A, NY 119, I-287	
Greyhound Lines
GREY		New York City	Boston	I-287, I-95, I-91, I-84, Massachusetts Turnpike	
Trailways of New York
TNY		Albany	Babylon	I-87, I-287, I-495, NY 24, NY 109, NY 27	
