= White Plains station =

Metro-North Railroad station in New York

White Plains
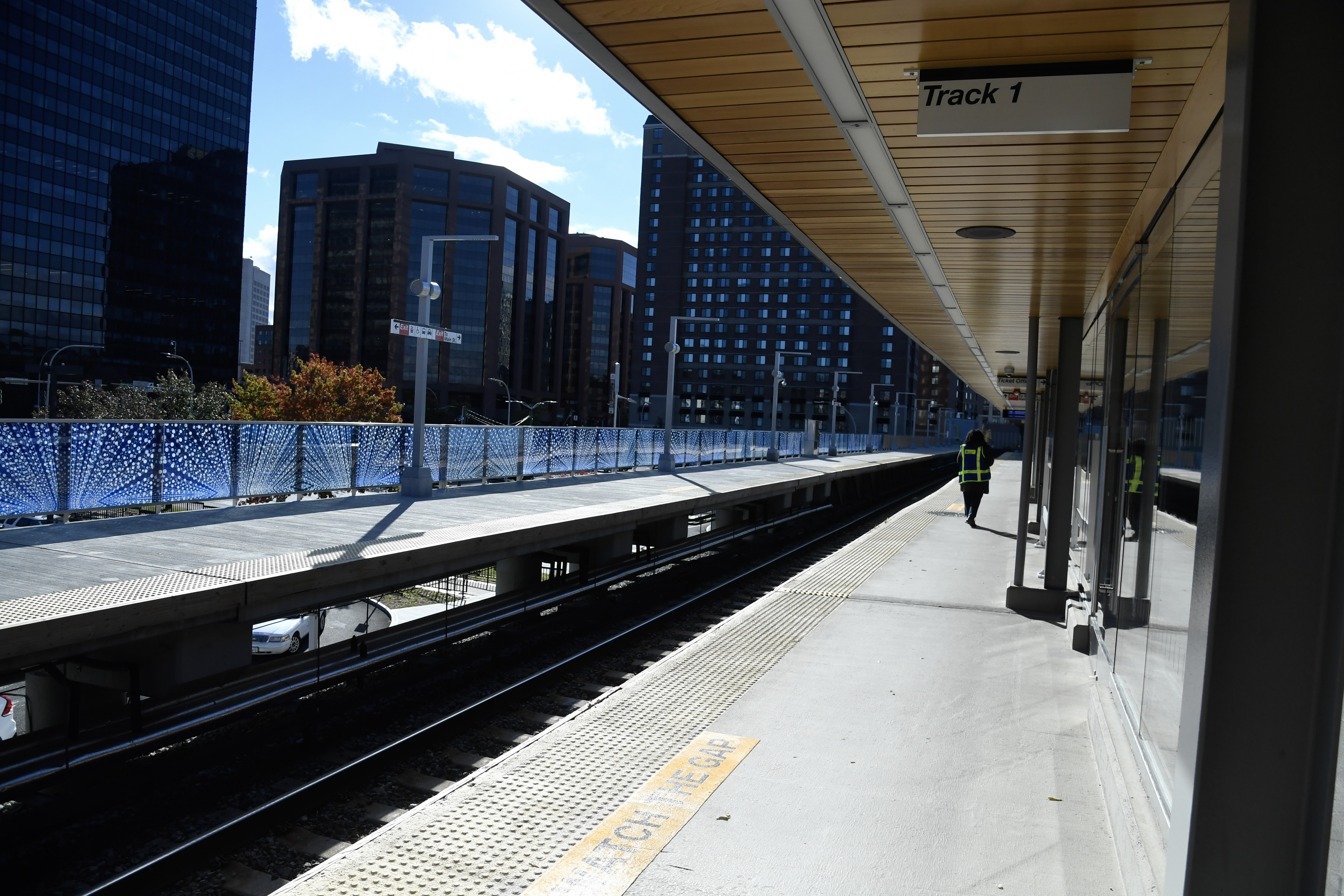
- View of White Plains station from platform

General information
- Location: 16 Ferris Avenue, White Plains, New York
- Coordinates: 41.0338°N 73.7747°W
- Platforms: 1 island platform 1 side platform
- Tracks: 2
- Connections: White Plains TransCenter

Construction
- Parking: 1,226 spaces
- Accessible: yes

Other information
- Fare zone: 4

History
- Opened: December 1, 1844
- Rebuilt: December 1914 (New York Central Railroad); 1987 (Metro-North Railroad)
- Electrified: 700V (DC) third rail

Passengers
- 2018: 11,550 (Metro-North)
- Rank: 2 of 109

Services
Preceding station	Metro-North Railroad	Following station
Hartsdale toward Grand Central	Harlem Line	North White Plains Terminus
Harlem–125th Street toward Grand Central	Harlem Line	North White Plains toward Southeast or Wassaic

Former services
Preceding station	New York Central Railroad	Following station
Hartsdale toward New York	Harlem Division	North White Plains toward Chatham
Location

White Plains station is a commuter rail stop on the Metro-North Railroad's Harlem Line, located in White Plains, New York. With 9,166 daily commuters as of 2006, White Plains is the busiest Metro-North station in Westchester County, the busiest non-terminal or transfer station on the Metro-North system, and the first/last stop outside New York City on most upper Harlem Line express trains.

Though it is not a terminal station, White Plains is one of the key stations on the Harlem Line. Its downtown White Plains location is not far from many businesses and office buildings making it very convenient to commuters and making it a stop for all off-peak trains and most peak trains regardless of terminal location. A short walk from the station is the White Plains TransCenter, a terminal/transfer point for many Bee-Line buses as well as intercity buses (Greyhound Lines, Leprechaun Lines, Short Line Bus, and Trailways of New York) and Connecticut Transit's I-Bus to Stamford, Connecticut.

Pace University's Graduate Center is located across the street from the White Plains station, while Pace Law School's 12-acre (49,000 m^{2}) campus lies several blocks away on North Broadway. Mercy University, Berkeley College, as well as The College of Westchester are also located within walking distance of the station. The Westchester campus of Fordham University, approximately 4 miles (6.4 km) away, is served by the station.

== History ==
Rail service in White Plains can be traced as far back as December 1, 1844 with the establishment of the New York and Harlem Railroad, which became part of the New York Central and Hudson River Railroad in 1864 and was eventually taken over by the New York Central Railroad. As an NYC station, it originally served both commuter trains in the New York Tri-State Area and long distance trains toward Albany, New York and Boston, Massachusetts, via Chatham, New York. As with most of the Harlem Line, the merger of New York Central with Pennsylvania Railroad in 1968 transformed the station into a Penn Central Railroad station. Penn Central's continuous financial despair throughout the 1970s forced them to turn over their commuter service to the Metropolitan Transportation Authority which made it part of Metro-North in 1983.

The current station house was built in 1987 as a replacement for the previous Warren & Wetmore-built depot originally built in 1914 for the NYC, razed in September 1983. The former was similar to that of the current Poughkeepsie station on the Hudson Line, and continued to operate through the reconstruction.

Under the 2015–2019 Metropolitan Transportation Authority Capital Plan, the station, along with four other Metro-North Railroad stations, would receive a complete overhaul as part of the Enhanced Station Initiative. Updates would include cellular service, Wi-Fi, USB charging stations, interactive service advisories, and maps. The renovations at White Plains station will cost $91.3 million and will be completed by the end of March 2021. The three-phase renovation will improve the exterior, interior, platforms, restrooms, and bridges, and thus, costs much more than the renovations at the four other Metro-North stations.

== Station layout ==
The station has two high-level platforms each 10 cars long. The eastern platform is a side platform used only to discharge passengers.

== Bibliography ==
- Dunbar, Seymour (1915). A History of Travel in America: Being an Outline of the Development in Modes of Travel from Archaic Vehicles of Colonial Times to the Completion of the First Transcontinental Railroad: the Influence of the Indians on the Free Movement and Territorial Unity of the White Race: the Part Played by Travel Methods in the Economic Conquest of the Continent: and Those Related Human Experiences, Changing Social Conditions and Governmental Attitudes which Accompanied the Growth of a National Travel System · Volume 3. Indianapolis, Indiana: Bobbs-Merrill Company.
