= Tom Nussbaum =

Artist

- Born: August 12, 1953 (age 73); Philadelphia, Pennsylvania
- Known for: Sculpture, Drawings, Paper cuts, Prints, Children’s books, Animation, Public art

Tom Nussbaum (born August 12, 1953, in Philadelphia, Pennsylvania) is an American artist known for a variety of work including sculpture, drawings, paper cuts, prints, children’s books, animations, functional design objects, public art, and site-specific commissions. He maintains a studio at Manufacturer's Village in East Orange NJ and Burlington Flats NY.

== Early life and career ==
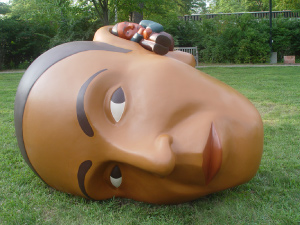
'Listen', by Tom Nussbaum in 2007, 48 x 72 x 60", in the permanent collection of the Montclair Art Museum, Montclair NJ.

Nussbaum was raised in Minneapolis, where he studied at the University of Minnesota. In 1980 he moved to New York City where he worked as a studio assistant to the artists Mimi Gross, Red Grooms and Suzan Pitt. In 1982 he started making art full-time.

Nussbaum's work has been exhibited at numerous galleries including the Phyllis Kind Gallery in New York, NY and Chicago, IL, the Delahunty and Barry Whistler galleries in Dallas, TX, the Robischon Gallery in Denver, CO, and the Metaphor Gallery in Brooklyn, NY.

His sculpture has been included in museum exhibitions at the Minneapolis Institute of Arts, Minneapolis, MN, the Laforet Museum, Tokyo, Japan, the Nicolayson Art Museum Casper, WY, the Montclair Art Museum, Montclair, NJ, the Hunterdon Museum of Art, Clinton, NJ, the Anchorage Museum of History and Art, Anchorage, Alaska, The Contemporary Austin (Laguna Gloria Art Museum), Austin, Texas and the Wright Museum of Art, Beloit, Wisconsin. In 2003 the Montclair Art Museum commissioned Nussbaum to create "Home Sweet Home", a site-specific mural of abstracted geometric and folkloric motifs. Home Sweet Home was accompanied by a display of twenty of the artist's enigmatic, allegorical figures.

Nussbaum is also known for his design objects. In 1985 he began The Acme Robot Company, producing night-lights and light figures of his design. In 1988 he founded Atomic Iron Works, designing and producing iron hat and coat racks and other useful items, sold in museum shops such as The Whitney Museum of American Art, NY, NY, The Dallas Museum of Art, Dallas, TX and The Museum of Contemporary Art, Los Angeles. In 1992,New Jersey Transit Children's Universe/Rizzoli published his activity book, My World is Not Flat."

In 2025 Montclair Art Museum presented a comprehensive survey of Nussbaum's work in an exhibition called "Tom Nussbaum: But Wait, There's More!" on display from September 13, 2025, to January 4, 2026.

== Public Art Installations ==
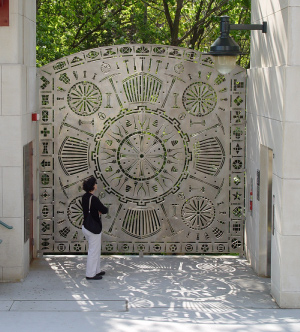
'Train Time' by Tom Nussbaum, NJTransit Bay Street Station, Montclair, NJ. Stainless steel. 2002.

Tom Nussbaum has completed over 35 public art installations. In 1987 Nussbaum created a 10' x 72' 3D mural commissioned by the Hasbro Toy Company. In 1992, Nussbaum began creating public arts projects with a commission from the Metropolitan Transit Authority, Metro North Railroad, at the Scarsdale and Hartsdale stations Westchester County, NY. Since then, he has completed numerous public art works and private commissions, including projects for five stations, the New York City Public Schools, the Princeton Library, the Wildwoods NJ Convention Center, the All Children's Playground, Edgemont Memorial Park Montclair, NJ and the College of New Jersey.

Nussbaum has been commissioned by a number of hospitals including, the Mayo Clinic (2013) Rochester, MN, Johns Hopkins Hospital Charlotte Bloomberg Children's Center (2012) Baltimore, MD, Memorial Sloan-Kettering Cancer Center (1996) NY, NY and the St. Lukes Roosevelt Hospital (1995) NY, NY.

In 2013, Nussbaum completed the Albert E. Hinds Memorial Gateways in the center of Princeton, NJ. These stainless steel gateways incorporate images from the history of American quilts, and commemorate the life of Albert E. Hinds, and the history of the African-American experience in Princeton.

== Awards ==
The NJ State Council on the Arts awarded Nussbaum an Individual Artist Fellowship in 2001 and in 2009. He was a 2008 fellow at the Virginia Center for the Creative Arts and was a MacDowell Colony fellow in 2005, 2006, and 2007.

== Gallery ==
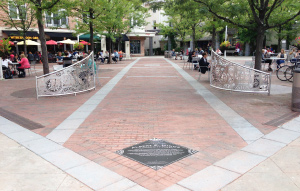
Albert E. Hinds memorial gateway. Princeton, NJ. Stainless steel. 2013

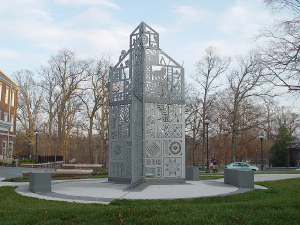
Building Up. The College of New Jersey, Ewing, NJ. Anodized aluminum. 2012

== Bibliography ==
- Accola, Kristen. "Tom Nussbaum New Work: Sculpture, Paper Cutouts, Drawings" The Hunterdon Museum of Art Nov. 5, 2006
- Ames, Lynne. “Critics on the Run: Commuters Appraise a New Art Project.” The New York Times, Sunday 11 Aug. 1991, WC.: 2.
- Ayres, William and Sandra Bloodworth. Art En Route. Metropolitan Transportation Authority: 1994.: 20.
- Berwick, Carly. “Reviews: Ron Cohen, Nancy Grimes, Donata Mancini, and Tom Nussbaum.” Art News May, 2004: 158.
- Bischoff, Dan. “A Feel for Folk Art.” The Star Ledger 18 Dec. 1998, Art.: 4.
- Bischoff, Dan. “Art Museum Offers Two Shows.” The Star Ledger 22 May 1998, Art.: 25–26.
- Bischoff, Dan. “Art Project Has Great Track Record.” The Sunday Star Ledger 6 May 2001, Art.: 1, 6–7.
- Bischoff, Dan. "Artists World View of an Unpopular War." The Sunday Star Ledger, Nov. 12, 2006
- Bischoff, Dan. "Art About Artists Making Art" The Star Ledger Sept. 27, 2008
- Bischoff, Dan. “Dynamic Duos.” Sunday Star Ledger 27 June 1999, Art.: 1+
- Bischoff, Dan. “Go Figure: Bodies of Work Focus on Human Form.” The Sunday Star Ledger 25 Nov. 2001, Art.: 2.
- Bischoff, Dan. “Gun Show Right on Target.” The Star Ledger, 23 Feb. 2001, Art.: 43.
- Bischoff, Dan. “Less is More for Sculptor’s Tiny Icons.” The Sunday Star Ledger 29 July 2003, Art.: 1,8.
- Bischoff, Dan. “Seeing Through the Clutter of Modern Art.” Sunday Star Ledger 20 Sept. 1998, Art.: 1+
- Bischoff, Dan. “Wall of Plenty in Montclair: Nussbaum’s Giant Mural Joins his Sculptures at Museum.” The Star Ledger 30 May 2003, Art.: 4.
- Chandler, Mary Voelz. “Sizing up Bodies of Work.” Rocky Mountain News 30 Mar. 2001, Art.
- Chandler, Mary Voelz. “Beasts Come to Life.” Denver Rocky Mountain News 4 June 1999, Art.: 8D.
- Cohrs, Timothy. “Review: Sculpture.” Arts April 1986 Falkenstein, Michelle. “Foot Lights: Art Both Large and Small.” The New York Times, Sunday 8 June 2003, New Jersey.
- Finn, Joan. "Mam's Outdoor Sculpture: A Community Experience" The Montclair Times, July 11, 2013
- Gilfillian, Trudi. "Wildwood Culture Inspires Artist" The Press of Atlantic City, July 21, 2011
- Johnson, Ken. “New Jersey Tour: Napalm, African Shields and Surreal Trees.” The New York Times 25 July 2003, Weekend.: E31.
- “Journal of the American Veterinary Medical Association.” About the Cover 7 (2003): 914.
- Koutsky, Linda. “Tom Nussbaum Window Art.” Skyway News 10-16 Feb. 2003, 11.
- Kutner, Janet. “Folk Art With the Fire of Life.” The Dallas Morning News 15 Dec. 1990, Today.: 1+
- Ludas, Elizabeth. “Nussbaum Large and Small.” The Montclair Times 5 June 2003, Community.: 1.
- MacMillan, Kyle. “Fine Sampling of Art on Exhibit.” The Denver Post 6 April 2001, Art.
- MacMillan, Kyle. “’Solace’ in Art.” The Denver Post 2002, The Scene
- Marchetti, Tony. "First Class" TCNJ Magazine, Sept. 2012
- McCabe, Brett. “Looking Awry.” The Met 15 Dec. 1999, Arts.: 28.
- Mesnik, Sondra. “Sculptor’s Work is in Café at Neiman Marcus.” Scottsdale Progress 12 Aug. 1993, Scottsdale Life.:10.
- Mitchell, Charles Dee. “The Quiet Ones.” Dallas Observer 15 Dec.1988 Arts.: 8.
- Moctezuma, Steven. “MAM Fine Arts Annual Amazes the Imagination.” The Montclair Times 23 July 1998, 1+
- Paglia, Michael. “The Shock of the New.” Westword 10–16 June 1999, Art.: 60.
- Polan, Corky. "Best Bits: The King of Parts", New York Magazine, 22 Sep 1986
- Rees, Christina. “All’s Well That Ends Well.” Dallas Oberserver 23-29 Dec. 1999, Art.: 85+
- Sims, Patterson. "Tom Nussbaum Home Sweet Home and Twenty Small Sculptures" The Montclair Art Museum. Sept. 2003
- Silberman, Ellen. “Metro North Bringing Art to Local Commuters.” The Scarsdale Inquirer 23 Feb. 1990: 1.
- Thorbourne, Ken. “A Year After the ‘Summit,’ Montclair Sees Some Art Gains.” The Montclair Times 27 Feb. 2003, News.: A10.
- Thorbourne, Ken. “’Public Art’ Contestants Ready to Hit the Deck.” The Montclair Times 6 Feb. 2003, News.: A6.
- Van Dongen, Susan. “Surrogate Portraits.” The Princeton Packet 21 Dec. 2001, Art,: 6.
- Zimmer, William. "Professionals and Students, Learning From Each Other." The New York Times, Sunday 4 July 1999, New Jersey.: 10.
- Zimmermann PHD, Peter. "Minting the Unconscious; Tom Nussbaum's New Work." The Montclair Times March 15, 2007
