= ArtWorks, the Naomi Cohain Foundation =

ArtWorks, the Naomi Cohain Foundation is a nonprofit established in 2001 in Englewood, New Jersey, to provide art therapy for children who are hospitalized with life-threatening or chronic illnesses. It was founded by Daniela Mendelsohn in honor of her cousin, Naomi Cohain, who came to New Jersey from Israel for cancer treatment, used art to help her cope with her illness, and died in 1995 when she was fifteen years old. It received its nonprofit status from the IRS in 2002.

It costs the organization about $5,000 per year to provide art materials to a hospital. ArtWorks displays the children's work at annual events at museums including Montclair Art Museum.

Michael B. Harris, a doctor who helped arranged for Cohain to be treated in New Jersey and managed her treatment, was a founding director of the organization. Mo Koyfman served as a board member.
