= Stuart Kaufman =

American artist and illustrator (1926–2008)

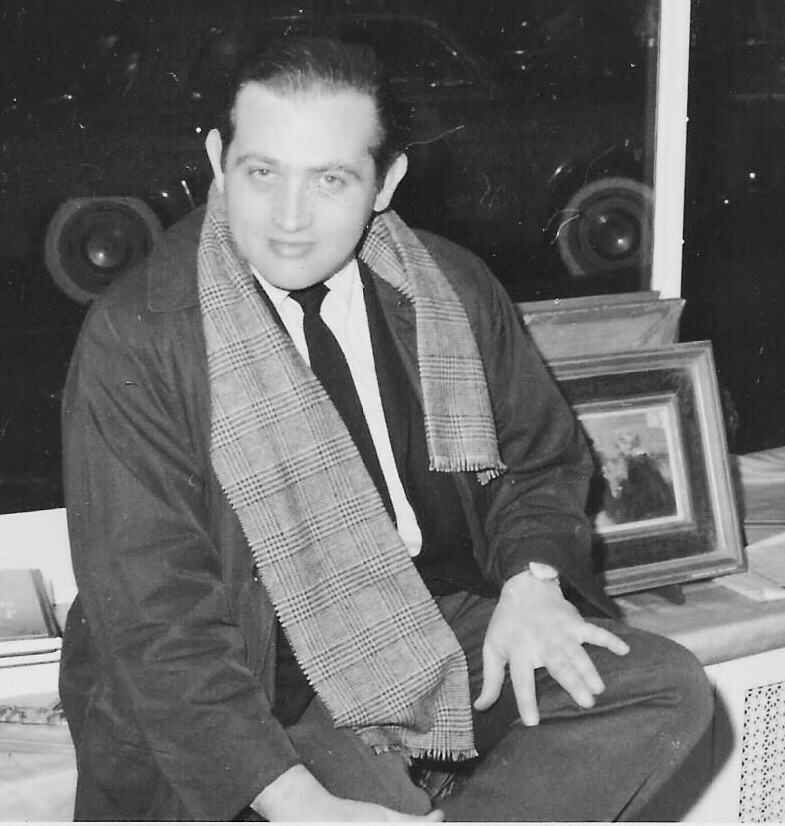
Stuart Kaufman (c. 1965), sitting inside then Gallery 52, South Orange, New Jersey.

Stuart Kaufman (December 1, 1926 – May 11, 2008) was an American artist and illustrator. Kaufman was born in Brooklyn, New York, and attended the Pratt Institute and the Art Students League. His illustrations have been used for book covers, movie posters, and in magazines including The Saturday Evening Post, McCall’s Magazine, Good Housekeeping, Esquire, Ladies' Home Journal, Redbook, and many others.

Kaufman's work has been the subject of exhibitions throughout the United States and has earned him the Guri Seaver Memorial Prize from the Art Institute of Chicago, the George R. Beach Prize from the Montclair Museum, the Montclair Museum of Art Award for Traditional Oils, and the Society of Illustrators Award.
