= Carol Brooks MacNeil =

American sculptor (1871–1944)

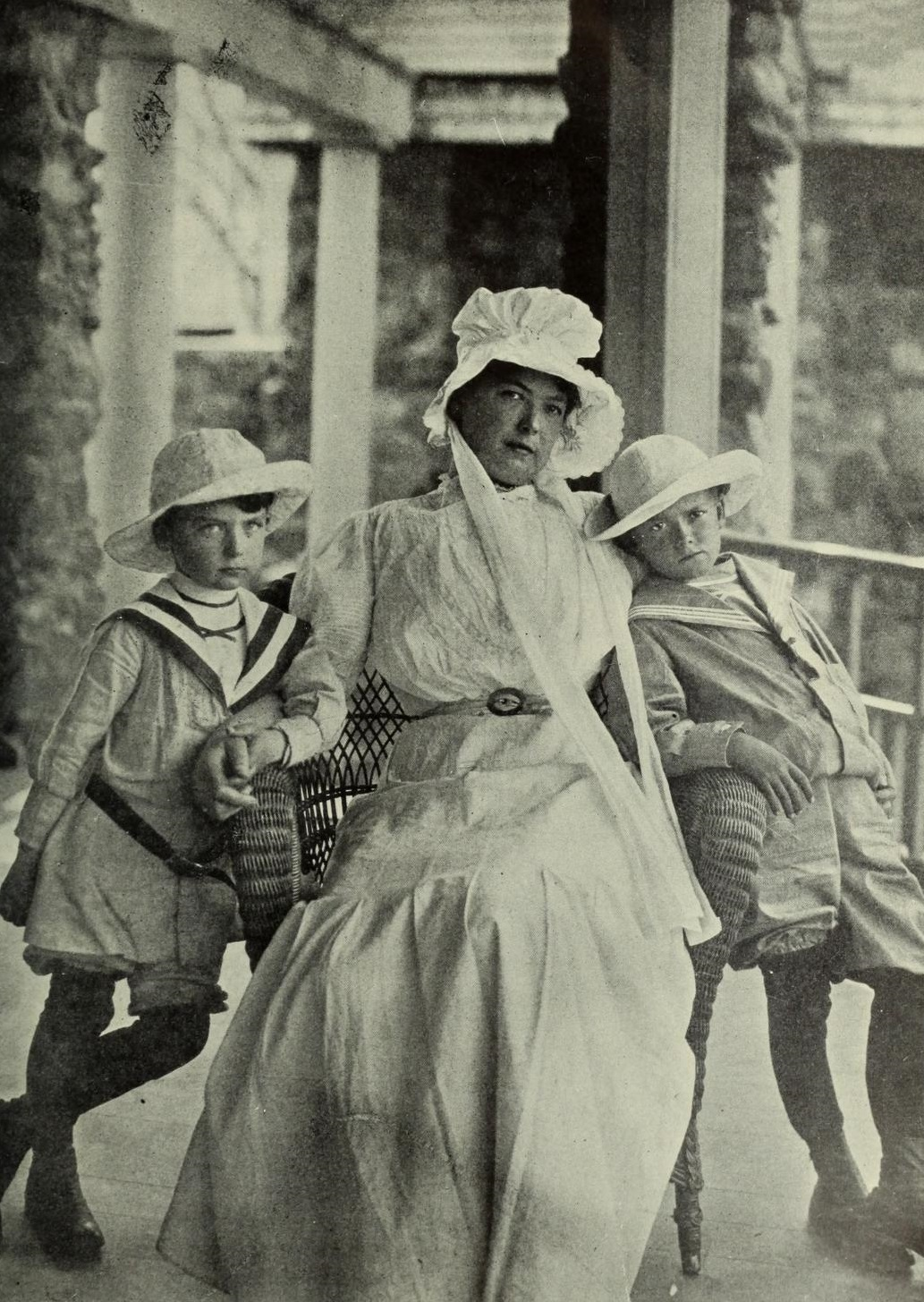
- Mrs. Carol Brooks MacNeil and her two sons
- Born: 1871; Chicago, Illinois
- Died: 1944 (aged 72–73)
- Education: Art Institute of Chicago
- Known for: Sculptor
- Movement: "White Rabbits"

Carol Brooks MacNeil (January 15, 1871 – June 22, 1944) was an American sculptor, born in Chicago where she studied at the Art Institute of Chicago under Lorado Taft. MacNeil modeled many charming and unique designs for vases, teapots, inkstands, and other decorative and useful objects, as well as children's busts, including those of her two sons, and statuettes.

== Life ==
The daughter of a painter father, MacNeil chose instead to work in sculpture. MacNeil studied in Paris under Frederick William MacMonnies and Jean Antoine Injalbert. She was one of the "white rabbits" who worked for Lorado Taft at the World Columbian Exposition of 1893, along with other female artists including Helen F. Mears. In 1895, she married Hermon Atkins MacNeil, a sculptor of American Indians and heroic monuments. They had two sons, Claude A. MacNeil and Alden B. MacNeil. MacNeil evidently collaborated with her husband on at least one project, a sculpture of William McKinley in the William McKinley Monument in front of the Ohio Statehouse in Columbus, Ohio, which was dedicated in September 1907.

MacNeil took responsibility in raising her two children which allowed for less time toward her artwork causing her to produce a limited number of artworks after their birth.

MacNeil won an honorable mention at the International Exposition of 1900 and a silver medal in the same year at the Exposition Universelle. In 1904, she was awarded a bronze medal for a fountain at the Louisiana Purchase Exposition, held in St. Louis. She was a member of the National Sculpture Society.

A longtime resident of the College Point neighborhood in Queens, New York, MacNeil died in the borough's Jamaica Hospital.

== Sources ==
- Holden, Jean Stansbury (October 1907). "The Sculptors MacNeil". The World's Work: A History of Our Time. XIV: 9403–9419.
