= Hartsdale station =

Metro-North Railroad station in New York

Hartsdale
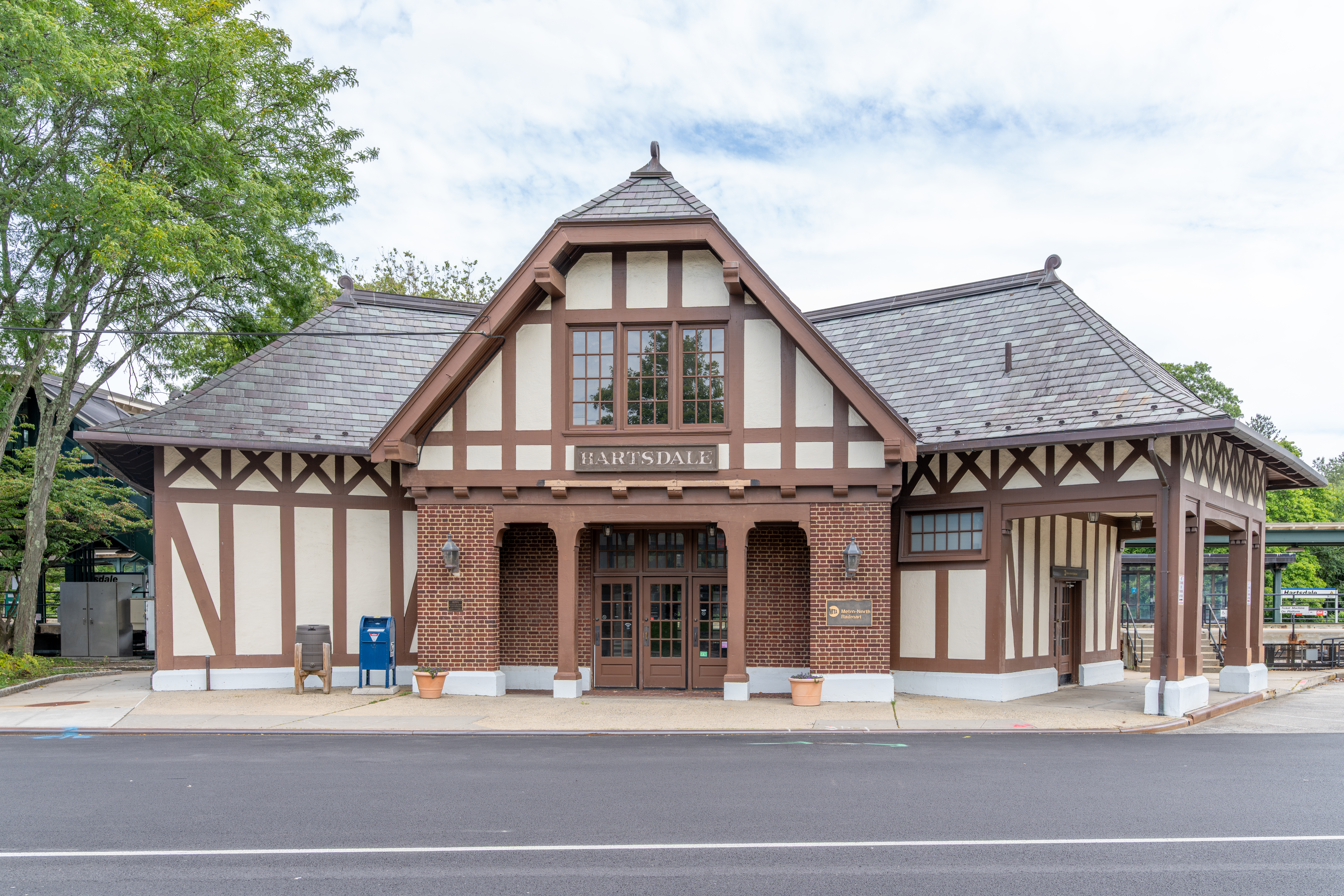
- Hartsdale station as seen from East Hartsdale Avenue

General information
- Location: 1 East Hartsdale Avenue; Hartsdale, New York
- Line: Harlem Line
- Platforms: 2 side platforms
- Tracks: 2
- Connections: Bee-Line Bus System: 34, 38, 39

Construction
- Parking: 797 spaces
- Accessible: yes

Other information
- Fare zone: 4

History
- Opened: December 1, 1844
- Rebuilt: 1915 (NYC)
- Former names: Hart's Corner

Passengers
- 2018: 3,022 (Metro-North)
- Rank: 17 of 109

Services
Preceding station	Metro-North Railroad	Following station
Scarsdale toward Grand Central	Harlem Line	White Plains toward North White Plains

Former services
Preceding station	New York Central Railroad	Following station
Scarsdale toward New York	Harlem Division	White Plains toward Chatham
- Hartsdale Railroad Station
- U.S. National Register of Historic Places
- Location: Hartsdale, New York, USA
- Coordinates: 41°0′40″N 73°47′45″W
- Architect: Warren and Wetmore
- Architectural style: Tudor Revival
- NRHP reference No.: 11000453
- Added to NRHP: July 14, 2011
Location

Hartsdale station is a commuter rail station on the Metro-North Railroad Harlem Line, located in the Hartsdale hamlet of Greenburgh, New York.

== Station layout ==
The station has two slightly offset high-level side platforms, each 12 cars long. The station is the site of Workers, a series of sculptures by Tom Nussbaum portraying silhouettes of railroad workers and commuters. The sculptures are rendered in COR-TEN® steel and placed between the northbound and southbound tracks. Additional monumentally-scaled human figures made of iron are situated in the track bed.

== History ==
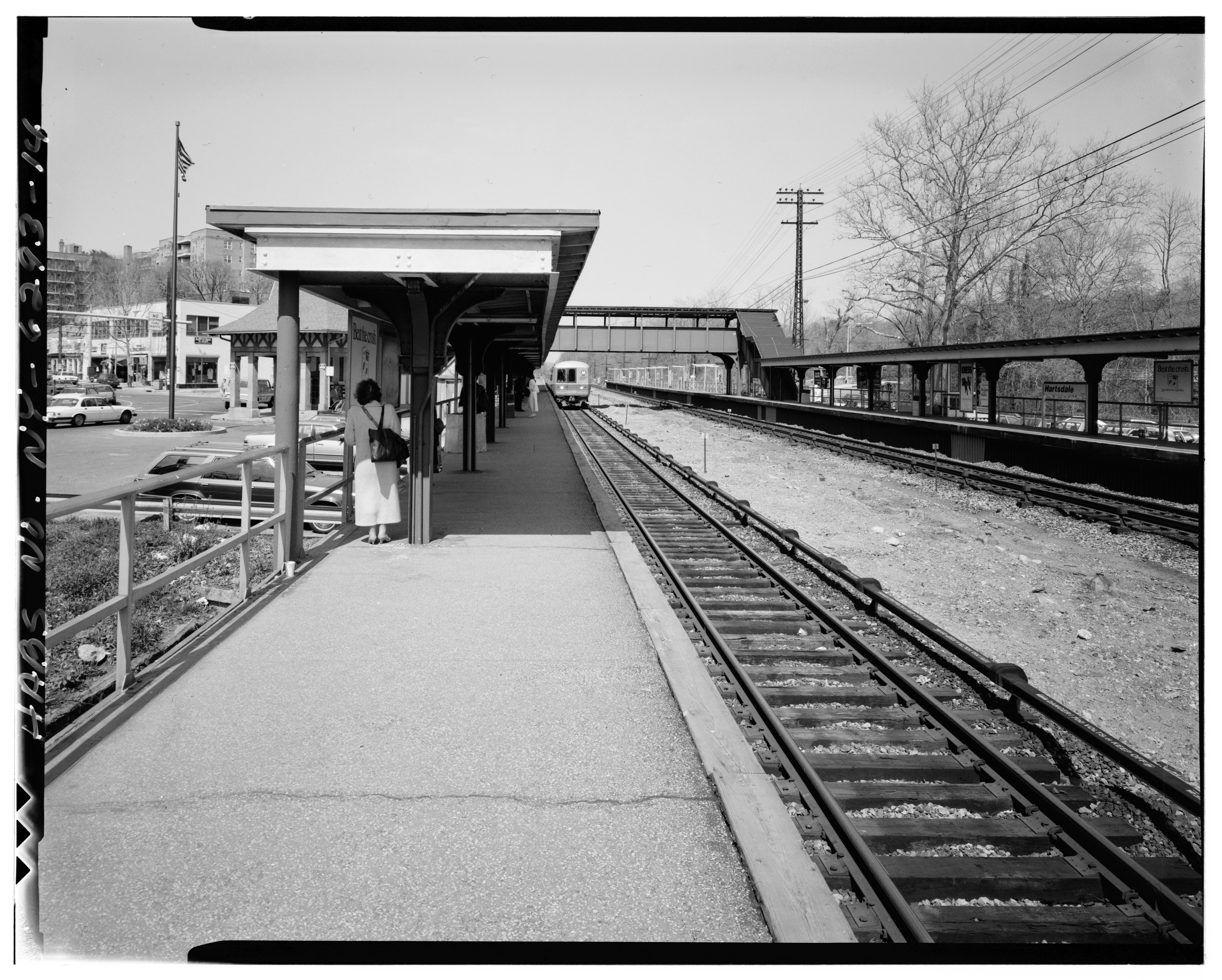
Hartsdale station in 1988

The station building was originally built in 1915 (or 1914 according to the MTA) by the Warren and Wetmore architectural firm for the New York Central Railroad, as a replacement for a smaller wooden depot built by the New York and Harlem Railroad originally known as "Hart's Corner Station." Unlike most Warren & Wetmore-built NYC stations, which were grand cathedral-like structures using Beaux-Arts architecture, the station in particular was strictly of the Tudor Revival style. The station was named after the valley owned by the Harts.

As with most of the Harlem Line, the merger of New York Central with Pennsylvania Railroad in 1968 transformed the station into a Penn Central Railroad station. Penn Central's continuous financial despair throughout the 1970s forced them to turn over their commuter service to the Metropolitan Transportation Authority which made it part of Metro-North in 1983. In 2011, it was listed on the National Register of Historic Places. The station was used in the third season of The Sinner as a stand in for the fictional Dorchester station.

A renovation for accessibility, which added a footbridge with elevators connecting to the existing footbridge, was completed in January 2024.

== See also ==
- National Register of Historic Places listings in southern Westchester County, New York
