= Hermon Atkins MacNeil =

American sculptor (1866–1947)

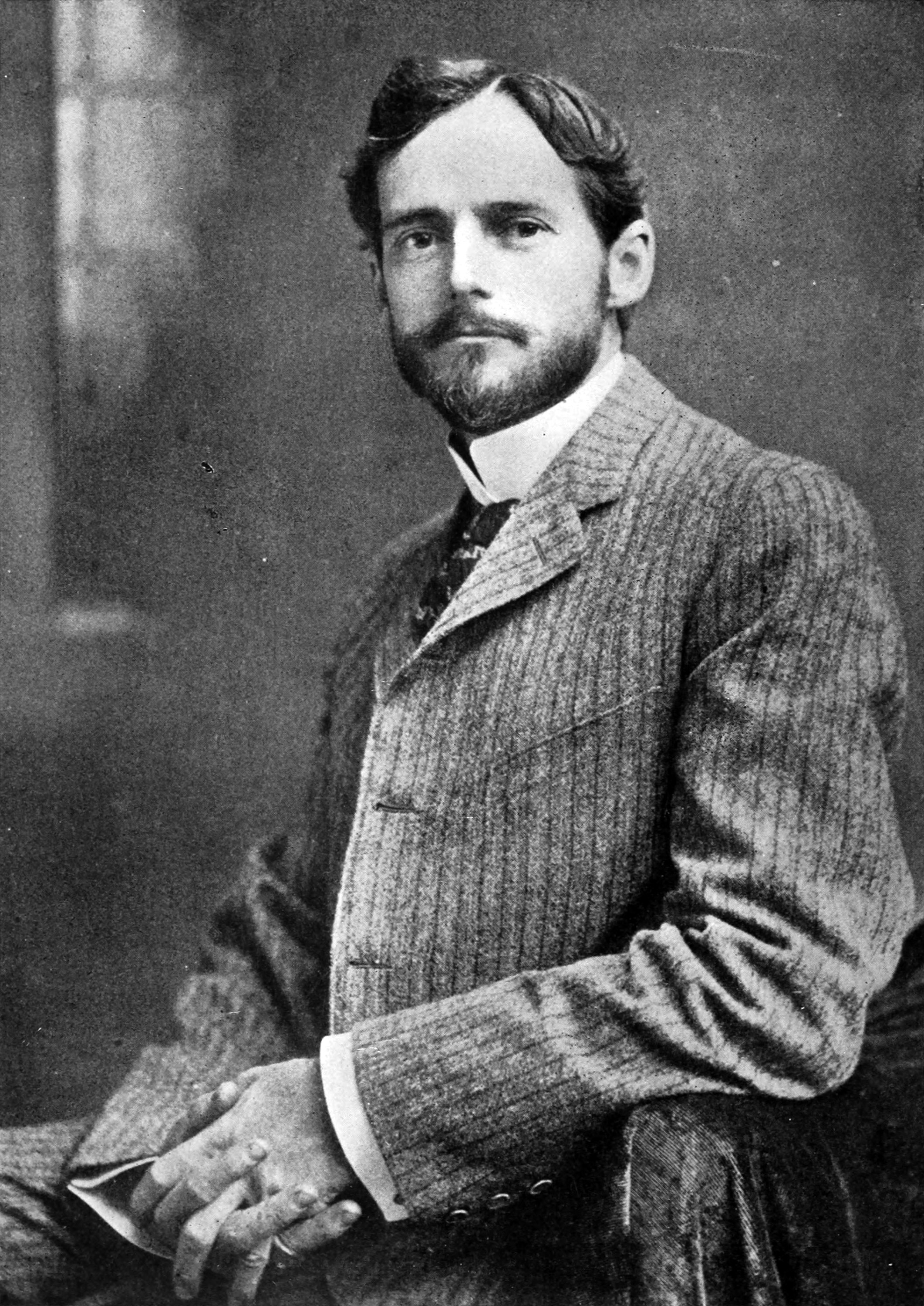
- MacNeil, c. 1907
- Born: February 27, 1866; Everett, Massachusetts, U.S.
- Died: October 2, 1947 (aged 81); Queens, New York City, U.S.
- Resting place: Woodlawn Cemetery; Everett, Massachusetts
- Known for: Sculpture
- Notable work: Standing Liberty Quarter; Justice, the Guardian of Liberty

Hermon Atkins MacNeil (February 27, 1866 – October 2, 1947) was an American sculptor born in Everett, Massachusetts. He is known for designing the Standing Liberty quarter, struck by the Mint from 1916 to 1930; and for sculpting Justice, the Guardian of Liberty on the east pediment of the United States Supreme Court building.

== Career ==
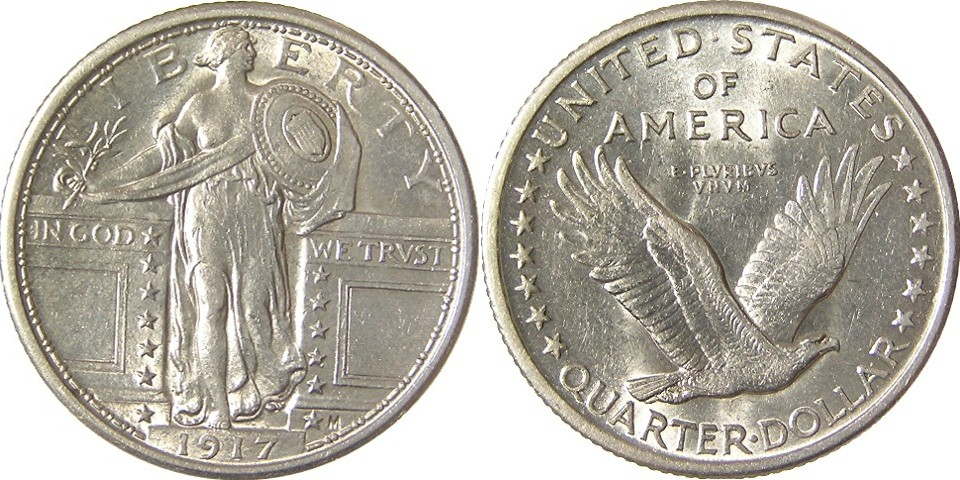
The Standing Liberty Quarter (1916), has the initial of designer Hermon Atkins MacNeil on its obverse, above and to the right of the date.

MacNeil graduated from Massachusetts Normal Art School, now Massachusetts College of Art and Design, in 1886, became an instructor in industrial art at Cornell University from 1886 to 1889, and was then a pupil of Henri M. Chapu and Alexandre Falguière in Paris. Returning to America, he aided Philip Martiny (1858–1927) in the preparation of sketch models for the World's Columbian Exposition, and in 1896 he won the Rinehart scholarship, passing four years (1896–1900) in Rome.

In 1906 he became a National Academician. His first important work was The Moqui Runner, which was followed by A Primitive Chant, and The Sun Vow, all figures of the North American Indian. Several of his earlier American Indian sculptures served as the inspiration for his later contribution to the long running Society of Medalists, Hopi Prayer for Rain. Fountain of Liberty, for the Louisiana Purchase Exposition, and other Indian themes came later; his Agnese and his Beatrice, which are two fine busts of women, and his nude statuettes, which echo his time spent in Rome and Paris, also deserve mention. One of his principal works is the William McKinley Monument sculpture in Columbus, Ohio, in honor of President William McKinley. In 1909 he won in competition a commission for a large soldiers' and sailors' monument in Albany, New York.

Perhaps his best known work is as the designer of the Standing Liberty quarter, which was minted from 1916 to 1930, and carries his initial to the right of the date. He also made Justice, the Guardian of Liberty on the east pediment of the United States Supreme Court building.

MacNeil was one of a dozen sculptors invited to compete in the Pioneer Woman statue competition in 1927, which he failed to win. His work was also part of the art competitions at the 1928 Summer Olympics and the 1932 Summer Olympics.

One of his last works was the Pony Express statue dedicated in 1940 in St. Joseph, Missouri.

== Family ==
His wife, Carol Brooks MacNeil, also a sculptor of distinction, was a pupil of Frederick William MacMonnies and a member of the White Rabbits.

== Gallery ==
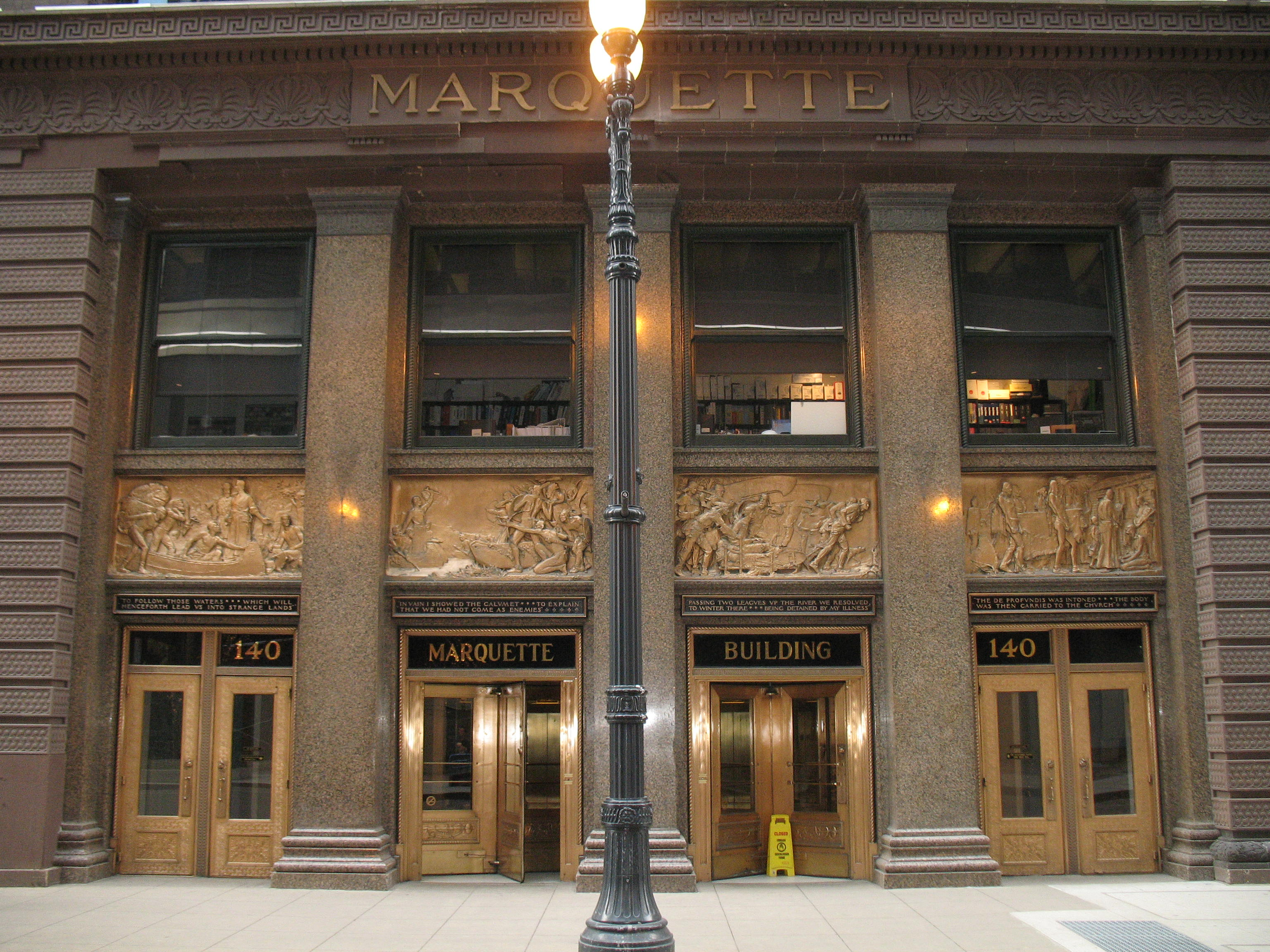
Jacques Marquette bas-reliefs (1894), Marquette Building, Chicago, Illinois.

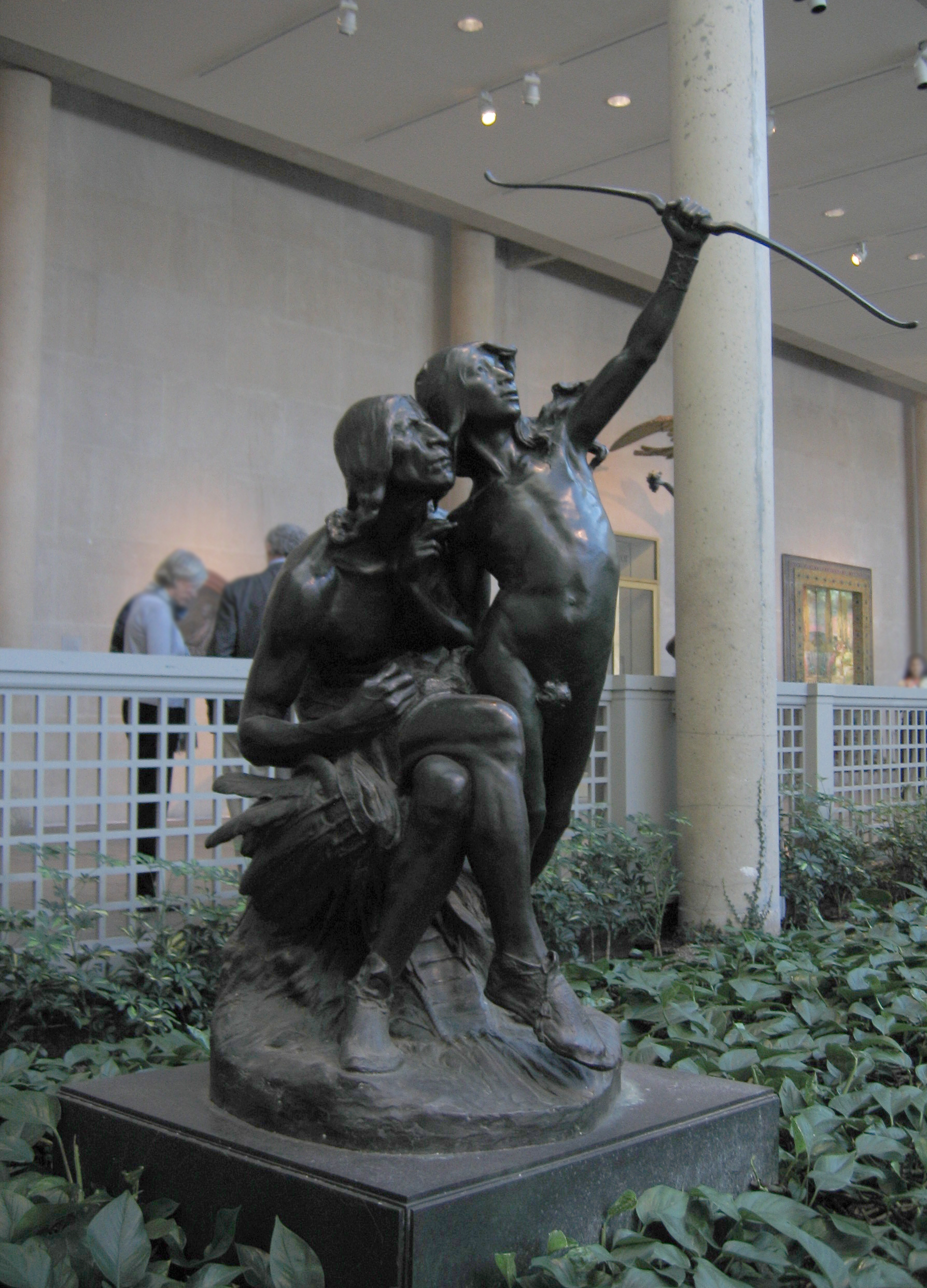
The Sun Vow (1899), bronze, Metropolitan Museum of Art, New York City.

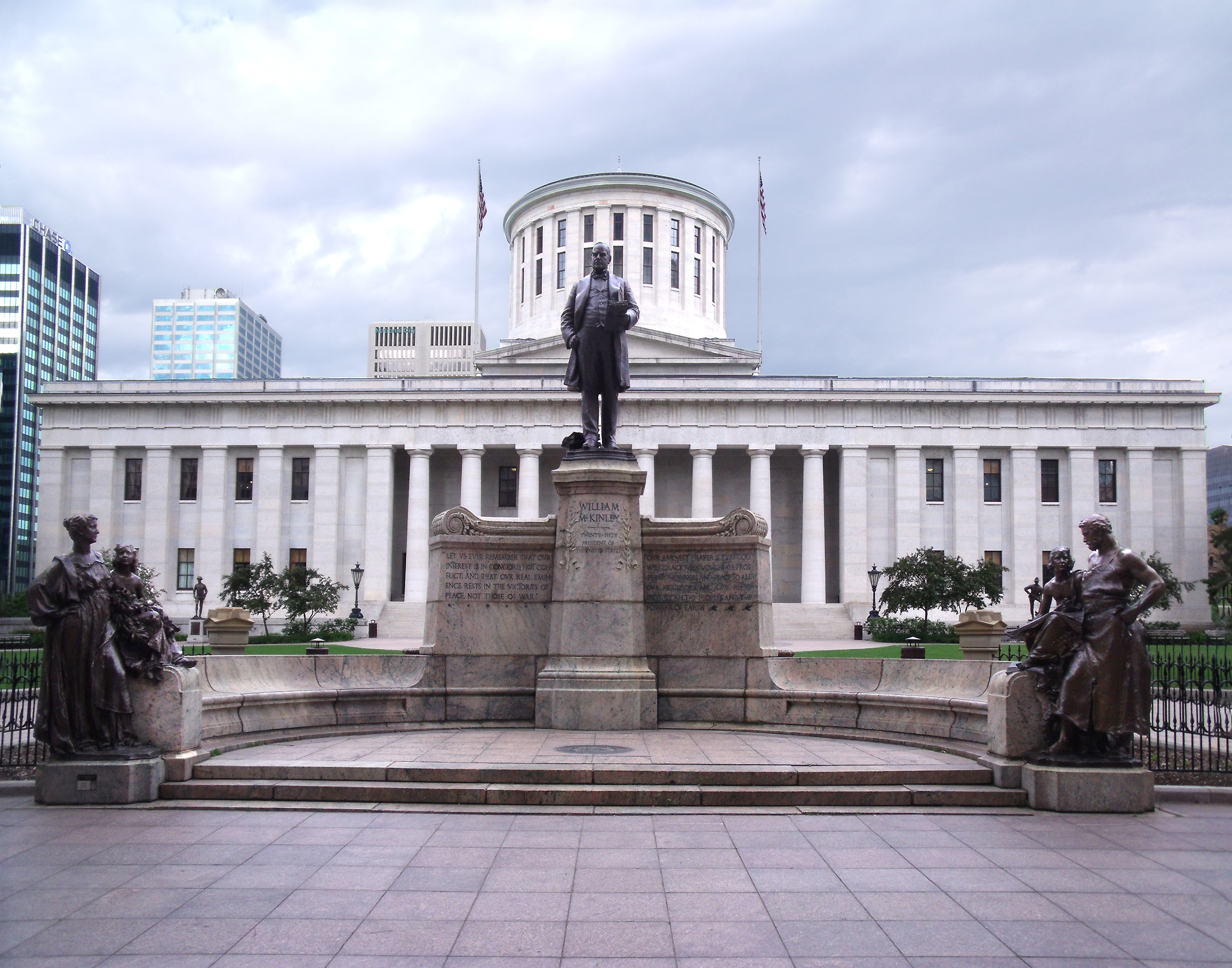
William McKinley Monument (1903–1906), Ohio Statehouse, Columbus, Ohio.

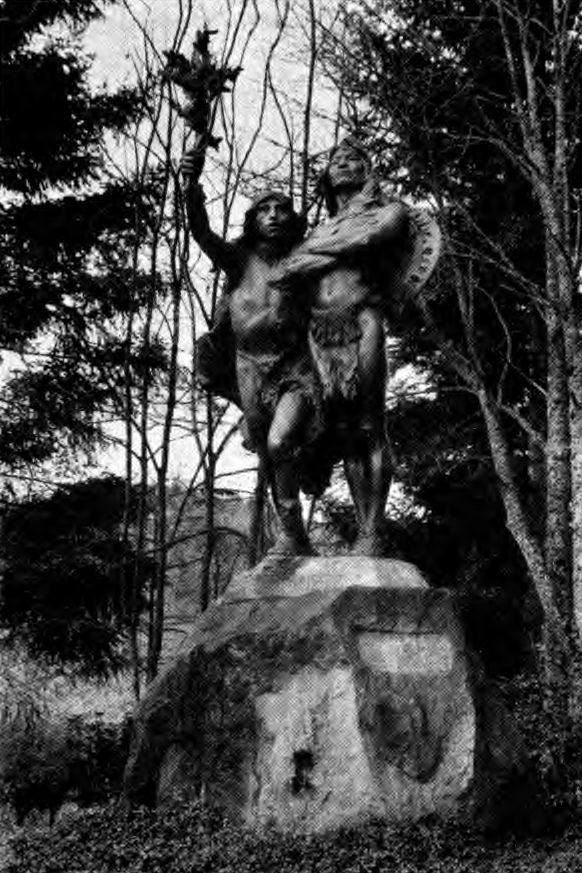
Coming of the White Man (1904), Washington Park, Portland, Oregon. Chief Multnomah observing the Oregon Trail.

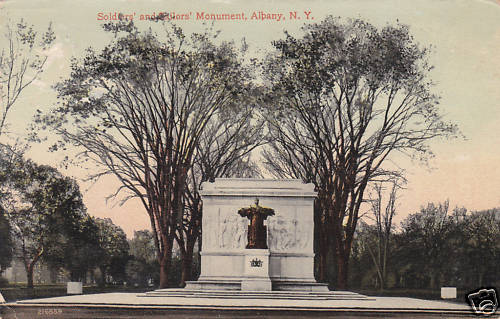
Soldiers' and Sailors' Monument (1909–1912), Washington Park, Albany, New York.

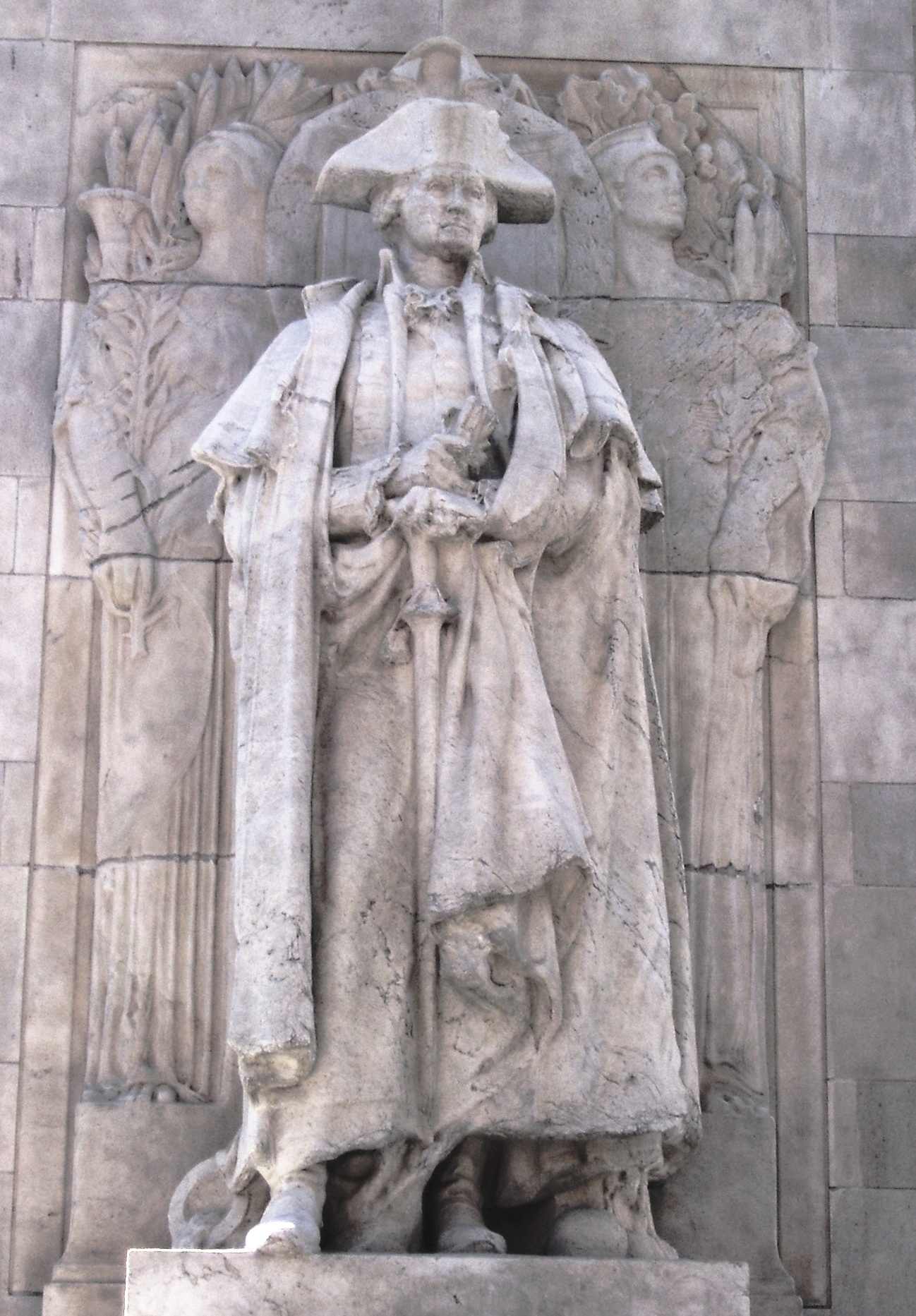
Washington as Commander-in-Chief, Accompanied by Fame and Valor (1914–1916), Washington Square Arch, Washington Square Park, New York City.

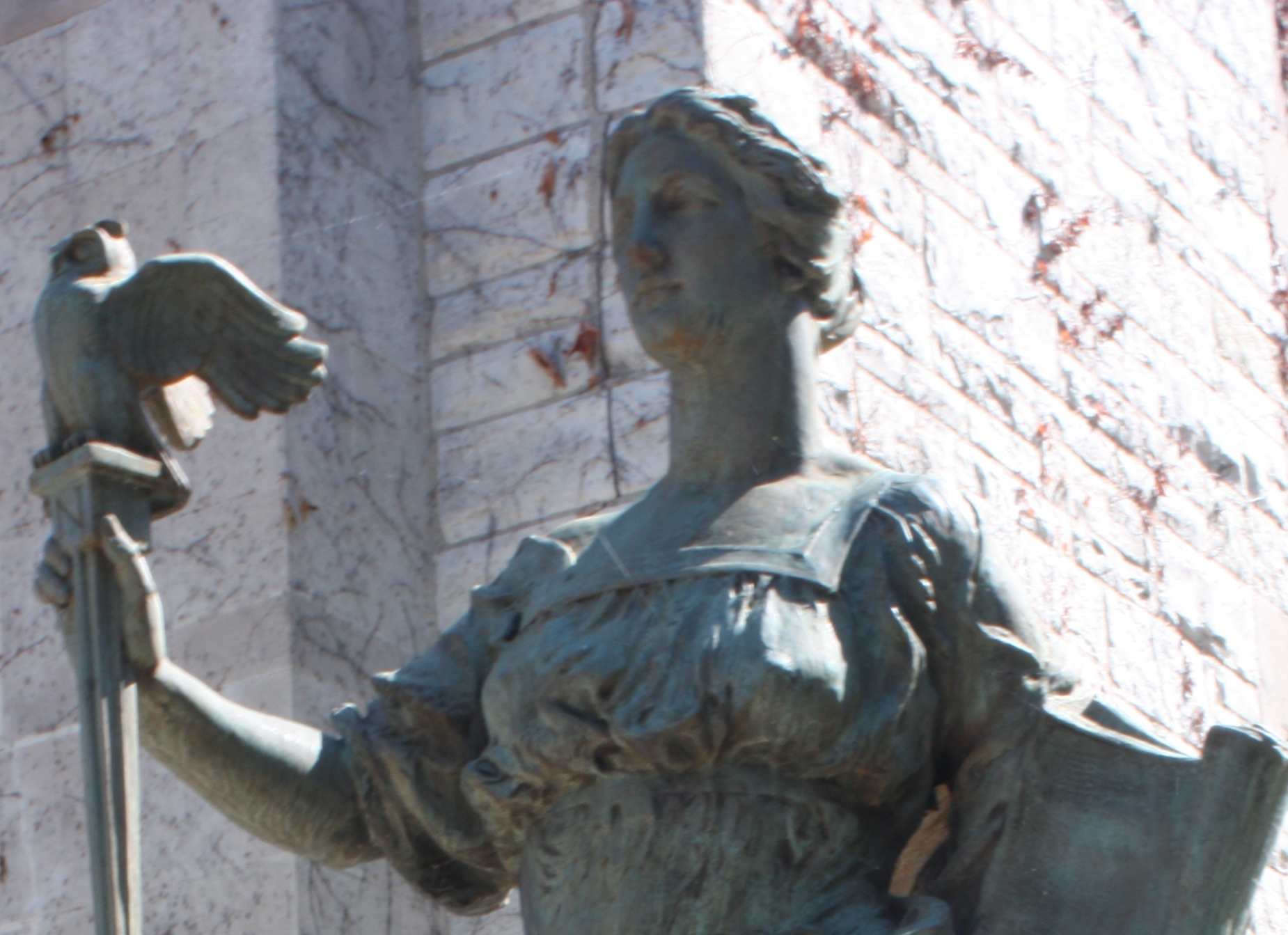
Intellectual Development (1916), Northwestern University, Evanston, Illinois.

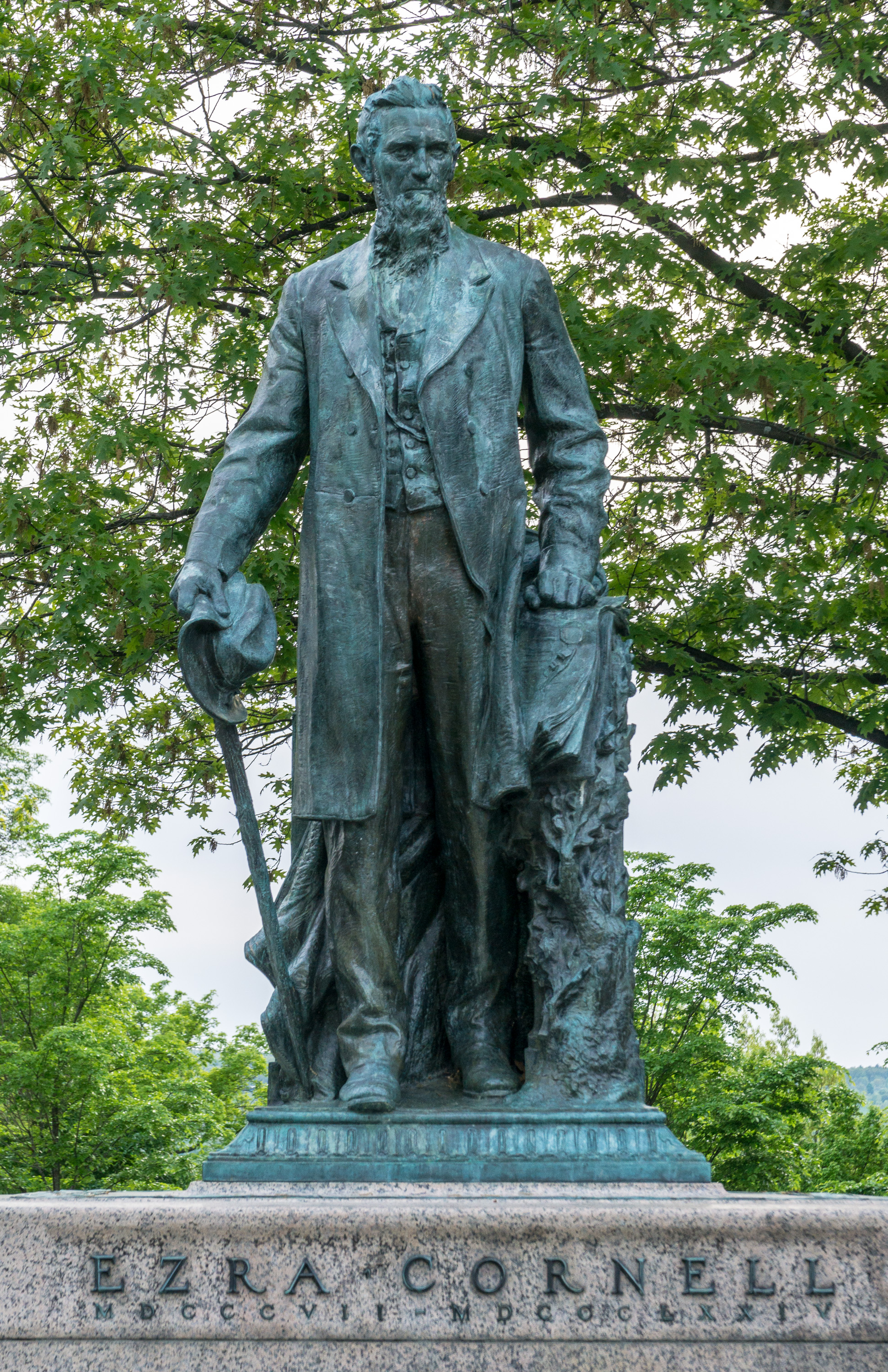
Statue of Ezra Cornell (1919), campus of Cornell University

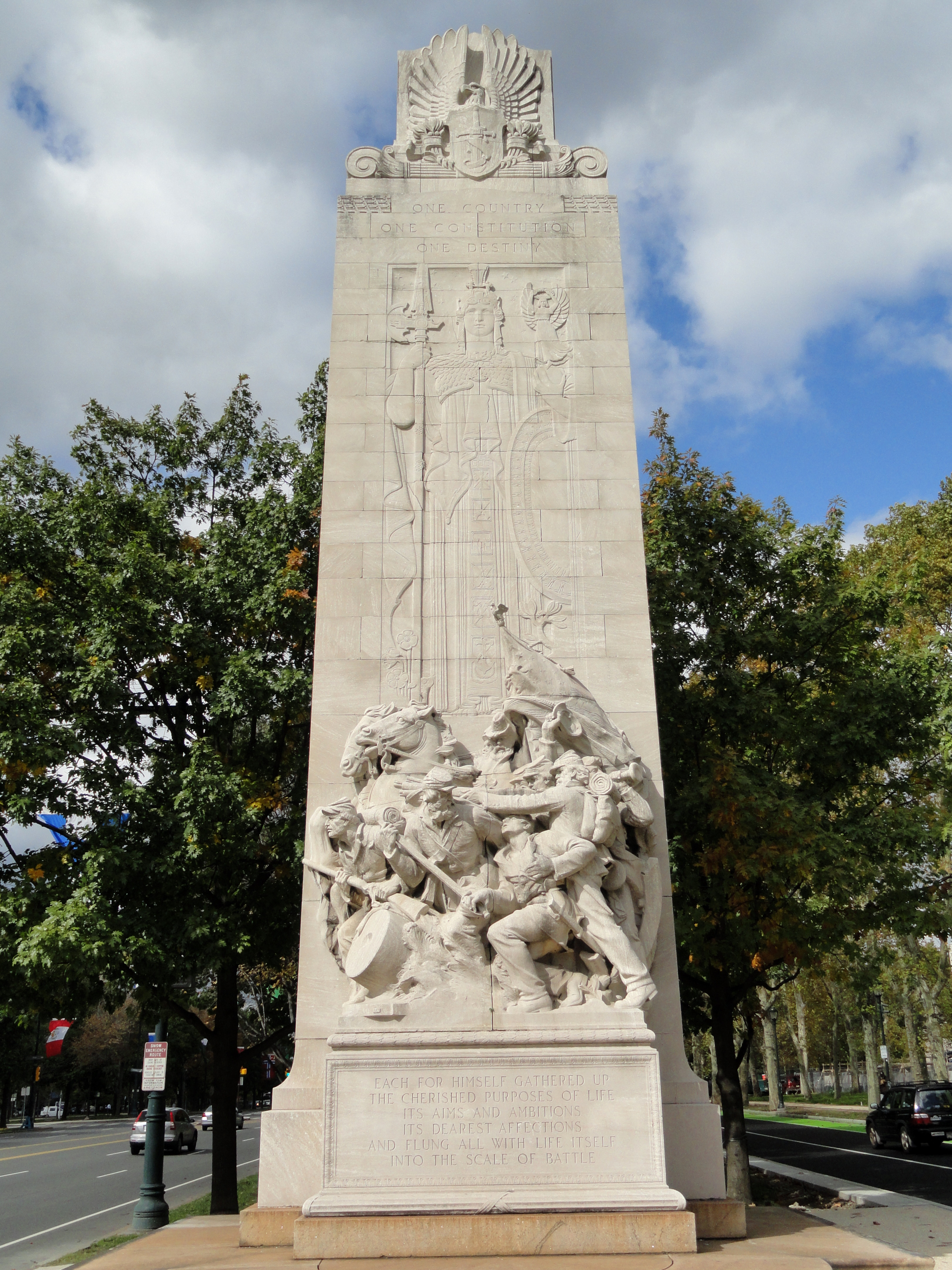
Civil War Soldiers' Monument (1921), Benjamin Franklin Parkway, Philadelphia, Pennsylvania. Carved by the Piccirilli Brothers.

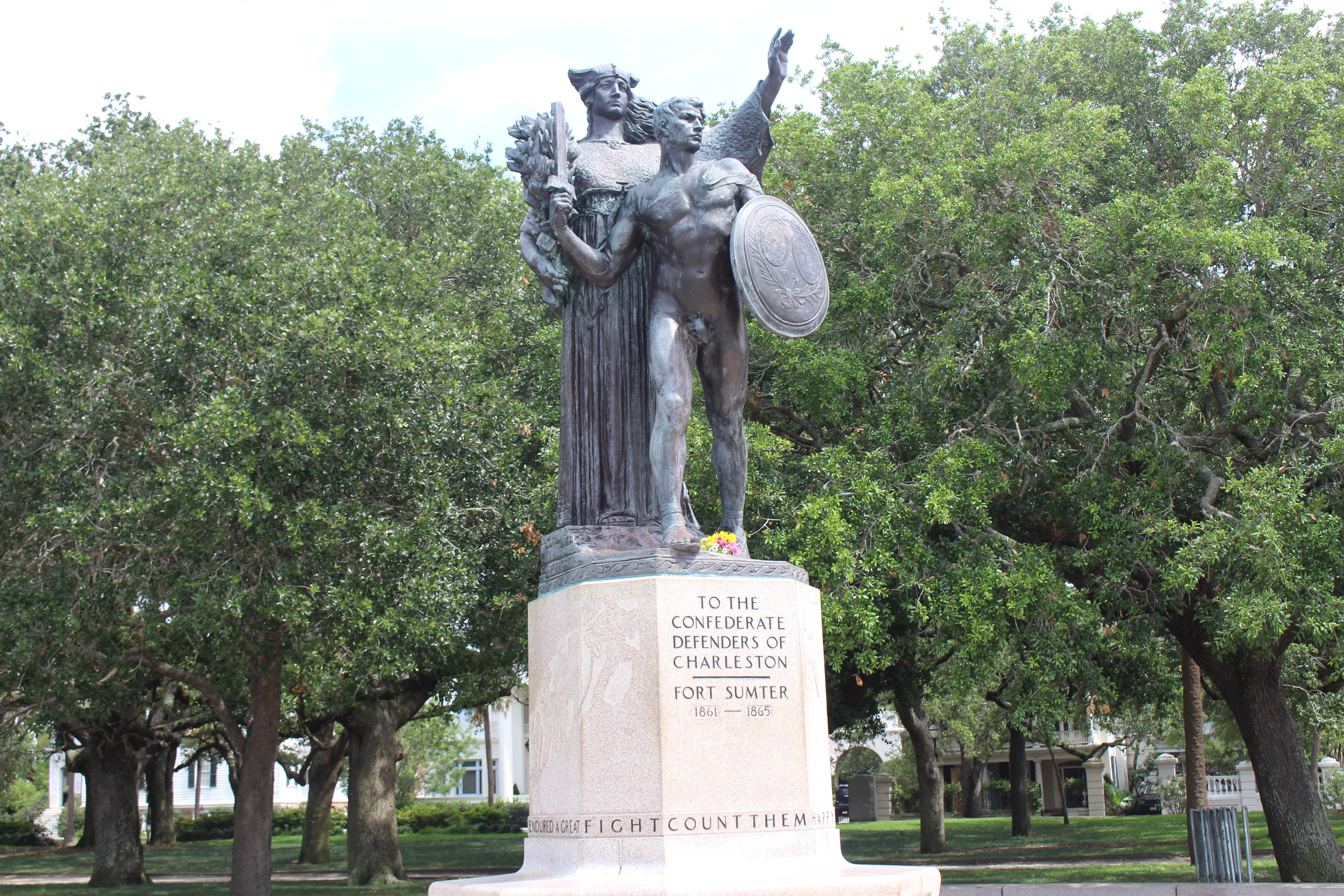
Confederate Defenders of Charleston (1932), Charleston, South Carolina

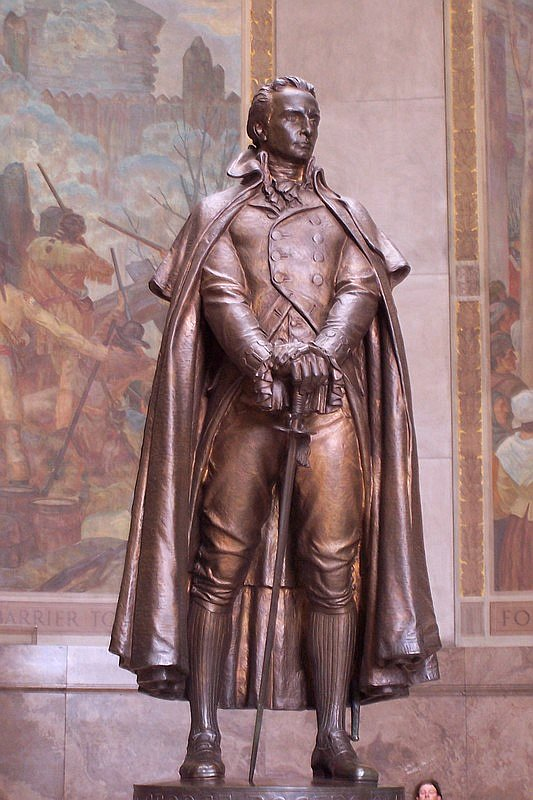
George Rogers Clark (1934), George Rogers Clark Memorial, Vincennes, Indiana.

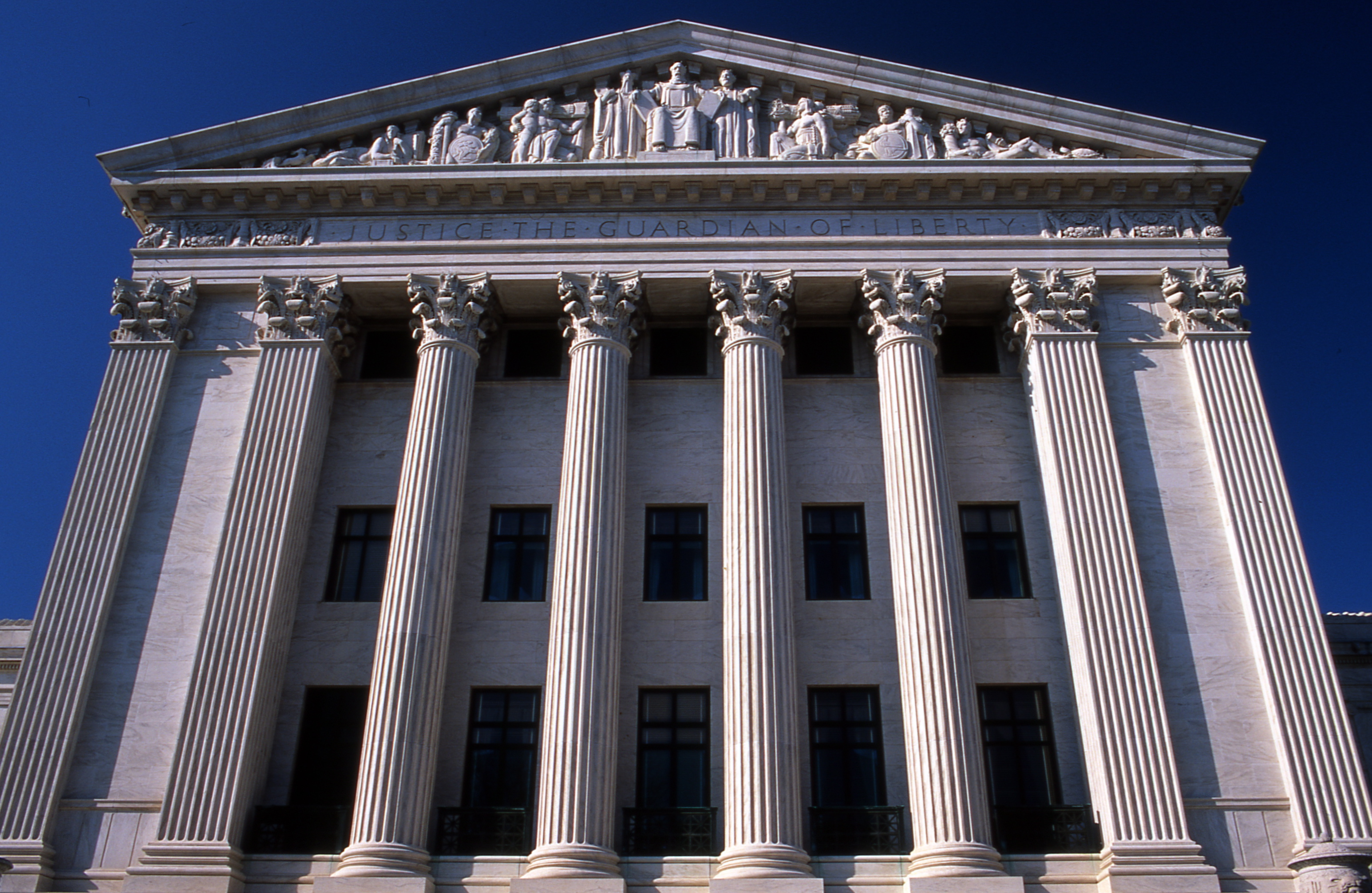
Justice, the Guardian of Liberty (1935), East Pediment, United States Supreme Court building, Washington, D.C.

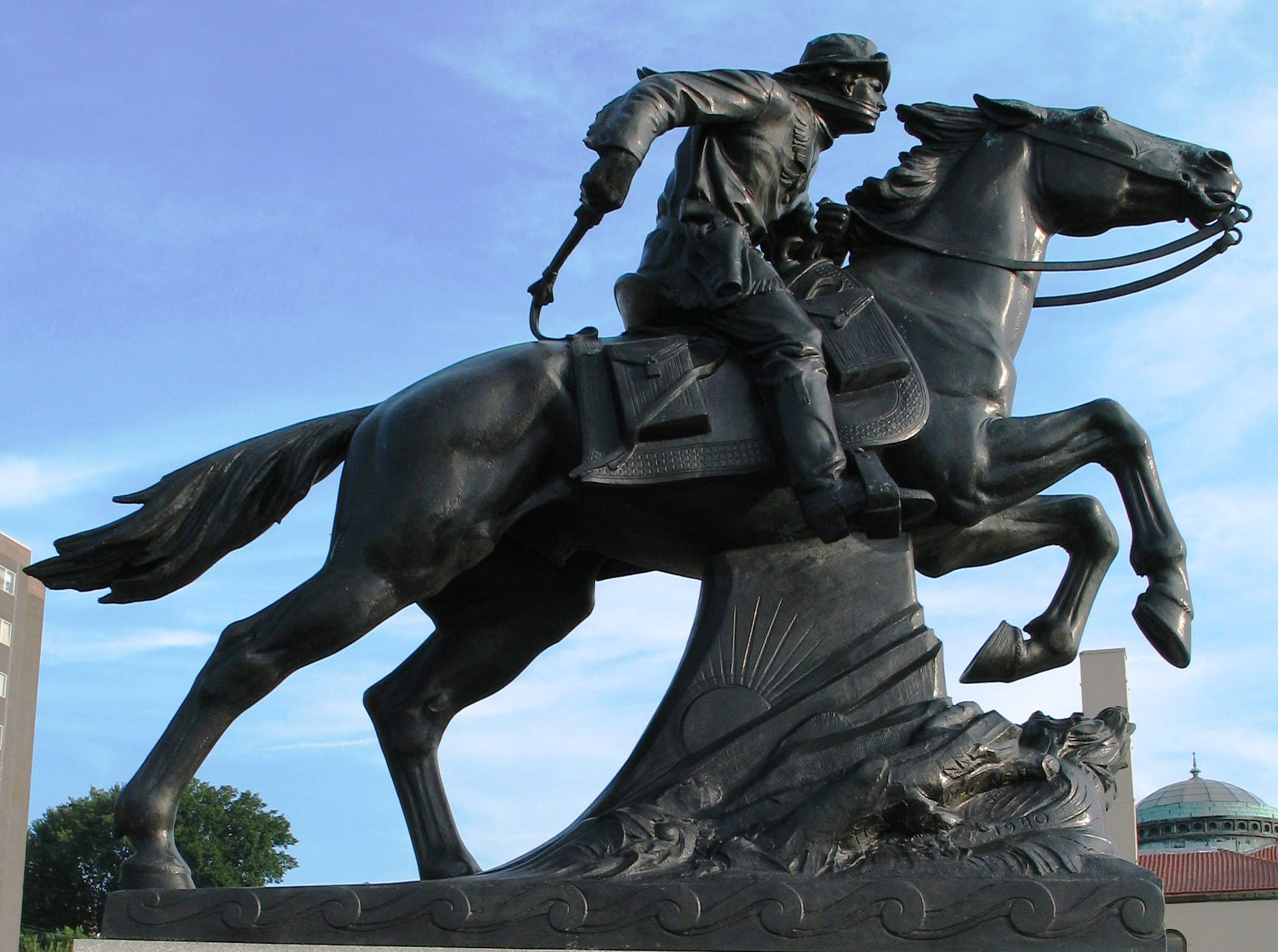
Pony Express Monument (1940), Civic Center Triangle, St. Joseph, Missouri.
