= William McKinley Monument =

Sculpture in Columbus, Ohio, U.S.

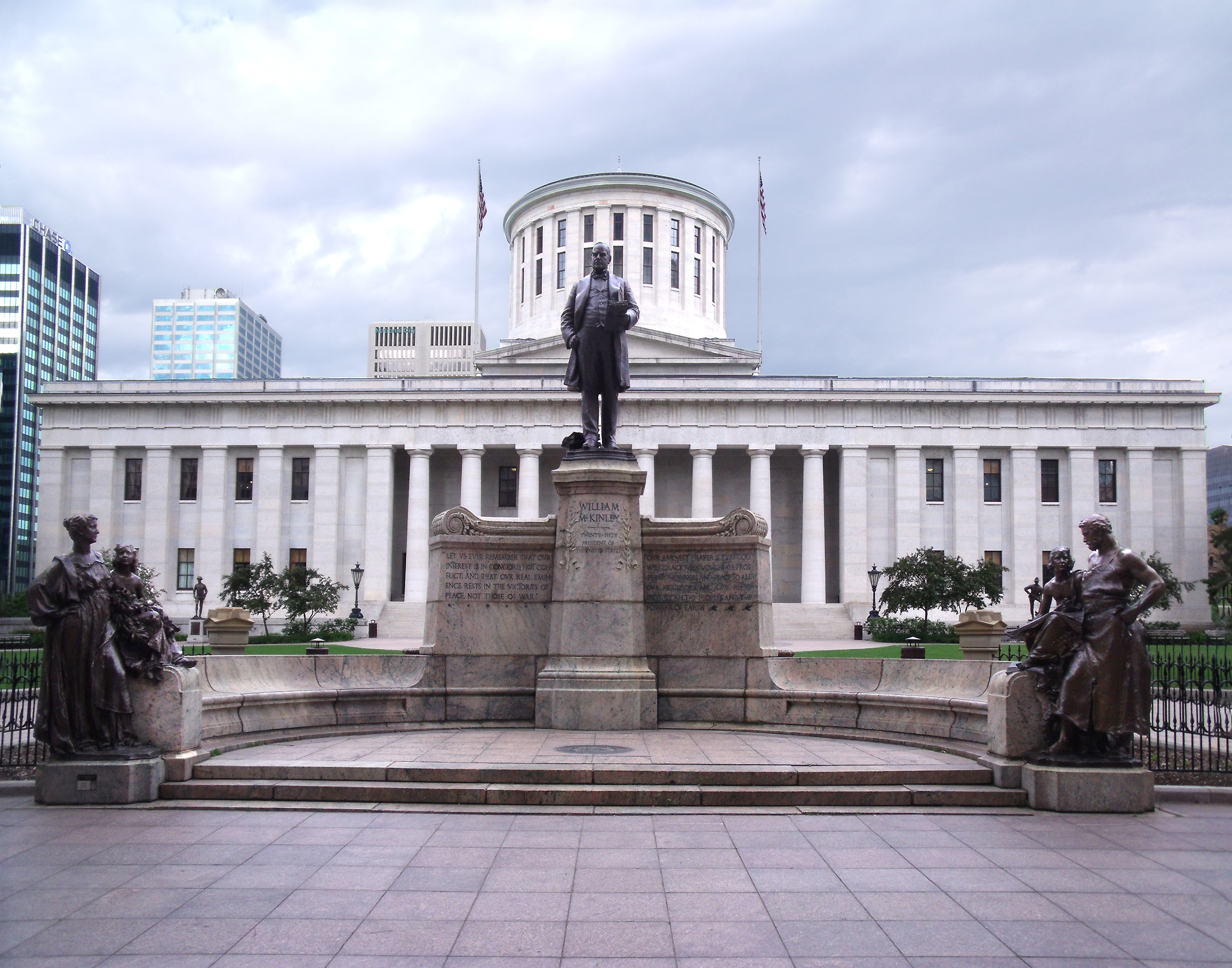
- Artist: Hermon Atkins MacNeil and Carol Brooks MacNeil
- Year: 1903-1906
- Completion date: September 6, 1906
- Medium: Bronze, granite
- Location: Columbus, Ohio, United States; 39°57′40″N 83°00′01″W

The William McKinley Monument, or McKinley Memorial, is a statue and memorial honoring the assassinated United States President William McKinley which stands on Capitol Square to the west of main entrance of the Ohio Statehouse in Downtown Columbus, Ohio.

The work was sculpted by Hermon Atkins MacNeil and Carol Brooks MacNeil from 1903 to 1906, and was dedicated on September 6, 1906.

== Background ==
McKinley had served two consecutive two-year terms as Governor of Ohio, from 1892 to 1896, before being elected as the 25th president of the United States at the 1896 United States presidential election. He was assassinated less than a year after being re-elected for a second term in 1900.

The monument in Columbus was erected at the spot where McKinley is said to have gone every day to wave his handkerchief to his bedridden wife Ida McKinley, who would be watching from the Neil House hotel on the other side of High Street. McKinley's wave was recognized by local residents, who began to wait outside the hotel to see it; the daily routine thus became a popular attraction. The Neil House hotel served as their residence in the city throughout his governorship and was torn down and replaced with a larger hotel in 1923, which itself closed in 1980 to make way for the Huntington Center.

The memorial was suggested days after McKinley's assassination, and The Columbus Dispatch newspaper company took to raising the funds to create the memorial. The work was sculpted by Hermon Atkins MacNeil with the assistance of his wife Carol Brooks MacNeil, at a cost of $75,000. It was commissioned in 1903, and installed c. 1906 by Lord and Hewlett. The monument was dedicated on September 6, 1906, the fifth anniversary of McKinley's assassination, at a ceremony attended by Alice Roosevelt Longworth, daughter of Theodore Roosevelt (McKinley's vice-president and successor as president). Its dedication ceremony attracted about 50,000 people, some of whom were injured when the crowd attempted to grab pieces of ribbon and bunting as souvenirs. The memorial was temporarily removed in the 1960s to allow the installation of an underground parking garage beneath the west lawn of the Ohio Statehouse.

== Description ==
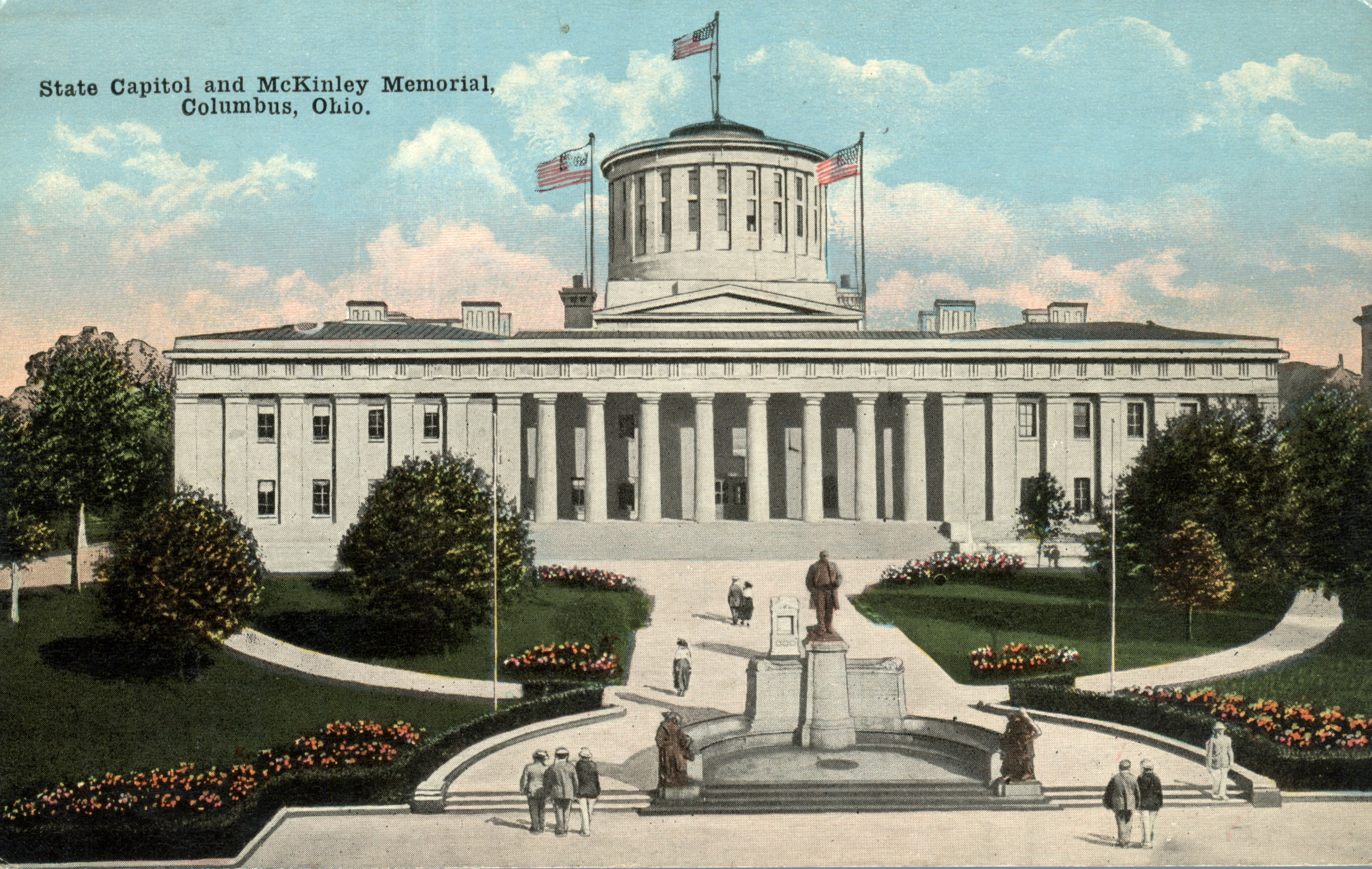
20th century postcard showing the monument and Ohio Statehouse

The 10-foot-tall (3.0 m) bronze statue depicts McKinley standing in a long Prince Albert coat, waistcoat, and trousers, holding papers in his left hand, as if delivering a speech. It is mounted on a 15-foot-high (4.6 m) granite pedestal, the front of which bears the inscription: "William / M^{c}Kinley / Twenty-fifth / President of / the United States". The rear of the pedestal has a relief carving of an eagle, above a further inscription: "Born at Niles, Ohio / January 29, 1843. / Died at Buffalo, N.Y. / September 14, 1901. // Erected by / the state of Ohio / and / the citizens of Columbus. / A.D. MCMVI." The pedestal is made of Pompton pink granite from the quarries at Pompton Lakes and Riverdale, New Jersey.

Wings extending to either side of the pedestal bear further inscriptions, quoting a speech delivered by McKinley at the Pan-American Exposition in Buffalo, New York, on September 5, 1901, the day before he was assassinated: "Let us ever remember that our / interest is in concord, not con/flict; and that our real emin/ence rests in the victories of / peace, not those of war." (left) and "Our earnest prayer is that God / will graciously vouch safe pros/perity, happiness and peace to all / our neighbors, and like blessings to all peoples and the powers of earth." (right) On the back of the monument is a quotation from a speech delivered to the United States Senate by John Hay, who served as Secretary of State under McKinley and Roosevelt: "The fame of such a man / will shine like a beacon through the mists of ages" and "An object of reverence, of imitation, and of love."

Lower wings continue to form a curved exedra with a 100 ft (30 m) long bench, terminating with sculptural groups representing Peace (woman and girl, left) and Prosperity (man and boy, right).

== Detail of statues and base ==
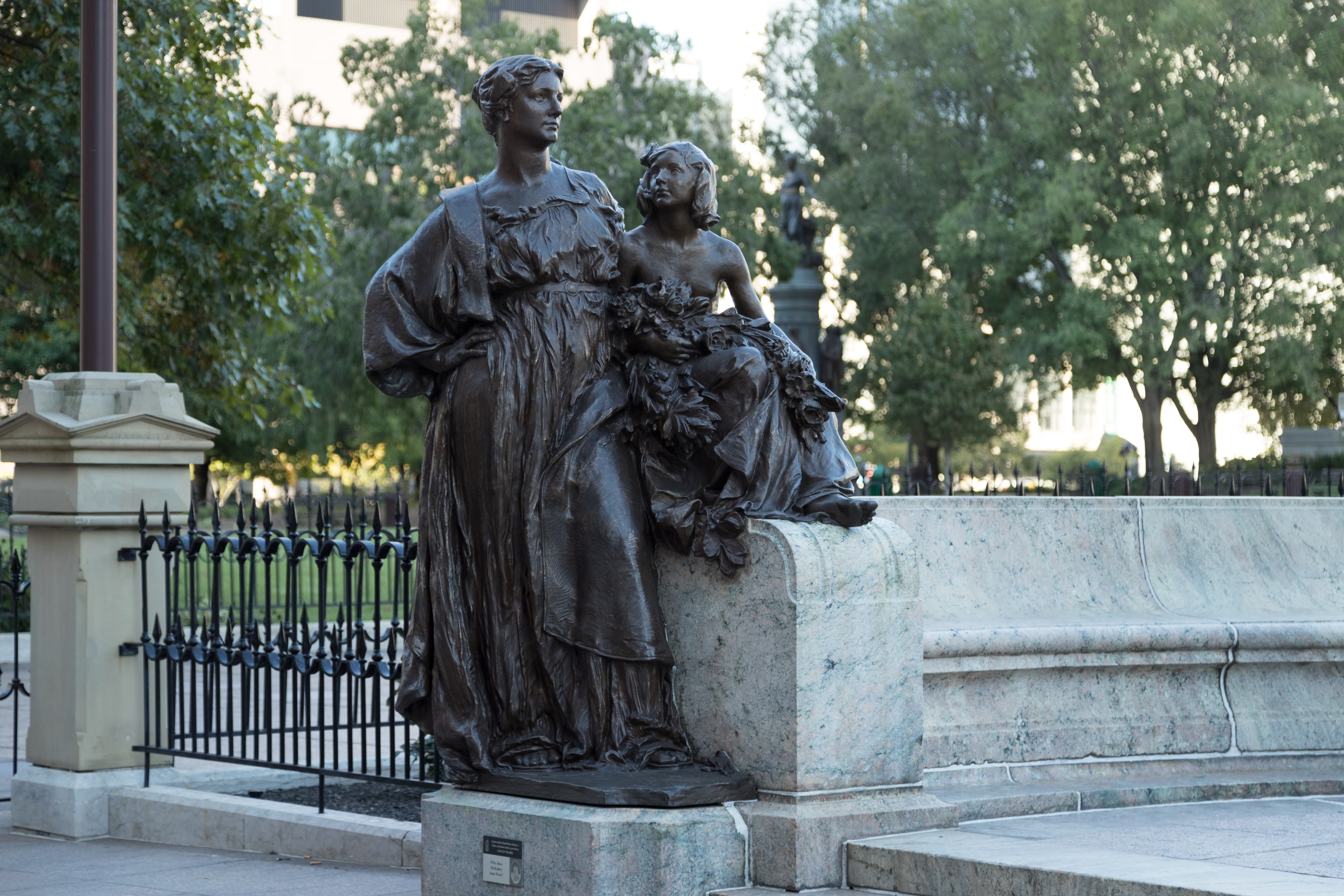
Peace

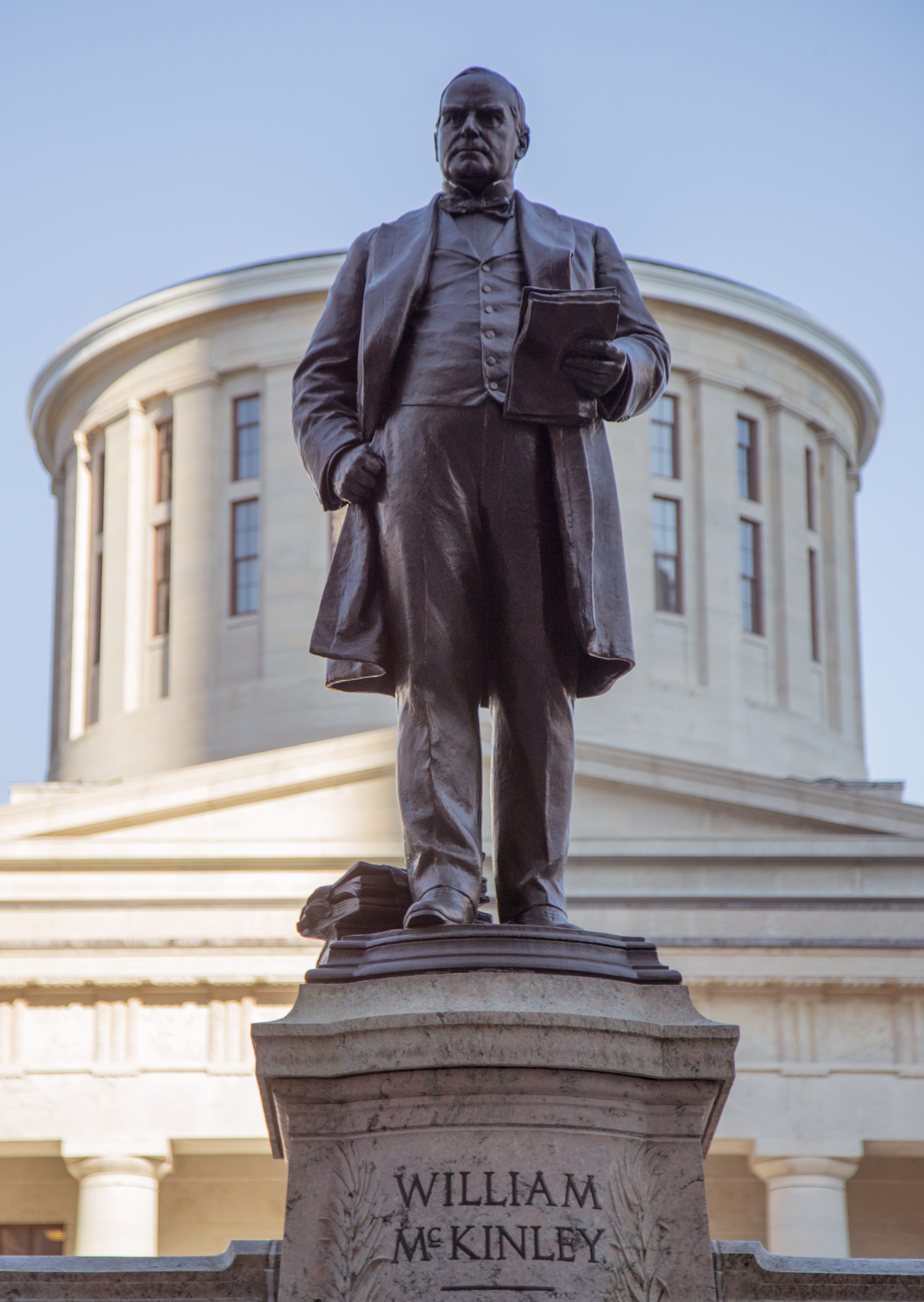
William McKinley

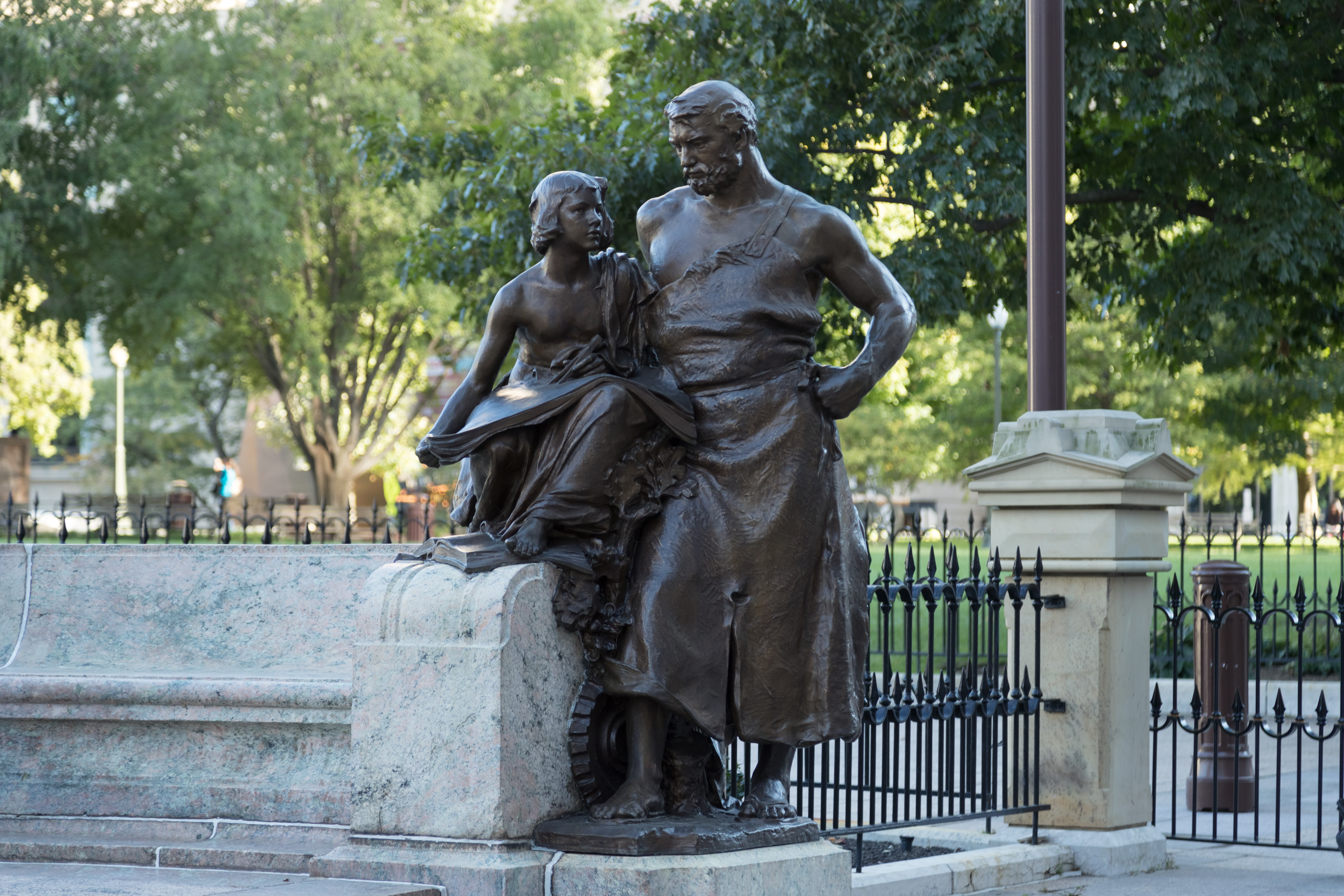
Prosperity

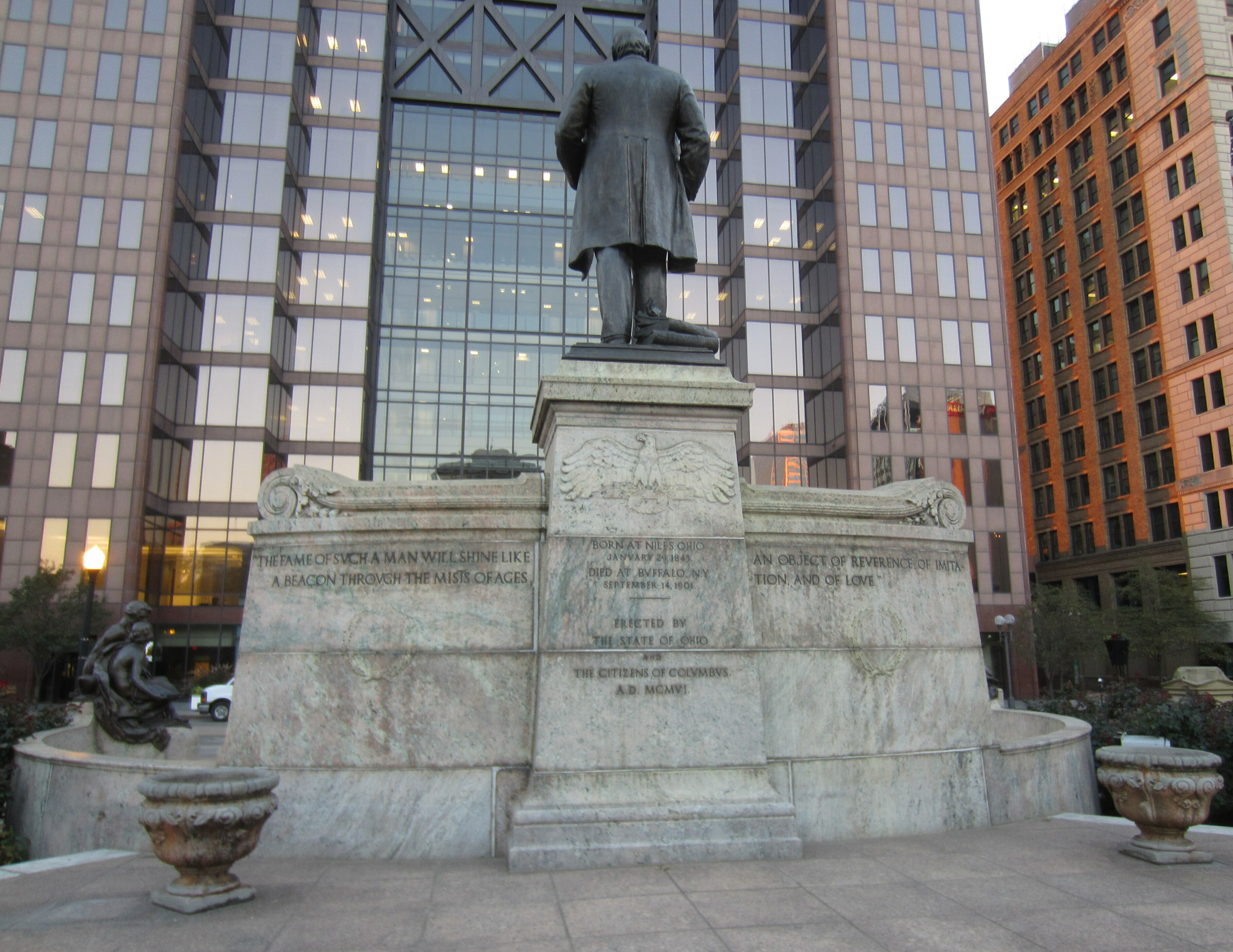
Reverse side

== See also ==
- McKinley Monument, Buffalo, New York
- McKinley National Memorial, Canton, Ohio
- William McKinley Memorial, San Francisco, California
- List of sculptures of presidents of the United States
- Presidential memorials in the United States
