= White Rabbits (sculptors) =

Group of women sculptors

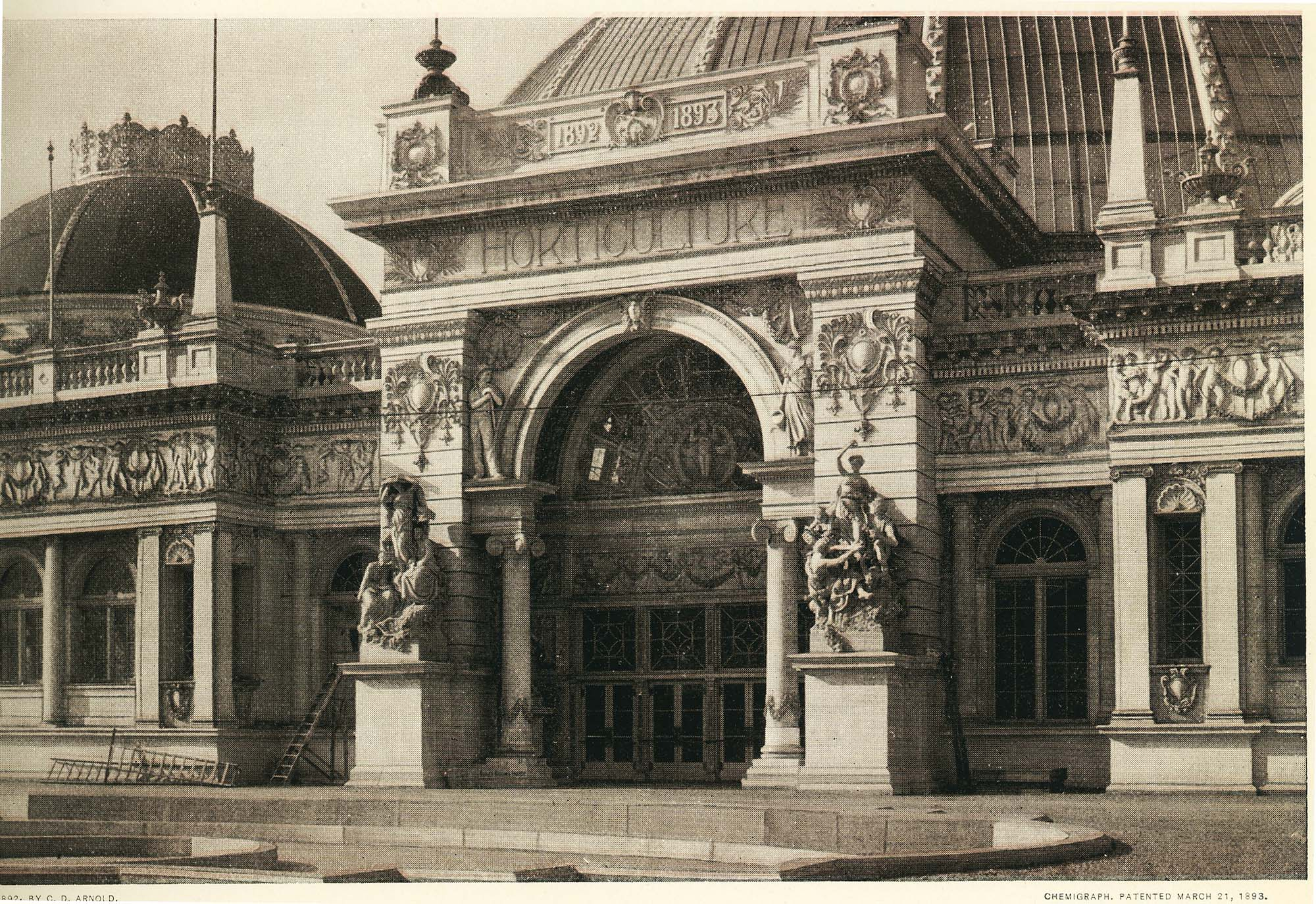
Horticultural Building

The White Rabbits were a group of women sculptors who worked with Lorado Taft at the World's Columbian Exposition in 1893.

As the date of the world fair's opening grew closer, Taft realized that he would not be able to complete the decorations in time. Discovering that all the male sculptors he had in mind were already employed elsewhere, he asked Daniel Burnham if he could use women assistants, an occurrence that was virtually unheard of at that time. Burnham's reply was that Taft could "hire anyone, even white rabbits, if they can get the work done." Taft, an instructor of sculpture at the Chicago Art Institute who had many qualified women students and who frequently employed women assistants himself, brought in a group of women assistants who were promptly dubbed "the White Rabbits."

== The sculptors ==
From the ranks of the White Rabbits were to emerge some of the most talented and successful women sculptors of the next generation. These include:

- Julia Bracken (1871–1942)
- Carol Brooks (1871–1944)
- Ellen Rankin Copp (1853-1901)
- Helen Farnsworth (1867–1916)
- Margaret Gerow (whose art career ended with her marriage to sculptor Alexander Phimister Proctor)
- Mary Lawrence (1868–1945)
- Bessie Potter (1872–1954)
- Janet Scudder (1869–1940)
- Enid Yandell (1870–1934)
- Jean Pond Miner Coburn (1866–1967)
- Zulime Taft Lorado Taft's sister

== Related work ==
Besides their work on the Horticultural Building, several of the White Rabbits obtained other commissions to produce sculpture at the Exposition. Among these were Lawrence's statue of Columbus, placed in front of the Administration Building, Yandell's Daniel Boone for the Kentucky Building, Bracken's Illinois Greeting the Nations in the Illinois Building, and Farnsworth's Columbia for the Wisconsin Building.

== See also ==
- Women artists and the Women's Building at the World's Columbian Exposition
