= Scarsdale station =

Metro-North Railroad station in New York

Scarsdale
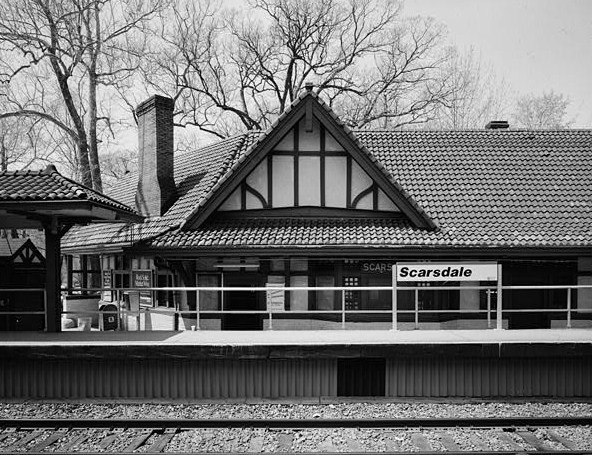
- Scarsdale railroad station

General information
- Location: 1 Depot Place, Scarsdale, New York
- Line: Harlem Line
- Platforms: 2 side platforms
- Tracks: 2
- Connections: Bee-Line Bus System: 63, 64, 65, 66

Construction
- Parking: 35 spaces
- Accessible: yes

Other information
- Fare zone: 4

History
- Opened: December 1, 1844
- Rebuilt: 1904 (NYC), 2007 (MNRR)
- Electrified: 700V (DC) third rail

Passengers
- 2018: 4,536 (Metro-North)
- Rank: 7 of 109

Services
Preceding station	Metro-North Railroad	Following station
Crestwood toward Grand Central	Harlem Line	Hartsdale toward North White Plains

Former services
Preceding station	New York Central Railroad	Following station
Crestwood toward New York	Harlem Division	Hartsdale toward Chatham
- Scarsdale Railroad Station
- U.S. National Register of Historic Places
- Location: Scarsdale, New York, USA
- Coordinates: 40°59′23.64″N 73°48′29.88″W
- Built: 1902
- Architect: Nichols, Grant
- Architectural style: Tudor Revival
- NRHP reference No.: 00000837
- Added to NRHP: July 27, 2000
Location

Scarsdale station is a commuter rail stop on the Metro-North Railroad's Harlem Line, located in Scarsdale, New York. Scarsdale is the southernmost station on the two-track section of the Harlem Line; a third track begins to the south.

Scarsdale is the second busiest Metro-North station in Westchester County, after White Plains. It is the southernmost station in the Zone 4 Metro-North fare zone. As of August 2006, weekday commuter ridership was 4,080, and there are 919 parking spots.

== History ==
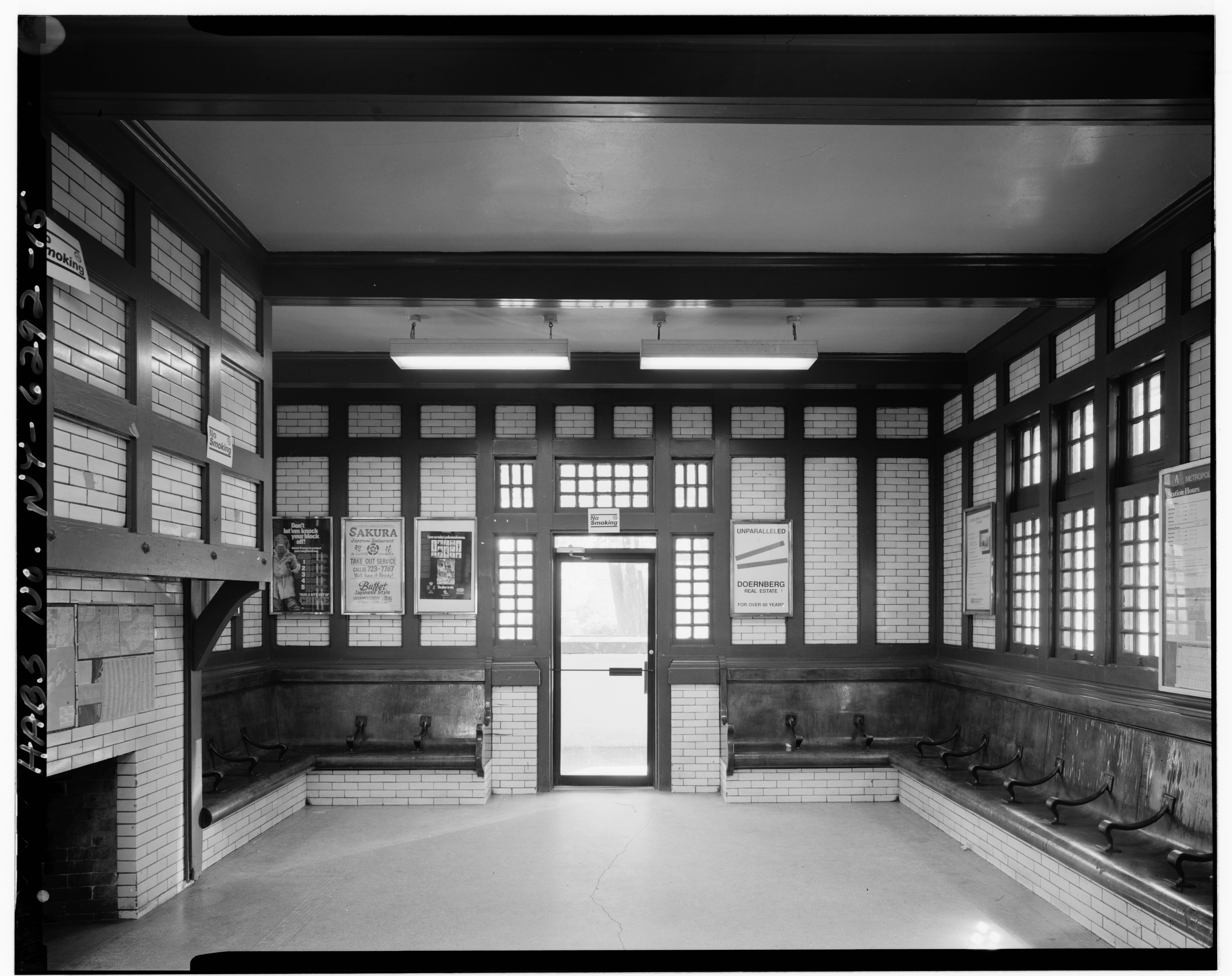
Interior

The New York and Harlem Railroad laid tracks through Scarsdale during the 1840s, and established a station in Scarsdale as far back as 1846. The existing station house was built by the New York Central and Hudson River Railroad in 1904 (although some evidence dates it back to 1902) in the Tudor Revival style. As with the rest of the Harlem Line, the merger of New York Central with Pennsylvania Railroad in 1968 transformed the station into a Penn Central Railroad station. Penn Central's continuous financial despair throughout the 1970s forced them to turn over their commuter service to the Metropolitan Transportation Authority, and it officially became part of Metro-North in 1983. The station has been on the National Register of Historic Places since the year 2000, and faced a restoration project in 2007.

A renovation for accessibility, which added an elevator connecting to the existing overpass and platform, was completed in January 2024.

A train caught fire on January 28, 2026 at Scarsdale station.

== Station layout ==
The station has two high-level side platforms, which are 12 cars long.

== See also ==
- National Register of Historic Places listings in southern Westchester County, New York

== Bibliography ==
- Dunbar, Seymour (1915). A History of Travel in America: Being an Outline of the Development in Modes of Travel from Archaic Vehicles of Colonial Times to the Completion of the First Transcontinental Railroad: the Influence of the Indians on the Free Movement and Territorial Unity of the White Race: the Part Played by Travel Methods in the Economic Conquest of the Continent: and Those Related Human Experiences, Changing Social Conditions and Governmental Attitudes which Accompanied the Growth of a National Travel System · Volume 3. Indianapolis, Indiana: Bobbs-Merrill Company.
