= The Sun Vow =

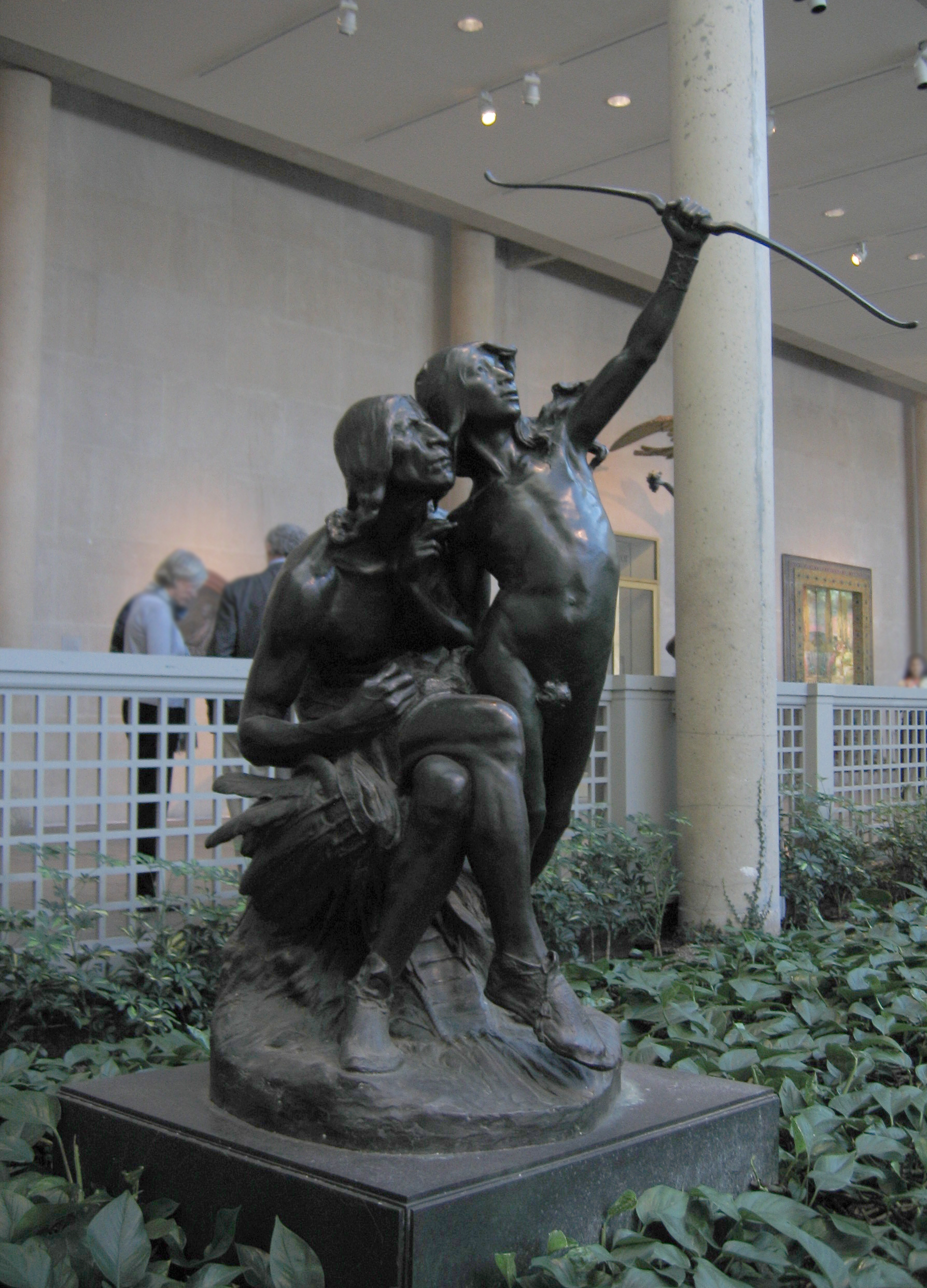
- The sculpture at the Metropolitan Museum of Art in 2006
- Artist: Hermon Atkins MacNeil
- Year: 1899
- Type: Sculpture
- Medium: Bronze
- Location: Metropolitan Museum of Art; New York City, New York, United States

The Sun Vow is an 1899 bronze sculpture by American artist Hermon Atkins MacNeil. It was cast in 1919 and measures 72 inches (180 cm) x 32.5 inches (83 cm) x 54 inches (140 cm). The sculpture is part of the Metropolitan Museum of Art's collection.
