= Lower Naugatuck Valley =

Geographic region of the U.S. state of Connecticut

The Lower Naugatuck Valley, also known locally as simply "The Valley", is a geographic area located around the confluence of the southern parts of the Housatonic and Naugatuck Rivers. It consists of the municipalities of Seymour, Derby, Ansonia, and outside the Naugatuck watershed, Shelton, which constitute the Valley Council of Governments. The scope of the Lower Naugatuck Valley is also sometimes extended to encompass the next three towns upstream and to the north, which are Beacon Falls, Naugatuck, and Oxford, Connecticut.

During the 19th and 20th centuries, the Valley was one of the main manufacturing centers in New England, and most of the Valley communities were emblematic New England mill towns.

In 2000, the seven towns in the extended Lower Naugatuck Valley region were selected as an All-America City, varying the title of that award as "All-America Valley".

== History ==
This was the most prosperous part of Connecticut in the early days of industrialization. The region was the location of key factories in national industries, most notably the brass industry, rubber manufacturing, petrochemical production and shipbuilding. Naugatuck was the birthplace of Naugahyde. This industrial past has given the region a heavy urban landscape, with many factory buildings rising prominently along the riverside and dominating the central districts of the towns.

After the Great Depression, however, the area began a prolonged period of deindustrialization and lost large portions of its manufacturing base, leaving behind weak economies and empty buildings typical of Rust Belt landscapes. In 1955, the area's fortunes were further impaired when floodwaters brought by Hurricane Diane devastated the region. From Naugatuck to Shelton, entire downtown neighborhoods were washed away, leaving the region in disaster. High unemployment, poverty, and isolation marked the more urban Naugatuck Valley cities through the 1980s. Floodwaters even went into surrounding areas such as the lower portion of the Greater Waterbury area.

A major effort to revitalize the economy of the Naugatuck Valley started with the creation of the Naugatuck Valley Development Corporation in 1979, a nonprofit, public private partnership headquartered in Waterbury. The corporation board of directors accepted the challenge of renovation and reuse of the closed and deteriorating one million square foot former Chase Brass mill.[1] "Chase Plant to be Revitalized", Waterbury Republican, May 26, 1979

The board of directors recruited Charles J Blankenship to be Executive Director and Chief Executive Officer in November 1979. Blankenship was previously the Pennsylvania Director of Economic Development. He was given the responsibility of turning the deteriorated property into a new industrial complex with much needed jobs and tax base. [2] "Industrial Development Agency Now Has a Director," Waterbury Republican, November 18, 1979. The property was named the Waterbury Industrial Commons and work quickly began on renovations and tenant leasing. Unused land was developed into two industrial parks and parcels were sold to fund renovations. [3] "Big Year Ahead for Former Case Plant", Waterbury Republican, January 27, 1980.

The conversion of the industrial complex into prime industrial space offered renewed hope to other aging mill towns in the Naugatuck Valley seeking to refurbish old buildings for modern use. [4] "Turning Old into New", The New York Times, June 26, 1983. The successfully completed project was sold to private developers in January 1983. Blankenship was recruited to a new position after negotiating the final sale.[5] "Commons Leader Leaving", Waterbury Republican, January 15, 1984.

Since the early 1990s, rural and southern portions of the Naugatuck Valley have evolved into sprawling commuter towns. Communities like Shelton and Oxford have become popular bedroom communities for residents working in New York City and lower Fairfield County. Vast sections of farmland up and down the Naugatuck Valley have also been developed for the building of luxury homes. Despite this suburbanization, however, the region is still tied to its core city centers like Derby and downtown areas of Ansonia and Naugatuck, thus retaining its working-class flavor.

During the Vietnam War, factories such as the Naugatuck chemical plant were key players in the production of the chemical Agent Orange, heavily used in herbicidal warfare.

== Culture ==
Along with other towns in Connecticut, the Naugatuck Valley maintains a high emotional and cultural involvement with its high school football teams and their rivalries. Football shapes many peoples lives in the valley with high school alumni, faculty and students giving a huge fan base which also includes families and town citizens. The Naugatuck Valley League serves six high schools in the Valley: Derby, Naugatuck, Oxford, Woodland, Seymour, and Ansonia. The Naugatuck Valley League also contains nine schools that are outside of the Valley: Kennedy, Torrington, Watertown, Crosby, Holy Cross, St. Paul, Wilby, Wolcott, and Waterbury Career Academy. The league included Sacred Heart before its closure in 2021. Politically, the Valley is far more conservative than much of the rest of Connecticut, and supported George W. Bush in the 2004 election, centrist Senator Joe Lieberman in the 2006 Democratic primary; and favored Republicans John McCain in the 2008 election, Mitt Romney in the 2012 election, Donald Trump in the 2016, 2020 and 2024 elections, and Thomas C. Foley in the 2010 and 2014 gubernatorial elections.

The Valley is home to the Valley Arts Council. The council was established under the guidance of the Greater Valley Chamber of Commerce in 2000. The Council serves the seven municipalities that comprise this region. The region is particularly strong with many talented Artists of all skills, mediums and levels. The Arts Council has a fine Art gallery on Main Street in downtown Ansonia (est.2019). The gallery was in neighboring Derby for over ten years. Surprisingly, the Valley is a wealth of Artists and Artisans. Some world class artists, in their specific genres, work and live in these communities.

The Valley also has a notable population of Poles, with shops and other various services catering to this population.
