= Councils of governments in Connecticut =

Subdivision of Connecticut, United States

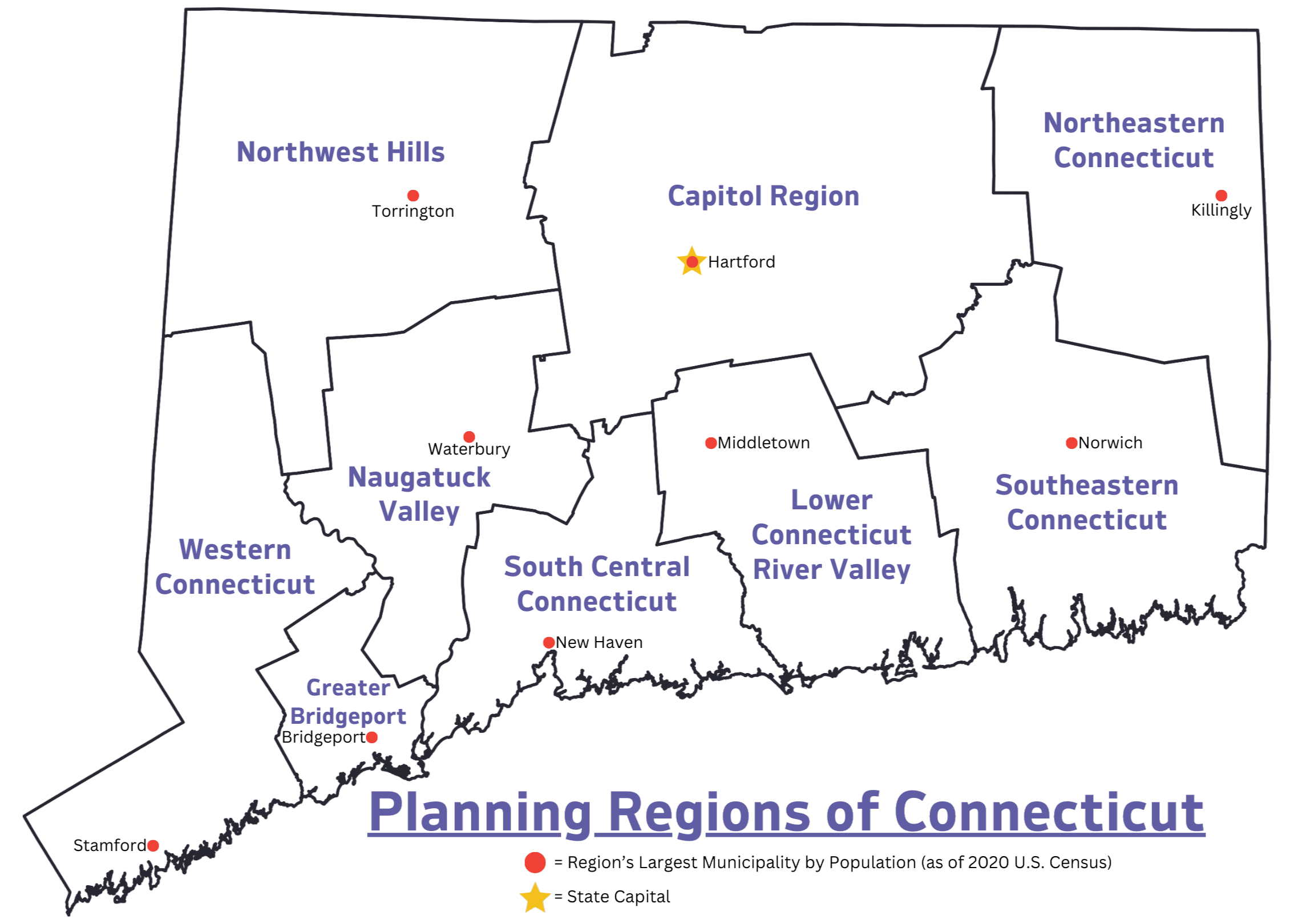
- A clickable Connecticut planning region map Clickable map of Connecticut planning regions
- Location: Connecticut, United States
- Number: 9
- Populations: 98,096 (Northeastern CT) – 994,115 (Capitol Region)
- Areas: 140.46 square miles (363.8 km^{2}) (Metropolitan) – 1,027.46 square miles (2,661.1 km^{2}) (Capitol Region)
- Government: Council of governments
- Subdivisions: cities, towns, unincorporated communities, census designated place (Note: All land in Connecticut is covered by an incorporated city or town. Planning region borders match constituent city and town borders. See Local government in Connecticut)

In Connecticut, councils of governments, also known as COGs, are regional planning organizations that bring together the chief elected officials or professional managers from member municipalities in Connecticut. Since 2015 and 2022, the Connecticut planning regions served by COGs have been recognized as county equivalents under state and federal law respectively, superseding the eight legacy counties in the state for most federal funding and statistical purposes.

The COGs are meant to aid coordination among neighboring cities and towns, and between the towns and the state government, on issues including land use, zoning, and transportation. They serve some functions analogous to county governments in other states, but have no independent taxing authority (Connecticut disbanded county governments in 1960). Councils of government also host some intermunicipal services based on the needs and voluntary participation of member or client municipalities. Councils, or COGs, receive funding through membership dues, state grants, and federal grants.

As of 2018, Connecticut has 9 regional councils following a series of mergers and realignments between 2013 and 2015. Populations are from the 2010 census. For current membership, see List of municipalities in Connecticut. Some COGs also serve as either federal metropolitan planning organizations (MPO), rural planning organizations (RPO), or share staff with one or more MPOs/RPOs within their borders; the Western Connecticut COG, for example, supports both the Housatonic Valley MPO and the South Western CT MPO.

== History ==
The dissolution of county governments in 1960 created an absence of a regionally-oriented governmental level, which created problems for land use and infrastructure planning. Because the power once reserved for county governments was now in the hands of municipal administrations, major land use, environmental, and infrastructure issues often pitted one town against another, resulting in little or no progress on some projects. Complicating this, the state constitution delegates a large portion of the state's authority to the towns. That means a major multi-town project could be completely derailed if only one of the affected towns opposed the project, since the project would require each affected town to issue its own permits for the portions within its territory. This often led to long and costly lawsuits between towns that supported a regional-scale project and those opposed.

In an effort to resolve these conflicts, the State of Connecticut passed legislation in the 1980s establishing fifteen regional councils, which cluster towns with similar demographics into an administrative planning region, in contrast to the old county structure. In 2013, the Connecticut Office of Policy and Management approved a merger of the Connecticut River Estuary and the Midstate planning regions to form the Lower Connecticut River Valley Planning Region.

In 2014 the state Office of Policy and Management (OPM) completed a comprehensive analysis of the boundaries of logical planning regions in Connecticut under Section 16a-4c of the Connecticut General Statutes (2014 Supplement). This analysis resulted in the number of planning regions being reduced from the original fifteen to nine, as a result of four voluntary consolidations and the elimination of two planning regions. As required by statute, the OPM notified the chief executive officer in each municipality that was proposed for redesignation and offered them a thirty day period to appeal the proposed redesignation. Of the seventeen municipalities that were proposed for redesignation by OPM, only three opted to exercise their right to appeal. OPM staff attended meetings in Bristol, Burlington and Plymouth, and subsequently granted each of the appeals.

In 2019 the state recommended to the United States Census Bureau that the nine Councils of Governments replace eight legacy counties in Connecticut for statistical purposes. This proposal was approved by the Census Bureau in 2022, and was fully implemented by 2024. In 2015, the State of Connecticut had previously recognized COGs as county equivalents under state law in anticipation of future census recognition, allowing them to apply for funding and grants made available to county governments in other states.

== Functions ==
Connecticut’s planning regions provide a geographic framework within which municipalities can jointly address common interests, and coordinate such interests with state plans and programs. State statutes authorize the secretary of the Office of Policy and Management (OPM) to designate or redesignate the boundaries of logical planning regions, whereas the member municipalities of each planning region are authorized under separate state statutes to establish a formal governance structure known as a regional council of governments (RCOG).

Unlike county governments, the authority of regional councils is limited to land use policy-making, infrastructure development, emergency preparedness, and long-term planning for population and economic changes for the communities within their respective jurisdiction. The regional councils have no taxing authority; they are financed by funds from the state and member towns.

Regional councils also have some limited law enforcement authority. If approved by the regional council, member towns can put forth a portion of their law enforcement resources to create regional task forces to combat organized crime and drug trafficking. With assistance from the Connecticut State Police and FBI, several regions have established such task forces. The Northern Connecticut Gang Task Force, Bridgeport Violent Crimes Task Force, and New Haven Safe Streets Gang Task Force are examples. Individual law enforcement agencies contributing resources to these regional task forces retain their original identities, rather than assuming the identity of the regional task force.

Several similar regional agencies exist, including federally designated metropolitan planning organizations. These include several dual purpose agencies or continuing organizations that were once designated state regional planning agencies. Several may be consolidated in the future.

== Alphabetical listing ==
Planning region	FIPS code	Council of governments (COG)	Metropolitan Planning Organization (MPO)	Largest city/town (by population)	Executive Director	Population (2025)	Area	Map
Capitol Planning Region	110	Capitol Region Council of Governments (CRCOG)	(Same)	Hartford	Matthew Hart	994,115	1,027.3 sq mi (2,661 km^{2})	State map highlighting Capitol Planning Region
Greater Bridgeport Planning Region	120	Connecticut Metropolitan Council of Governments (MetroCOG)	Greater Bridgeport and Valley MPO	Bridgeport	Matthew Fulda	337,697	140.2 sq mi (363 km^{2})	State map highlighting Greater Bridgeport Planning Region
Lower Connecticut River Valley Planning Region	130	Lower Connecticut River Valley Council of Governments (RiverCOG)	(Same)	Middletown	Samuel S. Gold	177,311	424.1 sq mi (1,098 km^{2})	State map highlighting Lower Connecticut River Valley Planning Region
Naugatuck Valley Planning Region	140	Naugatuck Valley Council of Governments (NVCOG)	Central Naugatuck MPO	Waterbury	Rick Dunne	463,349	412.8 sq mi (1,069 km^{2})	State map highlighting Naugatuck Valley Planning Region
Northeastern Connecticut Planning Region	150	Northeastern Connecticut Council of Governments (NECCOG)	(Same/Rural Planning Region)	Killingly	John Filchak	98,096	553.9 sq mi (1,435 km^{2})	State map highlighting Northeastern Connecticut Planning Region
Northwest Hills Planning Region	160	Northwest Hills Council of Governments (NHCOG)	(Same/Rural Planning Region)	Torrington	Robert A. Phillips	114,690	786.6 sq mi (2,037 km^{2})	State map highlighting Northwest Hills Planning Region
South Central Connecticut Planning Region	170	South Central Regional Council of Governments (SCRCOG)	(Same)	New Haven	Laura Francis	578,741	367.2 sq mi (951 km^{2})	State map highlighting South Central Connecticut Planning Region
Southeastern Connecticut Planning Region	180	Southeastern Connecticut Council of Governments (SCCOG)	(Same)	Norwich	Amanda E. Kennedy	284,015	598.1 sq mi (1,549 km^{2})	State map highlighting Southeastern Connecticut Planning Region
Western Connecticut Planning Region	190	Western Connecticut Council of Governments (WestCOG)	South Western CT MPO & Housatonic Valley MPO	Stamford	Francis Pickering	640,482	532.1 sq mi (1,378 km^{2})	State map highlighting Western Connecticut Planning Region

== U.S. Census Bureau ==
Comparison of county boundaries to planning regions

The United States Census Bureau formally recognized the planning regions/councils of government as county equivalents in the Federal Register on June 6, 2022. A draft notice of potential recognition would have adapted the existing FIPS codes for the eight "legacy counties", however in response to submitted comments, the bureau retired the codes and assigned new ones to more clearly illustrate the break in geographic continuity. The Census noted that there is substantial correlation between the historic county borders and planning regions, however planning regions may incorporate towns from several counties. The bureau notes that the recognition of planning regions as county equivalents was unique to the specific conditions in Connecticut, and would not constitute a binding precedent on similar conditions in other states.

== Defunct regions ==
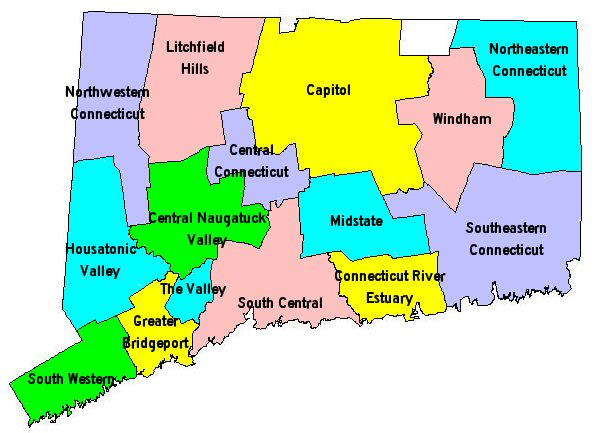
Regional Council of Governments of Connecticut as of 2013 (before consolidation)

These regional planning agencies existed prior to the realignment beginning in 2013:

1. Capitol Region Council of Governments (Hartford area)
2. Central Connecticut Regional Planning Agency (Bristol-New Britain area)
3. Connecticut River Estuary Regional Planning Agency (Old Saybrook area)
4. Council of Governments of the Central Naugatuck Valley (Waterbury area)
5. Greater Bridgeport Regional Council (Bridgeport area)
6. Housatonic Valley Council of Elected Officials (Danbury area)
7. Litchfield Hills Council of Elected Officials (Torrington area)
8. Midstate Regional Planning Agency (Middletown area)
9. Northeastern Connecticut Council of Governments (Danielson area)
10. Northwestern Connecticut Council of Governments (Warren area)
11. South Central Regional Council of Governments (New Haven area)
12. Southeastern Connecticut Council of Governments (Norwich-New London area)
13. South Western Regional Planning Agency (Stamford-Norwalk area)
14. Valley Council of Governments (Derby/Shelton area)
15. Windham Region Council of Governments (Willimantic area)

== Informal regions ==
Connecticut has a number of informal regions that have no governmental unit associated with them, although may generally correspond to a regional planning agency or council of government boundary.

- Greater Hartford (Hartford area)
- Central Connecticut (Bristol-New Britain area)
- Central Naugatuck Valley (Waterbury area)
- Greater Bridgeport (Bridgeport area)
- Greater Danbury (Danbury area)
- Litchfield Hills (Torrington area)
- Lower Connecticut River Valley (Old Saybrook area)
- Quiet Corner (Northeastern Connecticut/Danielson area)
- Northwest Corner (North Canaan area)
- Greater New Haven (New Haven area)
- Southeastern Connecticut (Norwich-New London area)
- Gold Coast (Stamford-Norwalk area)
- Lower Naugatuck Valley (Derby/Shelton area)
- Windham Region (Willimantic area)
