= Naugatuck Valley League =

American high school athletic conference

- Conference: CIAC
- Founded: 1930
- No. of teams: 15
- Region: New Haven County; Litchfield County

The Naugatuck Valley League (abbreviated NVL) is a 15-team athletic conference of high schools, located in the Naugatuck River Valley of Connecticut.

The NVL is a member of the Connecticut Interscholastic Athletic Conference (CIAC). It is the oldest high school athletic conference in Connecticut, claiming a continuous history that dates back to at least 1930.

== History ==
The Naugatuck Valley League (NVL), the oldest high school sports league in Connecticut, has a storied history of athletic competition dating back to its initial formation in 1918. The first attempt to establish a high school football league in the Naugatuck Valley featured teams such as Naugatuck, Torrington, Crosby, Meriden, and Bridgeport. Bridgeport claimed the inaugural championship that year, followed by Meriden winning the title in 1919. However, the departure of Naugatuck and Bridgeport led to the league’s dissolution after just two seasons.

Efforts to revive the league gained momentum in 1927, spearheaded by Jimmy Lee, the athletic director at Wilby High School. Lee envisioned a league that would include schools like Naugatuck, Ansonia, Torrington, Wilby, Crosby, Harding, and New Haven Commercial, competing in football, basketball, baseball, and track. Despite his efforts, the Connecticut Interscholastic Athletic Conference (CIAC) delayed its approval.

The current iteration of the NVL was officially established in 1930, marking a significant milestone in Connecticut high school sports. The founding members were Naugatuck High School, Ansonia High School, Torrington High School, Crosby High School, Wilby High School, Gilbert School, Harding High School, and Bridgeport Central High School. The league’s first official event, a basketball game, took place on December 19, 1930, between Crosby and Ansonia. Football competition began in 1931.

Over the decades, the NVL underwent numerous membership changes. In 1935, Torrington suspended its football program, leading to a temporary halt in league football activities. Football resumed in 1939 with Torrington and Ansonia reinstating their programs. During World War II, Harding High School left the league due to travel difficulties, and Leavenworth High School of Waterbury (later renamed Kennedy High School) joined as a replacement.

The mid-20th century saw gradual expansions, including the addition of Watertown High School, Sacred Heart, and Holy Cross High School. In the 1990s, the NVL grew further with the inclusion of Wolcott.

During the winter of 2009, the existing 12 member schools of the NVL voted in favor of admitting two new schools into the league: Derby High School, moving over from the SCC (Southern Connecticut Conference), and St. Paul Catholic High School of Bristol, which would have been forced to play independently upon the disbanding of the Northwest Conference. Both schools began league play in the fall of 2010.

In 2013, Oxford High School was approved to join the league. In 2015, the newly formed Waterbury Career Academy joined the NVL, bringing it to a membership of 16 schools. In February 2021, Sacred Heart High School announced that it would cease operations following the 2020-21 academic year, and thus left the league. The league currently sits at 15 teams.

== Divisions ==
Prior to the 2007–08 school year the NVL member schools' athletic directors agreed to split the league into two divisions: the Brass and the Copper. The goal of the new structure was to create more competition within the league and enhance each sport's postseason tournament. The names "Brass" and "Copper" were chosen because of Waterbury's history of being centers of brass and copper production.

On February 22, 2013, the Naugatuck Valley League approved the admittance of Oxford High School into their conference from the SWC (South West Conference.) With the move, the NVL announced on November 22, 2013, that the format of two divisions (Brass and Copper) would be realigned into three (Brass, Copper, and Iron).

=== Iron Division ===
School	Location	Nickname	Colors
Ansonia High School	Ansonia, Connecticut	Chargers	
Derby High School	Derby, Connecticut	Red Raiders	
Oxford High School	Oxford, Connecticut	Wolverines	
St. Paul Catholic High School	Bristol, Connecticut	Falcons	
Seymour High School	Seymour, Connecticut	Wildcats	

=== Brass Division ===
School	Location	Nickname	Colors
Crosby High School	Waterbury, Connecticut	Bulldogs	
Holy Cross High School	Waterbury, Connecticut	Crusaders	
Kennedy High School	Waterbury, Connecticut	Eagles	
Waterbury Career Academy	Waterbury, Connecticut	Spartans	
Wilby High School	Waterbury, Connecticut	Wildcats	

=== Copper Division ===
School	Location	Nickname	Colors
Naugatuck High School	Naugatuck, Connecticut	Greyhounds	
Torrington High School	Torrington, Connecticut	Raiders	
Watertown High School	Watertown, Connecticut	Warriors	
Wolcott High School	Wolcott, Connecticut	Eagles	
Woodland Regional High School	Beacon Falls, Connecticut	Hawks	

In boys' and girls' basketball, 20 games are played, two against each team within the same division, one each against non-division teams, and two non-league games.

== Sports ==
The NVL offers varsity sports in three seasons: fall, winter, and spring.

Fall sports

- Football
- Girls' volleyball
- Boys' soccer
- Girls' soccer
- Girls' swimming
- Boys' cross country
- Girls' cross country

Winter sports

- Boys' basketball
- Girls' basketball
- Boys' indoor track
- Girls' indoor track
- Boys' swimming
- Cheerleading
- Dance
- Weightlifting

Spring sports

- Baseball
- Softball
- Boys' outdoor track
- Girls' outdoor track
- Boys' tennis
- Girls' tennis
- Golf
