= Central Naugatuck Valley =

- The Central Naugatuck Valley Region of Connecticut
- Country: United States
- State: Connecticut
- County: New Haven
- County: Litchfield

Area
  - Total: 309.0 sq mi (800.3 km^{2})
- Highest elevation: 1,133 ft (345 m)
- Lowest elevation: 20 ft (6.1 m)

Population (2023)
  - Total: 456,128
  - Density: 1,476/sq mi (569.9/km^{2})
- Time zone: UTC-5 (Eastern)
  - Summer (DST): UTC-4 (Eastern)

The Central Naugatuck Valley is a region of Connecticut in New Haven and Litchfield counties located approximately 70 miles (110 km) northeast of New York City and 110 miles (180 km) southwest of Boston, United States. The region comprises 13 towns: Beacon Falls, Bethlehem, Cheshire, Middlebury, Naugatuck, Oxford, Prospect, Southbury, Thomaston, Waterbury, Watertown, Wolcott, and Woodbury.

== Geography ==
The Naugatuck River, which acts as the region's namesake, flows through the center of the region from Thomaston to Beacon Falls. The river begins at the confluence of Jakes Brook, Hart Brook, and Hall Meadow Brook in the western part of Torrington and flows 40 miles (64 km) before entering the Housatonic River in Derby. The Central Naugatuck Valley is one of three regions that comprises the Naugatuck River Valley, the others being the Lower Naugatuck Valley, also known as "The Valley", and the Upper Naugatuck Valley, which is part of the larger Litchfield Hills region.

== Demographics ==
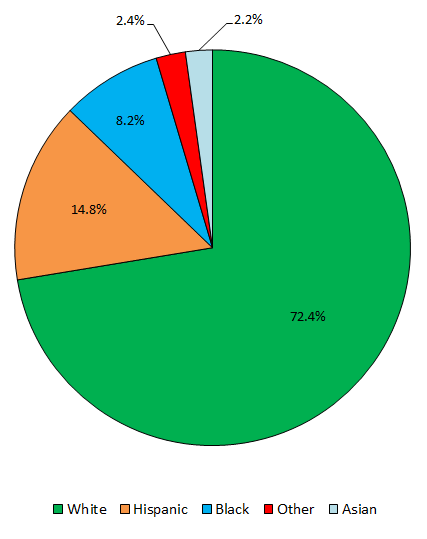
Racial and ethnic distribution in the Central Naugatuck Valley

In 2010, the total population of the Central Naugatuck Valley Region was 287,768, an increase of 15,174, or 5.6%, from 2000. The fastest growth occurred in the suburban towns of Oxford, Middlebury, and Beacon Falls, which each experienced a population growth of over 15%. Waterbury, with a population of 110,336, is the largest city in the region and fifth largest city in Connecticut. Naugatuck (31,862) and Cheshire (29,261), are the second and third largest municipalities in the region. Similar to state and national trends, the population of the Central Naugatuck Valley is becoming increasingly diverse. As of the 2010 U.S. Census, the racial makeup of the region was 79.4% White (72.4% non-Hispanic White), 9.2% Black or African American, 0.3% Native American, 2.2% Asian, 6.1% from other races, and 2.7% from two or more races. Hispanics or Latinos of any race were 14.8% of the region's population. Racial and ethnic minorities represented 20.6% of the region's population, a 34% increase from 2000. A vast majority (77%) of the region's minority population lives in Waterbury.

In 2010, there were 109,735 households in the region. 49.4% of households were made up of married couples living together, 26.4% were single-person households, 19.0% were headed by a single parent with no spouse present, and 5.2% were non-family households.

The median age for the region was 40.4 years old. 23.9% of the population was under the age of 18, 8.2% was 18 to 24 years old, 11.0% was 25 to 34 years old, 13.7% was 35 to 44 years old, 28.7% was 45 to 64 years old, and 14.5% who were 65 years of age or older.

Per capita income for the region was $30,779, which is below the state average of $36,755. Median household and median family income vary significantly from town to town. Waterbury, the poorest municipality in the region, had a median household income of $40,254 and a median family income of $47,077. On the contrary, Cheshire was the wealthiest municipality in the region with a median household income of $107,936 and a median family income of $123,539. About 10.6% of the population was below the poverty line.

The top 10 largest ancestry groups in the region are:

- 23.6% Italian
- 18.0% Irish
- 9.1% German
- 8.9% English
- 7.3% Polish
- 6.5% French
- 2.9% Portuguese
- 2.7% French Canadian
- 2.2% American
- 1.8% Lithuanian

== Economy ==
Historically, the economy of the Central Naugatuck Valley was dominated by the manufacturing sector. Large corporations such as Chase Brass and Copper Company, the American Brass Company, the United States Rubber Company (later renamed Uniroyal), and Timex all have their roots in the Central Naugatuck Valley. Like other manufacturing centers in New England, the Central Naugatuck Valley has been plagued by deindustrialization since the 1960s, as many manufacturers moved to the South and Midwest or abroad, where production was cheaper. Similar to national trends, the regional economy is becoming increasingly dominated by the service sector.

== Transportation ==
=== Highways ===
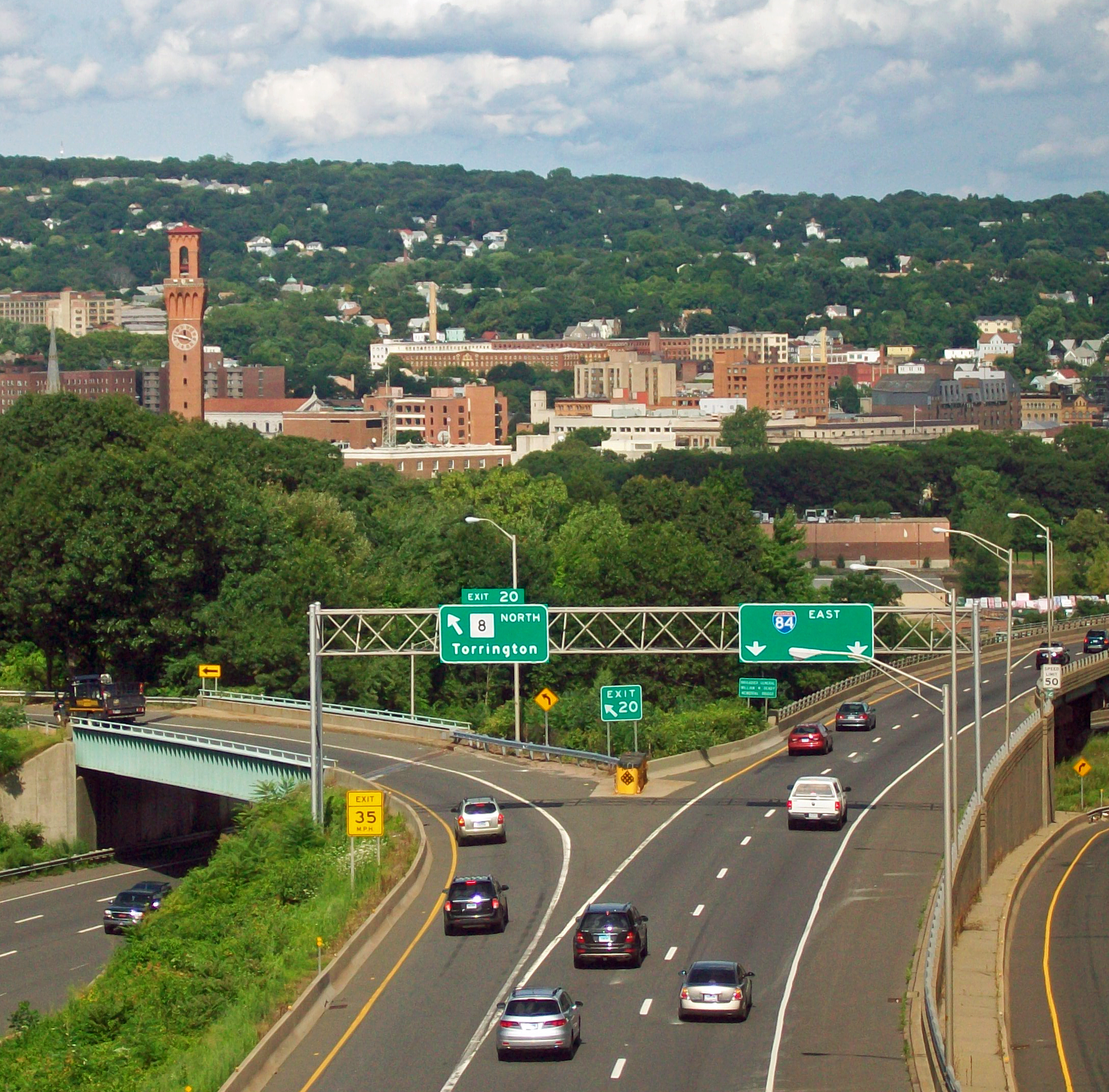
I-84, just west of downtown Waterbury

Interstate 84 and Route 8 serve as the primary highways in the region. Interstate 84 links the region with Hartford, and Boston to the east and Danbury, and New York State to the west. Route 8 is the major north-south highway in the region and connects with Torrington, and the Litchfield Hills to the north, and to the Lower Naugatuck Valley and Bridgeport to the south. A small segment of Interstate 691 is located in the town of Cheshire, and connects Interstate 84 to Interstate 91 and Connecticut Route 15.

=== Bus ===
Local bus service is provided by CT Transit through Northeast Transportation Company. Service is found primarily in Waterbury, and also extends into the neighboring towns of Cheshire, Middlebury, Naugatuck, Watertown, Wolcott. With the completion of the Hartford-New Britain Busway in 2014, a new express bus will run between Waterbury and Hartford. Peter Pan Bus Lines operates intercity buses out of Waterbury.

=== Rail ===
The Waterbury Branch of the Metro-North Railroad contains stations at Waterbury, Naugatuck, and Beacon Falls. The Railroad Museum of New England runs seasonal excursion trains on the Naugatuck Railroad from Thomaston to Waterbury and Torrington.

=== Air ===
Waterbury-Oxford Airport, located in the town of Oxford, offers facilities for corporate, freight and recreational flights. As of 2010, the airport handled 137 aircraft operations per day.

== Government ==
Like all Connecticut towns, the towns in the Central Naugatuck Valley have strong home rule tradition. Although Connecticut is divided up into eight counties, these counties do not have a formal governments and lack administrative power over member towns. In its place, Connecticut is divided up into 9 planning regions who are responsible for regional transportation and land-use planning. The Naugatuck Valley Council of Governments (NVCOG) is the metropolitan planning organization for the region and acts as a forum where chief elected officials can discuss issues of common concern and to develop programs to address them on a regional level, such as transportation infrastructure, housing, and regional sustainability.

== Points of interest ==
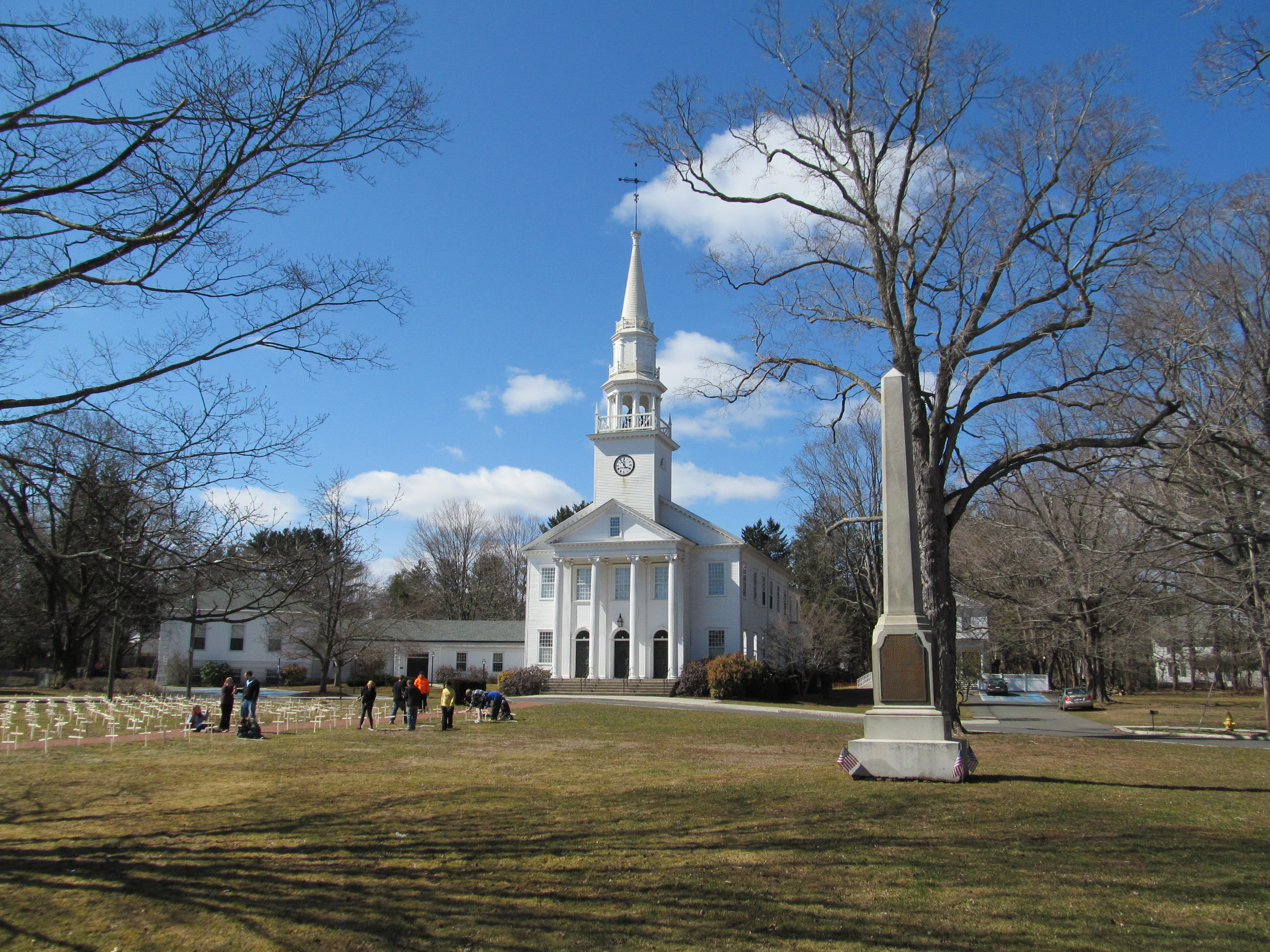
First Congregational Church of Cheshire

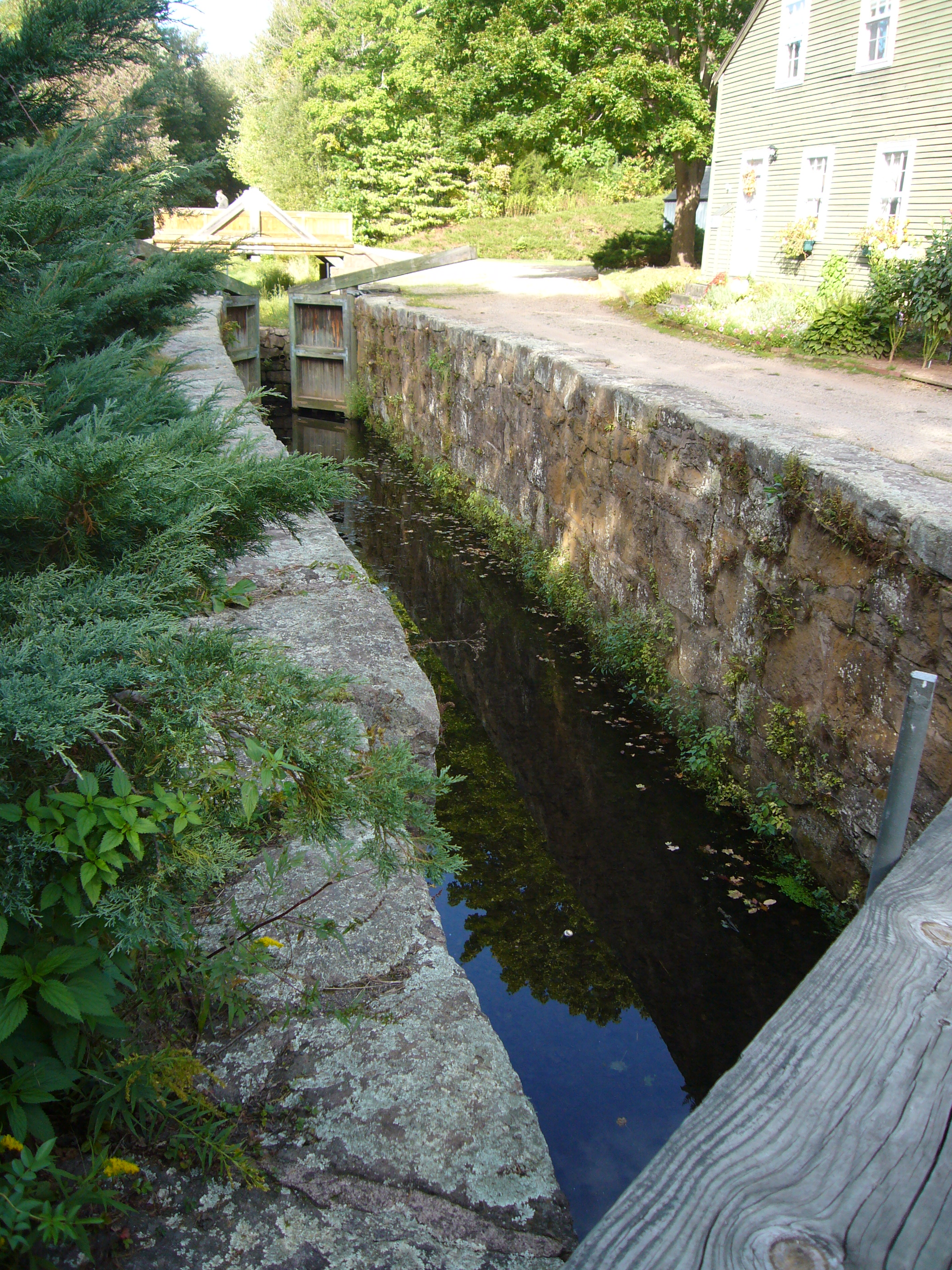
Lock 12 on the Farmington Canal Trail

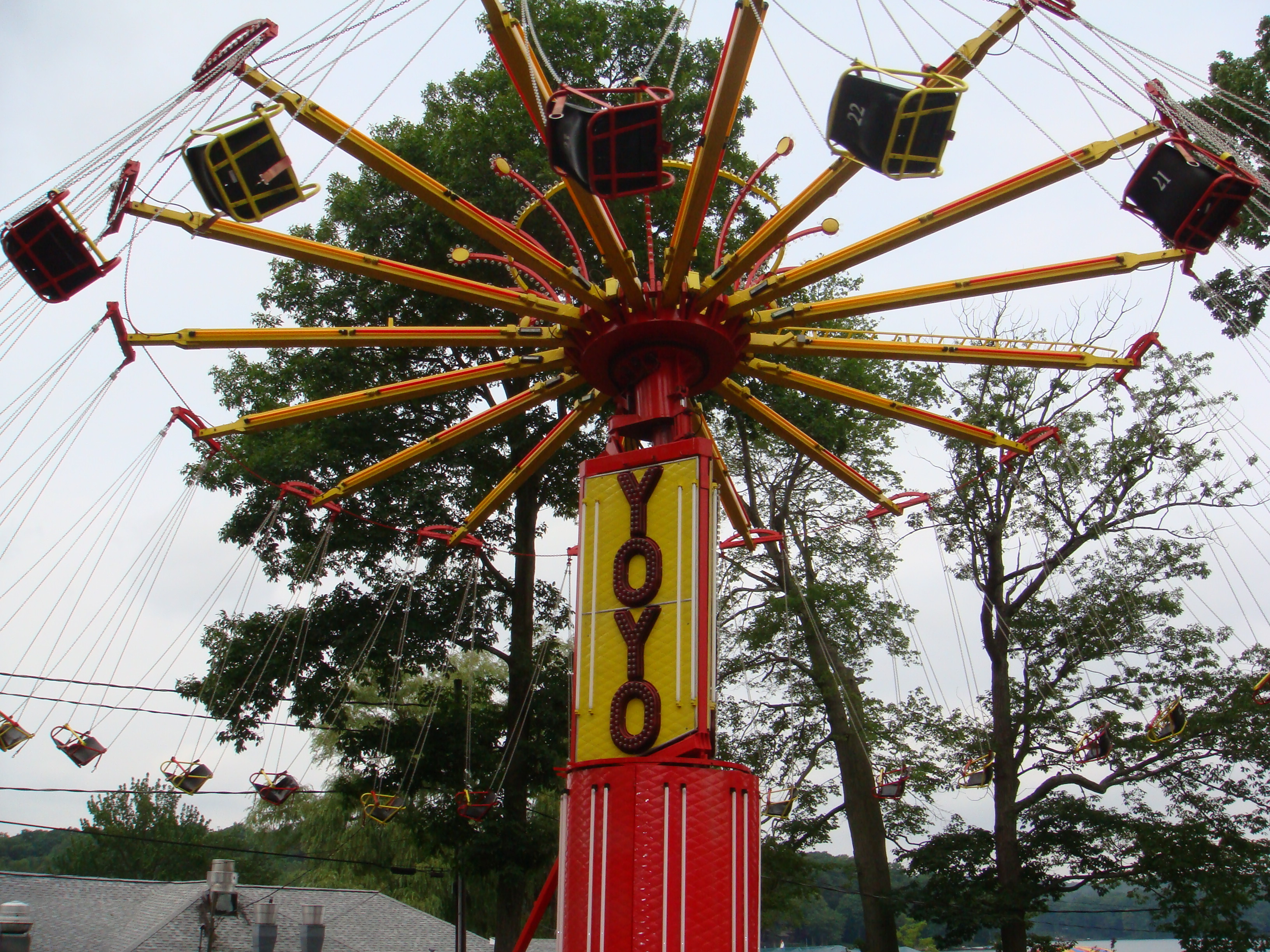
Quassy Park, Middlebury

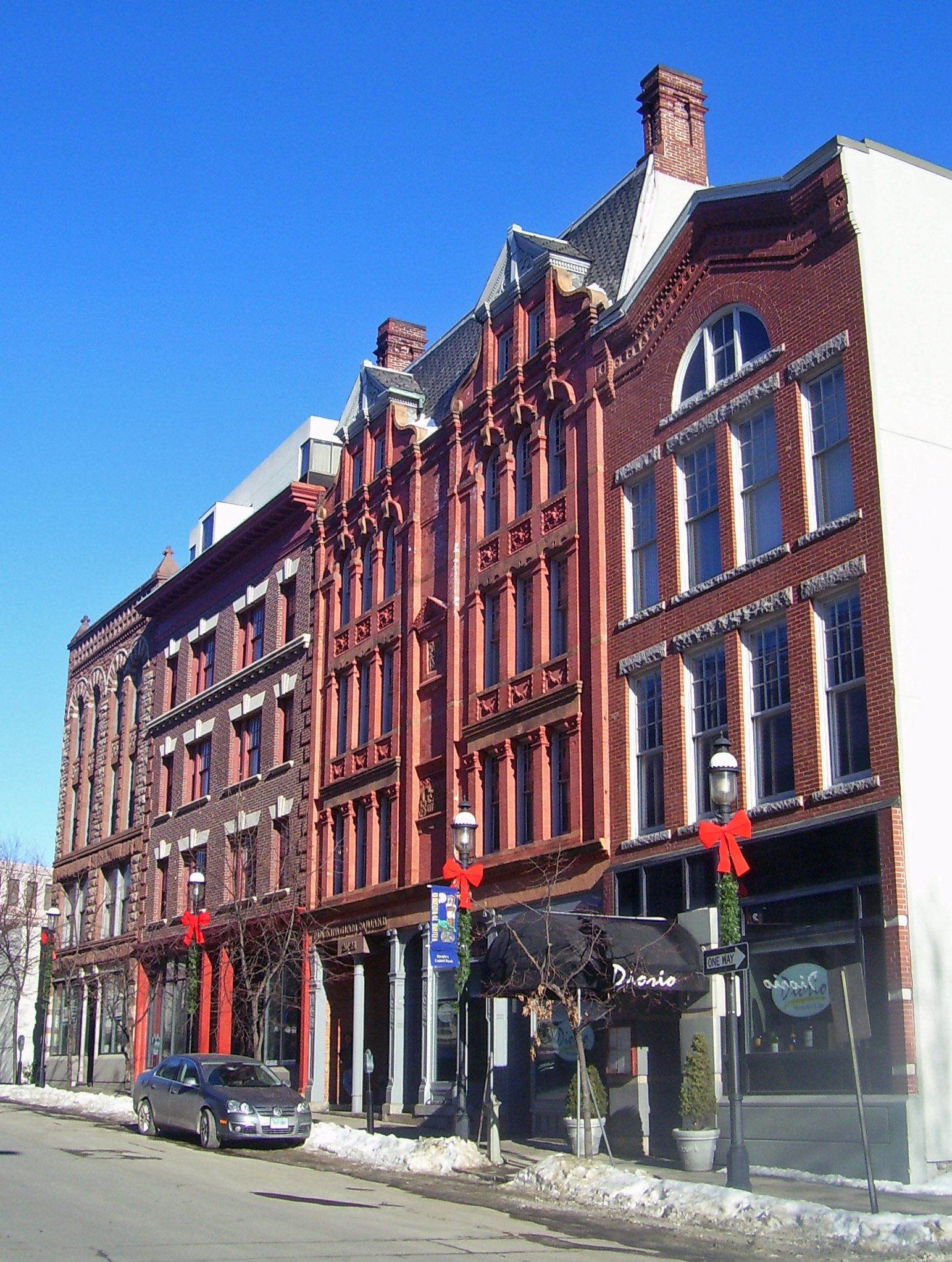
Downtown Waterbury

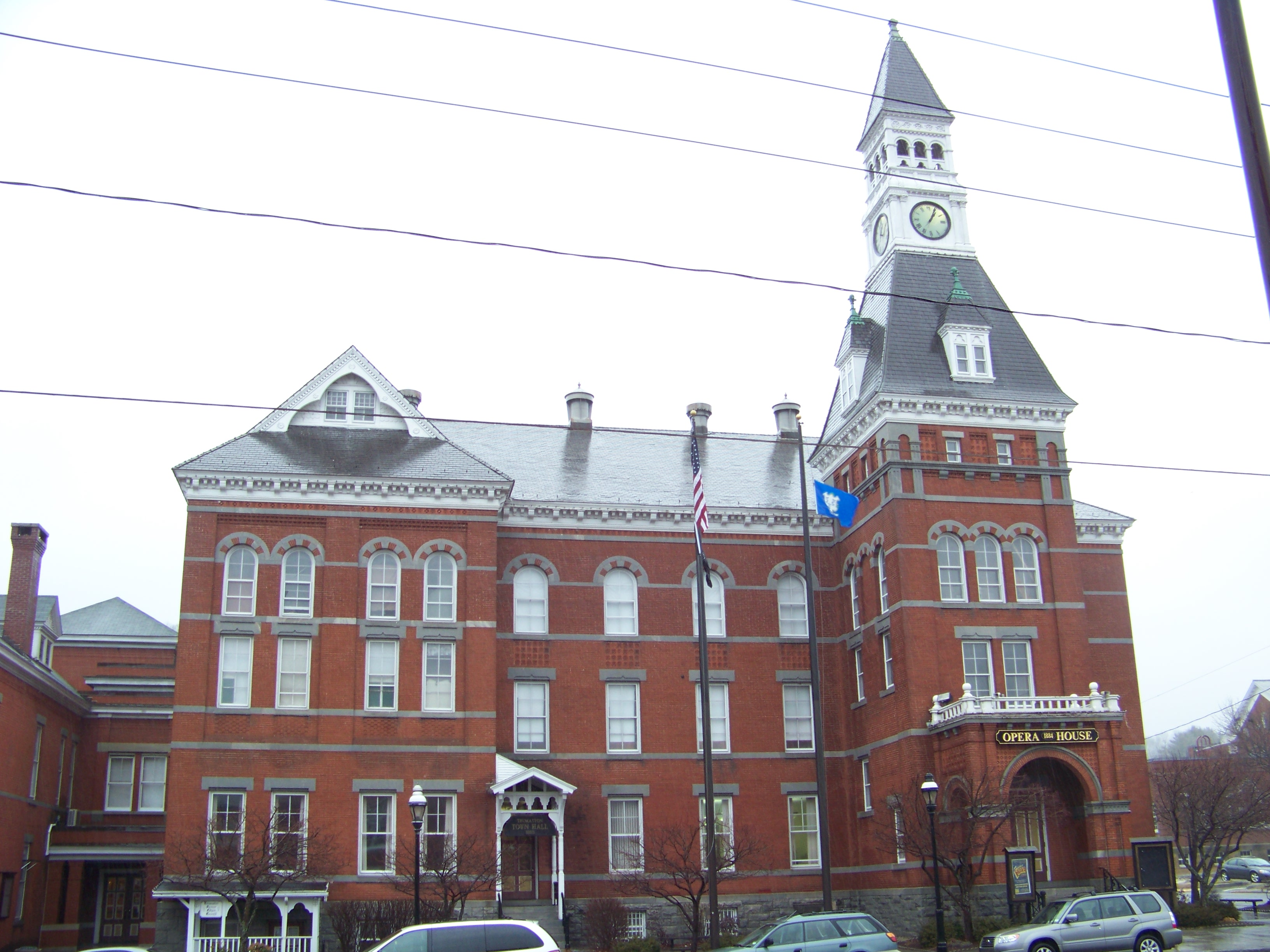
Thomaston Opera House

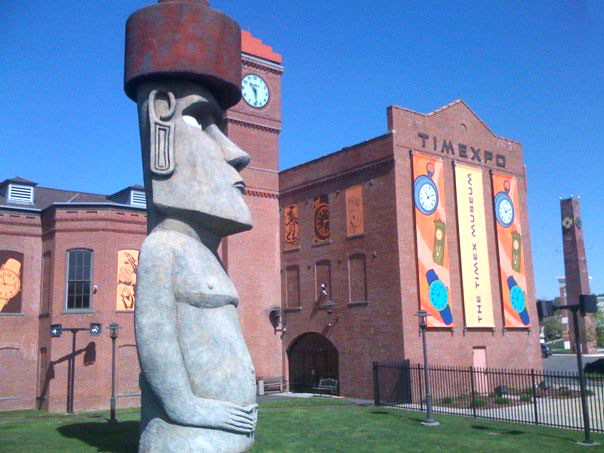
Timexpo Museum, Waterbury

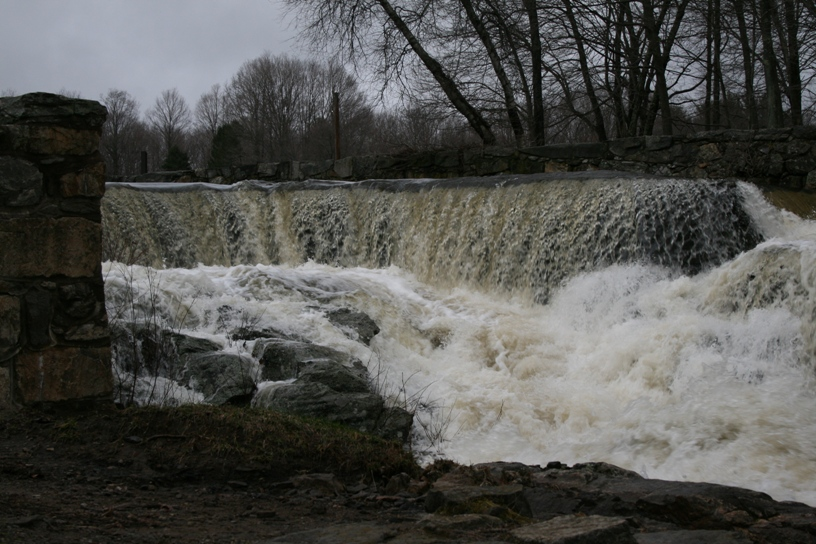
Southford Falls, Southbury

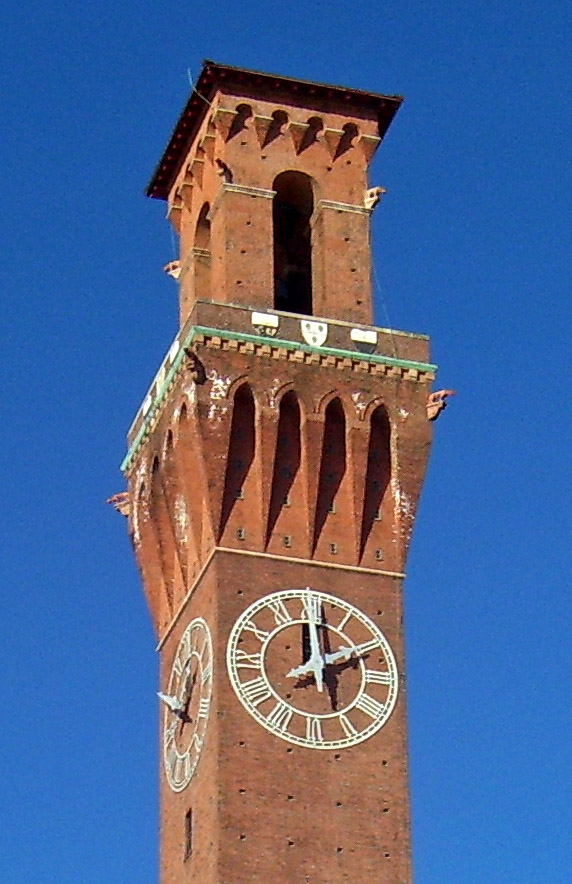
Waterbury Union Station clocktower

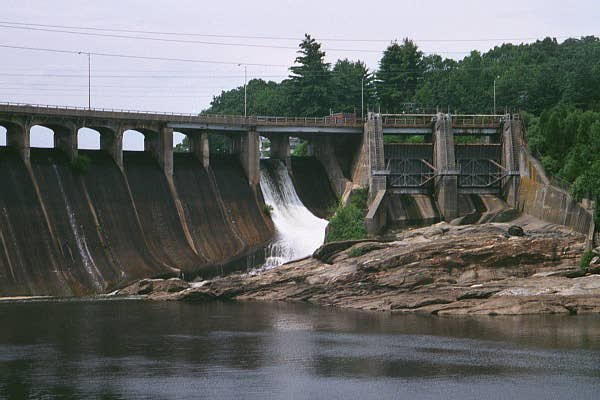
Stevenson Dam, Oxford

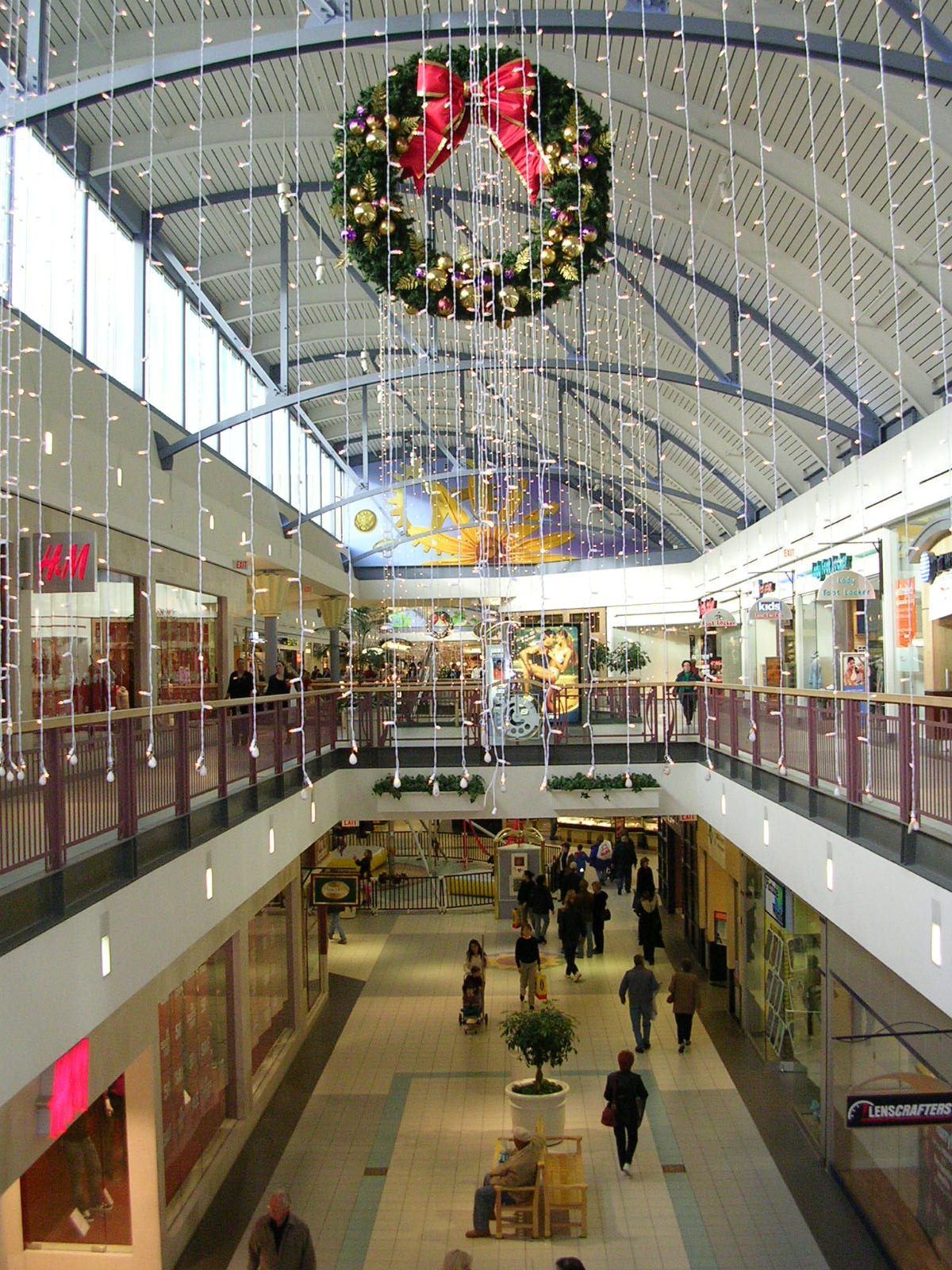
Brass Mill Center, Waterbury
