= Naugatuck River Valley =

Area in western Connecticut, US

The Naugatuck River Valley is the watershed area of the Naugatuck River in the western part of Connecticut. The Naugatuck Valley straddles parts of Litchfield County, New Haven, and Fairfield counties. The Route 8 corridor and Waterbury Branch of the Metro-North railroad line run along the river valley. Geographically, it comprises the municipalities located within the Naugatuck River basin. During the 19th and 20th centuries, the area was one of the main manufacturing centers in New England, and most of the communities around the river were emblematic New England mill towns.

== Subdivisions ==
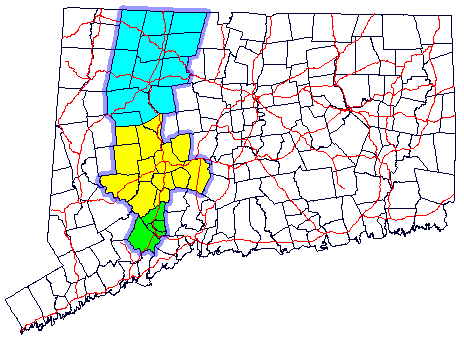
Map of Connecticut showing the regions of the Naugatuck River Valley. Green is the Valley, yellow is the Greater Waterbury area, and blue is the Litchfield Hills region.

Traditionally, the Naugatuck Valley is often subdivided for historical, cultural, geographic, and demographic reasons.

- The Upper Naugatuck Valley, more often referred to as the Litchfield (Northwest) Hills, refers to the area centered on the city of Torrington. The West Branch and East Branch Naugatuck Rivers merge in Torrington to form the main river. The watershed area in the Upper Naugatuck Valley includes parts of the towns of Goshen, Harwinton, Litchfield, Morris, New Hartford, Norfolk, Torrington, Winchester.
- The Central Naugatuck Valley, more often referred to as the Greater Waterbury area, is the region focused on the city of Waterbury. The towns covered in part by the watershed area are Thomaston, Plymouth, Bristol, Bethlehem, Watertown, Woodbury, Wolcott, Waterbury, Middlebury, Cheshire, Prospect, and Naugatuck, Beacon Falls, and Oxford. The last three towns are sometimes also grouped with the lower valley region.
- The Lower Naugatuck Valley refers to the area focused on the city of Derby. The towns within the watershed area of the lower valley are Shelton, Seymour, Woodbridge, Ansonia, and Derby. The towns of Beacon Falls, Oxford, and Naugatuck, usually grouped together in the central valley region, are also sometimes assigned to the lower valley region.

== Towns and cities ==
The following municipalities are members of the Naugatuck Valley Council of Governments (NVCOG):

- Ansonia
- Beacon Falls
- Bethlehem
- Bristol
- Cheshire
- Derby
- Middlebury
- Naugatuck
- Oxford
- Plymouth
- Prospect
- Seymour
- Shelton
- Southbury
- Thomaston
- Waterbury
- Watertown
- Wolcott
- Woodbury

== See also ==
- Naugatuck Railroad
