= Byron Jones (American football) =

American football player (born 1992)

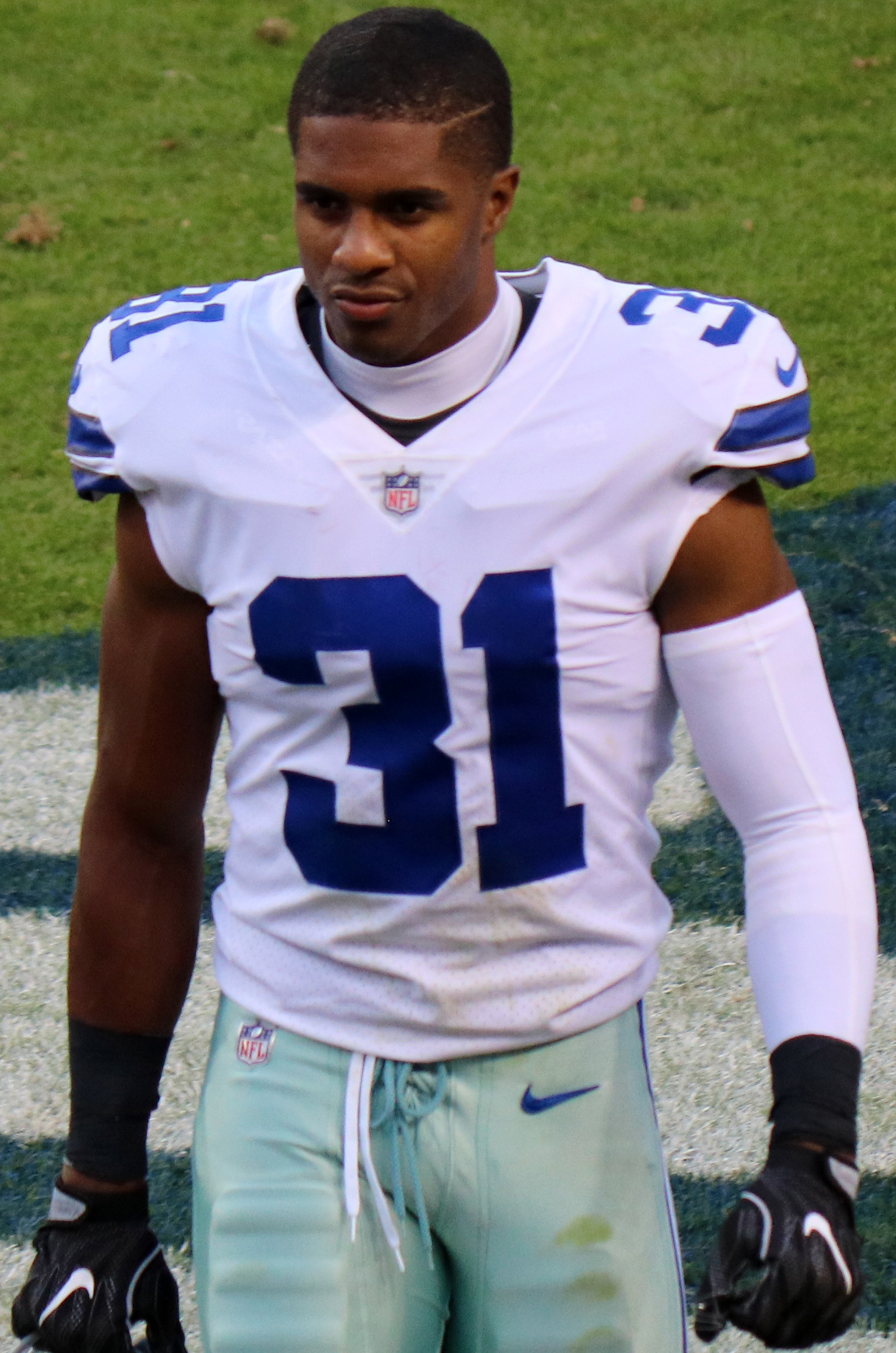
- Jones with the Dallas Cowboys in 2017

No. 31, 24
- Position: Cornerback

Personal information
- Born: September 26, 1992 (age 34); New Britain, Connecticut, U.S.
- Listed height: 6 ft 1 in (1.85 m)
- Listed weight: 194 lb (88 kg)

Career information
- High school: St. Paul Catholic (Bristol, Connecticut)
- College: Connecticut (2010–2014)
- NFL draft: 2015: 1st round, 27th overall pick

Career history
- Dallas Cowboys (2015–2019); Miami Dolphins (2020–2022)

Awards and highlights
- Second-team All-Pro (2018); Pro Bowl (2018)

Career NFL statistics
- Total tackles: 444
- Forced fumbles: 5
- Pass deflections: 57
- Interceptions: 4
- Defensive touchdowns: 1
- Stats at Pro Football Reference

Byron Philip Jones (born September 26, 1992) is an American former professional football player who was a cornerback in the National Football League (NFL). He played college football for the UConn Huskies, and was selected by the Dallas Cowboys in the first round of the 2015 NFL draft after a stellar combine performance. He holds the unofficial world record for the standing long jump at 12 feet 3 inches (3.73 meters). He played five seasons for the Cowboys, where he was once named Second-team All-Pro and made the Pro Bowl. A free agent after his fifth season, Jones signed a five-year, $82 million contract with the Miami Dolphins, making him the highest-paid cornerback in the NFL at the time.

== Early life ==
Jones attended St. Paul Catholic High School in Bristol, Connecticut and played for Jude Kelly. He was a gifted track & field athlete, and was one of the state's top performers in the 200m and 400m. At the 2010 NVL Outdoor T&F Championships, he earned first-place finishes in both the 200-meter dash (22.13s) and 400-meter dash (48.43s).

In football, he received Class MM All-State and All-Naugatuck Valley honors as a senior and team captain. He was considered a two-star recruit by Rivals.com. He also played basketball.

== College career ==
Jones accepted a scholarship from the University of Connecticut Huskies. As a redshirt freshman, he started 2 games at cornerback and six of the final seven games at safety. He recorded 51 tackles (sixth on the team), one fumble recovery, 2 interceptions and 4 passes defensed. He returned a fumble for a game-winning touchdown against the University of South Florida.

As a sophomore, he started 12 games at safety, tallying 88 tackles (third on the team), one interception and 2 passes defensed. The next year, he was switched to cornerback, starting 11-of-12 games, while registering 60 tackles (fourth on the team), 3 interceptions and 8 passes defensed.

Jones started 7 games at cornerback as a senior, posting 24 tackles, 2 interceptions and 4 passes defensed. He had a 70-yard interception return against the University of South Florida in what ESPN announcers called "what might be the UConn play of the year". He missed the rest of the season after undergoing surgery for a shoulder injury suffered in a loss against East Carolina University. He finished his college career with 223 total tackles, 8 interceptions and 2 touchdowns.

== Professional career ==
=== Pre-draft ===
Prior to the NFL Scouting Combine, Jones was ranked the 25th best cornerback prospect in the draft by NFL.com. He was one of 54 defensive backs to receive an invitation to the NFL combine. At the NFL combine, he set a new combine and world record for standing broad jump by leaping 12 feet, 3 inches (3.73m), surpassing Jamie Collins's old record of 11 feet, 7 inches (3.53m) set in 2013. He was limited to the bench press, vertical jump, broad jump, short shuttle, and three-cone drill. Jones also finished first of all combine participants in the vertical leap. His combine performance gave him an immediate rise up draft boards and made him a top defensive back prospect.

On March 31, 2015, Jones attended UConn's pro day, along with Deshon Foxx, Geremy Davis, B. J. McBryde, and five others. He completed his combine drills and ran positional drills run by Minnesota Vikings head coach Mike Zimmer. Zimmer was one of the team representatives and scouts from 29 NFL teams who attended his pro day, along with Philadelphia Eagles head coach Chip Kelly. Jones had private workouts and visits with the Buffalo Bills, Philadelphia Eagles, Chicago Bears, and San Francisco 49ers. At the conclusion of the pre-draft process, Jones was projected to be a first round pick by NFL draft experts and scouts. He was ranked as the third best cornerback prospect in the draft by NFLDraftScout.com, was ranked the seventh best cornerback by NFL analyst Mike Mayock, and was ranked the seventh best cornerback in the draft by Sports Illustrated.

External videos
- Byron Jones' combine workout
- Byron Jones' world record broad jump

Pre-draft measurables
Height	Weight	Arm length	Hand span	Wingspan	40-yard dash	10-yard split	20-yard split	20-yard shuttle	Three-cone drill	Vertical jump	Broad jump	Bench press	Wonderlic
6 ft 0 5/8 in (1.84 m)	199 lb (90 kg)	32 in (0.81 m)	10 in (0.25 m)	6 ft 4 1/2 in (1.94 m)	4.43 s	1.50 s	2.52 s	3.94 s	6.78 s	44.5 in (1.13 m)	12 ft 3 in (3.73 m)	18 reps	33
All values from NFL Combine/UConn's Pro Day

=== Dallas Cowboys ===
==== 2015 season ====
The Dallas Cowboys selected Jones in the first round (27th overall) of the 2015 NFL draft. He was the fourth cornerback selected in 2015. On June 11, 2015, the Cowboys signed Jones to a four-year, $8.60 million contract that included $6.93 million guaranteed and a signing bonus of $6.51 million.

External videos
- Dallas Cowboys select Byron Jones

Throughout training camp, Jones competed for a job as a starting cornerback, against Morris Claiborne and Tyler Patmon, after Orlando Scandrick tore his MCL and ACL. Head coach Jason Garrett named Jones the backup cornerback behind Brandon Carr and Morris Claiborne.

He made his professional regular season debut in the Cowboys' season-opener against the New York Giants and made his first career tackle on Eli Manning during their 27–26 victory. On October 25, 2015, Jones recorded a season-high seven combined tackles and two pass deflections in the Cowboys' 27–20 loss at the Giants. On November 1, 2015, Jones earned his first career start at free safety in place of J. J. Wilcox. He made three combined tackles and a pass deflection in their 13–12 loss to the Seattle Seahawks. In Week 11, Jones earned his first start at cornerback after Morris Claiborne sustained a hamstring injury and missed two consecutive games (Weeks 11–13). He finished the Cowboys' 24–14 victory at the Miami Dolphins with three solo tackles and had difficulties in pass coverage after giving a 47-yard touchdown reception to Jarvis Landry and a 29-yard touchdown reception to Kenny Stills. He finished his rookie season with 67 combined tackles (47 solo) and nine pass deflections in 16 games and 11 starts. Jones started the final ten games of the season, with three starts at safety and four at cornerback and nickelback.

==== 2016 season ====
Jones entered training camp as the favorite to start at free safety and competed with Wilcox. Defensive coordinator Rod Marinelli opted to name him as the starting free safety to start the regular season, alongside strong safety Barry Church.

In Week 10, Jones recorded a season-high 12 combined tackles (11 solo) during a 35–30 victory at the Pittsburgh Steelers. On December 18, 2016, he made seven combined tackles, broke up two passes, and recorded his first career interception off a pass by quarterback Jameis Winston in the Cowboys' 26–20 win against the Tampa Bay Buccaneers. Jones finished the 2016 season with 88 combined tackles (73 solo), ten pass deflections, and an interception in 16 games and 16 starts. Pro Football Focus gave Jones an overall grade of 83.4 in 2016.

The Cowboys finished first in the NFC East with a 13–3 record and a first round bye. On January 15, 2017, Jones started his first career playoff game and recorded five solo tackles and deflected two passes in a 34–31 loss at the Green Bay Packers in the NFC Divisional round.

He posted 16 starts, 102 tackles (fourth on the team), 10 passes defensed, one forced fumble and his first career interception.

==== 2017 season ====
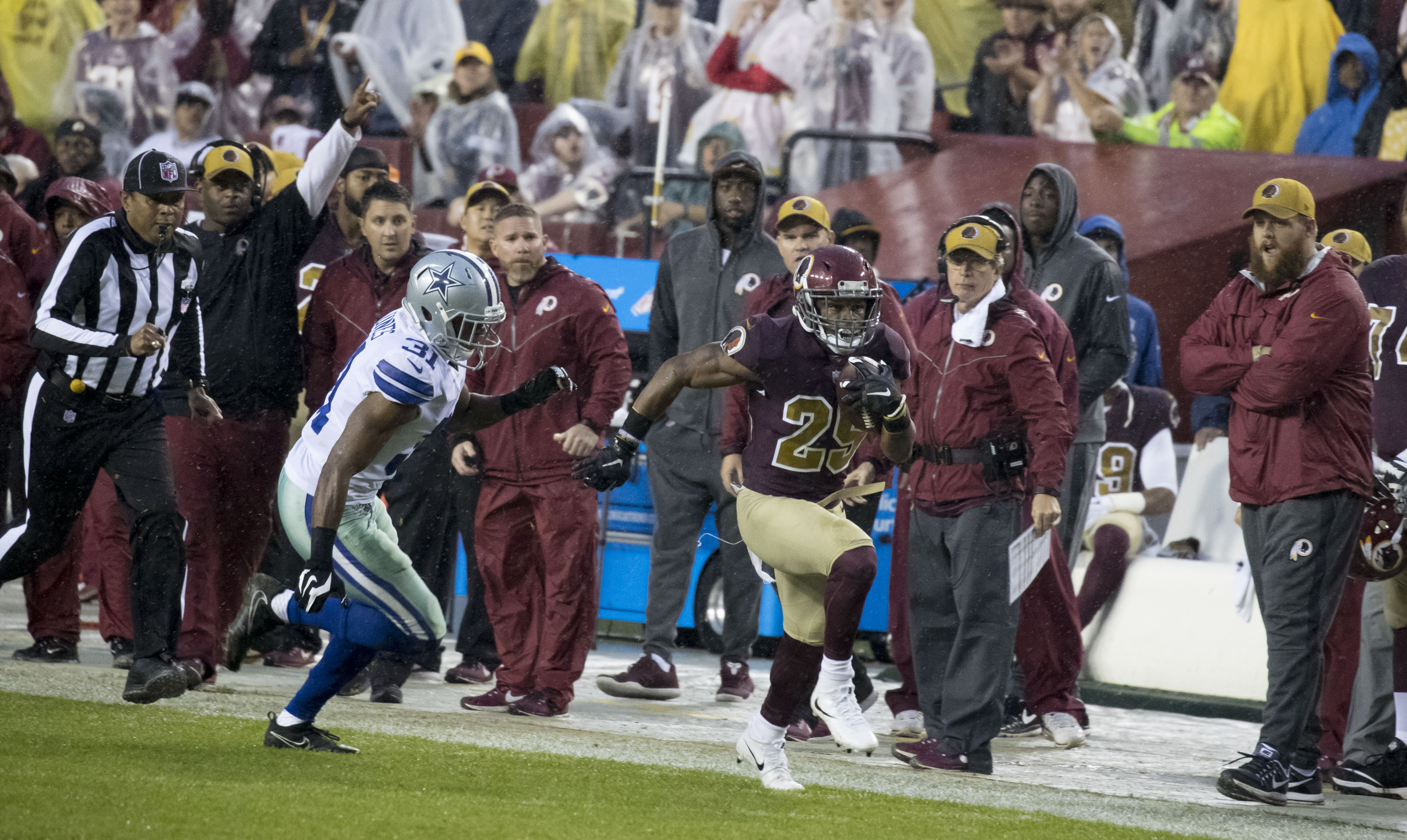
Jones chases Chris Thompson in a game against the Washington Redskins

Jones remained the starting free safety to begin the 2017 regular season, alongside strong safety Jeff Heath. In Week 4, he recorded a season-high seven solo tackles in the Cowboys' 35–30 loss against the Los Angeles Rams.

On October 29, 2017, he made five combined tackles, broke up a pass, and returned an interception by Kirk Cousins for a 21-yard touchdown in a 33–19 victory at the Washington Redskins. On December 10, 2017, Jones collected a season-high nine combined tackles during a 30–10 win at the Giants.

He finished the season with 16 starts, 74 tackles (4 for loss), five pass deflections, an interception, a touchdown and led the team with 11 special teams tackles. Pro Football Focus gave Jones an overall grade of 76.8, which ranked 54th among all qualifying safeties.

==== 2018 season ====
In the offseason, Jones announced that he would be switching from free safety back to cornerback. On April 22, 2018, the Cowboys picked up the fifth-year option on Jones' contract.

He started all 16 games, registering 76 tackles (2 for loss) 14 passes defensed (career-high), no interceptions and 2 special teams tackles. He was ranked the fifth-best corner in the league by Pro Football Focus and was elected to his first career Pro Bowl.

==== 2019 season ====
Jones had offseason hip surgery, which caused him to miss the offseason program and training camp. He started 14 of the 15 games in which he appeared at right cornerback. He missed the season finale because of an ankle injury suffered in practice.

He posted 45 tackles, 6 passes defensed, one forced fumble and 2 special teams tackles. Although he did not record an interception, he only gave up 3 touchdowns and quarterbacks completed just 53% of their passes directed at him.

=== Miami Dolphins ===
==== 2020 season ====
On March 21, 2020, Jones signed a five-year, $82 million contract with the Dolphins, making him at the time the highest-paid cornerback in the NFL. He was paired up with Xavien Howard, giving the Dolphins the two highest-paid corners in the NFL at the time.

In Week 14 against the Kansas City Chiefs, Jones forced a fumble on Mecole Hardman that was recovered by the Dolphins and intercepted a pass thrown by Patrick Mahomes during the 33–27 loss. This was Jones' first interception since the 2017 season.

In Week 17 against the Buffalo Bills, Jones recorded his career high second interception of the season off a pass thrown by Josh Allen during the 56–26 loss.

He finished with 14 starts at left cornerback, 37 tackles, 2 interceptions, 4 passes defensed and one forced fumble. He was declared inactive in 2 games against the Jacksonville Jaguars and the Seattle Seahawks.

==== 2021 season ====
Jones dealt with a quad injury and an Achilles injury during the season. He was declared inactive for one game against the Atlanta Falcons. He totaled 16 starts at left cornerback, 58 tackles, 10 passes defensed and one forced fumble.

==== 2022 season ====
On July 21, 2022, Jones was placed on the reserve/PUP list at the start of training camp, but ultimately missed the entire season while recovering from a left Achilles surgery performed in March.

On February 25, 2023, he wrote on Twitter: "Today I can't run or jump because of my injuries sustained playing this game. DO NOT take the pills they give you. DO NOT take the injections they give you. If you absolutely must, consult an outside doctor to learn the long-term implications". On March 15, 2023, the Dolphins designated Jones for release after he failed a physical exam, citing salary cap reasons.

== NFL career statistics ==
Legend
**Bold**	Career high

=== Regular season ===
Year	Team	Games		Tackles				Interceptions						Fumbles	
Year	Team	GP	GS	Cmb	Solo	Ast	Sck	PD	Int	Yds	Avg	Lng	TD	FF	FR
2015	DAL	16	11	66	47	19	0.0	8	0	0	0.0	0	0	0	0
2016	DAL	16	16	**88**	**73**	15	0.0	10	1	7	7.0	7	0	**1**	0
2017	DAL	16	16	82	48	**25**	0.0	5	1	**21**	**21.0**	**21**	**1**	**1**	0
2018	DAL	16	16	67	56	11	0.0	**14**	0	0	0.0	0	0	0	0
2019	DAL	15	14	46	37	9	0.0	6	0	0	0.0	0	0	**1**	0
2020	MIA	14	14	37	28	9	0.0	4	**2**	15	7.5	15	0	**1**	0
2021	MIA	16	16	58	47	11	0.0	10	0	0	0.0	0	0	**1**	0
2022	MIA	0	0	Did not play due to injury											
Career		109	103	444	345	99	0.0	57	4	43	10.8	21	1	5	0
