= Rico Brogna =

American baseball player (born 1970)

- First baseman
- Born: April 18, 1970 (age 54); Turners Falls, Massachusetts, U.S.
- Batted: Left Threw: Left

MLB debut
- August 8, 1992, for the Detroit Tigers

Last MLB appearance
- July 16, 2001, for the Atlanta Braves

MLB statistics
- Batting average: .269
- Home runs: 106
- Runs batted in: 458
- Stats at Baseball Reference

Teams
- Detroit Tigers (1992); New York Mets (1994–1996); Philadelphia Phillies (1997–2000); Boston Red Sox (2000); Atlanta Braves (2001)

Rico Joseph Brogna (born April 18, 1970) is an American former professional baseball first baseman and coach who played in Major League Baseball (MLB) for the Detroit Tigers, New York Mets, Philadelphia Phillies, Boston Red Sox, and Atlanta Braves over nine seasons (1992, 1994–2001). Brogna was drafted in the first round (26th overall) by the Tigers, in 1988.

Brogna spent time at Taft School where his parents taught. Brogna attended Watertown High School in Watertown, Connecticut, where he played baseball, basketball and football. He was named to the All-State team as a quarterback and won the state championship in 1986. Brogna initially signed a letter of intent to play quarterback at Clemson University, but instead chose to pursue a career in baseball.

== Playing career ==
On April 26, 1995, Brogna hit the first-ever home run at the Colorado Rockies’ new stadium, Coors Field, on its opening day. He was diagnosed with ankylosing spondylitis, a form of spinal arthritis, in 1991, and had to take medication for the condition on a daily basis. Concerns surrounding Brogna’s condition contributed to the decision of the Mets to trade him to the Phillies, following the 1996 season, but he recovered sufficiently to be an offensive contributor for several seasons, thereafter. Brogna became national spokesperson for the Spondylitis Association of America.

In 1998, Brogna recorded a career-high 104 RBIs and led the National League with 10 sacrifice flies. In 1999, Brogna hit a career high 24 home runs, for the Phillies. He retired as a baseball player, in July 2001.

== Coaching career ==
In 2006, Brogna managed the Post University baseball team. The Eagles finished with a record of 13-40 overall and 6-19 in Central Atlantic Collegiate Conference play. He coached the Watertown High School boys basketball team from 2006 to 2009. Overall, in Watertown, Connecticut, his win–loss record was 10–41. He coached for the Nonnewaug Chiefs, a high school football team in Woodbury, Connecticut. Soon after the conclusion of the 2008 football season, Brogna resigned as coach of the Chiefs and took a volunteer job as wide receivers coach for the Wesleyan University football team. In 2010, Brogna managed the Mobile BayBears, the Arizona Diamondbacks’ Double-A Minor League Baseball (MILB) affiliate. In 2011, he was named the head football coach at Notre Dame-Fairfield high school in Connecticut, and stated he had retired from baseball (as a coach/executive) to concentrate on his football duties year-round. Brogna resigned as head football coach, in 2012, following a 1-9 record, in his only season, and took a scouting job with the Tampa Bay Rays. In 2013, Brogna returned to the Watertown High School gridiron as the special teams and defensive line coach. After the 2013 season, he was hired as special assistant to Jerry Dipoto, general manager of the Los Angeles Angels of Anaheim. In August 2014, Brogna was named the Angels’ player-information coach. He "felt a growth" during spring training in 2015, which was later diagnosed as testicular cancer. Five days after being notified of his condition (May 13), Brogna underwent surgery.

In December 2017, Brogna was hired as a coach of the Reading Fightin' Phils, the minor-league AA team in the Philadelphia Phillies’ farm system, where he stayed for two seasons. In 2021, Brogna was the hitting coach of the Stockton Ports, the low-A affiliate of the Oakland Athletics.

== Personal life ==
Brogna married Melissa Shuhart, whom he had met in high school, in 1992. They have two children, Alexa Grace and Hunter. He is the namesake of the New York Mets-focused Rico Brogna Podcast, hosted by WFAN personality Evan Roberts.
