= Naugatuck High School =

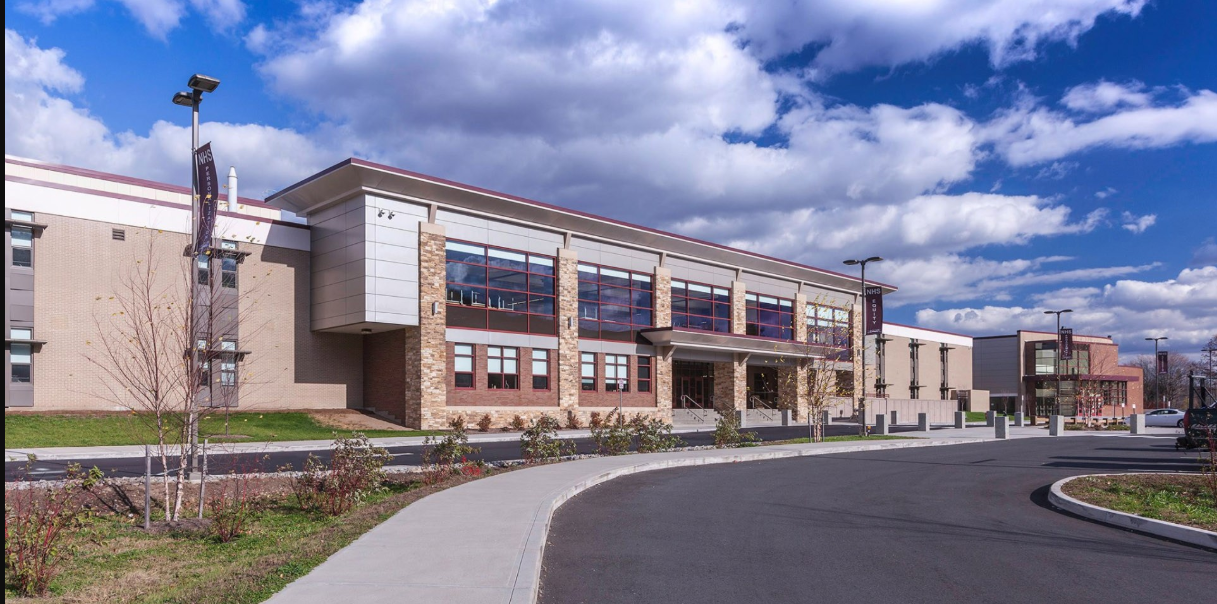

Location
- 543 Rubber Avenue; Naugatuck, Connecticut 06770; United States
- Coordinates: 41°29′28″N 73°04′29″W

Information
- Type: Public high school
- Founded: 1905 (121 years ago)
- CEEB code: 070440
- Principal: John Harris
- Teaching staff: 77.90 (FTE) (2023–2024)
- Grades: 9–12
- Enrollment: 1,272 (2023–2024)
- Student to teacher ratio: 16.33 (2023–2024)
- Colors: Garnet and Gray
- Athletics conference: Naugatuck Valley League (CIAC)
- Rival: Ansonia; Woodland Regional
- Newspaper: The Greyhound
- Website: nhs.naugatuck.k12.ct.us

Naugatuck High School is a public high school in Naugatuck, Connecticut, United States, serving grades 9–12. It competes athletically in the Naugatuck Valley League.

== History and campus ==
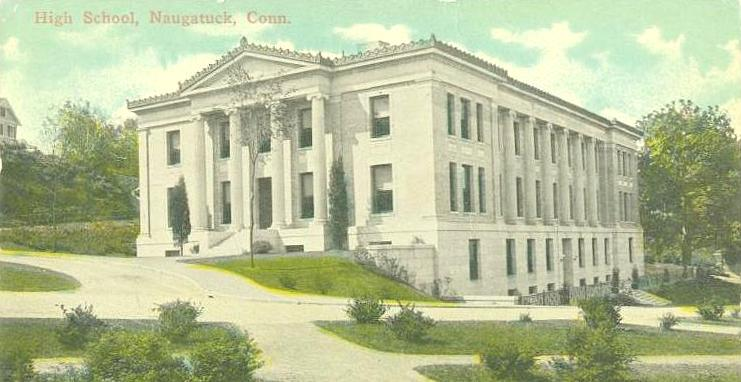
Original Naugatuck High School (c. 1910)

The original Naugatuck High School building on Hillside Avenue (now Hillside Intermediate School) was designed by McKim, Mead, and White and opened in 1906. Commissioned by industrialist John Howard Whittemore, it is noted for its Classical Revival design and three ground-level entrances on different elevations.

A new campus at 543 Rubber Avenue opened in 1959. Additions in the 1970s created three wings—Castle House, Goodyear House, and the Applied Education Wing (shops)—while the main building became known as Judd House. Following later renovations, the campus was reconfigured into North (former Judd), South (former Castle and Goodyear), East (Applied Education), and West (gyms and pool).

In 2009, the school installed rooftop solar panels; related roof work later necessitated a replacement project a decade on. A comprehensive “renovate-as-new” project began in 2013 and was substantially completed in 2015, modernizing interiors, exteriors, and technology.

== Athletics ==
Naugatuck sponsors boys’ and girls’ teams in soccer, cross country, swimming, basketball, indoor and outdoor track and field, tennis, golf, baseball/softball, football, volleyball, and wrestling. All teams compete in the Naugatuck Valley League.

The football team plays Ansonia each Thanksgiving, a series that began in 1900 and is among Connecticut’s best-known holiday rivalries.

== State championships ==
- Boys’ soccer (champions: 2001, 2002; runner-up: 2017)
- Football (champions: 1981, 1993)
- Girls’ volleyball (champions: 1978)
- Boys’ basketball (champions: 1922, 1930, 1931, 1942; runner-up: 2015)
- Boys’ swimming (champions: 1971, 1992)
- Baseball (champions: 1938, 1955, 1963, 1970, 1977)
- Boys’ outdoor track (runner-up: 2021)

Wins in CIAC State Championships
Sport	Class	Year(s)
Baseball	N/A	1938
Baseball	L	1955, 1963, 1970, 1971, 1977
Basketball (boys)	A	1922, 1930, 1931
Basketball (boys)	L	1942
Football	L-II	1981
Football	LL	1993
Swimming (boys)	L	1971, 1992
Soccer (boys)	LL	2001, 2002
Volleyball (girls)	M	1978

== Notable alumni ==
- Adrian (Class of 1921), Hollywood costume designer noted for The Wizard of Oz.
- Billy Burke (Class of 1920), professional golfer; winner of the 1931 U.S. Open.
- John Caneira (Class of 1970), former MLB pitcher (California Angels).
- James Dalton II (Class of 1927), U.S. Army major general; Distinguished Service Cross recipient.
- Pat Dean (Class of 2008), former MLB pitcher (Minnesota Twins).
- Mohamed Hrezi (Class of 2009), distance runner; represented Libya in the 2016 Olympic marathon.
- Ryan Kinne (Class of 2007), former professional soccer player (New England Revolution).
- Tommy Mars (Thomas Mariano; Class of 1969), keyboardist with Frank Zappa.
- Elmar Oliveira (Class of 1968), concert violinist, 1978 Tchaikovsky Competition gold medalist.
- James T. Patterson (Class of 1928), U.S. representative from Connecticut (1947–1959).
- Frank "Spec" Shea (Class of 1939), MLB pitcher; member of the 1947 World Series champion New York Yankees.
- Ronald A. Sarasin (Class of 1954), U.S. representative; later president/CEO, U.S. Capitol Historical Society.
- Dick Tuckey (Class of 1934), NFL running back (Washington Redskins).
