= John F. Kennedy High School (Connecticut) =

Coordinates: 41.5461°N 73.0574°W

Location
- 422 Highland Avenue; Waterbury, Connecticut 06708; United States

Information
- Type: Public
- CEEB code: 070840
- Principal: Robert A. Johnston
- Faculty: 99
- Teaching staff: 97.85 (FTE)
- Enrollment: 1,391 (2024-2025)
- Student to teacher ratio: 14.22
- Colors: Blue and Yellow
- Mascot: Eagles
- Website: kennedy.waterbury.k12.ct.us

John F. Kennedy High School is a high school, located in the city of Waterbury, Connecticut, United States. U.S. Congresswoman Jahana Hayes was a teacher here, and won National Teacher of the Year in 2016, prior to her successful run for congress in 2018.

== Athletics ==
Fall Season:

- Boys' Soccer (JV and Varsity)
- Boys' Football (Freshmen, JV, and Varsity)
- Cross Country (JV and Varsity)
- Girls' Swimming and Diving (JV and Varsity)
- Girls' Volleyball

Winter Season:

- Girls' Basketball
- Cheerleading
- Indoor Track
- Boys' Swimming and Diving

Spring Season:

- Baseball
- Softball
- Outdoor Track
- Tennis

John F. Kennedy High School is part of the Naugatuck Valley League.

Wins in CIAC State Championships
Sport	Class	Year(s)
Swimming (boys)	L	1973
