= Watertown High School (Connecticut) =

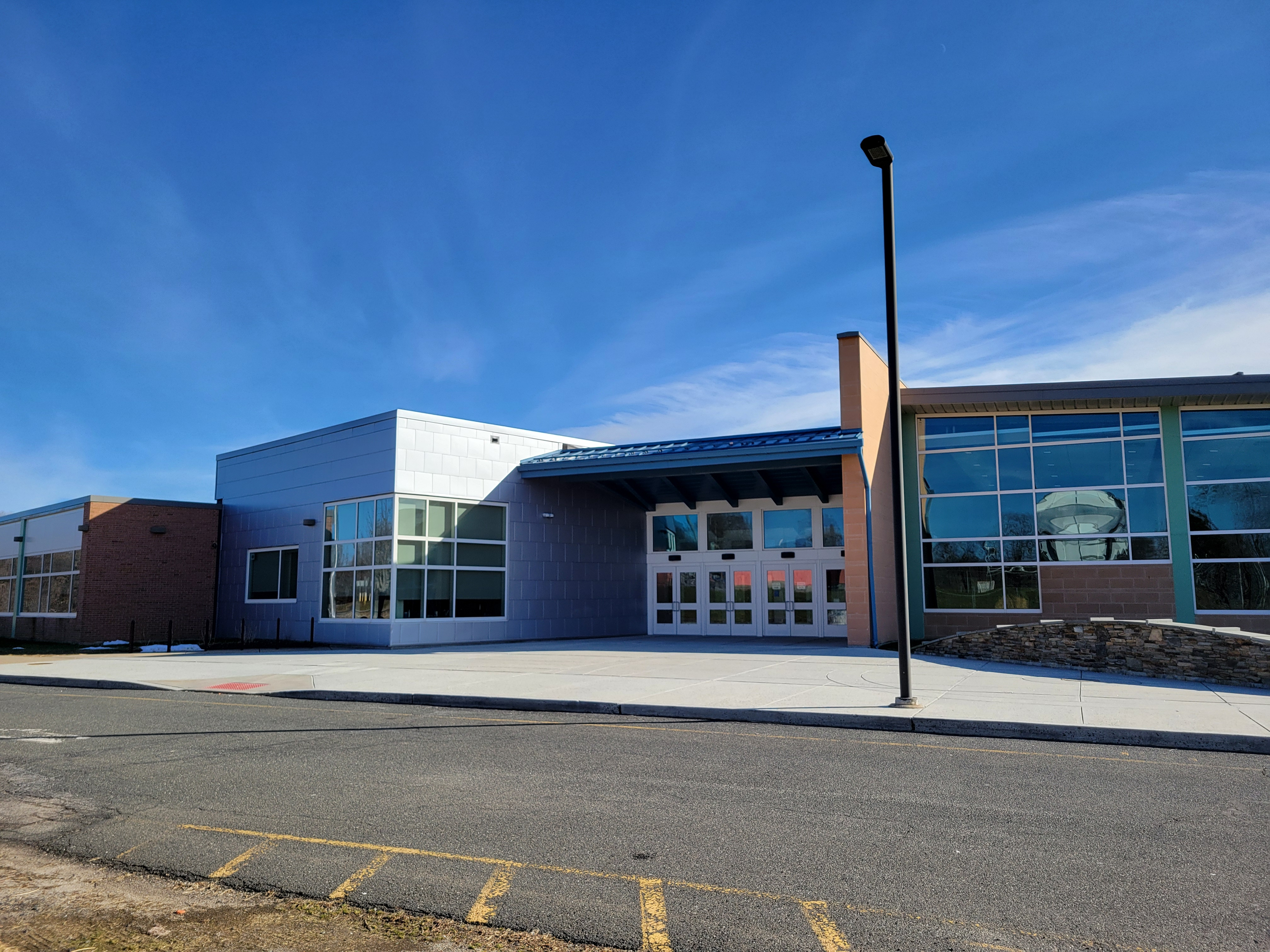

Location
- 324 French Street; Watertown, Connecticut 06795; United States
- Coordinates: 41°35′50″N 73°06′07″W

Information
- School type: Public
- Established: 1929 (97 years ago)
- School district: Watertown Public Schools
- CEEB code: 070882
- Principal: Gianni Perugini
- Grades: 9-12
- Enrollment: 715 (2023-2024)
- Colors: Orange and black
- Slogan: Dream
- Athletics: CAS
- Athletics conference: Naugatuck Valley League
- Mascot: Warriors
- Team name: Indians (1929–2022)
- Website: www.watertownps.org/o/watertown-high-school

Watertown High School (WHS) is a public high school serving Watertown, Connecticut, United States.

== Athletics ==
Watertown is a member of the Naugatuck Valley League. It supports a wide array of sports for its students, including soccer, cross country, field hockey, football, volleyball, basketball, indoor track, gymnastics, cheerleading, dance team, wrestling, swimming and diving, baseball, softball, golf, tennis, outdoor track, and lacrosse. Facilities for the sports are scattered all across Watertown, including its new turf field (2009) and pool located on campus, Deland Field, Veterans Memorial Park and Crestbrook Park Golf Course. Watertown is a member of CAS and CIAC. The boys' ice hockey team is a co-op between both Watertown High School and Pomperaug High School of Southbury, Connecticut. This team, unlike other sports the school offers, is a member of the South West Conference. All home games are played on the campus of the Taft School, also located in Watertown. Also co-op with Pomperaug is the boys' wrestling team.

The "Indians" mascot had been in use since the school's inception. The Watertown Board of Education voted on January 15, 2021, to retire the "Indians" mascot from the school's athletic teams. Students of the school chose the Warriors as the new mascot. Fawn Sharp, President of the National Congress of American Indians commended the change.

Wins in CIAC State Championships
Sport	Class	Year(s)
Baseball	S	1956
Baseball	L	1997
Cheer	L	2012, 2013, 2018
Football	S-I	1986
Golf (boys)	II	1994
Ice Hockey (boys)	III	2011 (Co-op with Pomperaug)
Swimming (boys)	S	1982, 1992
Swimming (boys)	M	1981

== Notable alumni ==
- Rico Brogna, Class of 1988 - MLB player
- Joe Cipriano, Class of 1972 - television announcer
