= Seymour High School (Connecticut) =

Location
- 2 Botsford Road; Seymour, Connecticut 06483; United States; 41°23′10″N 73°05′40″W

Information
- Type: Public
- Motto: "Once a wildcat, always a wildcat"
- Established: 1884 (142 years ago)
- School district: Seymour Public Schools
- CEEB code: 070660
- Principal: Paul Lucke
- Faculty: 47
- Grades: 9-12
- Enrollment: 604 (2024-2025)
- Campus type: Suburban
- Colors: Blue and Gold
- Athletics: Football, volleyball, cross country, boys and girls basketball, indoor and outdoor track and field, boys and girls swimming, baseball, softball, wrestling, weightlifting, girls tennis, boys and girls soccer
- Website: shs.seymourschools.org

Seymour High School is a secondary school at 2 Botsford Road in Seymour, Connecticut in the United States.

== History ==
The town of Seymour began building its first public high school in 1884 on Bank Street. It was built on a 2-acre (8,100 m^{2}) piece of property that the town purchased for $3,000. When the school first opened in the fall of 1886, it had 456 students, who all attended class in nine rooms. Later, the building was used as an elementary school, Center School. That building and its annex are now listed on the National Register of Historic Places.

Seymour bought land on Pine Street (Broad Street Bridge area) in 1915. By 1916, a high school was built. After the 1955 flood the school needed major renovations. After the renovations were complete, in the 1960s, the Pine Street School was converted into a middle school and a new high school was opened on Botsford Road. In 2006, a 22 million dollar renovation was added to the high school.

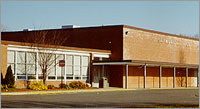
Seymour High School before its renovations

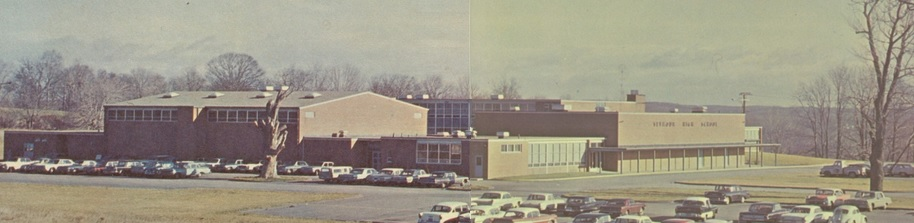
Seymour High School during its first year on Botsford Road. Built 1961.

== Athletics ==
Seymour High School is part of the Naugatuck Valley League (NVL) and the Connecticut Interscholastic Athletic Conference (CIAC).

The Seymour High School Cheerleading team won the state championship in 2010 and the Division IV regional championship in 2012.

The last state title the football team won was in 2007.

The baseball team has won the state championship in 2007 and made five other appearances in the state championship.

The Wildcats Softball Team has won multiple state championships (1993, 1995, 1996, 2000, 2004, 2005, 2006, and 2009). From 2005-2007, they had a 78-game winning streak which is a Connecticut record and ranks 6th nationally all-time. In 2004, Seymour Softball set a Connecticut state record for the most wins in a season (28). In 2006, Seymour's 31 home runs were the 8th best nationally all-time, and their 27 runs allowed was 3rd fewest nationally all-time.

The weightlifting team won a 2014 NVL Championship win.

Wins in CIAC State Championships
Sport	Class	Year(s)
Baseball	M	1956, 1962, 1969, 2007, 2018
Basketball (girls)	M	1993, 1998
Basketball (girls)	L	1997
Cheer	S	2014
Cheer	M	2010
Cheer	Coed	2018
Football	SS	1993, 2007
Football	M	1980, 1998
Softball	M	1993, 2006, 2009, 2014, 2016, 2017, 2021
Softball	L	1995, 1996, 2000, 2004, 2005
Track and field (indoor, boys)	M	2009
Track and field (outdoor, boys)	M	2008, 2009
Volleyball (girls)	M	2016, 2018, 2019

== See also ==
- National Register of Historic Places listings in New Haven County, Connecticut
