= Oxford High School (Connecticut) =

Location
- 61 Quaker Farms Road; Oxford, Connecticut 06478; United States
- 41°22′59″N 73°08′17″W

Information
- Type: Public
- Established: 2007 (19 years ago)
- School district: Oxford Public Schools
- CEEB code: 070929
- Principal: Heather O'Brien
- Teaching staff: 44.95 (FTE)
- Grades: 9-12
- Enrollment: 500 (2023-2024)
- Student to teacher ratio: 11.12
- Campus type: Suburban
- Colors: Blue and silver
- Mascot: Wolverine
- Website: ohs.oxfordpublicschools.org

Oxford High School is a public high school in Oxford, Connecticut, United States, operated by Oxford Public Schools. In spring 2013, there were 592 students enrolled in grades 9 to 12.

== Sports ==
Wins in CIAC State Championships
Sport	Class	Year(s)
Baseball	S	2013
Cheer	S	2009, 2010, 2011, 2012, 2016, 2019, 2022, 2025
Cross country (girls)	SS	2011
Softball	S	2013
Softball	M	2015
Volleyball (boys)	M	2013
