= Woodland Regional High School =

Location
- 135 Back Rimmon Road; Beacon Falls, Connecticut 06403; United States; 41°25′33″N 73°04′58″W

Information
- Type: Public secondary
- Established: 2001 (25 years ago)
- School district: Regional School District 16
- CEEB code: 070014
- Faculty: 73 (2008-2009 school year)
- Grades: 9-12
- Enrollment: 571 (2024-2025)
- Colors: Black and Vegas gold
- Mascot: Harry the Hawk
- Newspaper: Hawk Headlines
- Website: www.region16ct.org/apps/pages/index.jsp?uREC_ID=2189536&type=d&pREC_ID=2187702

Woodland Regional High School is a high school located in the western part of Beacon Falls, Connecticut, near the town line shared with Oxford.

The school is operated by Regional School District 16. The school mascot is Harry the hawk. Students residing in the towns of Beacon Falls and Prospect in grades 9 through 12 attend the school.

In 2025, Woodland was awarded the Connecticut Association of Schools High School of the Year award.

Wins in CIAC State Championships
Sport	Class	Year(s)
Baseball	M	2024, 2026
Football	SS	2004, 2005
Softball	M	2022, 2023, 2024
Swimming (boys)	S	2025
Volleyball (girls)	M	2013
Dance (hip hop)	L	2025
