= Litchfield Hills =

Region of the US state of Connecticut

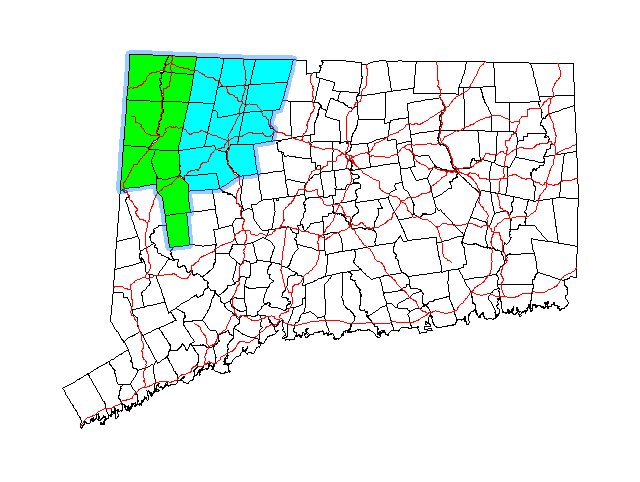
Map of Connecticut showing the Northwest Connecticut region in green and the Litchfield Hills region in blue

The Litchfield Hills (also known as the Northwest Hills or Northwest Highlands) comprise a geographic region in the northwestern corner of the U.S. state of Connecticut. It is roughly coterminous with the boundaries of Litchfield County, for which it is named. The geographic region includes colloquial subregions—rural Northwestern Connecticut and the area associated with the city of Torrington, also known as the Upper Naugatuck River Valley or simply Litchfield Hills—which have also variously corresponded to designated government councils both past and present. Much of the area makes up the lowermost section of the Berkshires and is culturally similar to the rest of western New England.

== Towns and cities ==
- Barkhamsted
- Burlington
- Canaan
- Colebrook
- Cornwall
- Goshen
- Hartland
- Harwinton
- Kent
- Litchfield
- Morris
- New Hartford
- Norfolk
- North Canaan
- Roxbury
- Salisbury
- Sharon
- Torrington
- Warren
- Washington
- Winchester

== Characteristics ==
The Litchfield hills are known for their distinct rural scenery, which can stand in contrast to central and southern Connecticut, which is largely urbanized or suburbanized. (However, there is some encroachment of development into the region as people from greater Hartford move west and people from New York City, northern New Jersey, and parts of Fairfield County move north.) This region is a key part of the Housatonic River and Farmington River watersheds, and encompasses a number of Connecticut's highest peaks, such as Bear Mountain and Canaan Mountain. Most of the region comprises forested and rocky hills with farmland and small towns interspersed in the flatter areas. The terrain in the Litchfield Hills area varies from gently rolling to the south and east to more mountainous toward the north and west. The region generally experiences colder temperatures due to higher elevation. The Litchfield Hills, like the rest of Northwest Connecticut, are known for their town greens, fall foliage, and historical architecture. The hills comprise the southernmost portion of the Berkshires. This region also plays host to a large portion of the state's small vineyard and wine industry. Historically, the region was well known for the limestone, iron, and dairy industries.

A unique term to the region is the word "raggie". Used as an insult by some and with a sense of local pride by others, the term "raggie" denotes someone with a lower income and approximates the term "white trash". The term probably originated from iron workers from Mount Riga in Salisbury. These workers were often poor immigrants who wore grubby clothes as a result of their work. After the iron works closed down, the workers moved to Norfolk, Winsted, and Torrington, and the name stuck. The term "raggie" is rarely, if ever, heard elsewhere.

== Subregions ==
=== Northwestern Connecticut ===
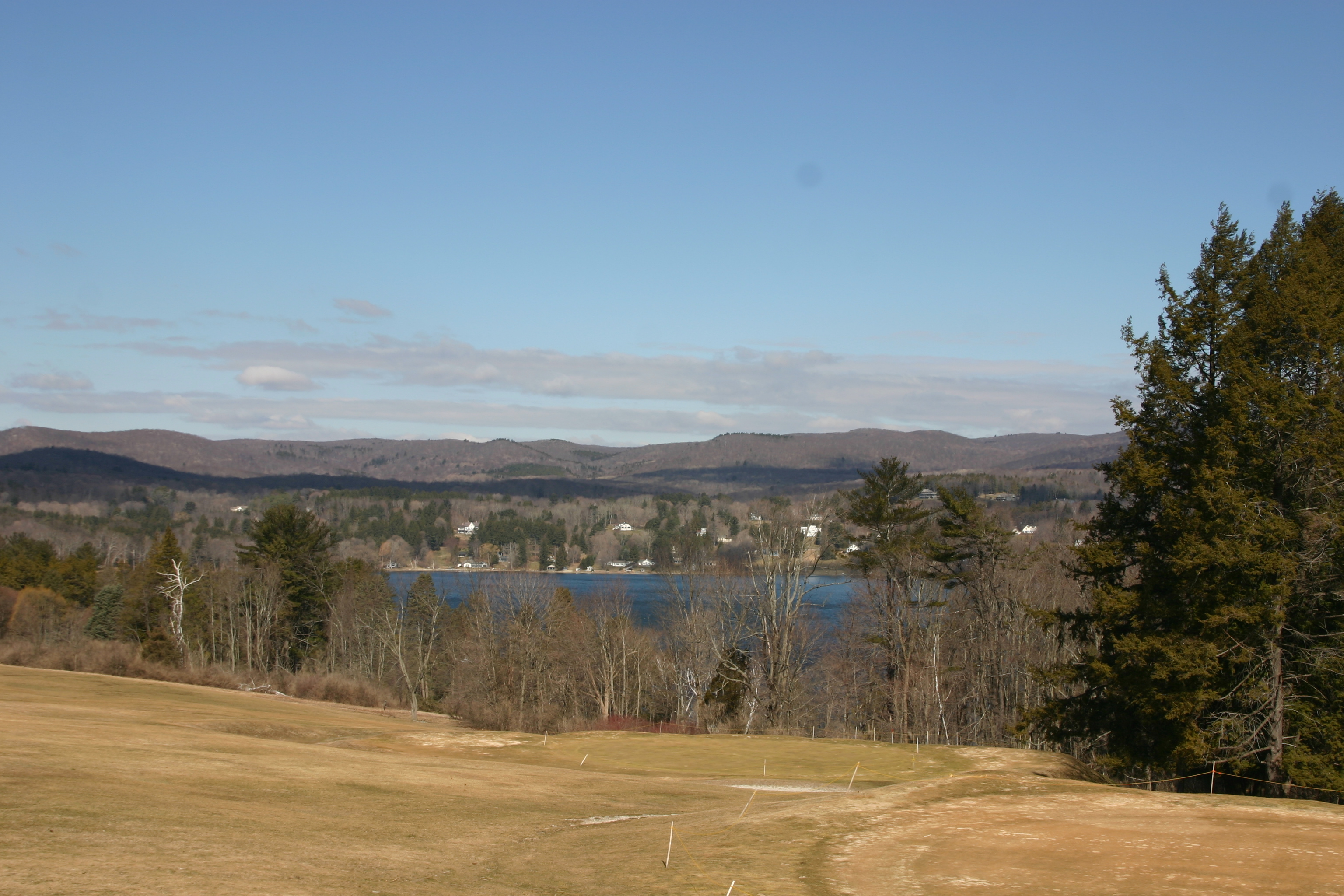
A scene from The Hotchkiss School in Salisbury

The towns included in the Northwestern Connecticut region are: Canaan, Cornwall, Kent, North Canaan, Roxbury, Salisbury, Sharon, Warren, Washington. Unlike the rest of Connecticut, the portion of Northwestern Connecticut around the upper Housatonic River contains more alkaline soils due to the underlying limestone. The flatter regions around the Housatonic River provide some of the best soils for farming in Litchfield County.

Due to the rural feel of the area, the region is an extremely popular location for second homes, primarily with New York City residents. The hills are rural enough to offer an escape from city life, yet close enough (less than 90 miles) to visit on weekends. Many visitors also arrive in the autumn to witness the fall foliage, and to visit the region's covered bridges or its many waterfalls.

The area has been and continues to be home to many famous or wealthy residents, including Mia Farrow, Meryl Streep, Dustin Hoffman, Denis Leary, Kevin Bacon, and is sometimes referred to as the Hamptons of Connecticut. This region is very similar to portions of Berkshire County, Massachusetts, which lies just to the north.

Northwestern Connecticut is known for its cultural activities, such as chamber performances at Music Mountain in Canaan and a wide array of art galleries. The region is also home to preparatory schools, such as the Hotchkiss School, Kent School, Marvelwood School, and The Gunnery.

=== Litchfield Hills ===
The Litchfield Hills region is also known as the Upper Naugatuck Valley and consists of the towns of Barkhamsted, Bethlehem, Colebrook, Goshen, Hartland, Harwinton, Litchfield, Morris, New Hartford, Norfolk, Torrington, and Winchester. The Litchfield Hills feel a stronger pull toward industry than Northwestern Connecticut, with manufacturing centering on the Naugatuck River in Torrington and Mad River in Winsted. Historically, brass, needles, scythes, and other products were manufactured in the area. However, the rural areas still retain industries such as dairy, vineyards, and stone. This region is sometimes included with the Naugatuck River Valley.

Originally settled in the mid 18th century as agriculturally based towns, the areas with access to flowing water began to develop industries in the 19th century. As the Midwest opened up to settlement, many farmers headed west in search of better farming opportunities. Among these included the John Brown family, originally from Torrington. Some notable areas settled by people from the Litchfield Hills include the Western Reserve of Ohio and Torrington, Wyoming. Around the time industry became important in the area, many immigrants came to work in the factories. Many of the immigrants in the Litchfield Hills area came from Italy, Ireland, Lebanon, Poland, and Slovakia. Later in the 20th century, many of these industries declined or relocated, producing conditions similar to the Midwestern rust belt, but on a smaller scale. Today, tourism remains an important industry for the Litchfield Hills.

The eastern towns, including Hartland, Barkhamsted, and New Hartford contain large water supply reservoirs to the city of Hartford.

Culturally, the Litchfield Hills are politically more conservative than the rest of Connecticut, with Litchfield County being the only county in the state to vote for George W. Bush in the 2004 election. The region contains its own section in the Waterbury Republican-American, which covers local events and news. The region is also split between allegiance to the New York Yankees and Boston Red Sox, with the southwestern part of the region generally supporting the Yankees and northeastern part of the region generally supporting the Red Sox.

== Notable people ==
- Ethan Allen, Revolutionary War hero and leader of the Vermont Republic
- Ira Allen, leader of the Vermont Republic
- Henry Ward Beecher, Congregational minister and abolitionist
- Lyman Beecher, Congregational minister
- John Brown, abolitionist
- Lorenzo Carter, pioneer in the Western Reserve
- Thomas Chittenden, governor of Vermont
- Jonathan Edwards (the younger), Congregational minister, Native American linguist, and abolitionist
- Charles Finney, Presbyterian minister and revivalist
- Madeleine L'Engle, author
- Elam Luddington, Mormon missionary
- Seth MacFarlane, cartoonist
- Michael J. McGivney, founder of the Knights of Columbus
- Admiral Charles B. McVay III, captain of the USS Indianapolis (CA-35) at the end of World War II
- Samuel John Mills, Congregational missionary
- Ralph Nader, politician
- Henry Obookiah, Hawaiian native instrumental in founding the Foreign Mission School
- Tapping Reeve, lawyer and educator
- Thomas Robbins, Congregational minister and librarian
- John Sedgwick, Civil War commander
- Harriet Beecher Stowe, writer and abolitionist
- Sergio Troncoso, novelist of Kent-inspired Nobody's Pilgrims
- Oliver Wolcott, politician

== See also ==
- Connecticut Wine Trail
