= St. Paul Catholic High School =

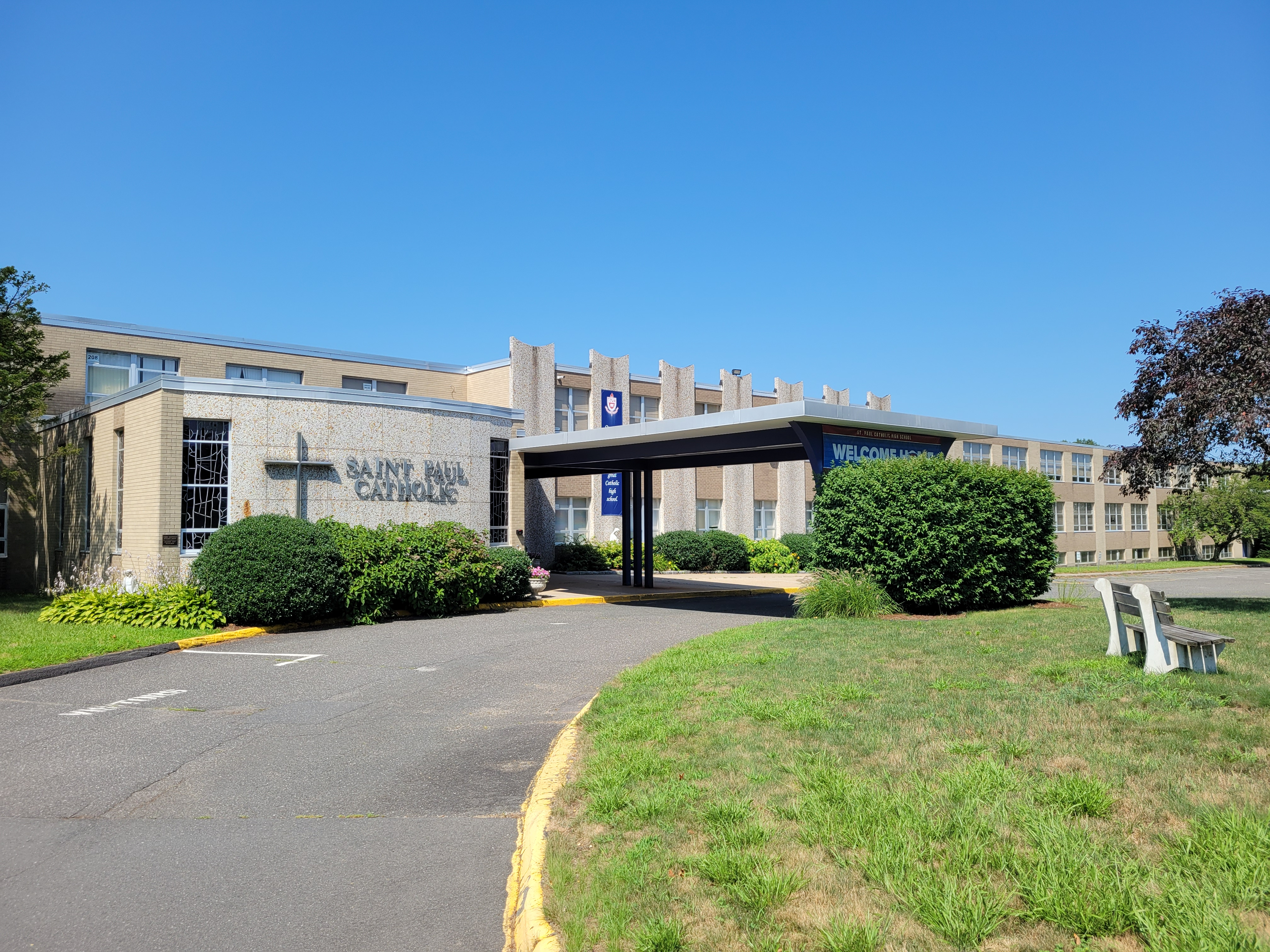
- St. Paul Catholic High School

Location
- 1001 Stafford Avenue; Bristol, Hartford County, Connecticut 06010; United States; 41°42′8″N 72°54′50″W

Information
- Type: Private, Coeducational
- Motto: "All things to all men."
- Religious affiliation: Roman Catholic
- Established: 1966 (60 years ago)
- School district: Archdiocese of Hartford
- Superintendent: Val Mara
- CEEB code: 070082
- President: James Cooper
- Chaplain: Rev. Daniel Hackenjos
- Grades: 9–12
- Colors: Blue, white, crimson
- Slogan: "Not in Our House"
- Song: Irish Blessing
- Athletics conference: Naugatuck Valley League (NVL)
- Mascot: Falcon
- Accreditation: New England Association of Schools and Colleges
- Website: spchs.com

St. Paul Catholic High School is a private, Roman Catholic high school in Bristol, Connecticut, United States. It is located in the Roman Catholic Archdiocese of Hartford. Its mascot is the falcon, and its colors are blue, white, and crimson.

== Background ==
St. Paul was established in 1966 and was originally staffed by the Sisters of St. Joseph.

== Athletics ==
St. Paul offers over 19 varsity sports for boys and girls combined.

Wins in CIAC State Championships
Sport	Class	Year(s)
Baseball	S	2016, 2022, 2025, 2026
Baseball	M	1971, 1972
Basketball (boys)	M	1974, 1975, 1988
Basketball (girls)	S	2001, 2010
Basketball (girls)	M	2024
Golf (boys)	III	1994
Golf (boys)	II	1992
Soccer (boys)	M	1980
Soccer (boys)	L	1984 (Co-champions with Wethersfield)
Tennis (boys)	M	1982 (Co-champions with Bethel), 1983 (Co-champions with Bethel)
Track and field (indoor, boys)	M	1970 (Co-champions with East Catholic), 1971, 1972, 1973 (Co-champions with Bethel and Farmington), 1974, 1975 (Co-champions with Xavier), 1977
Track and field (outdoor, boys)	M	1971
Softball	S	2026

== Notable alumni ==
- Cara Pavalock-D'Amato, member of the Connecticut House of Representatives
- Byron Jones, DB for the Dallas Cowboys (2015-2019) and Miami Dolphins (2020–2022)
- Steve Pikiell, head basketball coach of Rutgers University
