= Oxford, Connecticut =

- Town
- Town of Oxford
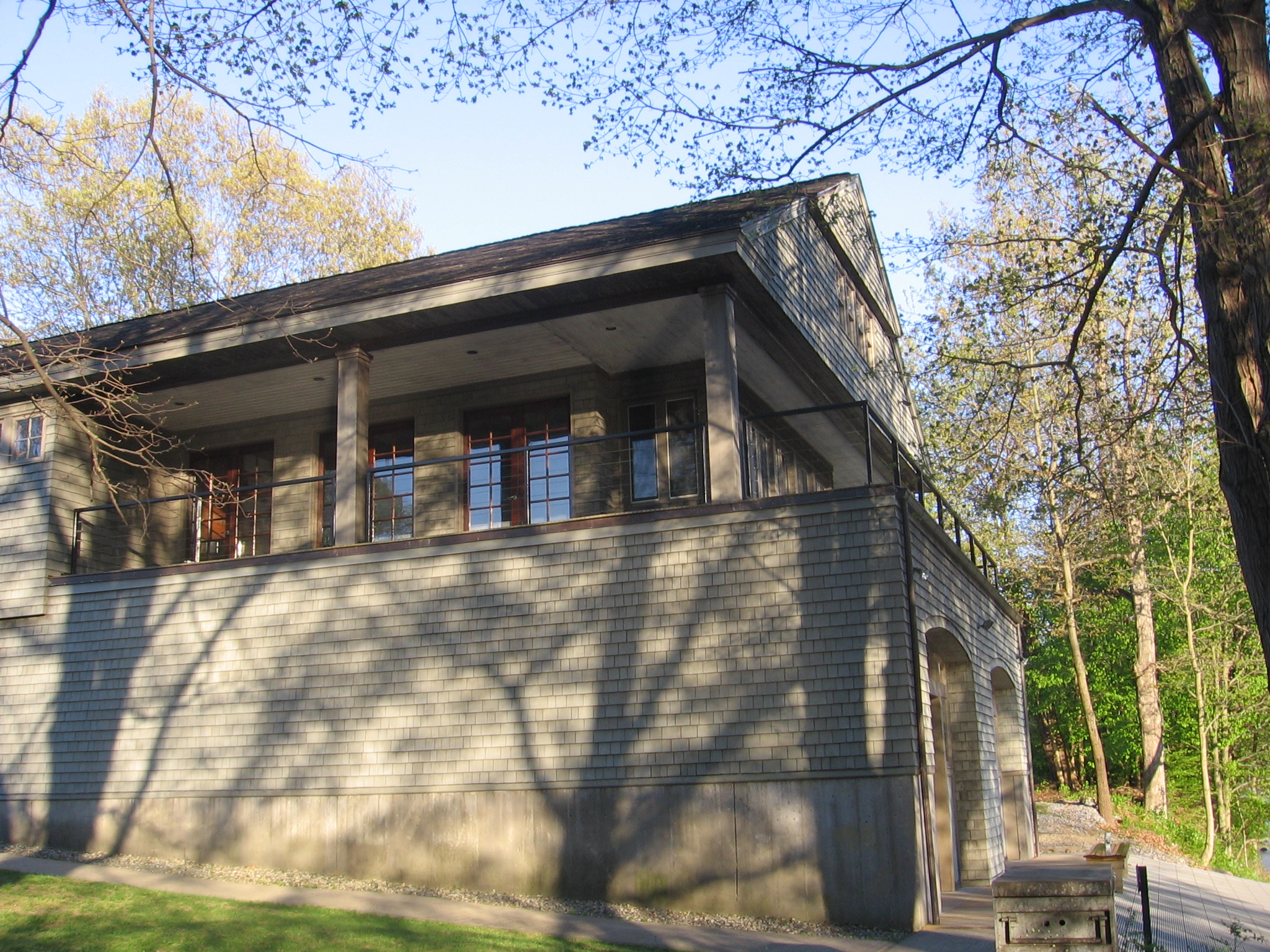
- New Haven Rowing Club house in Oxford

- Seal
- Motto: "A Place to live, a town to love"
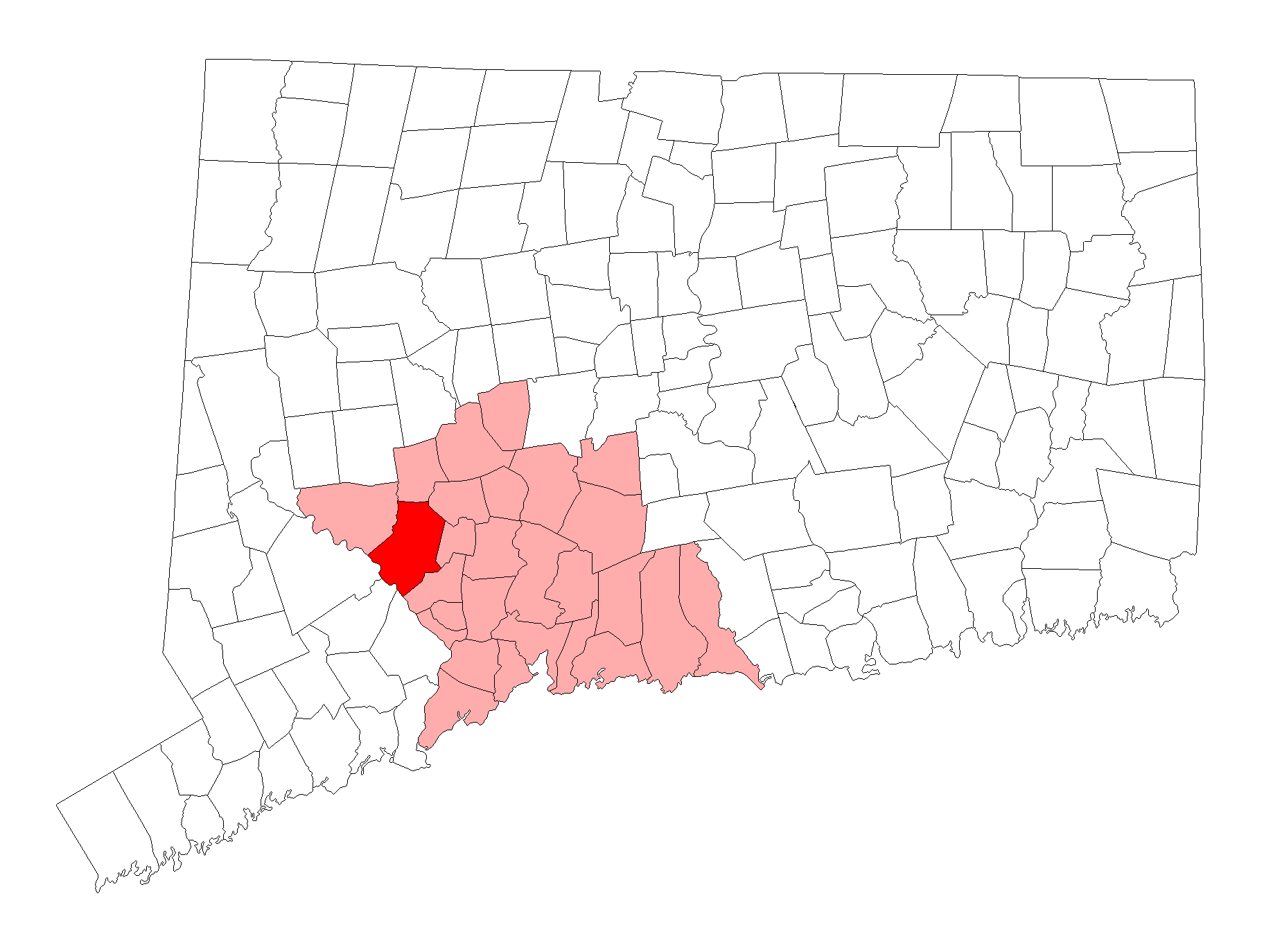
- Coordinates: 41°25′48″N 73°08′05″W
- Country: United States
- U.S. state: Connecticut
- County: New Haven
- Region: Naugatuck Valley
- Incorporated: 1798

Government
  - Type: Selectman-town meeting
  - First Selectman: Temple, George
  - Selectmen: Heather Haney, Arnold Jensen

Area
  - Total: 33.3 sq mi (86.3 km^{2})
  - Land: 32.7 sq mi (84.8 km^{2})
  - Water: 0.58 sq mi (1.5 km^{2})
- Elevation: 705 ft (215 m)

Population (2020)
  - Total: 12,706
  - Density: 388/sq mi (150/km^{2})
- Time zone: UTC-5 (Eastern)
  - Summer (DST): UTC-4 (Eastern)
- ZIP code: 06478
- Area codes: 203/475
- FIPS code: 09-58300
- GNIS feature ID: 0213486
- Website: www.oxford-ct.gov

Oxford is a residential town located in western New Haven County, Connecticut, United States. The town is part of the Naugatuck Valley Planning Region. The population was 12,706 at the 2020 Census. Oxford is the 26th-wealthiest town in the state by median household income. Distinct settled areas in the town include Oxford Center, Quaker Farms, and Riverside. Oxford belongs to the Bridgeport–Stamford–Norwalk Metropolitan Statistical Area, a subregion of the New York metropolitan area.

== History ==
In the 18th century, farmers herded livestock through Oxford from as far away as Litchfield on the way to the port of New Haven. In the 19th century, the town lost population as farmers moved to work in better-paying factories.

Oxford was incorporated in October 1798. The town is named after Oxford, in England.

=== 2024 Flooding ===
On Sunday, August 18, 2024, the town of Oxford experienced what is now widely reported as the greatest amount of rainfall in the history of the state with recorded rainfall as high as 16.31 inches in the town. The prior state record of 12.77 inches of rainfall was set on August 19, 1955 from Hurricane Diane, almost 69 years ago to the day of the 2024 storm. The community was devastated with numerous homes, roads, and other structures being destroyed by flood waters. The impacts of the storm on the area of western Connecticut in which Oxford is located led the Governor, Ned Lamont, to file for a Federal Emergency Declaration.

=== 2001 Anthrax Death ===
In November 2001, Oxford made international headlines when one of its residents, 94-year-old Ottilie Lundgren, became the fifth and last person to be killed by the 2001 anthrax attacks that occurred shortly after the September 11 attacks. The lack of any additional cases in the area suggested Lundgren's death was the result of accidental cross-contamination of the mail.

== Geography ==
According to the United States Census Bureau, the town has a total area of 33.3 square miles (86.3 km^{2}), of which 32.7 square miles (84.8 km^{2}) is land and 0.58 square miles (1.5 km^{2}), or 1.78%, is water.

The towns bordering Oxford are Monroe, Newtown, Southbury, Middlebury, Naugatuck, Beacon Falls, Seymour and Shelton.

== Demographics ==
Historical population
| Census | Pop. | Note | %± |
|---|---|---|---|
| 1820 | 1,683 | | — |
| 1850 | 1,564 | | — |
| 1860 | 1,269 | | −18.9% |
| 1870 | 1,338 | | 5.4% |
| 1880 | 1,120 | | −16.3% |
| 1890 | 902 | | −19.5% |
| 1900 | 952 | | 5.5% |
| 1910 | 1,020 | | 7.1% |
| 1920 | 998 | | −2.2% |
| 1930 | 1,141 | | 14.3% |
| 1940 | 1,375 | | 20.5% |
| 1950 | 2,037 | | 48.1% |
| 1960 | 3,292 | | 61.6% |
| 1970 | 4,480 | | 36.1% |
| 1980 | 6,634 | | 48.1% |
| 1990 | 8,685 | | 30.9% |
| 2000 | 9,821 | | 13.1% |
| 2010 | 12,683 | | 29.1% |
| 2020 | 12,706 | | 0.2% |
U.S. Decennial Census

As of the census of 2010, there were 12,683 people, 4,504 households, and 3,672 families residing in the town. Oxford's population increased 29.1% between 2000 and 2010, making it the fastest-growing municipality in Connecticut for that period. The population density was 387.9 inhabitants per square mile (149.8/km^{2}). There were 4,746 housing units at an average density of 145.1 per square mile (56.0/km^{2}). The racial makeup of the town was 95.5% White, 1.1% African American, 0.1% Native American, 1.5% Asian, 0.02% Pacific Islander, 0.6% some other race, and 1.1% from two or more races. Hispanic or Latino of any race were 3.7% of the population.

There were 4,504 households, out of which 34.9% had children under the age of 18 living with them, 71.4% were headed by married couples living together, 6.9% had a female householder with no husband present, and 18.5% were non-families. 14.2% of all households were made up of individuals, and 6.1% were someone living alone who was 65 years of age or older. The average household size was 2.81, and the average family size was 3.12.

In the town, the population was spread out, with 24.3% under the age of 18, 5.8% from 18 to 24, 23.0% from 25 to 44, 33.4% from 45 to 64, and 13.5% who were 65 years of age or older. The median age was 43.4 years. For every 100 females, there were 98.9 males. For every 100 females age 18 and over, there were 97.9 males.

Oxford belongs to Connecticut's 4th congressional district, which stretches from lower Fairfield County to western New Haven County.

In 2016, the average income for a household in the town was $137,766, with a median income of $110,602. The median home value was $405,900.

== Economy ==
A University of Connecticut development study spanning 1985–2006 showed that Oxford had the largest increase of development by percentage, growing 62% during that time. The median household income in town grew 20%, ranking Oxford the 26th wealthiest of 169 communities in the state.

== Arts and culture ==
The Oxford Public Library was originally founded in 1883 and has moved several times, including to a new location in 2018.

From 1966 through 1973, Oxford was the home of Harmony Ranch on Bowers Hill Road, occupied by a group of research associates at Yale's School of Art and Architecture. Calling themselves a multimedia arts collective, they operated under the group-name Pulsa. Over its lifetime, Pulsa placed notable sound/light installations at Yale, MOMA (NY), Boston Public Gardens, University of Rhode Island, SUNY-Albany, and California Institute of the Arts, among other locations. David Rumsey, a founding member, was quoted in the New York Times as saying "“Our art's an experience and after it's over, it's over. There's nothing to own”.

=== Museums and other points of interest ===
- Quaker Farms Historic District
- Wooster Sawmill and Gristmill Site
- Twitchell-Rowland Homestead Center and Museum

The people of Oxford and the Oxford Historical Society were honored with a Connecticut Trust Preservation Award in 2012 for preservation efforts with respect to the Twitchell-Rowland Homestead.

== Parks and recreation ==
Among the parks serving Oxford residents are Southford Falls State Park in the northern section of town, Jackson Cove Beach, and Kirks Pond in the center of town. The 10.4-mile (16.7 km) Larkin State Park Trail, created in the 1940s from the path of a former train track, is one of the earliest examples of the "rails-to-trails" movement.

The Golf Club at Oxford Greens, a public golf course with over 400 homes for "active adults" over the age of 55, is located in town.

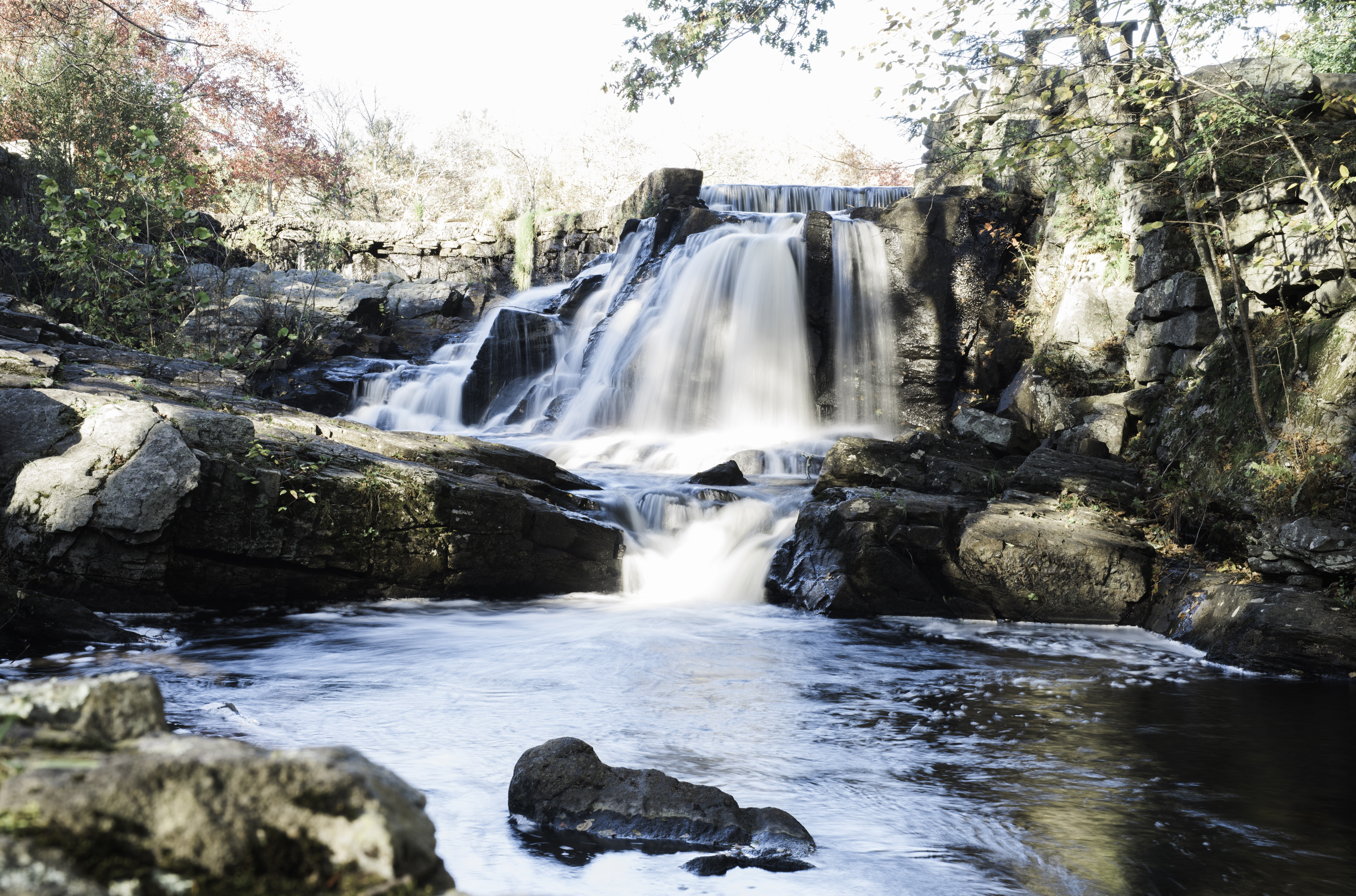
Southford Falls in Oxford and Southbury is a popular spot with photographers and hikers.

== Education ==
Oxford has two elementary schools, one middle school, and a high school.

- Quaker Farms School: 550 students in grades K through 2;
- Great Oak School (formerly Oxford Center School): 499 students in grades 3 through 5;
- Oxford Middle School (formerly Great Oak Middle School): 501 students in grades 6 through 8;
- Oxford High School: 554 students in grades 9 through 12.

Great Schools ranks Oxford Public Schools a 9 out of 10, or Excellent. In 2008, 90 percent of fourth grade students met state standards in math (as compared to 85 percent statewide); 82 percent in reading (statewide: 74 percent); 95 percent in writing (statewide: 85 percent). A total of 92 percent of eighth graders in town met state math standards (statewide: 85 percent), 94 percent in reading (statewide: 81 percent); and 94 percent in writing (statewide: 84 percent).

Oxford High School is a member of the Naugatuck Valley League, or NVL, for athletics.

== Media ==
Local newspapers include:

- Connecticut Post of Bridgeport.
- Republican-American of Waterbury.
- New Haven Register of New Haven.
- Voices, a free publication distributed in over 20 towns in Fairfield, New Haven and Litchfield counties.

Local media broadcasting stations are:

- WTNH-New Haven
- WTIC-TV-Hartford
- WVIT-Hartford
- WFSB-Hartford

The local cable provider is Comcast of Western Connecticut, located in Seymour.

== Infrastructure ==
=== Transportation ===
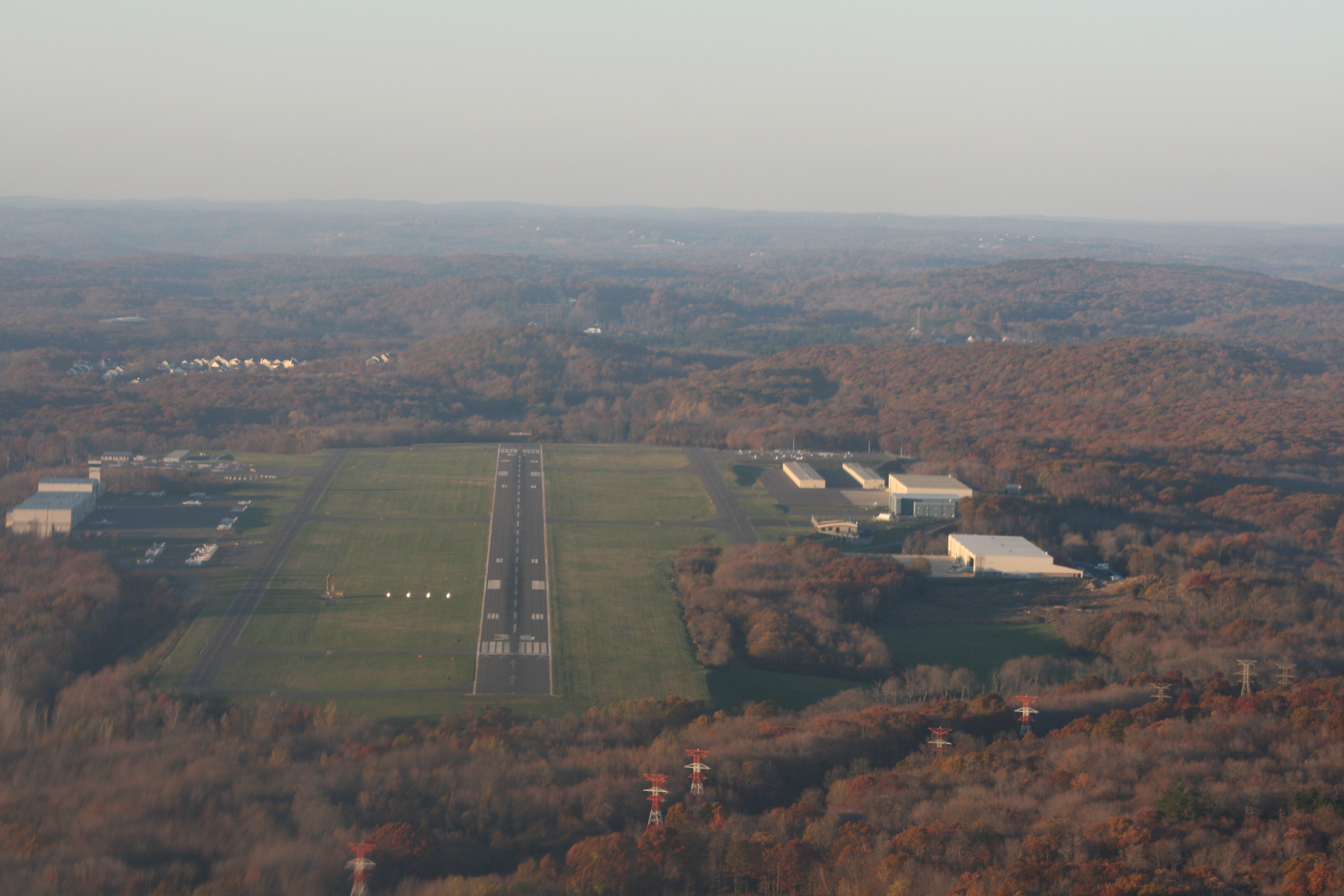
Waterbury-Oxford Airport

The town is bisected by Route 67 that begins in Woodbridge and ends in New Milford. Route 188 runs through the Quaker Farms section of town. Other major roads in town are Route 34 along the Housatonic River (and which crosses the Housatonic into Monroe via the Stevenson Dam Bridge) and Route 42 in the eastern section of town.

Waterbury-Oxford Airport, with the second largest runway in Connecticut is located in Oxford and Middlebury. The airport, which is owned and operated by the Connecticut Department of Transportation, has become one of the largest and fastest growing corporate aviation centers in the Northeast. There are 252 aircraft based at the airport, with 80 of those aircraft being large corporate business jets.

== Notable people ==
- John Lyman Chatfield (1826–1863), U.S. Civil War colonel
- Barbara Hershey (born 1948), actress
- Orson Hyde (1805–1878), leader in the early Latter Day Saint movement and member of the first Quorum of the Twelve Apostles
- Kurt Kepshire (born 1959), former pitcher for the Saint Louis Cardinals
- Ottilie Pauline Wilke Lundgren (1907–2001), victim of the 2001 anthrax attacks
- Andrew Leete Stone (1815–1892), pastor, author, and Civil War chaplain
- Elliot M. Sutton (1841–1908), politician (mayor of Burlington, Vermont, member of the Vermont Senate)
