= Frances Osborne Kellogg =

American industrialist and dairy farmer (1876–1956)

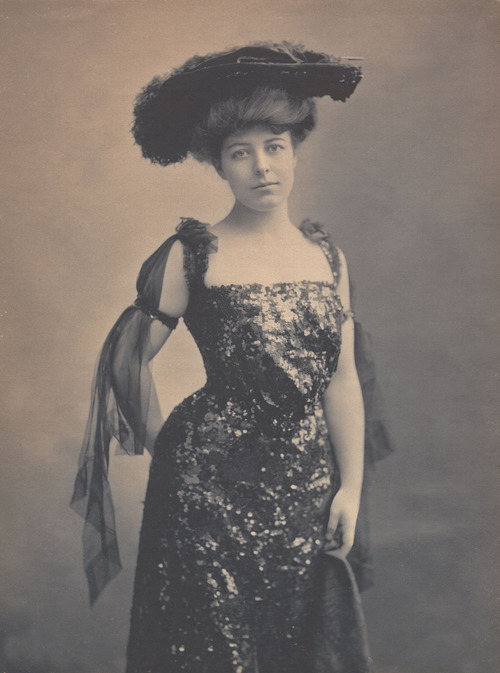
- Born: May 11, 1876; Derby, Connecticut, US
- Died: September 26, 1956 (aged 80); Derby, Connecticut
- Occupations: Industrialist, dairy farmer, philanthropist
- Known for: Proprietor and namesake of Osborne Homestead Museum and Osbornedale State Park

Frances Eliza Osborne Kellogg (May 11, 1876 – September 26, 1956) was an American industrialist, dairy farmer, and philanthropist. Running large firms in the US and UK, Kellogg also bred award-winning Holstein cattle. Her family estate became the Osbornedale State Park and Osborne Homestead Museum. The museum is one of 13 sites on the Connecticut Women's Heritage Trail, celebrating the state's female trailblazers. Her bequest to the University of Connecticut funded the construction of the Frances E. Osborne Kellogg Dairy Center in Storrs in 1991.

== Early life and family ==
Frances Eliza Osborne was from an old New England family. Her grandfather, John W. Osborne, co-founded the Osborne & Cheeseman Company, a brass manufacturer. Her father, Wilbur Fisk Osborne (1841–1907), inherited John Osborne's stake in the company and founded or co-founded several other firms, including the Union Fabric Company and the F. Kelley Company of Ansonia, the Connecticut Clasp Company of Bridgeport, and the Derby Silver Company, which became an affiliate of the International Silver Company. Wilbur Osborne was an American Civil War veteran, attaining the rank of major. He was an alumnus of Wesleyan University, a donor and trustee for Derby Neck Library, and an officer of the Derby Methodist Church.

Frances Osborne was born at the Osborne Homestead in Derby, Connecticut, on May 11, 1876. She was the youngest of four children born to Wilbur Fisk Osborne (1841–1907) and Ellen Lucy Davis, and their only progeny to reach adulthood. Her doting parents nicknamed her "Bobbin" because, her father said, only the bobbins in his factory's knitting machines moved faster than she did. Her mother managed the family farm while her father ran the family business. Frances Osborne spent her childhood on the farm but studied violin in New Haven and visited her paternal aunt, Helen, in New York City, where her uncle, Henry Edward Krehbiel, took her to concerts and imparted a keen appreciation for opera, theatre, and the visual arts.

A sewing needle accident left Frances Osborne blind in one eye in 1893. She never returned for her senior year at Ansonia High School. However, she continued to take lessons in violin and music theory, some at the future Juilliard School. In her twenties she began giving violin lessons in the Naugatuck River Valley. In 1901, she started a women’s choral group that grew into the Derby Choral Club, a mixed chorus of 250 voices directed by Horatio Parker. The chorus performed for 16 years till Parker's death in 1919. She learned the family business from her father and accompanied him on his travels and speaking engagements. She traveled independently too, attending Daughters of the American Revolution conventions.

== Business acumen ==
On the morning of March 30, 1907, Wilbur F. Osborne died suddenly of a heart attack, after a quiet evening reading and playing chess with his daughter. His wife and daughter inherited his business interests. According to one anecdote, the probate judge suggested that the Osbornes sell the companies and live off the proceeds. Frances retorted, "Sell them? No. I intend to run them." Despite the judge's horrified expression and resistance from minority shareholders, Frances was true to her word, running four companies and growing the family fortune. Women in the United States were not allowed to vote until 1920, and female chief executives were few and far between, but Frances Osborne succeeded through determination and business acumen.

Osborne served as president of Union Fabric Company, which manufactured covered wire, including corset and hat wires. She served as vice president of Connecticut Clasp Company, which manufactured garment clasps, and as treasurer of the F. Kelly Company, which manufactured paper fasteners, hose supporters and corset and suspender trimmings. She also held stock in Derby Silver Company. In 1916, she became a founding partner of Steels and Busks Ltd. of Leicester, England, which made wires supports and springs for corsets and other women's garments. Her English business ventured doubled her investment in its first year. Osborne also served as the first woman bank director in Connecticut (of the Birmingham National Bank).

== Dairy farming ==
Around 1910, Frances organized a major renovation of her home in Derby. Much of the elegant Colonial Revival remodeling was supervised by architect Henry Killham Murphy.

In 1919, at the age of 43, Osborne married Waldo Stewart Kellogg (1870–1928), a 49-year-old architect from New York with a degree from Cornell University. She had hired his firm several years earlier to design cottages for her employees in Derby. Waldo managed and expanded the Osborndale Farm, while Frances continued to focus on her corporate ventures.

The Kelloggs partnered in the raising and breeding of Holstein Friesian dairy cattle and developed a model dairying operation at Lakeview Dairy Farm, part of the Osbornedale estate. Their herd set records in milk production, butterfat, and milkfat and received numerous prizes at exhibitions and fairs throughout New England, New York, and Canada.

After her husband died in 1928, Frances Osborne Kellogg carried on the management of Osbornedale Farm, breeding one of the most influential Holstein bulls of all time: "Osborndale Ivanhoe." Some dairy publications ranked her among the top ten dairy breeders of all time. She served as president of the American Holstein-Friesian Association, president of the Connecticut Holstein-Friesian Association, director of the Connecticut Jersey Cattle Club, director of the National Dairy Show, and director of the New Haven County Farm Bureau.

== Philanthropy ==
Kellogg was a committed conservationist, serving as the first female vice president of the Connecticut Forest and Parks Association from 1934 to 1938 and serving as a director for 20 years.

In 1951, Kellogg donated her home and 350-acre family estate, later the Osbornedale State Park and Osborne Homestead Museum, to the State of Connecticut. She also left an endowment to establish a "nature education center," now the Kellogg Environmental Center. Kellogg retained life usage of the estate until her death. Her housekeeper, Eva Little, also had life usage; she died in 1976. The Kellogg Family Trust and the Connecticut Department of Energy and Environmental Protection continue to provide for the upkeep of the park and the staff of the Kellogg Environmental Center and Osborne Homestead Museum. The museum is a 12-room Colonial Revival mansion originally built in 1840 and extensively renovated in 1910. The grounds feature extensive flower and rock gardens. The building is listed on the National Register of Historic Places and is one of 13 sites on the Connecticut Women's Heritage Trail, celebrating the state's female trailblazers.

Kellogg was very active in the community. As president of the Women’s Club of Ansonia, Derby, and Shelton, she sponsored many famous musicians and celebrities, including Amelia Earhart and Harry Burleigh, to give lectures at the Sterling Opera House. She served as a trustee of Griffin Hospital, the first female member of the Board of Directors of Birmingham National Bank, member of the Derby Methodist Church, and president of the Board of Directors of Derby Neck Library, which her father had been instrumental in establishing in 1897. Kellogg continued to support the library after her father's death. She even spent afternoons volunteering at the library up until a few weeks before her death. The long-time librarian was Kellogg's cousin, Miss Helen Krehbiel, who died on July 10, 1956. Kellogg also served on the Derby Board of Education for eight years and on the Board of Zoning Appeals for a number of years, being a member at the time of her death.

Kellogg's 1956 bequest to the University of Connecticut funded the construction of the Frances E. Osborne Kellogg Dairy Center on Horsebarn Hill Road in Storrs in 1991. The Kellogg Dairy Center is a state-of-the-art, free-stall facility and milking parlor. The building also contains a classroom, laboratory, animal surgery facility, and an area for the public to observe the milking.

== Death ==
After several weeks' illness, Kellogg died at home on September 26, 1956. She was 80 years old. She was interred at the Oak Cliff Cemetery.

Kellogg died without issue and was survived by several cousins.
