= Tony Passander =

American gridiron football player (born 1948)

Profile
- Position: Quarterback

Personal information
- Born: August 29, 1948 (age 78); Derby, Connecticut, U.S.
- Listed height: 6 ft 0 in (1.83 m)
- Listed weight: 190 lb (86 kg)

Career information
- High school: Derby (CT)
- College: The Citadel

Career history
- 1970: Montreal Alouettes

Awards and highlights
- Grey Cup champion (1970)

Tony Passander (born August 29, 1948) was an American professional football player who played for the Montreal Alouettes of the Canadian Football League. He won the Grey Cup with them in 1970. He previously played college football at The Citadel, The Military College of South Carolina in Charleston.
