= John Ireland Howe =

American inventor

- Born: July 20, 1793; Ridgefield, Connecticut, U.S.
- Died: September 10, 1876 (aged 83); Birmingham, Connecticut, U.S.
- Resting place: Oak Cliff Cemetery, Derby, Connecticut
- Occupations: Inventor, manufacturer, physician
- Employer: Howe Manufacturing Company
- Known for: Pin-making machine, rubber compound experimentation

Doctor John Ireland Howe (July 20, 1793 – September 10, 1876) was an inventor and manufacturer. He was born in Ridgefield, Connecticut. He began the study of medicine in 1812; he then worked as a resident physician at the New York Almshouse.

In 1828, he moved to New York City where he continued in his practice of medicine.

== Rubber ==
During his residence in New York, he experimented on India-Rubber, where he invented and patented a process for preparing rubber compounds. And in 1828 after obtaining the patent for the rubber compound, he attempted to market his rubber product but was unsuccessful in his attempt.

In 1829, Howe settled in North Salem N. Y. where he built a factory for the manufacture of the rubber compound, which was abandoned soon thereafter, owing to the lack of a successful product. Howe was quoted: “So far as I know, I was the first person who attempted to utilize rubber by combining other substances with it, but I did not happen to stumble upon the right substance."

== Pins ==
Howe had seen pins being made by manual process at the Alms House. Pins had long been made by hand using division of labor, as famously described by Adam Smith in The Wealth of Nations.

He then began a series of experiments with a view of constructing a machine for the manufacture of pins, and, after laboring during the winters of 1830—1831, made a machine that was successful as a working model, and would make pins, though in a less than perfect manner. He patented this machine in 1832 and, during the same year, was awarded a large silver medal by the American Institute of the City of New York. A second machine was completed early in 1833, after which Howe traveled to Europe for the purpose of securing patents abroad. In January, 1834, he began the building of a machine, in Manchester, with which pins to the weight of 24,000 to the pound were made, but he was unsuccessful in disposing of his European patents, and returned to New York after an absence of almost two years.

After his return the Howe Manufacturing Company was organized for the purpose of making pins with the machine he had invented. Howe took the position of general agent of the company, and continued in that capacity until 1865, being in charge of the management of the manufacturing department.

Shops were initially set up in New York in 1836, but then the factory was moved in 1838 to Birmingham, Connecticut.

Late in 1838 a new "rotary machine" was developed by Howe, which he patented in 1840. For thirty years this rotary machine was used without needing any material improvement or alteration.

In 1842 Howe was awarded a gold medal by the American Institute for the "best solid-headed pins," which were made on his machine. Subsequently, he invented improvements in the methods used for "sheeting" pins, and was associated with the invention of means by which japanned "mourning-pins" were made.

== Patents ==
He received a patent on his first machine in 1832, and another (#2,013) on the rotary machine in 1841.

Howe's innovation was to mechanize the entire process into one machine: a rotary table, its motion controlled by cams, moved the pins from one station to the next. An 1839 article described the process:

"The apparatus is one of the most ingenious and beautiful pieces of mechanism in the whole circle of the arts. Those who have any fondness for mechanical ingenuity must see it for themselves. The wire from which the pins are to be made is passed in at one end of the machine, cut in the requisite length, and passed from point to point, until the pins are headed and fitted for the process of silvering and putting up. The whole process may be distinctly seen, and as one pair of forceps hands the pin along to its neighbour, it is difficult to believe the machine is not an intelligent being."

== Manufacturing ==
Howe established the Howe Manufacturing Company in 1833 in New York City and moved it to Derby, Connecticut, in 1836. In 1839, three pin machines were in operation, producing 72,000 pins per day. In 1845, the company employed 30 men and 40 women and produced pins worth $60,000.

Howe's machine-made pins were not, at first, cheaper than hand-made pins, and Howe fought to receive tariff protection to keep British pins out of the country.

He retired from the manufacturing business in 1865 and died in Birmingham, Connecticut in 1876. His grave is in Oak Cliff Cemetery in Derby. Howe's home on Caroline Street in Derby, Connecticut is listed on the National Register of Historic Places as John I. Howe House.
