= David L. Katz =

American physician (born 1963)

- Born: February 20, 1963 (age 63); Los Angeles, California
- Education: Dartmouth College (BA, 1984); Albert Einstein College of Medicine (MD, 1988); Yale School of Public Health (MPH, 1993)
- Spouse: Catherine (Sananès) Katz
- Children: 5
- Scientific career
- Fields: Preventive medicine
- Thesis: Implications of compliance with the national guideline for dietary fat in the RENO diet-heart study (1993)
- Website: www.davidkatzmd.com

David L. Katz (born February 20, 1963) is an American physician, nutrition expert, and writer. He was the founding director of the Yale-Griffin Prevention Research Center that was established at the Yale School of Public Health and Griffin Hospital in 1998. Katz is the founder and chief executive officer of Diet ID and founder and president of the True Health Initiative. He is a notable advocate of evidence-based medicine and public health, of the confluence of human and planetary health, and of plant-predominant dietary patterns.

== Education ==
Katz received a BA in French from Dartmouth College in 1984, an MD from the Albert Einstein College of Medicine in 1988, and an MPH from the Yale School of Public Health in 1993. He earned board-certification in Internal Medicine and in Preventive Medicine/Public Health.

== Career ==
Katz completed his internal medicine training at Norwalk Hospital in Connecticut and his preventive medicine residency at the Yale School of Medicine. He joined the faculty of the Yale School of Medicine and Public Health, where he held appointments including Associate Clinical Professor of Epidemiology and Public Health and Associate Clinical Professor of Medicine.

Katz served as founding director of Yale University's Yale-Griffin Prevention Research Center from 1998 to 2019. The Center was established with a grant from the Centers for Disease Control and Prevention to the Yale School of Public Health. During Katz' tenure as director, the center received a total of roughly $40 million in funding. He stepped down as director on October 1, 2019.

He served as Chief Science Officer of NuVal, LLC, from 2008 to 2018, and was the inaugural editor-in-chief of the journal Childhood Obesity for five years. He was President of the American College of Lifestyle Medicine from 2014 to 2016.

In 2015, Katz founded True Health Initiative, a 501c3 non-profit. He also co-chaired Oldways' Finding Common Ground conference. In 2019, Katz became chief executive officer of Diet ID, a nutrition assessment company he founded.

== Media ==
Katz has written for The New York Times, The Wall Street Journal, and other publications. He was a nutrition columnist for O, The Oprah Magazine (2002–2010), an on-air medical contributor for ABC News (2005–2007), and a health editor and contributor at The Huffington Post (2010–2017). He was also among LinkedIn's original 150 "Influencers" and wrote a weekly preventive medicine column for the New Haven Register for about 25 years beginning in 1996, syndicated through The New York Times.

In March 2020, Katz published opinion pieces in The New York Times and The Wall Street Journal advocating risk-stratified protection rather than broad lockdowns during the COVID-19 pandemic. He promoted a public health approach of "total harm minimization" and general health promotion, volunteered during the New York City surge, and briefly provided frontline clinical care in a Bronx emergency department.

In May 2020, he testified before the United States Senate Committee on Homeland Security and Governmental Affairs on the federal pandemic response. He was invited to the White House that year to discuss pandemic policies but declined. Katz is a co-signatory of the Great Barrington Declaration. His later pandemic commentary in the American Journal of Health Promotion was named among the journal's "Best Papers" of 2024.

== Nutrition ==
Katz is an advocate of diets that are "plant-predominant" such as vegan, vegetarian, pescetarian and the Mediterranean diet. He has stated that the "best diets for human health are whole food plant predominant, so all of us should be eating plenty of plant foods". Katz has noted that it is long established that improving diet quality can reduce the risk of chronic disease and premature death.

In his personal life, Katz adheres to the plant-predominant dietary pattern he espouses for reasons of health, ethics, and environmentalism. He gave up eating red meat for ethical and environmental reasons. He has commented that "a good vegan diet is not the only option for health promotion, but it is among the best".

His book How to Eat: All Your Food and Diet Questions Answered, co-authored with food journalist Mark Bittman, was published in 2020. It promotes a plant-predominant diet.

== Awards and honors ==
Katz has received honorary doctorates from the University of Bridgeport, Quinnipiac University, and Bastyr University, and has repeatedly been a supported nominee for U.S. Surgeon General. Recent recognitions include a Lifetime Achievement Award from the Doctors' World Gala (2023), the President's Award from the American College of Lifestyle Medicine (2024), induction into Sigma Xi (2025), and the Leadership Award from the Integrative Healthcare Symposium (2026). He was a 2019 James Beard Foundation Award nominee in health journalism.

In 2011, he received the Katharine Boucot Sturgis Award from the American College of Preventive Medicine and the Lenna Frances Cooper Award from the American Dietetic Association. He was the Kosuna Distinguished Lecturer in Nutrition at the University of California, Davis, in 2019 and delivered the J. Warren Perry Lecture at the University at Buffalo.

In 2026, he delivered the inaugural endowed lecture on nutrition at Harvard Medical School's Osher Center.

=== Patents ===
- Katz, David L. Oto-nasal foreign body extractor. U.S. Patent 5,454,817, October 3, 1995.
- Katz, David L.; Rhee, Lauren. Diet mapping processes and systems to optimize diet quality and/or minimize environmental impact. U.S. Patent 11,328,810, May 10, 2022.

== Personal life ==
Katz is married to Catherine (Sananès) Katz and has five children.

== Selected publications ==
Articles

- Katz, D.L. (2004). Lifestyle and Dietary Modification for Prevention of Heart Failure. Medical Clinics of North America 88(5): 1295–1320, 2004.
- Hartwig, K.A., Dunville, R.L., Kim, M.H., Levy, B., Zaharek, M.M., Yanchou Njike, V., and Katz, D.L. (2006). Promoting Healthy People 2010 through Small Grants. Health Promotion Practice 2009, Volume: 10 issue: 1, page(s): 24–33 https://doi.org/10.1177/1524839906289048
- Katz, D.L., O'Connell, M., Yeh, M.C., Nawaz, H., Njike, V., Anderson, L.M., Cory, S., and Dietz, W. Public Health Strategies for Preventing and Controlling Overweight and Obesity in School and Worksite Settings: A Report on Recommendations of the Task Force on Community Preventive Services. Morbidity and Mortality Weekly Report 54(RR-10): 1–12, 2005.
- Katz, D.L. (2019). Plant-Based Diets for Reversing Disease and Saving the Planet: Past, Present, and Future. Advances in Nutrition 1: 10(Suppl_4):S304-S307.

Books

- Elmore, Joann G.; Wild, Dorothea; Nelson, Heidi D.; Katz, David L.. Jekel's Epidemiology, Biostatistics, Preventive Medicine, and Public Health. 5th ed. Elsevier, 2020.
- Katz, David L. Clinical Epidemiology and Evidence-Based Medicine: Fundamental Principles of Clinical Reasoning and Research. Lippincott Williams & Wilkins.
- Katz, D.L., Bittman, M. (2020). How to Eat: All Your Food and Diet Questions Answered. Harvest. ISBN 978-0358128823
- Katz, D.L. (2022). Nutrition in Clinical Practice. LWW. ISBN 978-1975161491
