= Sammy Rae & The Friends =

American jazz-pop band from Brooklyn

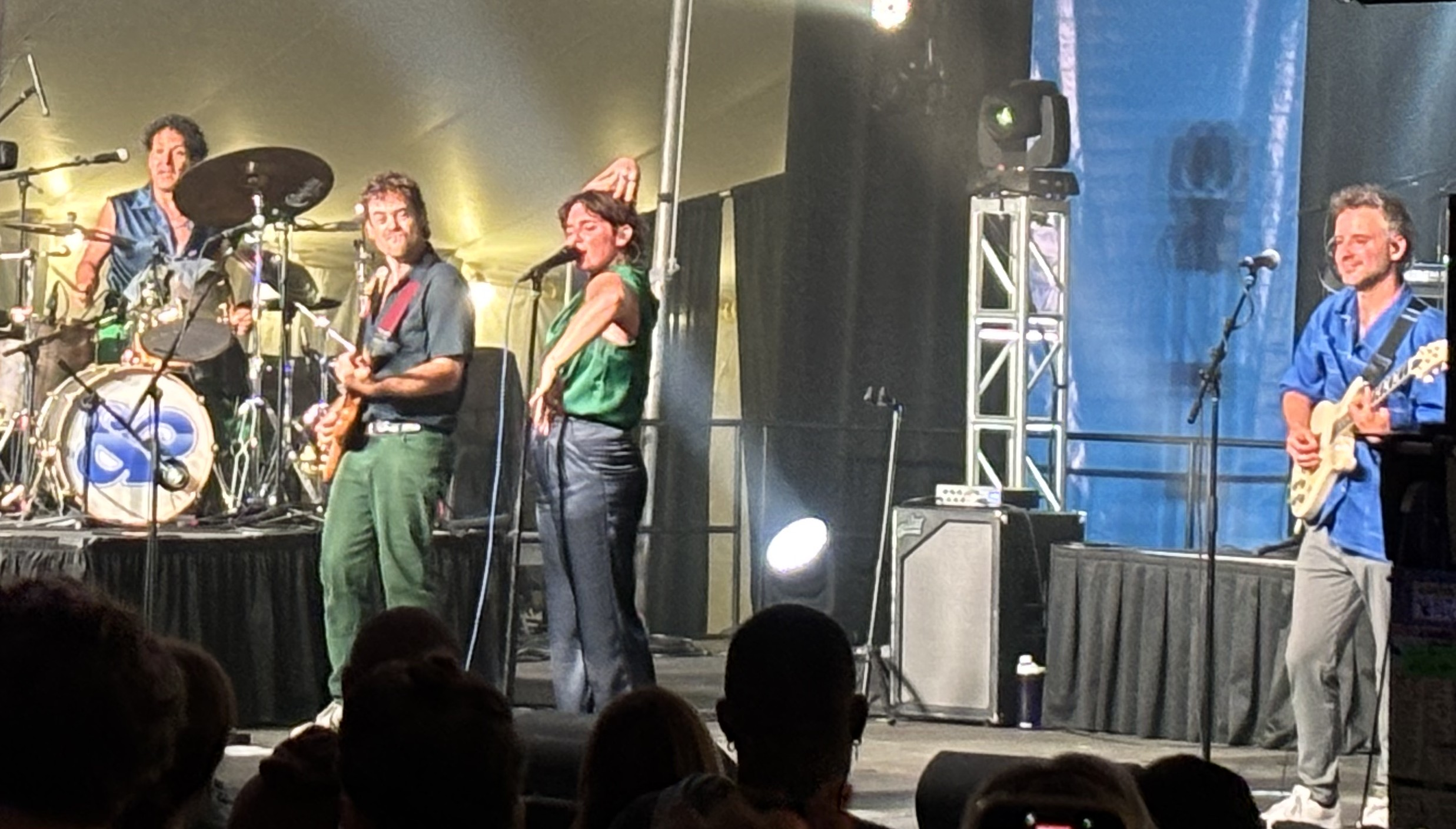
- Sammy Rae & The Friends playing at the 2025 NC Folk Fest

Background information
- Origin: Brooklyn, New York City, U.S.
- Genres: Soul; Jazz-pop; Indie-pop
- Years active: 2016–present
- Label: Nettwerk
- Members: Sammy Rae – lead vocals; C-Bass Chiriboga – drums; James Quinlan – bass; Will Leet – guitar; Debbie Tjong – keyboards; Max Zooi – tenor sax, synths
- Website: www.sammyrae.com

Sammy Rae & The Friends is an American jazz-pop band from Brooklyn, New York City, led by singer-songwriter Samantha "Sammy Rae" Bowers. Formed in 2016, the group is known for high-energy live shows; in February 2024 they played two sold-out nights at Washington, D.C.’s 9:30 Club. Their debut studio album, Something for Everybody, was released on September 20, 2024, via Nettwerk, following the EPs The Good Life (2018) and Let's Throw a Party (2021).

The band has released two albums, one live album, and two EPs. Bowers' musical style is influenced by funk, jazz, rock, folk, and pop.

== History ==
Singer Samantha Bowers assembled the Friends in New York after moving to the city in her late teens; early shows and singles in 2018 led to a rapid live following and a sold-out hometown EP release show for The Good Life. A 2020 Boston Globe profile described the ensemble as a “musical community” with horns, rhythm section and backing vocalists, noting sellouts and expanded touring around the Northeast.

In 2024 the band's U.S. touring included two sold-out dates at the 9:30 Club in Washington, D.C., and European festival appearances such as North Sea Jazz in Rotterdam. The group also appeared in a national public radio mini-concert segment in 2025.

On July 23, 2025, the band released a surprise covers album, Songs We Wish We Wrote.

== Musical style and influences ==
Coverage often describes the group's sound as a blend of jazz, soul, rock and pop with an emphasis on ensemble interplay and audience participation.

In interviews, bandleader Samantha “Sammy Rae” Bowers has cited classic “big-band” rock acts as touchstones—particularly Bruce Springsteen and the E Street Band—and named artists such as Queen (Freddie Mercury), Fleetwood Mac and the Beatles among formative influences.

== Members ==
- Sammy Rae – lead vocals
- C-Bass Chiriboga – drums
- James Quinlan – bass guitar
- Will Leet – guitar
- Debbie Tjong – keyboards
- Max Zooi – tenor saxophone; synthesizers
- Former member: Kellon Reese – alto saxophone

=== Sammy Rae ===
Sammy Rae
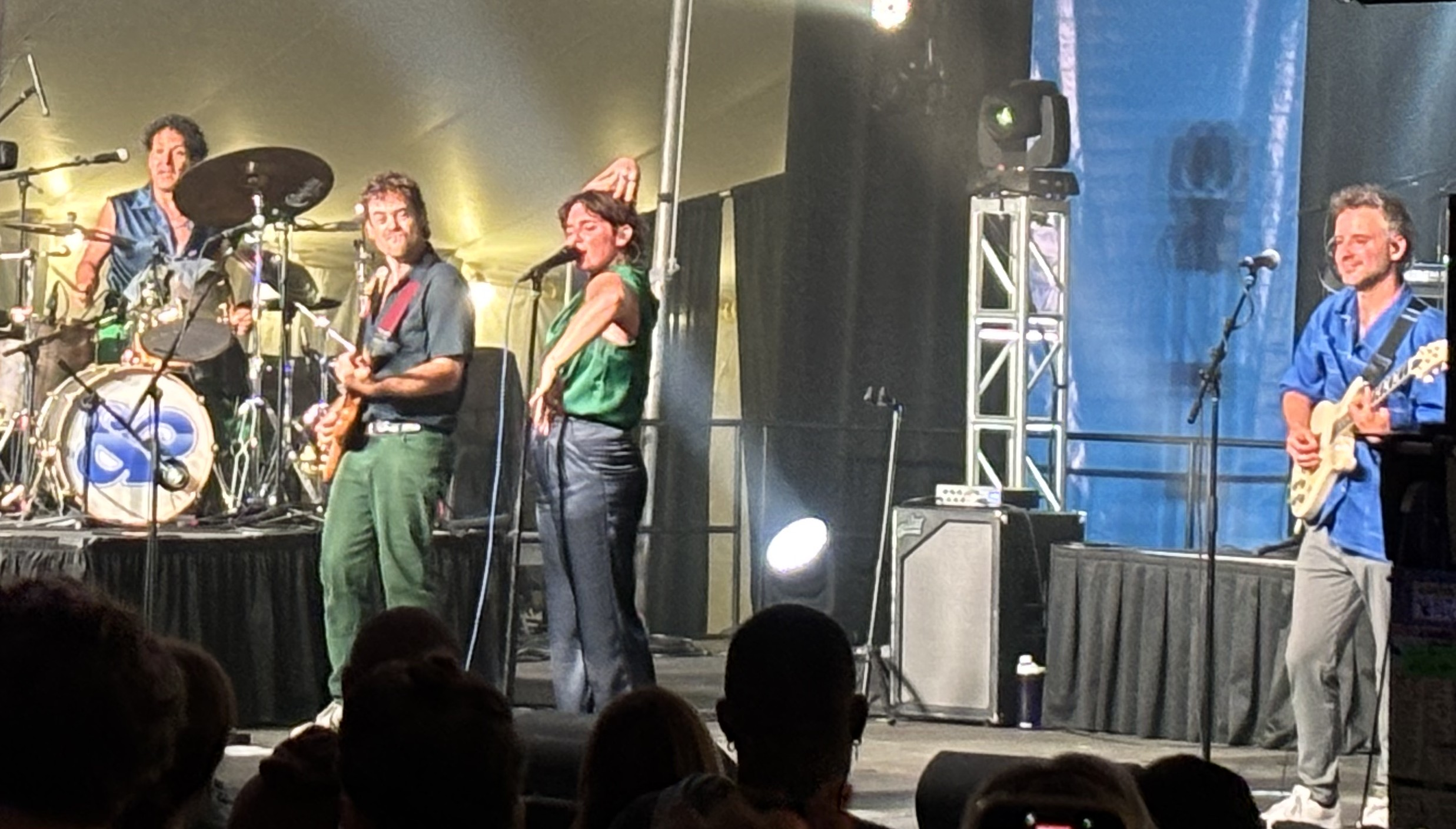
- Sammy Rae & The Friends playing at the 2025 NC Folk Fest

Background information
- Born: Samantha Rae Bowers; January 4, 1994 (age 32); Derby, Connecticut, U.S.
- Genres: Soul; jazz pop; indie pop
- Occupations: Singer; songwriter
- Instruments: Vocals; piano; ukulele; banjo; guitar
- Years active: 2016–present
- Labels: Nettwerk; WMG; BMI
- Website: sammyrae.com

Samantha Rae Bowers (born January 4, 1994), known professionally as Sammy Rae, is an American musician and the leader of Sammy Rae & The Friends.

==== Early life ====
Rae was born in Derby, Connecticut on January 4, 1994. Rae enjoyed singing from a very young age, starting with nursery rhymes as a toddler. When she was young, her parents fostered her interest in the arts, taking her to participate in a children's theatre company in Shelton, after-school choirs, and piano lessons. She realized that she wanted to be a songwriter at the age of 12 after watching a segment on VH1 about Bruce Springsteen. When she was 15, she played her first show. She attended Sacred Heart Academy, a private, all-girls Catholic high school with uniform requirements and little chance for self-expression, where she was a member of the art scene. She then attended the University of New Haven for one year studying sound engineering and audio technology. In 2013, at the age of 19, Rae moved to New York City to pursue songwriting and study music and teaching at Manhattan College. She dropped out in 2014 and worked waiting tables while pursuing music in her free time.

==== Career ====
Rae took up a six-month residency at the Cotton Club jazz lounge in Harlem, while regularly singing at open mic shows and writing and recording her own songs. It was during this period that she met the six other musicians who became her bandmates in 2016. At this time, she was also a member of folk-rock band "Newcomers Club". In November 2016, she released her first album, Sugar, with 10-tracks recorded at Flux Studios on the Lower East Side. She later deleted the album, claiming it was "off-brand".

In 2018, her band, Sammy Rae & The Friends, released their EP The Good Life, followed in 2021 by their EP Let's Throw a Party. In 2021, the band was selected for the American Music Abroad program. Through 2021 and 2022, the band gained popularity on Spotify, partly due to being featured on the platform's "Discover Weekly" playlist.

The band released their debut studio album, Something For Everybody, on September 20, 2024.

==== Influences ====
Rae stated she was influenced by church music (particularly gospel music) and classic rock, as well as Bob Dylan and Paul Simon for vocals, and the E Street Band for their group dynamics. The band's style is influenced by the diverse musical backgrounds of all its members, with genres such as jazz, rock, funk, folk, theater, and world music.

==== Personal life ====
Rae is queer. As such, her music often includes themes of queer and female empowerment. This is most apparent in their song "Jackie Onassis," which Rae has stated is "a love song to my first crushes, and it’s also a love song to all young women."

In July 2026 Sammy and her guitar player Will Leet were married in Woodstock, NY.

== Discography ==
=== EPs ===
Release date	Name
July 20, 2018	The Good Life
January 22, 2021	Let's Throw A Party

=== Albums ===
Release date	Name
May 27, 2013	Celebrate my Heart
November 4, 2016	Sugar
August 11, 2023	The If It All Goes South Tour (Live)
September 20, 2024	Something For Everybody
July 23, 2025	Songs We Wish We Wrote
March 13, 2026	SUN

=== Singles ===
Title	Year	Peak chart positions	Album
Title	Year	US AAA	Album
"Thieves" (with The Friends)	2024	34	Something for Everybody

== Tours ==
Headlining

- Follow Me Like The Moon Tour (2021)
- If It All Goes South (2022)
- CAMP: The Tour! (2023)
- Something For Everybody (2024–2025)
- Get Down Tour (2026)

== Notable performances ==
- October 7, 2021 — New York City, NY; Brooklyn Steel: sold-out hometown show.
- February 16–17, 2024 — Washington, D.C.; 9:30 Club: two sold-out shows.
- July 12, 2024 — Rotterdam, Netherlands; North Sea Jazz Festival.
- December 31, 2024 — Washington, D.C.; The Anthem: New Year's Eve performance.
- June 29, 2025 — Hartford, CT; The Capitol Groove festival.
- July 27, 2025 — Newport, RI; Newport Folk Festival.
- September 13, 2025 — Louisville, KY; Bourbon & Beyond: evening slot; joined the all-star finale with Ringo Starr.
