= Osborne Homestead Museum =

Historic house in Connecticut, United States

- U.S. National Register of Historic Places
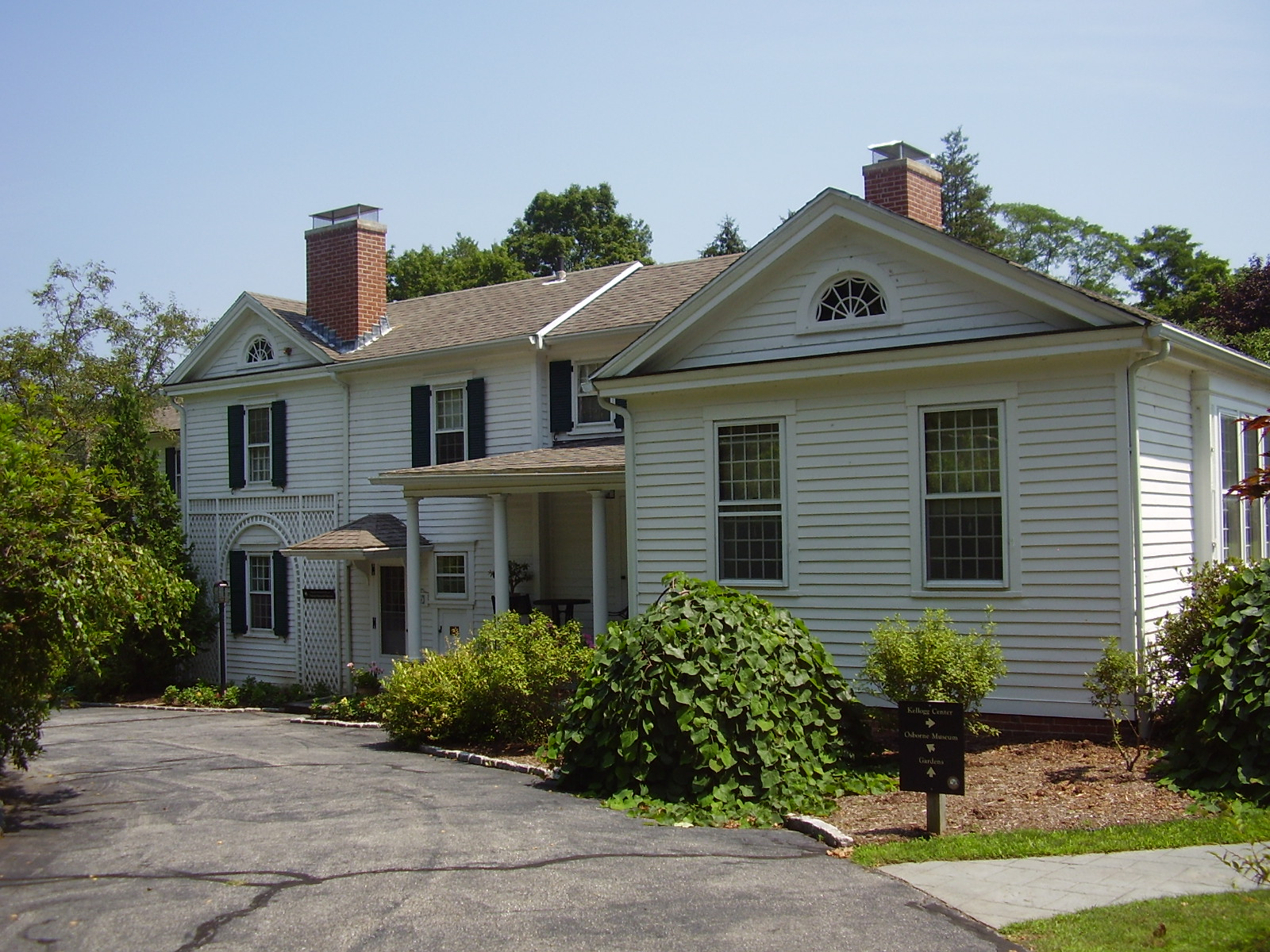
- Osborne Homestead Museum in 2008

- Location within Connecticut Location within the United States
- Location: 500 Hawthorne Avenue, Derby, Connecticut
- Coordinates: 41°20′3.4″N 73°6′40.5″W
- Area: 8 acres (3.2 ha)
- Built: 1840
- Architect: Waldo Kellogg
- Architectural style: Greek Revival, Tudor Revival
- Website: Osborne Homestead Museum
- NRHP reference No.: 86001256
- Added to NRHP: June 13, 1986

The Osborne Homestead is a two-story Colonial Revival house located in Osbornedale State Park, in the Derby Neck section of the city of Derby, Connecticut. The homestead is listed on the National Register of Historic Places and is operated as a museum by the State of Connecticut. It is significant for being the home of Frances Osborne Kellogg, a proponent for equal professional opportunities for women in Connecticut.

== History ==
The house was originally built as a farmhouse in 1840 in the Greek Revival style. Little is known about the first occupants. In 1867, Wilbur Osborne, who owned and ran several industries in Derby, Ansonia and Bridgeport, and his wife, Ellen Lucy Davis, moved to the house. The couple ran a dairy farm in the surrounding land. Their sole surviving daughter, Frances, took over after her father's death and became a prominent businesswoman – president of the Union Fabric Co., vice president of Connecticut Clasp, treasurer of the F. Kelly Company, and a founding partner of Steels and Busks, Ltd. Of Leicester, England. She married Waldo Stewart Kellogg in 1919, and he took charge of the dairy, using selective breeding to make the herd "famous throughout New England for quality milk production." Waldo Kellogg enlarged and remodeled the house to its current form between 1919 and 1925.

Waldo Kellogg died in 1928 but Frances stayed in the house until her death in 1956. Just before she died, she deeded her entire 350-acre (140 ha) estate, including Osbornedale, to the State of Connecticut.

The state now operates the house and grounds as the Osborne Homestead Museum; the surrounding land comprises Osbornedale State Park.

The house was added to the National Register of Historic Places on June 13, 1986.

== See also ==
- National Register of Historic Places listings in New Haven County, Connecticut
