= Sterling Piano Company =

Piano manufacturer in Derby, Connecticut

- Industry: Piano designing/manufacturing
- Founded: 1866
- Founder: Charles A. Sterling
- Defunct: 1967
- Headquarters: Derby, Connecticut, United States
- Products: Pianos

The Sterling Piano Company was a piano manufacturer in Derby, Connecticut. The company was founded in 1873 by Charles A. Sterling as the Sterling Organ Company. Sterling had purchased the Birmingham Organ Company in 1871 and had $30,000 to fund the company. The Sterling Organ Company began making pianos in 1885. By the early 20th century the company had its headquarters in Brooklyn, New York, and operated factories in both Derby and Shelton, Connecticut.

In its early years, Sterling produced both pianos and organs, but ceased organ production in favor of the more popular piano after the first couple of decades in business. The company built several different piano names including Mendelssohn, Huntington, Goetz & Co., Richardson and Lohmann. The pianos of this era were known to be very high quality instruments, rivaling many other prominent builders of the day. Although the company manufactured grand pianos, it was mainly well known for high-end uprights, or "Cabinet Grand Pianos". After the Great Depression, Sterling merged with the Winter Piano Company, and the Sterling name was retained until the 1960s.
