= Osbornedale State Park =

Park in New Haven County, Connecticut, United States

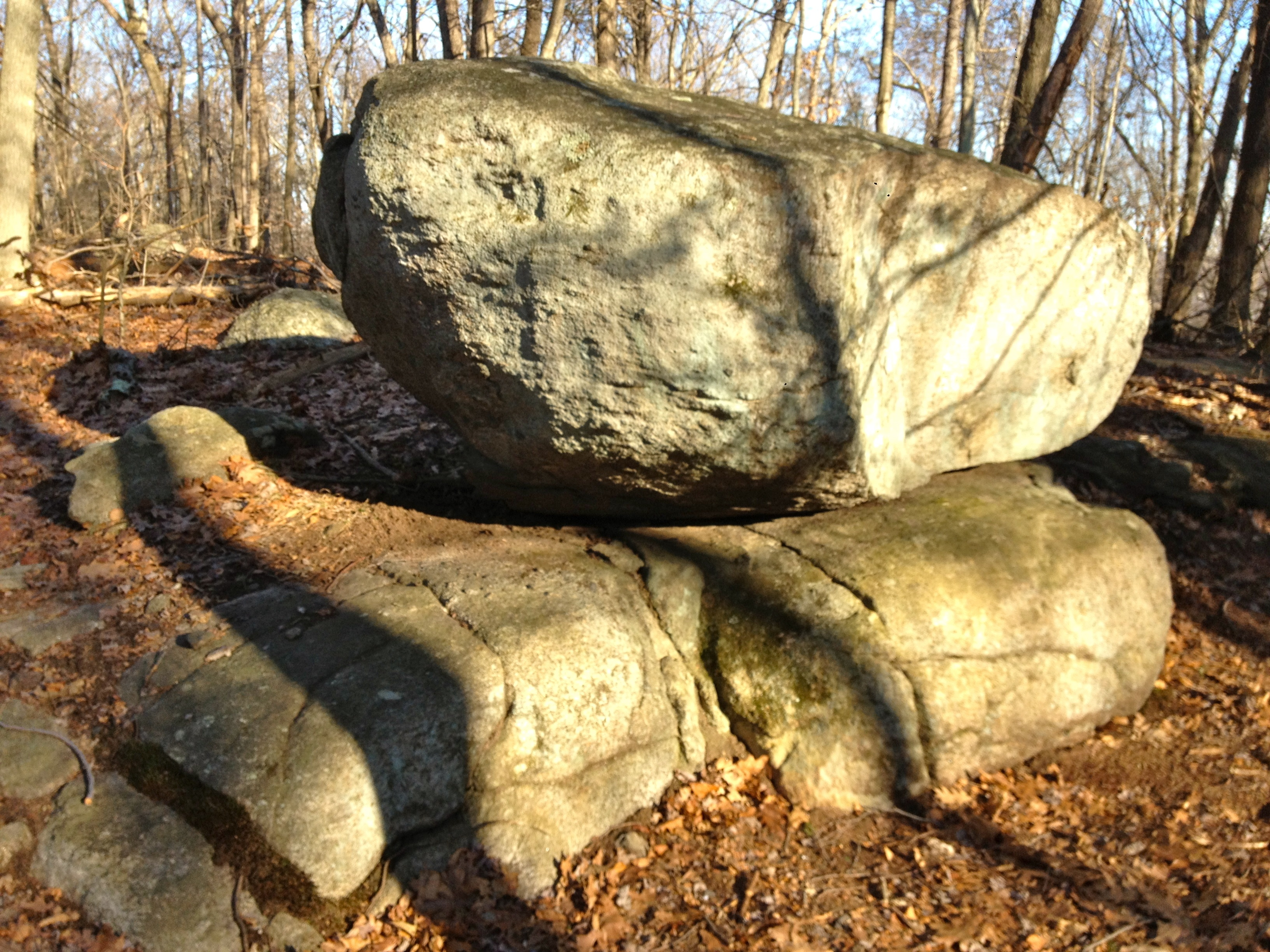
- One of the park's glacial erratics

- Location within Connecticut Location within the United States
- Location: Derby, Connecticut, United States
- Coordinates: 41°20′10″N 73°06′02″W
- Area: 417 acres (169 ha)
- Elevation: 200 ft (61 m)
- Established: 1956
- Administrator: Connecticut Department of Energy and Environmental Protection
- Designation: Connecticut state park
- Website: Official website

Osbornedale State Park is a public recreation area occupying 417 acres (169 ha) on the east bank of the Housatonic River primarily in the town of Derby, Connecticut, with a small portion in Ansonia. The state park includes the historic Osborne Homestead, the Kellogg Environmental Center, and an extensive system of hiking trails. The park is managed by the Connecticut Department of Energy and Environmental Protection.

== History ==
The park was formerly the estate of the Osborne family, the owners of metalworking and textile product factories in the Naugatuck Valley area. Frances Osborne Kellogg and her husband, Waldo Kellogg, assembled the property through the acquisition of several farms. The Kelloggs operated two successful farming operations on the land under the name of Osbornedale Farms. One farm specialized in breeding Osbornedale Holstein cows and the other produced milk from a herd of Jersey cows. Prior uses of the park land included silver mining in the years after the American Revolutionary War and bottling of spring water. The 350-acre (140 ha) estate was given to the state of Connecticut by Frances Osborne Kellogg upon her death in 1956.

== Activities and amenities ==
The park preserves the historic Osbornedale house, which offers tours, as well as an adjacent property that is part of the state's resident curator program. The Kellogg Environmental Center offers educational programs. Hiking trails, a pond for fishing and ice skating, and picnicking facilities are also available.
