= Harcourt Wood Memorial Library =

- U.S. National Register of Historic Places
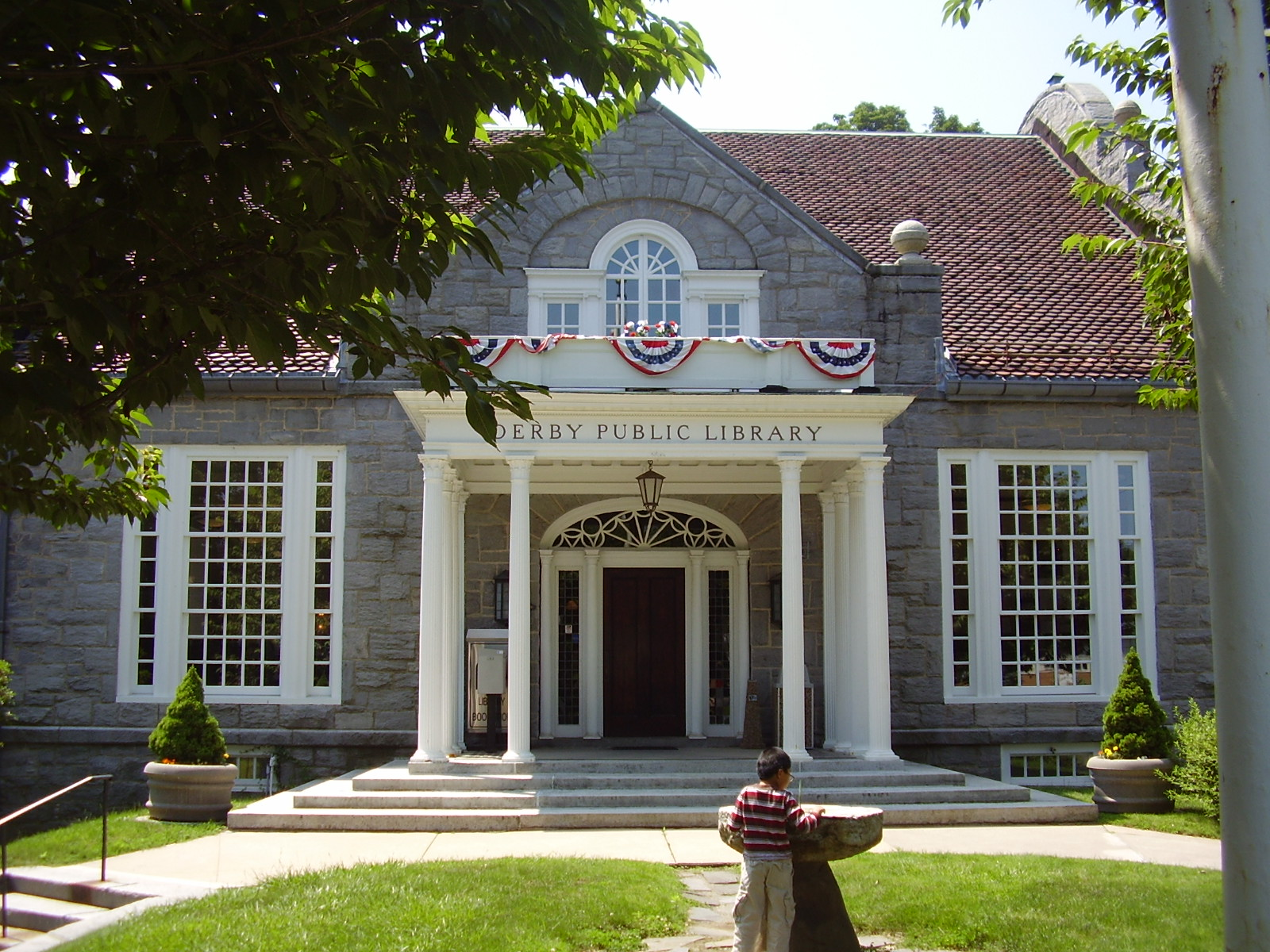

- Location within Connecticut Location within the United States
- Location: 313 Elizabeth Street, Derby, Connecticut
- Coordinates: 41°19′36″N 73°5′20″W
- Area: 0.5 acres (0.20 ha)
- Built: 1902
- Architect: Hartley Dennett
- Architectural style: Colonial Revival
- NRHP reference No.: 82004348
- Added to NRHP: January 4, 1982

Harcourt Wood Memorial Library (also known as the Derby Public Library) is a historic public library at 313 Elizabeth Street in Derby, Connecticut. Built in 1902, it is a fine local example of Colonial Revival architecture, funded by the local streetcar railway owner. It was added to the National Register of Historic Places in 1982.

== Architecture and history ==
Derby's main public library building is located a few blocks from the downtown, on a triangular lot formed by Elizabeth and Caroline Streets. It is a single story structure, with a frame concrete and steel, with walls built primarily out of Ansonia granite and brick. The main facade is three bays wide, with large multipane windows in the outer bays, flanking the main entrance. The entrance, flanked by sidelights and topped by an eyebrow window, is sheltered by an elaborate multi-column Colonial Revival portico. A stone gable rises above the portico, flush with the main wall, its end caps topped by round finials. The side walls take the distinctive rounded shape of Flemish gables, with the ends and crown also topped by round finials. The interior retains most of its original woodwork and many of its original furnishings.

Derby's first library, a small reading room, was founded in 1868. This building was built in 1902 following the donation of land and funds for its construction by H. Holton Wood, a native of Montreal who made his fortune operating Derby's streetcar railway system. The library is named in honor of Wood's son Harcourt, who died at the age of 12 in 1897. The building was designed by Boston architect Hartley Dennett. There is no evidence that the library was built on land donated by the Sarah Riggs Humphreys Chapter of the Daughters of the American Revolution.

== See also ==
- National Register of Historic Places listings in New Haven County, Connecticut
