= Edward Wooster =

Edward Wooster (c. 1622 in England – July 8, 1689) was an English early settler of Colonial America, and "the first permanent settler in Derby", Connecticut.

In 1642, Wooster enters the record as one of the first colonists of Milford, Connecticut. In 1651, he received permission to settle an area known as "Paugussett". In 1669, he was appointed constable of Paugussett. He served the settlement in a variety of ways, but earned the nickname (and a bounty from the town) as the "wolf killer" for helping to drive the predators out of the area. In 1659, he petitioned the court in New Haven for pay for the seven wolves he had killed in or near "Paugassett" which was what Derby was called at that point. Ironically, Wooster lived in the area at a time when the court in New Haven was still having concerns about the future of the area and considering possibly removing Wooster and anyone else in the area because of the failure to make progress on settling the area.

Edward Wooster died on July 8, 1689. Wooster's tombstone in Derby states:

In memory of Edward Wooster 1622–1689
The first permanent settler in Derby — 1651 —
"The wilderness and the solitary place shall be glad for them
and the desert shall rejoice and blossom as the rose"
