= Andy Natowich =

American football player (1918–2014)

No. 46
- Position: Running back

Personal information
- Born: December 11, 1918; Derby, Connecticut, U.S.
- Died: October 30, 2014 (aged 95); Brattleboro, Vermont, U.S.

Career information
- College: Holy Cross

Career history
- 1944: Washington Redskins
- Stats at Pro Football Reference

Andrew J. Natowich (December 11, 1918 – October 30, 2014) was an American football running back in the National Football League for the Washington Redskins. Born in Derby, Connecticut, he played college football at the College of the Holy Cross. He died in a hospital at Brattleboro, Vermont in 2014, aged 95.
