= John I. Howe House =

Historic house in Connecticut, United States

- U.S. National Register of Historic Places
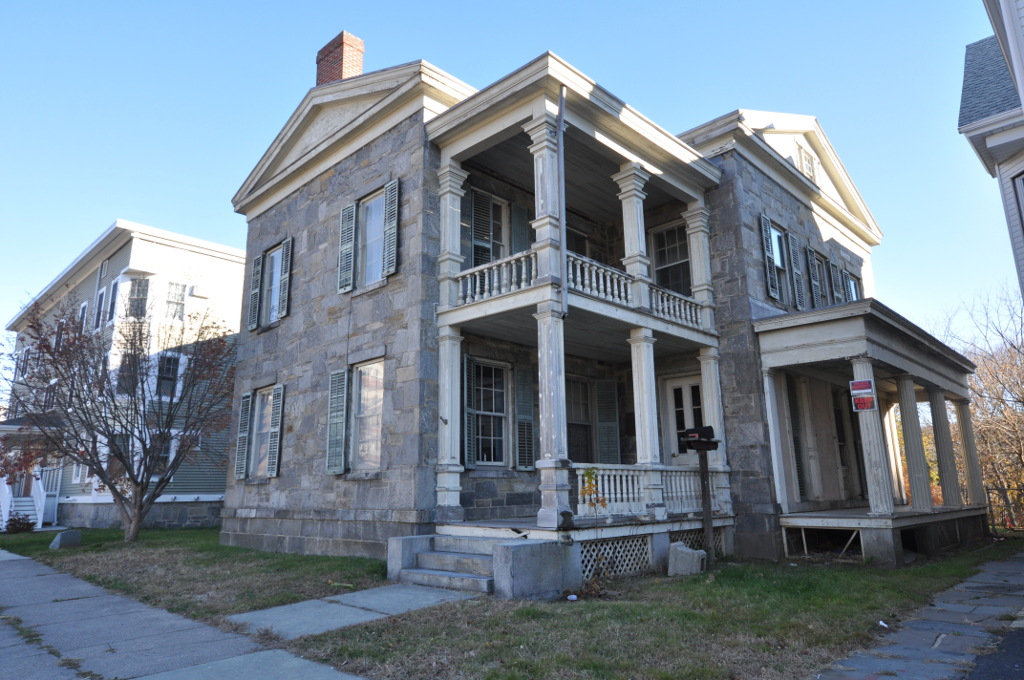
- The house in 2016

- Location within Connecticut Location within the United States
- Location: 213 Caroline Street, Derby, CT
- Coordinates: 41°19′23″N 73°5′15″W
- Built: 1845
- Built by: Lucius Hubbell
- Architectural style: Greek Revival
- NRHP reference No.: 88003229
- Added to NRHP: February 6, 1989

The John I. Howe House is a historic house at 213 Caroline Street in Derby, Connecticut. Built in 1845, it is a distinctive example of Greek Revival architecture executed in granite, built for John Ireland Howe of the Howe Pin Company. It was listed on the National Register of Historic Places in 1989.

== Description ==
The John I. Howe House is located north of the commercial downtown of Derby, on the east side of Caroline Street north of 5th Street. It is a 2 1/2-story masonry structure, built with loadbearing granite walls. It has a cruciform plan, with a main block covered by a gabled roof oriented north–south, and gabled projections at the centers of the eastern and western facades. The house is an outstanding example of Greek Revival architecture implemented in masonry. Gable ends are finished in wood, and are pedimented. Windows are set in rectangular openings with granite sills and lintels. A two-story porch, a recreation of the original based on photographs, occupies the front right corner.

== History ==
John Ireland Howe was a native of Ridgefield, who developed machinery for the manufacturing of straight metal pins, a process that had previously been done by hand. Originally based in upstate New York, Howe moved the business to Derby in 1838. Howe is revered as one of Connecticut's foremost nineteenth-century inventors.

In 1989 the owners, the Derby Historical Society, had plans for major rehabilitation of the house so that it could be used as a museum of industry. In 2016, the Derby Historical Society still owned the home, was planning for a third round of renovation, and hoped for it to become the Lower Naugatuck Valley Industrial Heritage Center, a museum to be open to the public. It has been hoped that one of Howe's pin-making machines, on display at the Smithsonian Institution in Washington, D.C., could be returned to Derby for permanent display at the museum.

== See also ==
- National Register of Historic Places listings in New Haven County, Connecticut
