= Yale-Griffin Prevention Research Center =

US research center

- Abbreviation: PRC
- Formation: 1998
- Type: Academic research center
- Purpose: Preventing chronic diseases
- Headquarters: Griffin Hospital, Derby, Connecticut
- Principal investigator: Rafael Perez-Escamilla
- Directors: Kathleen O'Connor Duffany and Beth Comerford
- Main organ: Griffin Hospital, Yale School of Public Health
- Website: www.yalegriffinprc.org

The Yale-Griffin Prevention Research Center is one of the Centers for Disease Control (CDC)'s 26 Prevention Research Centers. It was established in 1998 with a grant from the CDC. It is part of the Yale School of Public Health, and is based at Griffin Hospital in Derby, Connecticut. It also operates out of the Community Alliance for Research Engagement at Yale University. Its focuses are the prevention and treatment of chronic diseases such as obesity and heart disease.
