= Derby Silver Company =

Manufacturing Company

- Founded: 1872
- Defunct: 1933
- Headquarters: Derby, Connecticut; Shelton, Connecticut, United States
- Area served: Internationally
- Products: silver products, hollowware and flatware
- Divisions: Victor Silver Company

In 1872, the Derby Silver Company began production in Derby, CT. Over the years, the company made bathroom-related items, clocks, tableware and flatware, tea sets, candlesticks, fruit baskets, dishes, and more object types made of silver and silver plate. The Derby Silver Company operated showrooms in New York, Chicago, and San Francisco. As of 1893, the President and Manager of the company was Watson J. Miller. Wesley L. Clark was the Secretary and Treasurer.

In 1898, the company became a division of the International Silver Company headquartered in Meriden, CT, but continued making silver with its brand name until 1933, when the plant was closed.

Derby Silver Company designs are in a variety of museum collections including the Brooklyn Museum; Mint Museum in Charlotte, NC; the Museum of Fine Arts, Boston; the Wolfsonian-FIU in Miami Beach; and the Yale University Art Gallery in New Haven, CT.

Over the years, Derby Silver Company designs have been in exhibitions including the 1876 Centennial Exposition in Philadelphia; In pursuit of beauty: Americans and the Aesthetic Movement at the Metropolitan Museum of Art in New York (1986-87); Silver in America, 1840-1940: A century of splendor at the Dallas Museum of Art (1994-95); and Shaken, stirred, styled: The art of the cocktail also at the Dallas Museum (2016-17).
