= Birmingham Green Historic District =

Historic district in Connecticut, United States

- U.S. National Register of Historic Places
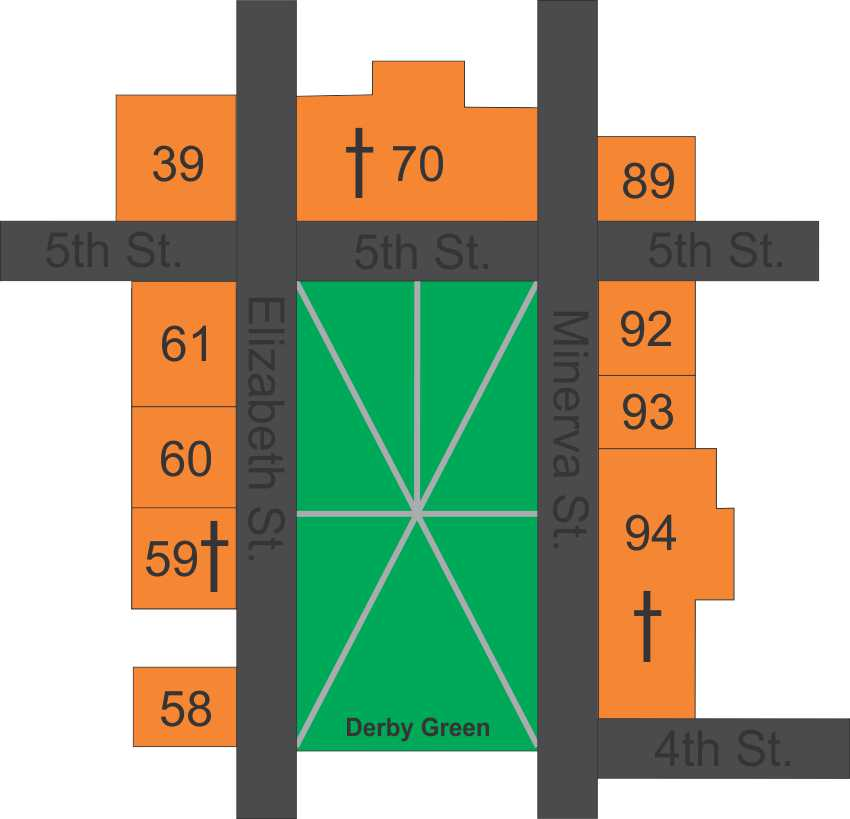

- Location within Connecticut Location within the United States
- Location: Central Derby, CT
- Coordinates: 41°19′20″N 73°5′20″W
- Area: 6.6 acres (2.7 ha)
- Built: 1836
- Architect: Smith & Phelps
- Architectural style: Greek Revival, Gothic Revival, more
- NRHP reference No.: 00000325
- Added to NRHP: April 21, 2000

The Birmingham Green Historic District is located in central Derby, Connecticut just north of the central business district. Also known as the Derby Green Historic District, the district consists of the Green and the buildings surrounding it on the east, north, and west sides. A total of 10 buildings, 3 of which are churches, and 4 monuments encompass the district. It was listed on the National Register of Historic Places in 2000 as a good example of privately organized 19th century urban planning.

== Description and history ==
The town of Derby was settled in 1651 and incorporated in 1775. Originally much larger in size than today, several neighboring communities broke off from the town during the 18th and 19th centuries, reducing it to one of Connecticut's smallest municipalities by area. The point to the north of the confluence of the Naugatuck and Housatonic Rivers was privately developed in the 1830s by Anson Phelps and Sheldon Smith, businessmen who sought to revive the city's flagging economy with industrial development. Their development plans included a parcel designated as the Public Square, which later became known as Birmingham Green and Derby Green. Phelps and Smith were effective in moving significant civic functions from the town center of the period (Derby Landing, on the east side of the river) to this new area, with the three churches flanking the green moving in 1837, 1843, and 1845.

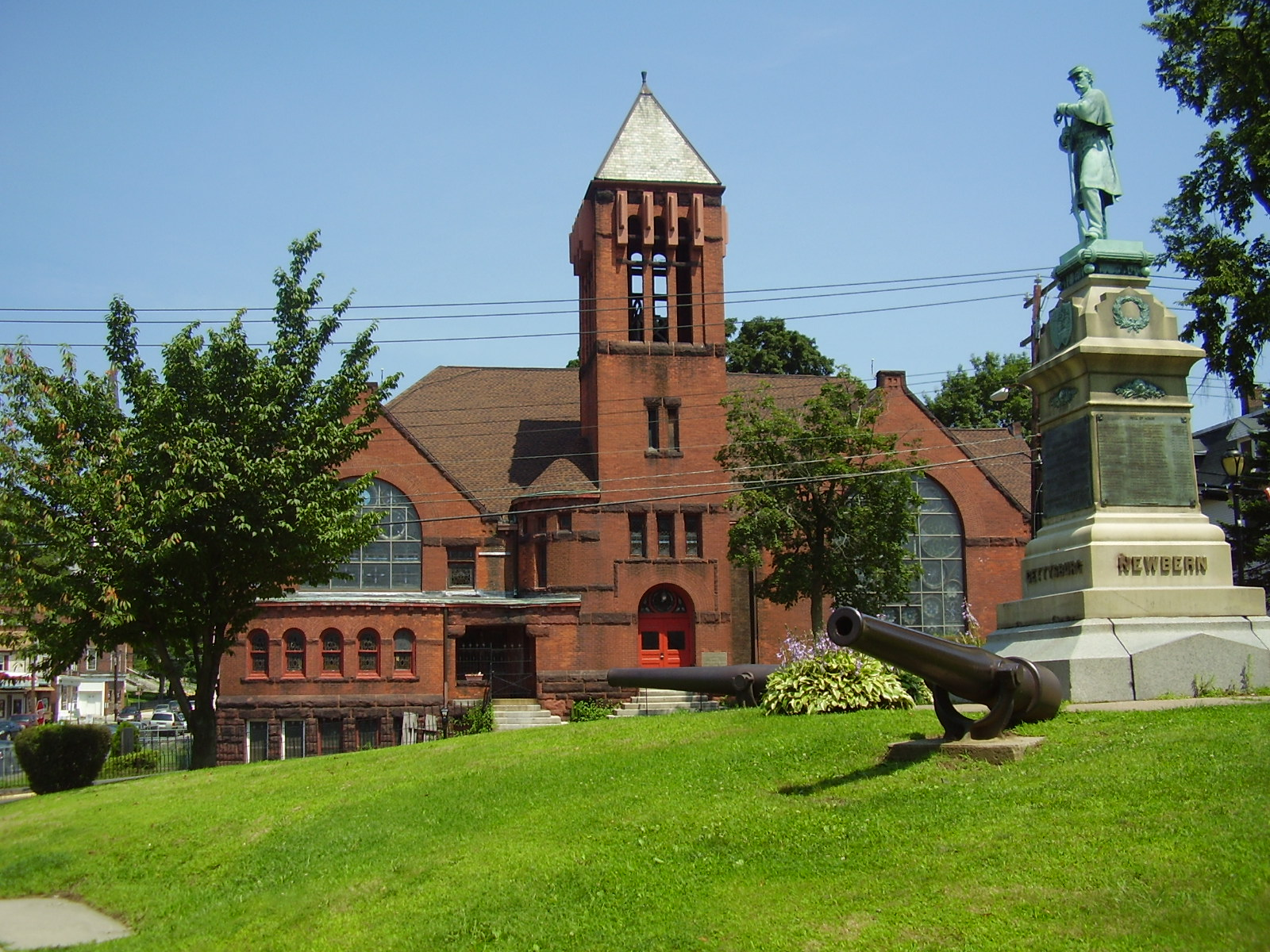
The Methodist Church and war memorial

The Derby Green is 1.8 acres (0.73 ha) in size and rectangular in shape. It is bounded on the north by Fifth Street, the east by Minerva Street and the west by Elizabeth Street. Its southern boundary runs parallel to Fourth Street. Approximately half the street frontage flanking the green is lined by churches and their associated parsonages and rectories. The other main civic building is the Sterling Opera House, built in 1889 on Elizabeth Street to a design by H. Edwards Ficken.

== See also ==
- National Register of Historic Places listings in New Haven County, Connecticut
