= Sterling Opera House =

- U.S. National Register of Historic Places
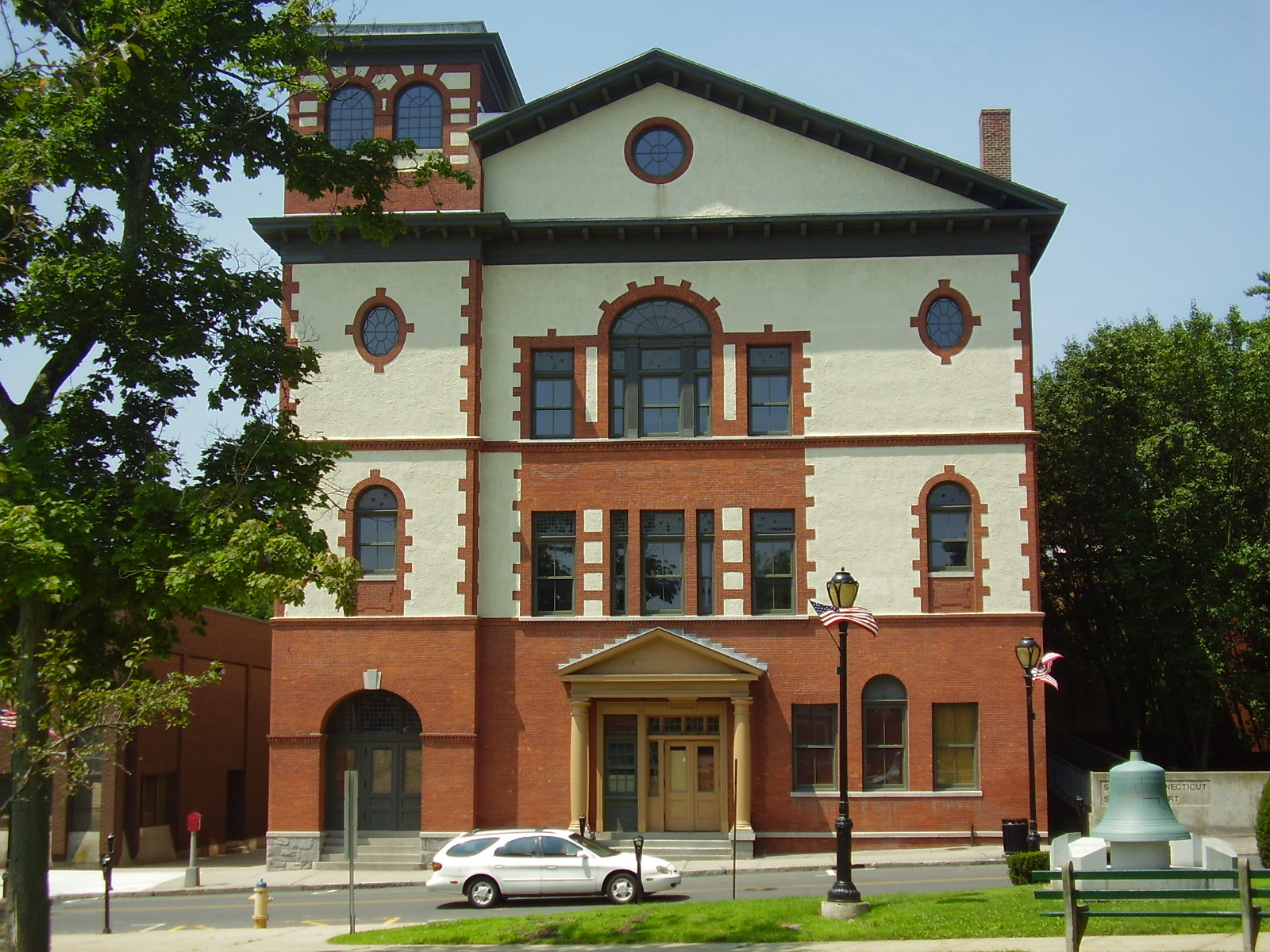
- Sterling Opera House in 2009

- Location within Connecticut Location within the United States
- Location: 112 Elizabeth Street Derby, Connecticut
- Coordinates: 41°19′18″N 73°5′24″W
- Built: 1889
- Architect: H. Edwards Ficken
- Architectural style: Italianate
- NRHP reference No.: 68000040
- Added to NRHP: November 8, 1968

The Sterling Opera House is located in Derby, Connecticut, at 112 Elizabeth Street, across from the Derby Green. The building is located within the Birmingham Green Historic District which comprises a total of 10 buildings, 3 of which are churches, and 4 monuments. The building was constructed in 1889 and was added to the National Register of Historic Places on November 8, 1968, making it the first building in Connecticut to be listed on the National Register of Historic Places. The Sterling Opera House served multiple municipal purposes as a city hall and police station as well as an opera house when it opened on April 2, 1889. It is named for Charles A. Sterling, founder the former Derby-based Sterling Piano Company. Following the closing of the public entertainment portion of the building in 1945 the city continued to use the building as a city hall and police station until 1965.

== History ==
On April 2, 1889, the doors of the Sterling Opera House were opened to the public. It was designed by Italianate Victorian style architect H. Edwards Ficken, who also was co-designer of the famous Carnegie Hall located in Manhattan, New York. It was built to serve both political and entertainment needs. The lower two levels and the basement were the town's City Hall and police station from when it opened up until 1965. The auditorium was used for hundreds of shows and live musical performances in its day. In fact, many world-famous performers such as Harry Houdini and Red Skelton took the stage at Sterling. Shows were held up until 1945 when the curtain closed for the last time. The Sterling Opera House was also later recognized as a historic place with historic value when it became the first building in Connecticut to be added to the National Register of Historic Places on November 8, 1968.

The first showing at the opera house was created by James A. Herne, called "Drifting Apart", and was said that it was "a melodramatic temperance play without the traditional didactic sermons preaching the evils of drink." It also turned out to be a financial failure for James A. Herne. The name of the play was more fitting for the relationship between Derby and Ansonia at the time. Ansonia saw no point in having another opera house be built when they already had a perfectly good one in their town. Brought on by the play, there became drama outside of the building which had a hand in helping the two cities separate.

The last showing at the Sterling Opera House was "Ye Olde Time Minstrel." It was presented by the Lafayette Men's and Women's Club in honor of the returning soldiers of WWII. It showed on November 30-December 1, 1945. After, it had no regularly scheduled program for ten years, though there were special performances before it closed in 1965.

== Interior layout ==
The Sterling Opera house was built with a combination of architectural styles in accordance with a conception of composer Richard Wagner. The seating was arranged so that all viewers in the opera house had an un-obstructed view of the stage. One of the architects to work on the Sterling Opera House designed the lower levels and exterior, while Ficken mostly worked on the roof top, doorways and interior walls. Another notable feature are the piano boxes, that were located on either side of the stage to fit two of the opera house's namesake Sterling Pianos.

== Paranormal activity/claims ==
Sterling, in fact, was the setting of an investigation in a 2011 episode of Ghost Hunters. Many people claim to have seen un-explainable things such shadow figures, orbs of light and objects moving on their own. Even though there are no tragic stories of deaths that occurred there, it is believed that the spirit of Charles Sterling, the man who the structure was named after, may be lurking the building in the afterlife. Some experiences of paranormal activity in the opera house have been people seeing and hearing a little boy playing with a soccer ball up in the balcony seats. This spirit apparently likes to be called Andy. There are in fact soccer balls and other toys scattered across the building and they have been said to move from place to place and disappear. What was once a place of entertainment and joy is now one of the "spookiest" buildings in Connecticut.

== Notable performers ==
There were many famous people who performed at the opera house including Harry Houdini, Amelia Earhart, Lionel Barrymore, as well as John L. Sullivan who was Simon Legree in a showing of Uncle Tom's Cabin. The filmmaker D.W. Griffith showed his movie The Birth of a Nation at the venue. Amelia Earhart was brought to the opera house by the Women's Club on March 16, 1936, and told of her amazing flying adventures./>

== Plans for the future ==
The Sterling Opera House has been abandoned for almost 50 years, and is in need of restoration. Peeling paint, broken windows and rusted metal are merely a few of the problems that have worsened over the years and will need to be fixed. The town of Derby wants to see that this happens as soon as possible. In September 2011, a plan revealed by the town government showed what the plans would be to fix up the old Sterling Opera House. This plan is very costly however, and is estimated to be between $3–4 million. U.S. Representative Rosa DeLauro received a grant for $150,000 to go towards cleaning up the interior. Future plans include tours to showcase the building, and to also make it the town's city hall once again.

== See also ==
- National Register of Historic Places listings in New Haven County, Connecticut
