= Derby High School (Connecticut) =

US high school

Location
- 75 Chatfield Street; Derby, Connecticut 06418; United States
- 41°20′02″N 73°05′53″W

Information
- Type: Public, Secondary School
- Established: 1909 (117 years ago)
- School district: Derby Public School District
- NCES District ID: 0901110
- Superintendent: Matthew Conway
- CEEB code: 070155
- Principal: Jen Olsen
- Teaching staff: 36.00 (FTE)
- Grades: 9-12
- Enrollment: 370 (2023–2024)
- Student to teacher ratio: 10.28
- Colors: Red and white
- Mascot: Red Raiders
- Yearbook: The Lookout
- Budget: $3,658,030 (2017-18)
- Website: www.derbypride.org/our-schools/derby-high-school

Derby High School is a public secondary education school for grades 9–12, it is located at 75 Chatfield Street in Derby. It is the only public secondary education school in Derby and is one of five public schools in the city.

The current school building was built in 1967, and up until 2010 housed Derby Middle and High Schools together. In 2010, Derby Middle School was completed across the street from the high school.

== History ==
Greg Gaillard serves as principal until 2014, when he resigned.

== Former buildings ==
Former High Schools, Derby, CT
Derby High School (Unknown Location) circa 1909	Derby High School - 187 Minerva St - 1915
Derby High School Circa 1909	Derby High School, 1915

== Athletics ==
Athletics Teams
Male Teams	Female Teams
Football; Baseball; Cross Country; Basketball; Soccer; Wrestling; Track & Field	Basketball; Soccer; Cross Country; Softball; Volleyball; Track & Field

Wins in CIAC State Championships
Sport	Class	Year(s)
Baseball	S	1977, 1992, 1996
Basketball (boys)	M	1951
Cheer	S	2000, 2015
Cross country (girls)	S	2016, 2018
Football	S	1990
Football	S-II	1985
Softball	S	1985
Track and field (indoor, boys)	S	2018
Track and field (outdoor, boys)	S	1974, 1976, 2017, 2018, 2021
Wrestling	S	1984, 2000, 2001, 2002
