= Griffin Hospital =

Coordinates: 41.335889°N 73.089189°W

- Griffin Health

Geography
- Location: 130 Division Street, Derby, Connecticut, USA

Organisation
- Type: Community Hospital
- Affiliated university: New York Institute of Technology College of Osteopathic Medicine Yale School of Medicine Quinnipiac University School of Medicine

Services
- Emergency department: Acute Care
- Beds: 160

Helipads
- Helipad: No

History
- Founded: 1909; 117 years ago

Links
- Website: http://www.griffinhealth.org/
- Lists: Hospitals in the United States

Griffin Hospital is a 160-bed community hospital founded in 1909 and located in Derby, Connecticut. The hospital serves more than 130,000 residents in the Lower Naugatuck Valley. Griffin Hospital is Derby's top employer and one of New Haven County's largest employers. Griffin Hospital serves as a flagship hospital for Planetree, an international healthcare organization that centers on patient care. It is a clinical campus of the New York Institute of Technology College of Osteopathic Medicine and provides clinical clerkship education for the medical school's osteopathic medical students.

== National Recognition ==
On February 9, 2009, Griffin Hospital was selected for the tenth year as one of Fortune's 100 Best Companies to Work For, making it the only hospital in the nation to make the list for ten consecutive years.

== The Center for Cancer Care ==
The Center for Cancer Care is affiliated with the Yale-New Haven Health System. It is located at 350 Seymour Avenue in Derby.
