= Charles F. Brooker =

American politician and businessman (1847–1926)

- Brooker in 1912

Member of the Connecticut Senate
- In office 1893–1894

Member of the Connecticut House of Representatives
- In office 1875–1876

Personal details
- Born: Charles Frederick Brooker; March 4, 1847 Litchfield, Connecticut, U.S.
- Died: December 20, 1926 (aged 79) Daytona Beach, Florida, U.S.
- Resting place: Torrington, Connecticut, U.S.
- Party: Republican
- Spouse: Julia E. Clarke Farrel (m. 1894; died 1917)
- Occupation: Politician; business executive

Charles Frederick Brooker (March 4, 1847 – December 20, 1926) was an American politician and copper magnate from Connecticut. He served in the Connecticut House of Representatives from 1875 to 1876 and in the Connecticut Senate from 1893 to 1894. He was president of the American Brass Company from its formation in 1900 to 1920.

== Early life ==
Charles Frederick Brooker was born on March 4, 1847, in Litchfield, Connecticut. He attended school in Litchfield and Torrington.

== Career ==
=== Business career ===
At the age of 17, Brooker began working for the Coe Brass Company of Torrington as a bookkeeper. He then became secretary of the company in 1870. In 1893, when his uncle Lyman W. Coe died, Brooker succeeded him as president of Coe Brass Company.

In 1900, Brooker consolidated the Waterbury Brass Company of Waterbury, Benedict and Burnham and Holmes of Waterbury, Booth and Hyden of Waterbury, the Ansonia Brass and Copper Company of Ansonia, and the Coe Brass Company of both Ansonia and Torrington into the American Brass Company of Waterbury. He then acquired the Chicago Brass Company of Kenosha, Wisconsin. He served as president of the American Brass Company for 20 years until 1920 when he became chairman of the board. He maintained his role as president after American Brass was purchased by Anaconda Copper Company.

Brooker was director of Chile Copper Company, Anaconda Copper Mining Company, Chile Exploration Company, the U.S. Smelting and Refining Company, and the New Haven Railroad. He also had interests in Farrel Foundry and Machine Company of Ansonia. He was also director of manufacturing companies, banks, and water companies in the Naugatuck Valley.

=== Political career ===
Brooker represented Connecticut in the Republican National Committee from 1900 to 1916 and served as a member of its executive committee. He was a member of the Republican State Central Committee and was a delegate to the state conventions. He maintained a close relationship with Charles Hopkins Clark, editor of the Hartford Courant.

Brooker served in the Connecticut House of Representatives in 1875 and in the Connecticut Senate in 1893.

== Personal life ==
Brooker married Julia E. Clarke Farrel, widow of Alton Farrel, of Ansonia on October 30, 1894. His wife died in 1917. He had no children. His stepson was Alton Farrel Jr. He lived in Ansonia.

Brooker was a member of the Union League Club, the Engineers' Club, the Lawyers' Club, the Transportation Club of New York, the New York Chamber of Commerce, and the New York Yacht Club. He was a governor of the New England Society of Colonial Wars of Connecticut. He was an Episcopalian and a vestryman of Christ Church in Ansonia. He was friends with Chauncey Depew.

Brooker was a donor to the New Haven Anti-Tuberculosis Society (or Gaylord Farm Sanatorium) of Wallingford. Upon his death, his estate donated to Yale University, Dartmouth College, Leland Stanford Junior University, the Maria Seymour Brooker Memorial Inc., the New Haven County Anti-Tuberculosis Association, and the Kenosha Hospital in Kenosha, Wisconsin.

Brooker had a stroke in the spring of 1926 in the West Indies. He went to Daytona Beach, Florida, in November 1926 to recover his health. He had a stroke about a week after his arrival. He subsequently died on December 20, 1926, at a hotel in Daytona Beach. He was buried in Torrington.

== Awards ==
Brooker received an honorary degree in Master of Arts from Yale University for his work in the metal industry.
