= Magnan v. Anaconda Industries, Inc. =

Magnan v. Anaconda Industries, Inc
- Court: Supreme Court of Connecticut
- Citation: 193 Conn. 558, 479 A.2d 781 (1984)

Keywords
- Good faith

Magnan v. Anaconda Industries, Inc 193 Conn. 558, 479 A.2d 781 (1984) is a US labor law case, concerning the doctrine of employment at will.

== Facts ==
George Magnan was employee of Anaconda Industries' brass factory in Ansonia, Connecticut. He was discharged for allegedly for breaching his duty of loyalty in preventing theft of company property. He argued that the employer was in breach of contract, through breach of the duty of good faith. This, he argued, entailed the principle that no employee would be sacked without good cause.

The employer argued that good faith was an "amorphorous" concept, that would only lead juries to usurp managerial decisions, "guided by vague concepts of public morality rather than principles of law."

== Judgment ==
The Court held that the obligation of good faith and fair dealing is a rule of construction, designed to fulfill the reasonable expectations of the contracting parties, and that, unless the terms of the contract are contrary to public policy, the good faith principle cannot be applied to achieve a result contrary to the clearly expressed terms of the contract.

Although employment contracts were not exempt from the implied term of good faith, that term did not require good cause for dismissal.

== See also ==
- US labor law
- Statute of Laborers 1562, required "some reasonable and sufficient cause or matter" to justify firing an employee. Originally English courts treated an employment to last for one year, where the contract was silent.
