= Valley Independent Sentinel =

- Type: Daily newspaper
- Format: Broadsheet
- Owner(s): Valley Community Foundation and the Online Journalism Project
- Founder: Knight Foundation
- Editor: Eugene Driscoll
- Founded: 2009
- Language: English
- Headquarters: 158 Main Street Suite 305, Ansonia, Connecticut 06401; United States
- Website: valley.newhavenindependent.org

The Valley Independent Sentinel is an online-only, non-profit news site covering the lower Naugatuck Valley of Connecticut, United States.

== About ==
The site launched on June 22, 2009. It covers the cities of Ansonia, Derby and Shelton, along with the towns of Oxford and Seymour.

The site is named in honor of The Evening Sentinel, a daily newspaper that was shut down in 1994.

It covers community news and events, with an emphasis on breaking news.

The Valley Independent Sentinel has a full-time staff of three professional journalists, who worked previously at The Hartford Courant, The Connecticut Post, The News-Times of Danbury and The Republican-American of Waterbury. The site has an office on Main Street in Ansonia.

== Funding ==
The Valley Independent Sentinel was created through a partnership between the Online Journalism Project, the Community Foundation for Greater New Haven, and the Valley Community Foundation.

Its first two years were funded through a $500,000 grant from the Knight Foundation. Subsequent years have been funded through money raised by the Online Journalism Project.

The Online Journalism Project also publishes The New Haven Independent.

== Awards ==
During its first six months in operation, the Valley Independent Sentinel won five awards for its reporting from the Connecticut Society of Professional Journalists.
