= William J. Cousins =

American sociologist

William J. Cousins (January 25, 1924 – July 31, 2013) was an American sociologist who led international urban community development, taught sociology and race relations at several colleges, and wrote a number of books and articles on international community development. Although he was raised in the Baptist Church, he began his affiliation with the Quakers during his university years and became a lifelong pacifist.

Cousins was the first Black faculty member at Wellesley College, and among the first African Americans to teach at a top liberal arts college.

Yale University Library records Cousins as a sociologist whose focused on race relation and interracial interactions. At Yale, he focused his graduate research on race relations and completed a dissertation titled A Role Analysis of Negro-White Relations that examined interracial relations through the lens of role theory. Shortly after completing his Ph.D. at Yale University, Cousins went to India with the American Friends Service Committee and began a career in international community development. He led several projects over the years in which reliance on local leaders and community members, rather than outside aid, led to important improvement in slum living conditions.

Notable among these was Cousins' work in the 1970s through UNICEF on the successful model project in Hyderabad, India's fifth largest city. There, Cousins and his team concentrated on creating a community spirit before attempting to improve homes and other community facilities.

== Early life ==
Cousins was raised in Ansonia, Connecticut. He was struck with polio when he was eight years old, and was initially unable to walk. With extensive physical therapy performed by his parents, he began to regain mobility. He attended Newington ("Newington Home for Crippled Children."), a rehabilitation school, for several years and by the time he entered Yale University, he was able to walk with just a cane. Cousins was awarded both his undergraduate and doctoral degrees in sociology from Yale University. Cousins' dissertation, titled A Role Analysis of Negro-White Relations, focused on role theory and the link to interracial relations. His research heavily reflected insight into the dynamics of minority groups.

== Career ==
Most of his career was in community development at the international level. He began with the international Cooperation Administration (predecessor of AID) as a rural Community development Advisor in India and Iran. In 1964, he was appointed by Then he became the first Peace Corps representative in Iran. This was followed by volunteering as one of the three founders of a pilot project in Urban Community Development in Baroda, India, sponsored by the American Friends Service Committee.

He has taught at four distinctly different Colleges; Knoxville College, an historically black institutes; Wellesley College, a New England women's College; Earlham College, a Quaker institution in Indiana and Federal City College in Washington DC. There he served as Professor, Chair of the Social Science Division and Interim Provost.

Cousins then returned to the academic world for nine years before accepting a job with UNICEF as an Urban Advisor in New Delhi. He retired from UNICEF in 1987 as Senior Urban Advisor in their New York headquarters. He has also been a consultant to UNICEF, CARE, the World Bank, John Snow INC, Food Aid Management, Sister Cities and the government of India. This has taken him to Bangladesh, India, the Philippines, Egypt and Namibia.

He has served on the board of Overseers of CARE and the boards of World Neighbors and the American Friends Service Committee; as well as the board of Trustees of the Friends Meeting of Washington.

He also served as a alderman in the 1960s and later made a move by ruling the death penalty unconstitutional in Illinois before the state officially got rid of it.

== Publications ==
- Cousins, William J., A Role Analysis of Negro-White Relations, Yale University, 1953. 231 pages
- Cousins, William J., Urban Basic Services in Unicef, UNICEF History Monograph Series XIV, copyright. United Nations Children's Fund 1992
- Cousins, William J. and Catherine Goyder, Changing Slum Communities
- Fry, Sarah, Bill Cousins, Ken Olivola, Health of Children Living in Urban Slums in Asia and the Near East: Review of Existing Literature and Data, 2002, USAID.
