= Richard Mansfield House =

Historic house in Connecticut, United States

- U.S. National Register of Historic Places
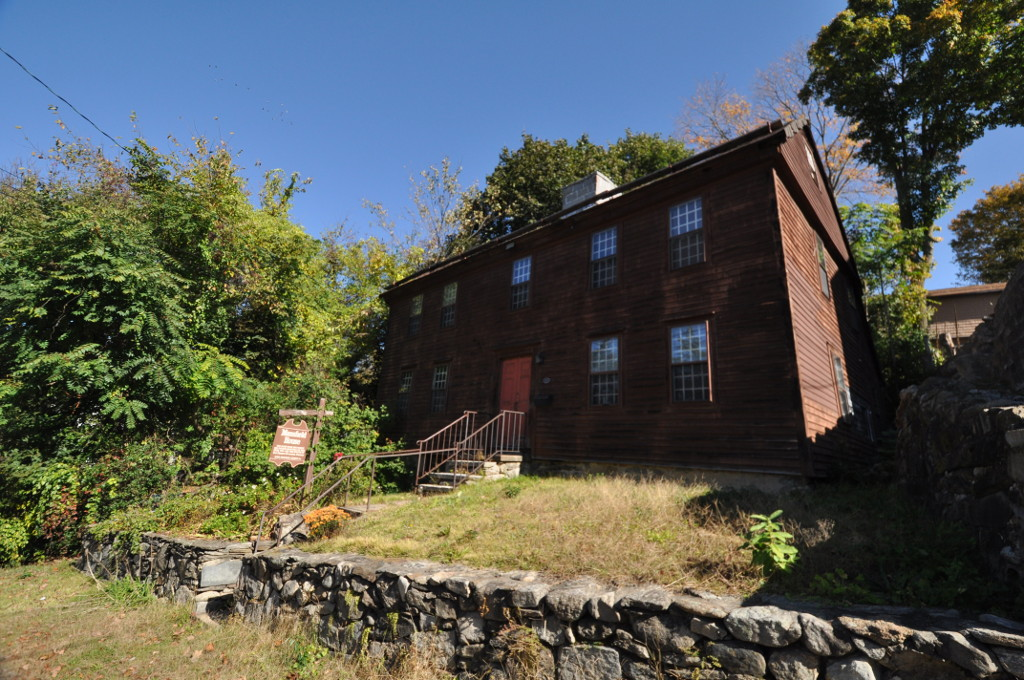

- Location within Connecticut Location within the United States
- Location: 35 Jewett Street, Ansonia, Connecticut
- Coordinates: 41°20′23″N 73°04′14″W
- Area: 1 acre (0.40 ha)
- Built: 1748
- NRHP reference No.: 71000906
- Added to NRHP: March 11, 1971

The Richard Mansfield House is a historic house at 35 Jewett Street in Ansonia, Connecticut owned by the Derby Historical Society. Built at the turn of the 17th-century, it is one of the community's oldest surviving buildings, and is noted for its association with a prominent early Episcopal minister. It was listed on the National Register of Historic Places in 1971.

== Description and history ==
The Richard Mansfield House is located in a residential area east of downtown Ansonia, on the east side of Jewett Street just south of its junction with Root Avenue. It is set close to the street, with a low fieldstone retaining wall. It is a 2 1/2-story wood-frame structure, with a gabled roof, stone chimney, and clapboarded exterior. The rear roof face extends to the first floor, giving the house a classic New England saltbox profile. The front facade is five bays wide, with sash windows arranged symmetrically around the center entrance. The gable ends at the sides project slightly beyond the faces of the lower wall sections. The interior retains a number of original features, include a fireplace surround.

The house has a build date of at least 1700 and was purchased for Reverend Richard Mansfield, a native of New Haven in 1748. Mansfield had been raised a Congregationalist, but converted to the Church of England, and established a mission in Derby (which Ansonia was then still part of). Mansfield had to flee during the American Revolutionary War due to his Loyalist leanings, but returned and continued to serve in the local Episcopal church until his death in 1820. The house was moved across the street from its original location in 1926, to make way for the church now standing there.

== See also ==
- National Register of Historic Places listings in New Haven County, Connecticut
- https://www.derbyhistorical.org/mansfield-house/
