= United States Post Office–Ansonia Main =

- US Post Office-Ansonia Main
- U.S. National Register of Historic Places
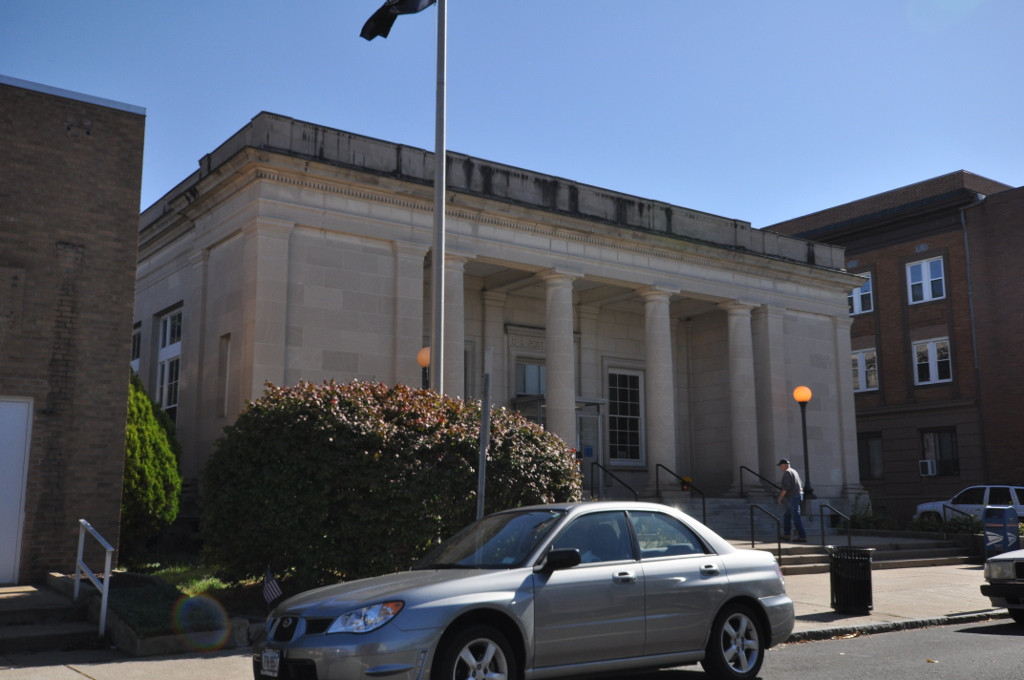

- Location within Connecticut Location within the United States
- Location: 237 Main Street, Ansonia, Connecticut
- Coordinates: 41°20′35″N 73°4′43″W
- Area: 0.8 acres (0.32 ha)
- Built: 1913
- Architect: Wenderoth, Oscar
- Architectural style: Classical Revival
- NRHP reference No.: 85003327
- Added to NRHP: December 12, 1985

The U.S. Post Office-Ansonia Main, also known as the Ansonia Main Post Office, is located at 237 Main Street in Ansonia, Connecticut. Designed by Oscar Wenderoth and completed in 1914, it is one of the more architecturally sophisticated buildings in Ansonia's central business district. The building was listed on the National Register of Historic Places in 1985.

== Description and history ==
The Ansonia Main Post Office is located on the east side of Main Street in downtown Ansonia, between Bridge Street and Kingston Drive. It is a single story steel and masonry structure, finished in limestone. Its front facade is smooth limestone with a recessed center entrance area supported by four Ionic columns set in antes. It is covered by a low hip roof, which is obscured by a balustrade set above a dentillated cornice. The interior lobby space is finished in white terrazzo marble and plaster, with original wooden trim. A buff brick addition extends to the rear, providing modern amenities including a loading dock.

The building was completed in 1914 to a design by Oscar Wenderoth, then the Office of the Supervising Architect for the U.S. Treasury. He designed it in 1913, a year in which his office produced 40 designs. It is a good example of restrained Classical Revival architecture, and one of the city's architecturally finer buildings.

== See also ==
- National Register of Historic Places listings in New Haven County, Connecticut
- List of United States post offices
