= Ansonia Library =

- U.S. National Register of Historic Places
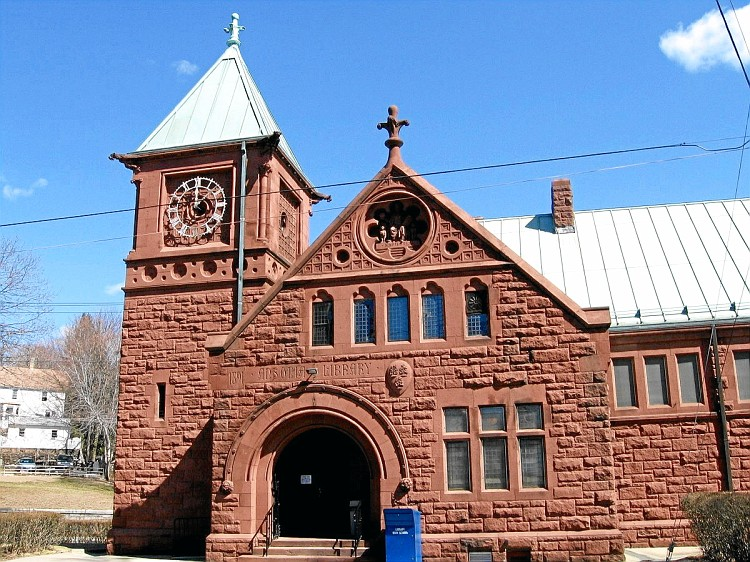

- Location within Connecticut Location within the United States
- Location: 53 South Cliff Street, Ansonia, Connecticut
- Coordinates: 41°20′43″N 73°4′37″W
- Area: 0.5 acres (0.20 ha)
- Built: 1892
- Built by: August Budde & W. George Calder
- Architect: George Keller
- Architectural style: Richardsonian Romanesque
- NRHP reference No.: 85001828
- Added to NRHP: August 23, 1985

The Ansonia Library is the public library serving Ansonia, Connecticut. It is located at 53 South Cliff, in an architecturally distinguished Richardsonian Romanesque building designed by Connecticut architect George Keller and completed in 1892 as a gift from Caroline Phelps Stokes. It was listed on the National Register of Historic Places on August 23, 1985.

== Architecture and building history ==
The Ansonia Library stands in a mainly residential area a short way east of downtown Ansonia, on a triangular parcel at the junction of South Cliff Street and Cottage Avenue. It is a two-and-a-half-story building with load-bearing brownstone walls, 82 by 70 feet (25 m × 21 m) in plan. Its walls are 2 feet (0.61 m) and thicker. Its asymmetrical plan is visually dominated by a square tower on the left side, with a clock in its upper stage and a pyramidal copper roof. The main entrance is set near the center of the South Cliff facade, recessed under a large round arch. The gable above the entrance has a rose window near its peak.

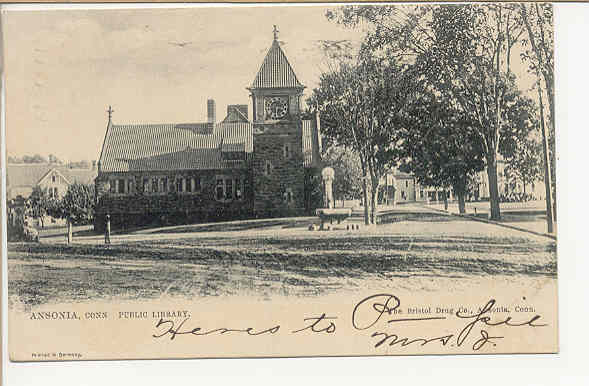
Ansonia Library (1892), George Keller, architect.

The building was donated by Caroline Phelps Stokes as a memorial to her parents and to her maternal grandfather Anson Greene Phelps, a locally prominent industrialist who founded the Ansonia Brass Works, and for whom the city is named. The building was built on land purchased by Stokes, and was completed in 1892. It was not formally turned over to the city for four years, over disagreements between the family and the city over control of the library and the need for a maintenance fund. A major addition was made to the building's southern end in 1960, designed by O.C.S. Zircoli of Bridgeport.

== See also ==
- National Register of Historic Places listings in New Haven County, Connecticut
