= Upper Main Street Historic District (Ansonia, Connecticut) =

Historic district in Connecticut, United States

- U.S. National Register of Historic Places
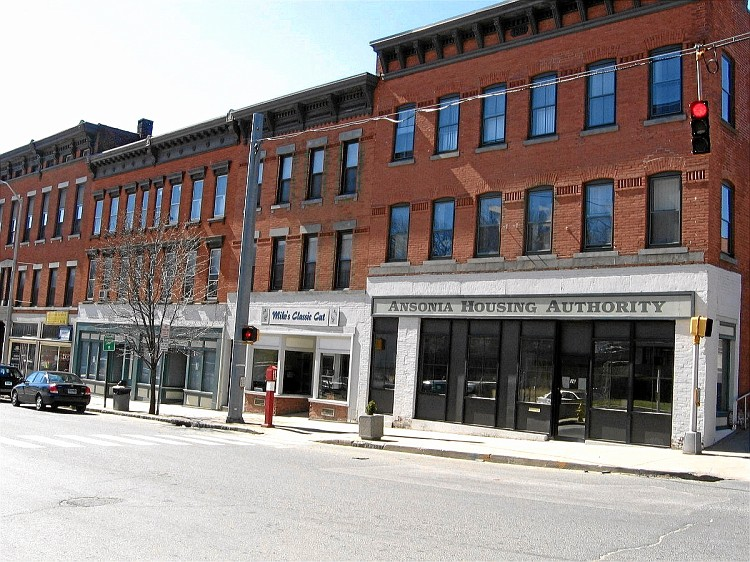

- Location within Connecticut Location within the United States
- Location: 36-100, 85-117 Main Street, Ansonia, Connecticut
- Coordinates: 41°20′41″N 73°4′47″W
- Area: 2 acres (0.81 ha)
- Built: 1870
- Architect: Griggs, W. E.
- Architectural style: Classical Revival, Italianate, 1930s Commercial
- NRHP reference No.: 82001004
- Added to NRHP: December 2, 1982

The Upper Main Street Historic District encompasses a collection of mainly late-19th-century commercial buildings on Main Street in downtown Ansonia, Connecticut. Extending south from Maple Street, the district exemplifies the rapid commercial growth of the city at that time. Its most prominent feature is the Ansonia Opera House, built 1870. The district was listed on the National Register of Historic Places in 1982.

== Description and history ==
Ansonia's historic downtown area is located on a terrace of the steeply pitched hillside on the eastern bank of the Naugatuck River, from which it is separated by railroad tracks and a flood wall. The district is about 2 acres (0.81 ha) in size, with its major feature a row of connected masonry commercial buildings on the west side of Main Street, extending south from Maple Street to the opera house. A smaller array of buildings standing roughly opposite the opera house round out the district. The district is hemmed in by a combination of more recent construction and by some of the factories that caused the city's growth. Most of the buildings were constructed between 1870 and 1900, with most predating Ansonia's separation from Derby in 1889.

The Ansonia Opera House is the largest and most prominent of the district's buildings. It was built about 1870, and is a fine example of Italianate architecture executed in brick and stone. Across the street stands the Savings Bank of Ansonia building, a neo-Classical structure with an elaborate granite facade. Immediately north of the opera house stands a two-story Romanesque building finished in yellow brick. The buildings extending north from it are all brick three-story buildings, whose most architecturally sophisticated elements are their cornices, some of which are elaborately worked.

== See also ==
- National Register of Historic Places listings in New Haven County, Connecticut
