= WADS =

Currently silent
- Ansonia, Connecticut; United States
- Broadcast area: Greater Bridgeport; Greater New Haven
- Frequency: 690 kHz
- Branding: Radio Amor

Programming
- Language: Spanish
- Format: Christian radio

Ownership
- Owner: Radio Amor, Inc.

History
- First air date: 1956

Technical information
- Licensing authority: FCC
- Facility ID: 54481
- Class: D
- Power: 3,200 watts (daytime only)
- Transmitter coordinates: 41°20′46″N 73°6′51″W

Links
- Public license information: Public file; LMS
- Website: amor690.com

WADS (690 AM) is a radio station licensed to serve Ansonia, Connecticut, owned by Radio Amor, Inc. The station covers the Greater Bridgeport and New Haven areas.

By day, WADS is powered with 3,200 watts. It must sign off the air at night to avoid interference to Canadian station CKGM.

WADS went silent on August 12, 2022, due to the loss of its transmitter site. On August 31, 2024, the station resumed operations from a temporary transmitter site in Derby. The station went off the air again on August 27, 2025. It returned to the air from a temporary transmitter site on August 28, 2026, but in November again informed the Federal Communications Commission that it was silent.
