= Ansonia Clock Company =

American clock manufacturer

The Ansonia Clock Company was a clock manufacturing business founded in Ansonia, Connecticut, in 1851 and which moved to Brooklyn, New York, in 1878. The company has produced hundreds of different clock models, including Gingerbread, Porcelain, and Crystal Regulator styles. The business shut down in 2006.

== History ==
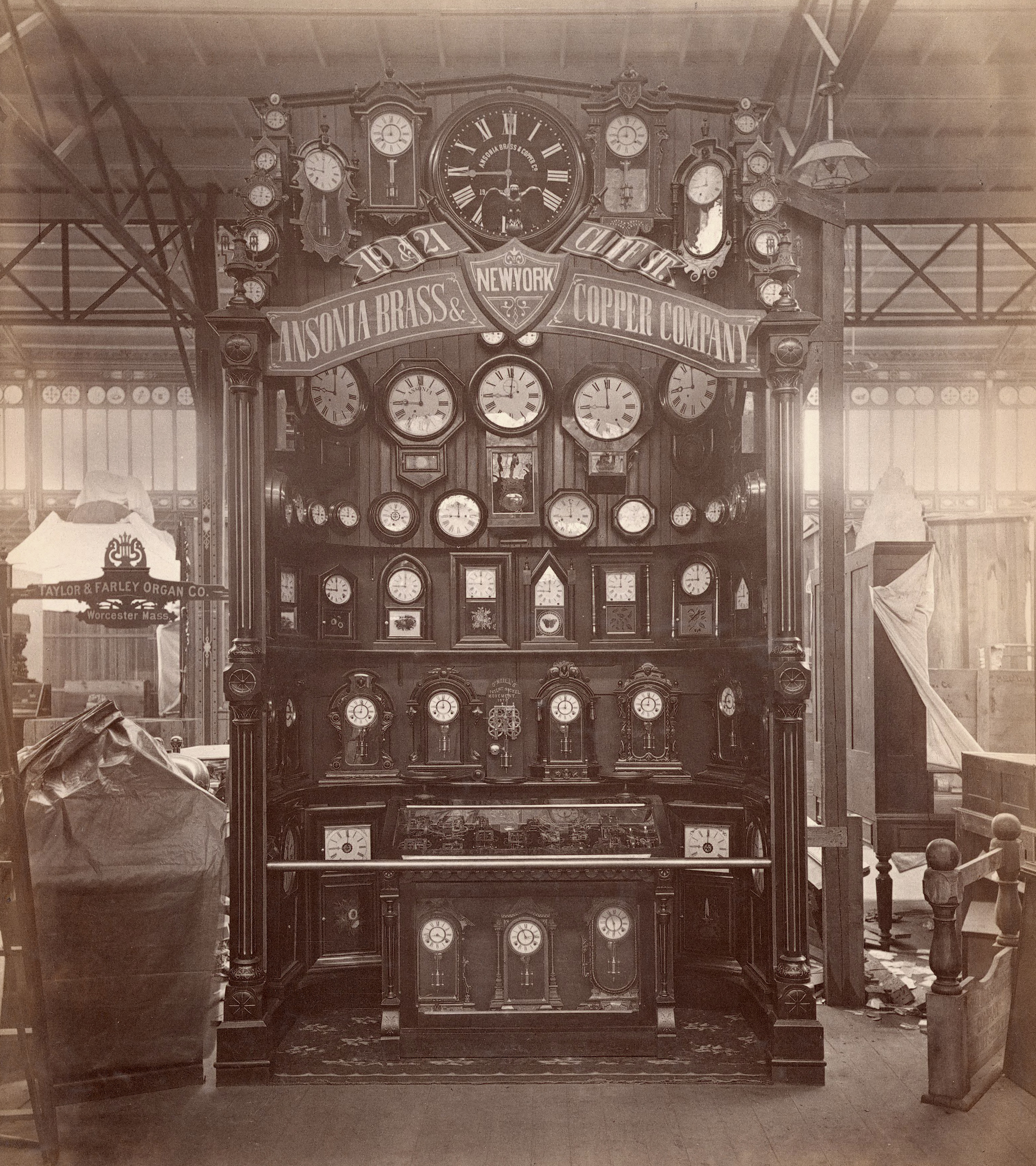
Ansonia clock exhibit at the U.S. Centennial exhibition, Philadelphia, 1876

Very early clocks were made of iron and wood. However, by the sixteenth century brass was being specified for the mechanism. By the mid nineteenth century cheap clocks were being mass-produced using stamped brass. In 1844, metal dealer Anson Greene Phelps formed the Ansonia Brass company in Connecticut, to supply the expanding clock business - nine companies were producing clocks in Connecticut.

In 1851 the Ansonia Clock Company was formed as a subsidiary of the Ansonia Brass Company by Phelps and two Bristol, Connecticut, clockmakers, Theodore Terry and Franklin C. Andrews. Terry & Andrews were the largest clock manufacturers in Bristol, with more than 50 employees using 58 tons of brass in the production of about 25,000 clocks in 1849. Phelps decided to get into the clockmaking business to expand the market for his brass, while Terry and Andrews got access to better quality brass at better prices. They had resultantly sold 50% of their business to Phelps, and moved the business to Ansonia after their Derby, Connecticut factory burned in 1854.

=== Expansion ===
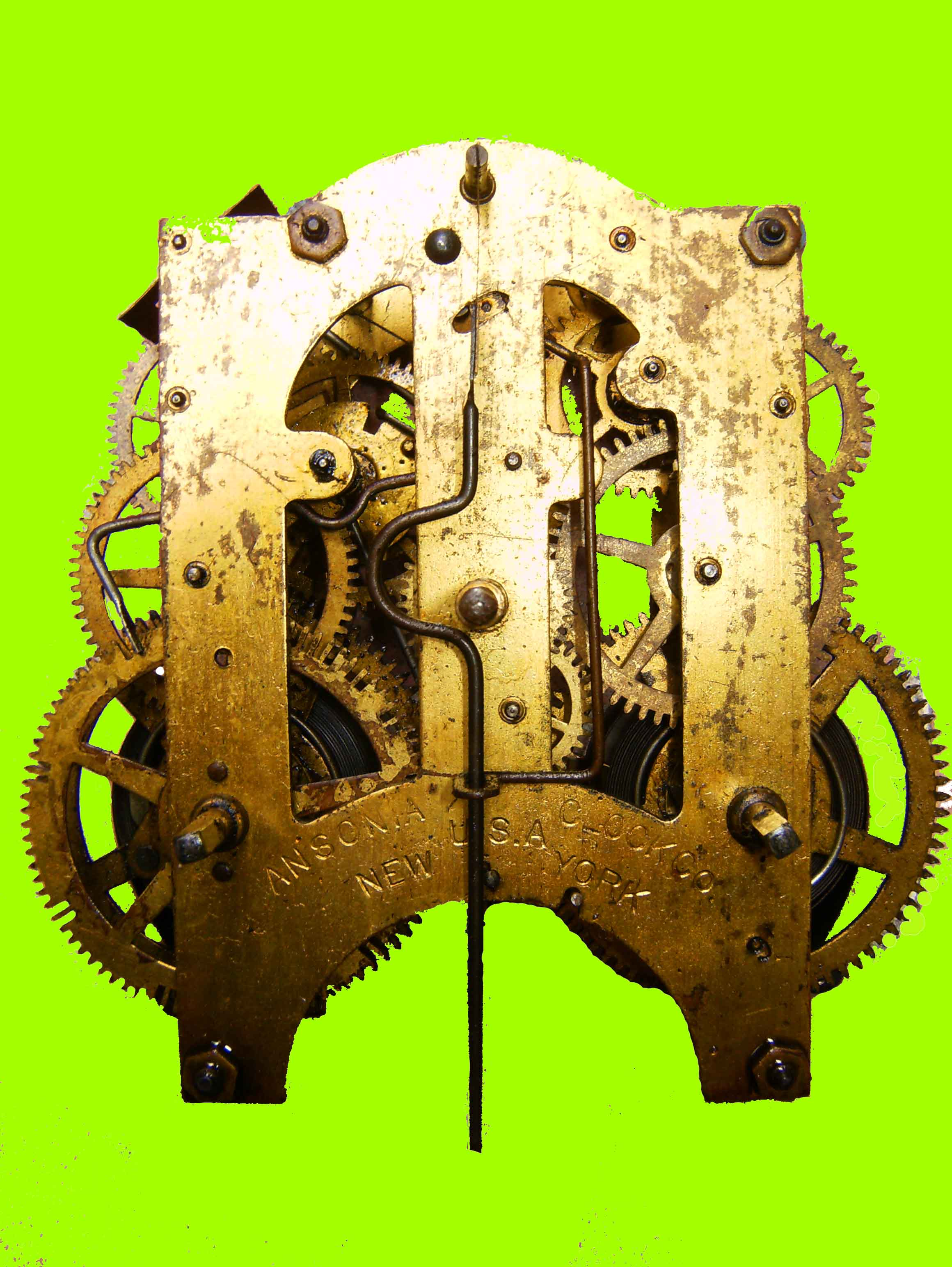
Ansonia clock movement c. 1904

In 1877 the clock company purchased a factory in New York, and moved most of its production there after being spun off from the brass company. Henry J. Davies of Brooklyn, himself a clockmaker, inventor and case designer, joined the newly reconstituted company as one of its founders. As President, he is thought to have been largely responsible for the figurine clocks, swing clocks and other unusual and desirable novelties for which the Ansonia firm became known.

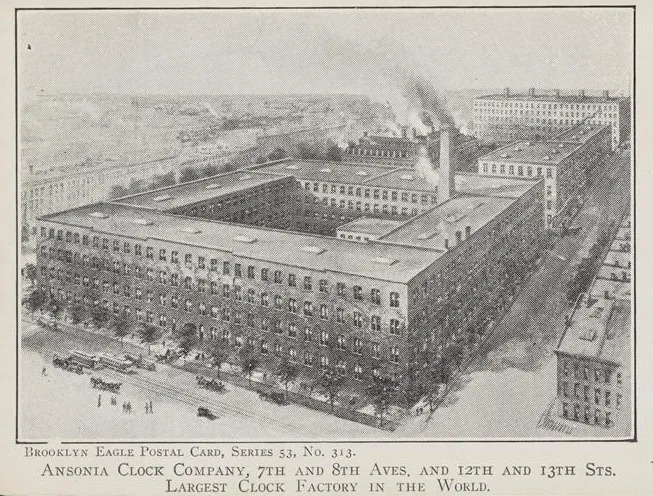
Brooklyn factory featured on a postcard c. 1910

The factory could produce 400 different models of clock cases for 50 different kinds of clock movements. Thomas Edison visited the factory in 1878 to experiment combining clocks with his newly developed phonograph, but the experiments proved unviable.

By 1879, a second factory was opened in Brooklyn, New York and by June 1880 employed 360 workers, while the Connecticut factory continued producing clocks as well with a workforce of 100 men and 25 women. Hence, clocks marked "Connecticut" were generally produced before 1879, while those marked "New York" were all produced after 1880.

=== The peak years ===
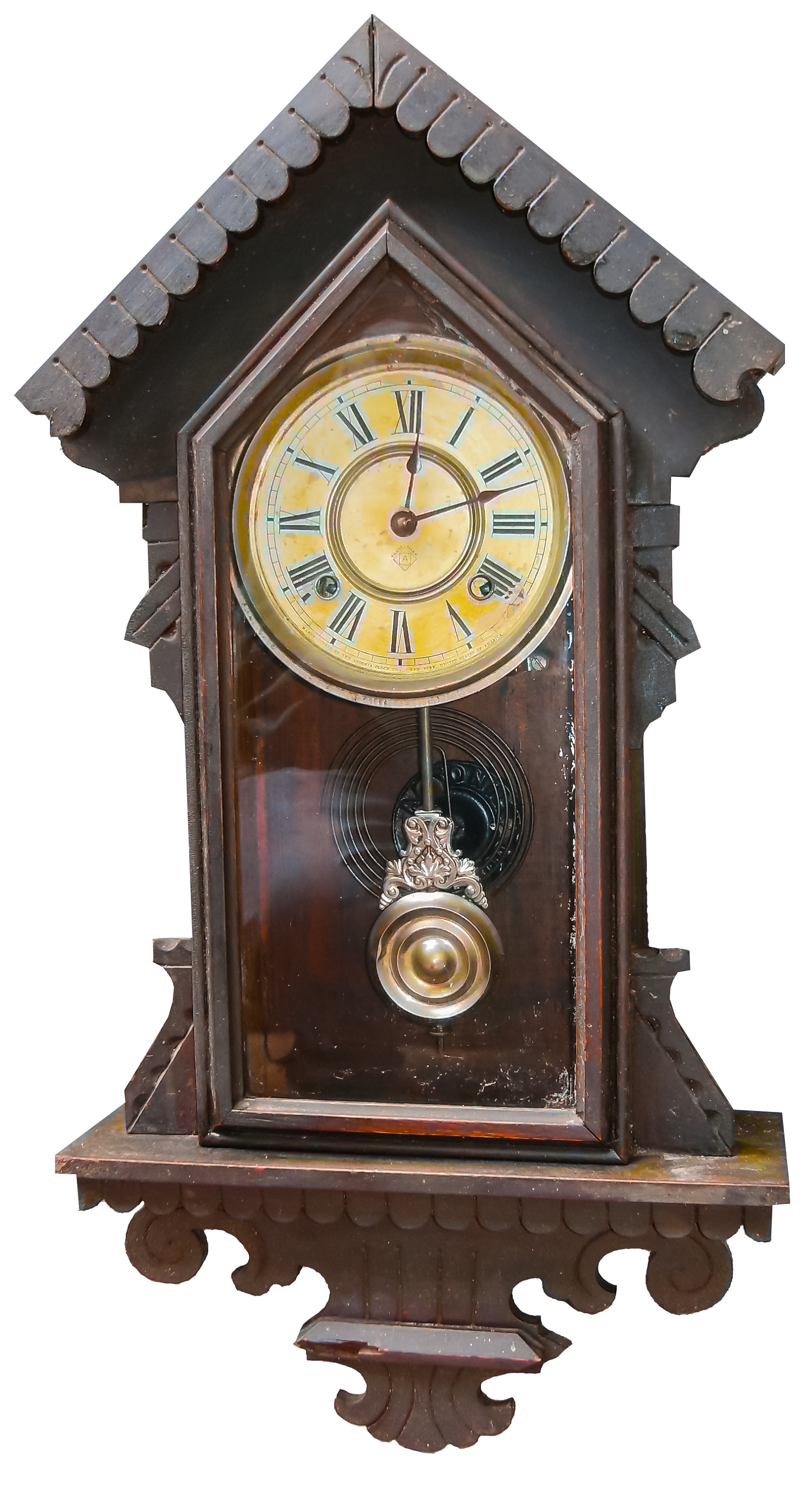
Ansonia model, c. 1904, Santiago, color caoba

The New York factory burnt down in 1880 - the loss was reported to be $750,000 with only $395,000 insured. 1,200 became unemployed.

The company rebuilt the factory on the same site, and reopened the expanded factory in 1881, with capacity to exceed that of the Connecticut factory - which closed completely in 1883. By 1886, the company had sales offices in New York, Chicago and London, and more than 225 different clock models were being manufactured. The prosperous and debt-free Ansonia Clock Company reported having an inventory worth $600,000 and receivables valued at $250,000. In 1904, Ansonia added non-jeweled watches to their line, and produced an estimated ten million of these by 1929.

In 1899, Phelps's grandson William Earle Dodge Stokes commissioned architect Paul E. Duboy to build the "greatest and grandest hotel in Manhattan, New York." New York's first air conditioned building, the Ansonia Hotel still stands at 2107 Broadway, albeit as a condominium apartment block.

=== Decline ===
In early 1914, just before World War I, Ansonia was producing 440 different models. However, the novelty clock became subject to fierce competition. As Ansonia's strongest selling line, rather than maintain profit, Ansonia attempted to gain volume by offering clocks at "old pricing".

This tactic racked up huge debts, and by 1920 the number of models was down to 136 models, and 47 by 1927. In 1926, the company sold its Brooklyn warehouse, but this could not stem the inevitable. In 1929, the majority of the timekeeping machinery and tooling was sold to the Soviet government's US trading company Amtorg, just before the stock market crash. The parts, machinery and key skilled workers were shipped out of the USA to form the basis, along with the remains of a watch company purchased a year later, of the clock and watch industry in Moscow such as Poljot and Sekonda.

In 1969, the rights to the name, trademarks, and goodwill were transferred to Ansonia Clock Co., Inc., Lynnwood, Washington.

Ansonia closed in 2006, after 155 years of operation.
