= Ansonia, Connecticut =

City in Connecticut, United States

- City
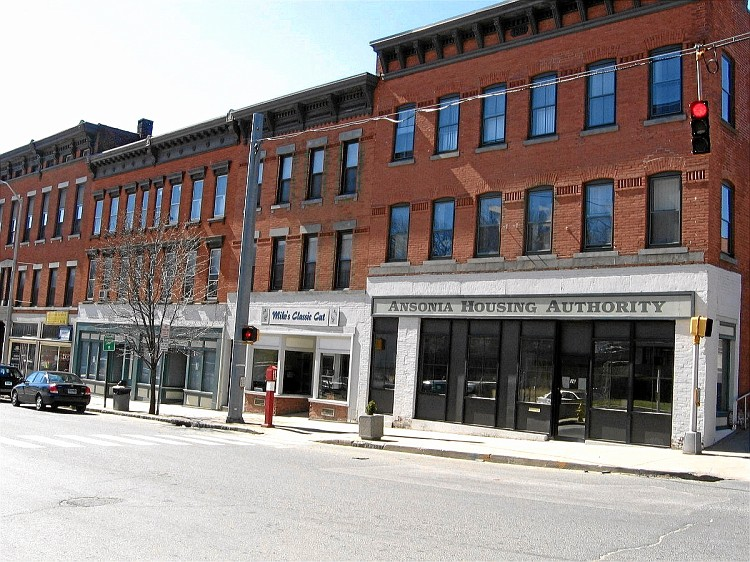
- Upper Main Street Historic District

- Flag Seal
- Nickname: Copper City
- Interactive map of Ansonia, Connecticut
- Coordinates: 41°20′36″N 73°04′07″W
- Country: United States
- U.S. state: Connecticut
- County: New Haven
- Region: Naugatuck Valley
- Incorporated (town): 1889
- Incorporated (city): 1893

Government
  - Type: Mayor-Board of Aldermen
  - Mayor: Frank Tyszka (D)

Area
  - Total: 6.19 sq mi (16.02 km^{2})
  - Land: 6.02 sq mi (15.59 km^{2})
  - Water: 0.17 sq mi (0.44 km^{2})
- Elevation: 82 ft (25 m)

Population (2020)
  - Total: 18,918
  - Density: 3,143/sq mi (1,213.5/km^{2})
- Time zone: UTC−5 (Eastern)
  - Summer (DST): UTC−4 (Eastern)
- ZIP Code: 06401
- Area codes: 203/475
- FIPS code: 09-01150
- GNIS ID: 205107
- Website: cityofansonia.com

Ansonia is a city in New Haven County, Connecticut, United States. Located on the Naugatuck River, it is immediately north of Derby, and about 12 miles (19 km) northwest of New Haven. The city is part of the Naugatuck Valley Planning Region. The population was 18,918 at the time of the 2020 census. The ZIP code for Ansonia is 06401. The city is served by the Metro-North Railroad. Ansonia Station is a stop on the railroad passenger commuter service's Waterbury Branch connecting to New York's Grand Central Terminal. Ansonia also is served by the Connecticut Transit bus carrier. Connecticut Route 8 serves Ansonia (Northbound, Exit 18; Southbound, Exit 19).

Ansonia was founded in 1844 by merchant and philanthropist Anson Green Phelps. Also referred to as "The Copper City", is recognized for its history of heavy machine manufacturing industry in the lower Naugatuck Valley. Production included copper, brass, rubber and plastics processing, molding and tubing, iron castings, sheet metal, electric, automatic screw machine, textiles, and foundry products. The well-known Ansonia Clock Company was founded here in 1851.

Ansonia is the birthplace of David Humphreys, a diplomat and colonel in the American Revolutionary War.

== History ==
The area along the Naugatuck River, comprising the present Elm Street section of Ansonia and Derby Avenue section of Derby, was first settled by English colonists in 1652; it was originally a part of the township of Derby. Early settlers developed subsistence farming, and used the river for sawmills and gristmills.

In 1844, Anson Green Phelps (1781–1853), a merchant and philanthropist, wanted to expand the old borough of Birmingham (the present downtown of the city of Derby) to the north along the west side of the Naugatuck River to enable industrial development. Unable to purchase the land from its owner, in 1844 Phelps acquired land along the east side of the river; today this is Ansonia's downtown section. A canal was dug for river power to drive the factories and businesses in the new industrial village, which Phelps named "Ansonia". He wanted to name the industrial village as "Phelpsville", but learned there was another village in the region by that name. As suggested by a friend, Phelps used his first name as a root instead, resulting in "Ansonia".

As industry developed, soon Ansonia became the most populous area of Derby, boasting many factories. The state chartered Ansonia as a borough of Derby in 1864 and amended it in 1871, granting full municipal privileges. In 1888, a petition was circulated in the borough of Ansonia for the purpose of becoming a separate township from Derby. In 1889 the State General Assembly granted the separation, constituting the Borough, Hilltop, West Ansonia, and Elm Street areas as a separate town known as Ansonia. This was the 168th township in the state of Connecticut. In 1893, Ansonia was incorporated as a city, consolidating with the coterminous Town and the old borough.

By the end of the 19th century, the city had manufacturers of heavy machinery, electric supplies, brass and copper products, and silk goods. Ansonia, Derby, Shelton, Seymour, and Beacon Falls formed one of the most important industrial communities in the state.

=== Invention of America's first bicycle ===
In 1866, while residing in Ansonia, inventor Pierre Lallement, a native of Pont-a-Mousson, France, submitted a patent application for the first pedaled (rotary crank mechanism) bicycle.

=== 20th century to present ===
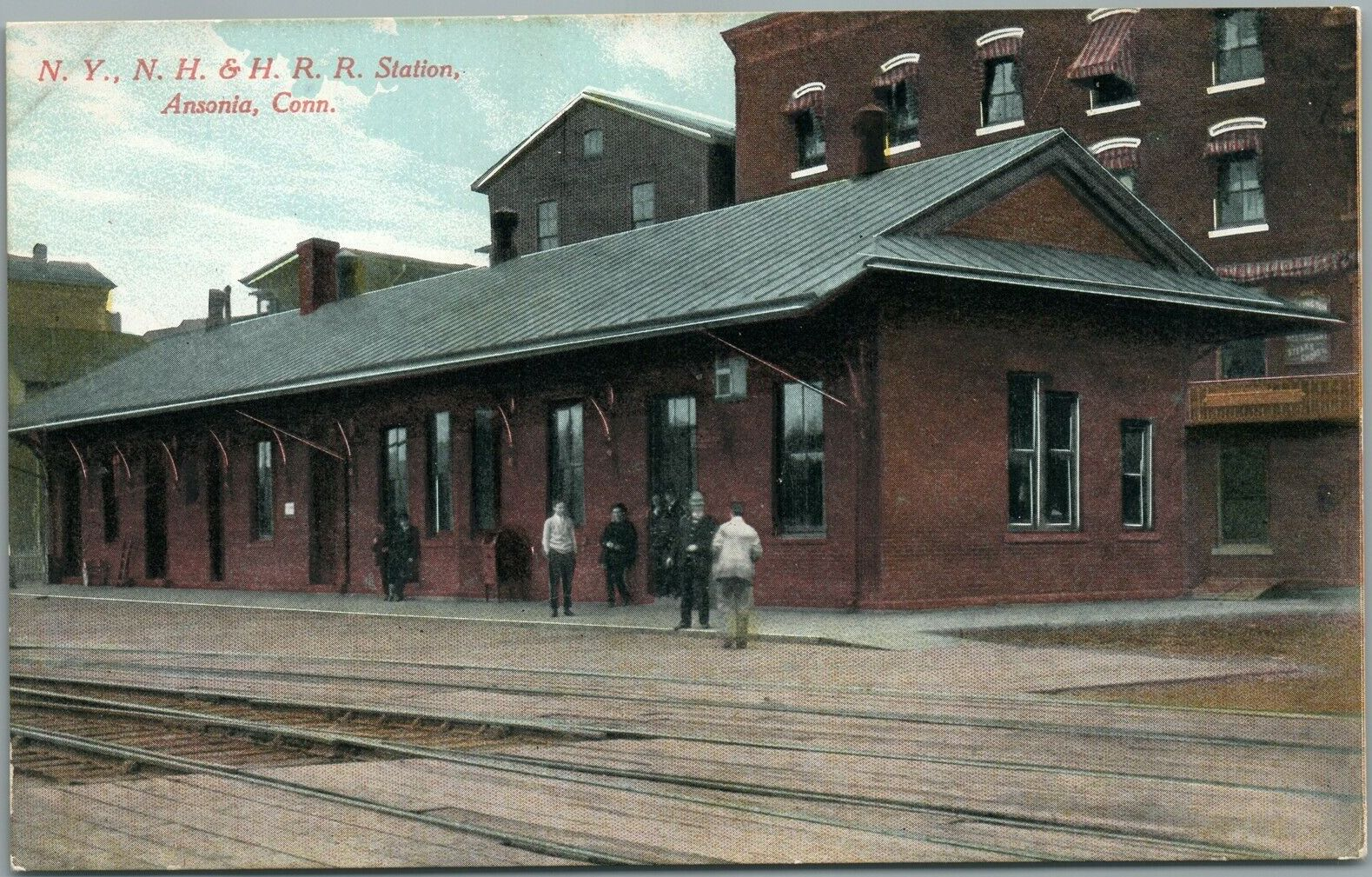
Ansonia station, c. 1910

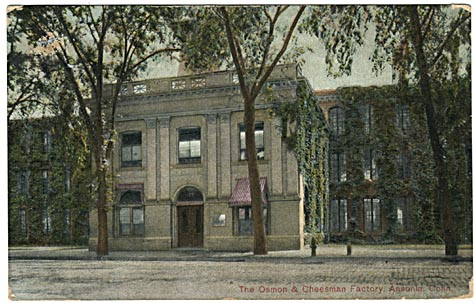
Osman & Cheesman Factory (1907 postcard)

Ansonia suffered grievous damage in the Flood of 1955 on August 19, when the Naugatuck River flooded due to heavy rain from Hurricane Diane. Submerging the land along the river, the flood destroyed many houses and businesses. The high river waters swept away Maple Street Bridge, one of two bridges linking the east and west sides of Ansonia. After the inundation, the authorities erected a flood wall along the east bank of the river to protect the city's factories and Main Street. On the west bank, federal public housing was built to replace blocks of destroyed homes and businesses on Broad Street, now known as Olson Drive.

In the decades following the flood and suburbanization, Ansonia's Main Street fell into decline as retail shoppers decamped to the Ansonia Mall at its far end. (This was replaced with the Ansonia Shopping Center in the 90's) Later other malls attracted shoppers to nearby Milford, Trumbull, and Waterbury. Since the late 20th century, Main Street has been enlivened by the opening of several antique stores, a wine bar, a coffee shop, a Polish delicatessen, and other retail businesses.

For years, Ansonia had a daily newspaper, the "Evening Sentinel", that enjoyed a wide readership throughout the Naugatuck Valley. However, the parent company of the Connecticut Post bought the Sentinel in the 1980s and quickly closed it, despite their promises not to do so. Allegedly, the "Post" wanted to consolidate their position as the region's main newspaper. To provide an alternative, a non-profit, online-only news site, named The Valley Independent Sentinel in honor of the historic paper, has been organized and launched June 22, 2009.

In the early morning hours of November 6, 1960, Senator John F. Kennedy's presidential campaign motorcade stopped on its way to Waterbury for the candidate to make an appearance and brief address in front of City Hall. He drew thousands to downtown, many with transistor radios tuned to live reports on WADS of Senator Kennedy's progress towards Ansonia. President Kennedy returned to Ansonia on October 17, 1962, while on his way to Waterbury, but did not stop here.

President George H. W. Bush paid a visit to Ansonia by helicopter during the 1992 presidential election campaign. He was running far behind schedule due to severe weather damage to a large area of New Jersey. He arrived late and delivered a truncated speech, causing many residents in this heavily Democratic area to feel he had slighted their city.

In 2000, the Lower Naugatuck Valley, which includes Ansonia, was named an "All America City" by the National Civic League.

==== Rubber plant fire ====
In May 2001, a wind-driven fire destroyed the Latex Foam Company building, a very large rubber plant along the Naugatuck River in downtown Ansonia. The fire gutted the 284,000-square-foot (26,400 m^{2}) building, which was the workplace of 250 people. Firefighters from multiple counties fought the fire tirelessly for five days. Lingering clouds of foul-smelling smoke spread over the city and nearby communities, and chemical runoff produced by the fire unbalanced the ecosystem of the nearby river. The aforementioned Target store was constructed on the empty lot, opening in July 2007. Following the fire, the Latex Foam Company purchased a vacant plant off Route 110 in nearby Shelton and resumed production.

== Geography ==
According to the United States Census Bureau, the city has a total area of 6.2 square miles (16.0 km^{2}), of which 6.0 square miles (15.6 km^{2}) is land and 0.15 square miles (0.4 km^{2}), or 2.72%, is water. The city is bisected by the Naugatuck River and spreads out from the river's banks up the hills—some quite steep—of the river valley. On the west side of the river, the city abuts Derby and Seymour along Silver Hill. On the east side, the city's Hilltop neighborhood meets Woodbridge.

The land along the river is mostly given over to factory sites (both operational and defunct), with an area of wooded land on the west bank close to the city's northern boundary that belongs to the American Brass Company. In the early 1990s, this site was proposed by Texas company American Ref-Fuel for a solid waste-to-electric energy cogeneration plant. The proposal was controversial, and protests by residents resulted in its defeat.

Residential housing occupies most of the land in Ansonia, chiefly one- or two-family houses on plots of a 1/4 acre up to an acre. Larger houses on larger plots are found in the Hilltop neighborhood. The Ansonia Nature Center on Hilltop preserves some open fields and woodlands.

An airport once operated on Hilltop on a grass field, at the eastern edge of the city. During the Cold War, the United States military deployed Nike missiles in silos at the airport. Since the military released the airport grounds for other uses, developers have built residential housing there. The Nike base is now adapted as a horse farm with riding stables; few reminders of its former operations remain.

=== Neighborhoods ===
Downtown – The original industrial village and later borough of Ansonia. Includes the area stretching between the factories at the north side of down town to the newer shopping plazas on the south side of downtown (Marshalls, Home Goods, Target, etc.)

Library District – The neighborhood surrounding the Ansonia Library. Just east of downtown on top of the cliff. Includes the residential neighborhood between State Street and Beaver Street including South Cliff Street, North Cliff Street, Mott Street and Cottage Avenue. Contains mostly single-family historic Queen Anne Victorian homes. While now predominantly middle class, this area was settled early in Ansonia's history and was once home to many of the wealthy industrial families of Ansonia.

North End – The area comprising the North Main Street corridor stretching from Downtown to the Seymour Town line.

Reservoir – The area comprises the area of the Beaver, North Prospect, and Prospect Street corridors. It is along the Quillinan Reservoir.

Derby Hill – The area surrounding the Elm Street and Jewett Street area on the east side. Elm Street is also the town's historic district and was part of the original 1654 settlement of Derby. The name of this section of the town is sometimes disputed.

Hilltop – The area of the city that comprises the area of Prindle Avenue, Pulaski Highway and Ford Street corridors. This section was mainly farm land in the early days of the town. After World War II, it was developed as the largest residential area of the city.

West Ansonia – The residential village that comprised the west side of the Naugatuck River across from Ansonia (downtown). The original West Ansonia neighborhood consisted of High, Maple, and Jersey Streets (the latter somewhat redirected and now known as 'Olson Drive'), and later its name was synonymous with the entire present west side of the city.

Windy Hill – A section of West Ansonia centered around Murray, May, and Francis street. This area is considered to encompass the territory from the Derby Town line to Grove Street.

Silver Hill – The section of West Ansonia along the Silver Hill Road corridor. Parts of this section are shared with Derby.

=== Climate ===
The climate in this area is characterized by warm to hot, humid summers and generally cool to cold winters. According to the Köppen Climate Classification system, Ansonia has a humid continental climate, abbreviated "Dfa" on climate maps. Alternatively, it can be classified as humid subtropical ("Cfa") depending on which temperature isotherm for January is used.

== Demographics ==
Historical population
Census	Pop.	Note	%±
1870	2,749		—
1880	3,855		40.2%
1890	10,342		168.3%
1900	12,681		22.6%
1910	15,152		19.5%
1920	17,643		16.4%
1930	19,898		12.8%
1940	19,210		−3.5%
1950	18,706		−2.6%
1960	19,819		5.9%
1970	21,160		6.8%
1980	19,039		−10.0%
1990	18,403		−3.3%
2000	18,554		0.8%
2010	19,249		3.7%
2020	18,918		−1.7%
U.S. Decennial Census

=== 2020 census ===
As of the 2020 census, Ansonia had a population of 18,918. The median age was 39.8 years. 21.0% of residents were under the age of 18 and 15.4% of residents were 65 years of age or older. For every 100 females there were 93.3 males, and for every 100 females age 18 and over there were 89.9 males age 18 and over.

96.5% of residents lived in urban areas, while 3.5% lived in rural areas.

There were 7,570 households in Ansonia, of which 30.6% had children under the age of 18 living in them. Of all households, 38.4% were married-couple households, 20.2% were households with a male householder and no spouse or partner present, and 32.5% were households with a female householder and no spouse or partner present. About 28.4% of all households were made up of individuals and 10.9% had someone living alone who was 65 years of age or older.

There were 8,104 housing units, of which 6.6% were vacant. The homeowner vacancy rate was 1.5% and the rental vacancy rate was 5.2%.

Racial composition as of the 2020 census
Race	Number	Percent
White	11,796	62.4%
Black or African American	2,746	14.5%
American Indian and Alaska Native	68	0.4%
Asian	396	2.1%
Native Hawaiian and Other Pacific Islander	3	0.0%
Some other race	1,696	9.0%
Two or more races	2,213	11.7%
Hispanic or Latino (of any race)	4,493	23.7%

=== 2010 census ===
As of the 2010 census, the population of Ansonia was 19,249. The racial composition of the population was 77.6% white, 11.6% black or African American, 0.3% Native American, 1.9% Asian, 5.3% reporting some other race and 3.2% from two or more race. 16.7% of the population was Hispanic or Latino of any race.

=== 2000 census ===
As of the census of 2000, there were 18,554 people, 7,507 households, and 4,977 families residing in the city. The population density was 3,076.3 inhabitants per square mile (1,187.8/km^{2}). There were 7,937 housing units at an average density of 1,316.0 per square mile (508.1/km^{2}). The racial makeup of the city was 85.52% White, 8.42% Black or African American, 0.34% Native American, 1.13% Asian, 0.02% Pacific Islander, 2.22% from other races, and 2.37% from two or more races. Hispanic or Latino of any race were 7.42% of the population.

There were 7,507 households, out of which 31.4% had children under the age of 18 living with them, 46.1% were married couples living together, 15.6% had a female householder with no husband present, and 33.7% were non-families. 28.5% of all households were made up of individuals, and 12.3% had someone living alone who was 65 years of age or older. The average household size was 2.46 and the average family size was 3.03.

In the city, the population was spread out, with 24.2% under the age of 18, 8.2% from 18 to 24, 31.5% from 25 to 44, 20.7% from 45 to 64, and 15.5% who were 65 years of age or older. The median age was 37 years. For every 100 females, there were 90.6 males. For every 100 females age 18 and over, there were 86.9 males.

The median income for a household in the city was $43,026, and the median income for a family was $53,718. Males had a median income of $30,747 versus $28,517 for females. The per capita income for the city was $20,504. About 6.2% of families and 7.6% of the population were below the poverty line, including 12.3% of those under age 18 and 5.3% of those age 65 or over.

== Economy ==
Pulitzer Prize-winning author Theodore H. White referred to the Naugatuck Valley "as the seedbed of Yankee ingenuity" in his work The Making of the President, 1960. The city hosted the world headquarters of the Farrel Corporation, a leading producer of plastics and rubber processing equipment including the Banbury International Mixer. Ansonia Copper & Brass, which supplied metal rod, wire and tube products to manufacturers of finished commercial products, also was located in the city.

The Ansonia Clock Company started manufacturing Ansonia clocks in the city in 1851. The company moved to Brooklyn, New York in 1878 but retained its home city's name.

Since the late 20th century, much of the heavy industry has moved out, with jobs going overseas. The former factories sat vacant. In the late 1980s, the city began development of the Fountain Lake Commerce Park in the northwest border.

As a result of economic growth and plentiful employment in southwestern Connecticut, driven by corporate relocations from the New York City and Fairfield County metropolitan areas to nearby towns, Ansonia's housing market improved in the early 2000s.

== Mayors ==
Number	Name	Term Start	Term End	Term Length	Political Party
1	Arthur H. Bartholomew	1893	1895	2 years	Republican
2	Erwin Webster	1895	1897	2 years	Democrat
3	Franklin Burton	1897	1899	2 years	Democrat
4	Lockwood Hotchkiss	1899	1901	2 years	Republican
5	Stephen Charters	1901	1905	4 years	Democrat
6	Alton Farrel	1905	1906	1 year	Republican
7	Stephen Charters	1906	1912	6 years	Democrat
8	Franklin Burton	1912	1914	2 years	Democrat
9	John Schumacher	1914	1916	2 years	Democrat
10	John Mead	1916	1926	10 years	Democrat
11	Michael Cook	1926	1932	6 years	Democrat
12	Peter Hart	1932	1936	4 years	Republican
13	Andrew Nolan	1936	1945	9 years	Democrat
14	Thomas Nelligan	1945	1948	3 years	Democrat
15	Frank Fitzpatrick	1948	1952	4 years	Democrat
16	William Sheasby	1952	1956	4 years	Republican
17	Joseph Doyle	1956	1967	11 years	Democrat
18	Lester Hale	1967	1969	2 years	Democrat
19	James Martin	1969	1971	2 years	Republican
20	Sturgis Sobin	1971	1973	2 years	Republican
21	Michael Adanti	1973	1977	4 years	Democrat
22	Richard Krueger	1977	1977	< 1 year	Democrat
23	James Finnucan	1977	1983	6 years	Democrat
24	William Menna	1983	1987	4 years	Republican
25	Thomas Clifford	1987	1991	4 years	Democrat
26	Thomas Hallihan	1991	1995	4 years	Democrat
27	Nancy Valentine	1995	1999	4 years	Republican
28	James DellaVolpe	1999	2013	14 years	Democrat
29	David S. Cassetti	2013	2025	13 years	Republican
30	Frank Tyszka	2025			Democrat

Total number of mayors:

- Democrats: 20 (67%)
- Republicans: 10 (33%)

Total number of years:

- Democrats: 95 (75%)
- Republicans: 32 (25%)

Superlatives:

- Longest-serving Democrat: James DellaVolpe, 14 years (1999–2013)
- Longest-serving Republican: David S. Cassetti, 13 years (2013–2025)

=== Politics ===
Voter registration and party enrollment as of October 31, 2024
Party	Active voters	Inactive voters	Total voters	Percentage
Democratic	3,720	213	3,933	32.64%
Republican	2,077	148	2,225	18.46%
Unaffiliated	5,306	405	5,711	47.39%
Minor parties	170	12	182	1.51%
Total	11,273	778	12,051	100%

Presidential Election Results
Year	Democratic	Republican	Third parties
2024	49.4% 3,860	49.1% 3,838	1.4% 113
2020	53.7% 4,521	45.1% 3,797	1.2% 101
2016	47.2% 3,532	48.4% 3,621	4.3% 325
2012	61.3% 4,273	37.3% 2,596	1.4% 98
2008	60.3% 4,616	38.1% 2,918	1.6% 124
2004	54.3% 4,065	43.7% 3,272	2.1% 156
2000	61.0% 4,410	33.6% 2,431	5.4% 388
1996	55.5% 3,900	30.4% 2,132	14.1% 991 (Note: Perot (Reform): 859 (12.2%).)
1992	38.6% 3,273	38.6% 3,277	22.8% 1,931 (Note: Perot (Independent): 1,883 (22.2%).)
1988	49.6% 3,973	49.2% 3,942	1.2% 93
1984	35.1% 2,981	64.5% 5,482	0.4% 37
1980	43.5% 3,696	47.8% 4,064	8.7% 738 (Note: Anderson (Independent): 677 (8.0%).)
1976	48.3% 4,293	51.1% 4,539	0.6% 56
1972	39.1% 3,797	59.3% 5,758	1.6% 158
1968	50.5% 4,658	41.8% 3,854	7.7% 706 (Note: Wallace (American Independent): 706 (7.7%).)
1964	66.5% 6,376	33.5% 3,218	0.0% 0
1960	61.4% 6,135	38.6% 3,863	0.0% 0
1956	36.4% 3,539	63.6% 6,191	0.0% 0
1952	50.0% 5,155	49.6% 5,107	0.4% 45
1948	52.6% 5,072	44.9% 4,328	2.5% 245
1944	57.5% 5,083	42.5% 3,764	0.0% 0
1940	61.1% 5,548	38.9% 3,533	0.0% 0
1936	65.5% 5,109	34.5% 2,687	0.0% 0
1932	51.2% 3,666	48.8% 3,489	0.0% 0
1928	50.0% 3,269	49.1% 3,209	0.9% 64
1924	35.2% 2,033	54.6% 3,149	10.2% 588 (Note: La Follette (Progressive): 586 (10.2%).)
1920	39.4% 2,150	57.1% 3,115	3.5% 194
1916	48.7% 1,315	47.0% 1,269	4.2% 114
1912	37.7% 956	40.3% 1,022	22.0% 559 (Note: Roosevelt (Progressive): 406 (16.0%); Debs (Socialist): 127 (5.0%).)
1908	40.1% 1,029	56.6% 1,452	3.3% 85
1904	38.6% 993	59.1% 1,522	2.3% 58
1900	39.5% 991	59.4% 1,491	1.1% 29
1896	35.5% 865	61.8% 1,507	2.7% 65

== Transportation ==
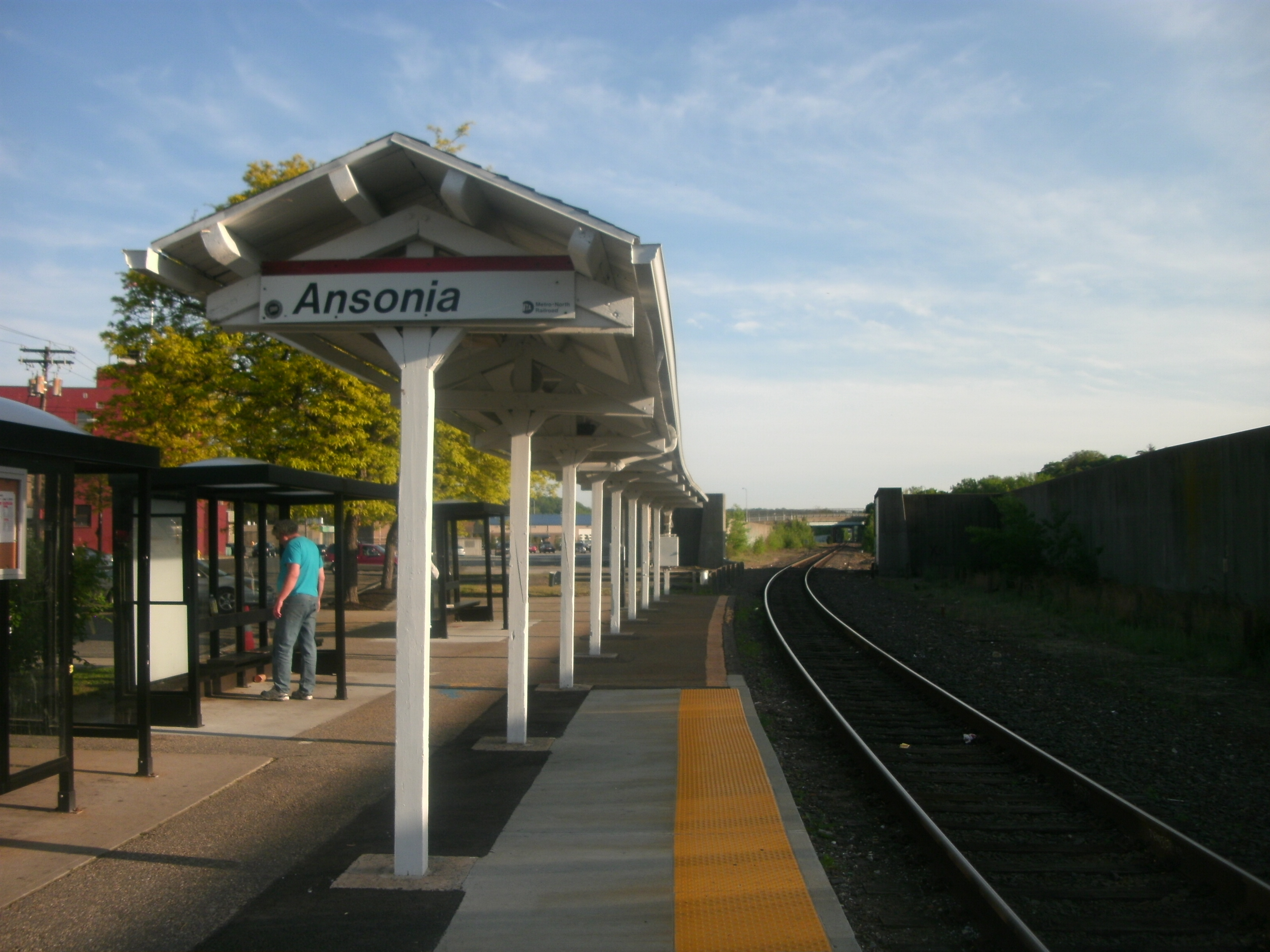
Ansonia Metro-North Railroad station, located on the Waterbury Branch line

Ansonia is a station stop on the Waterbury Branch of the Metropolitan Transit Authority's Metro-North Railroad system. Trains on the Waterbury Branch run from Waterbury in the north to Bridgeport in the south, allowing Ansonia residents access to New York City via transfer to the main line at Bridgeport. Travel time from Ansonia to Grand Central Terminal in New York City is approximately two hours.

=== Bus ===
Ansonia is also served by buses of the 255 route of Connecticut Transit New Haven, connecting the city to New Haven.

== Public safety ==
Ansonia is protected by three municipal public safety agencies. It operates an Office of Emergency Management-based out of City Hall and the A.R.M.S building on West Main Street.

=== Police department ===
The Ansonia Police Department was founded around 1880 when Ansonia was a borough in the Town of Derby and Daniel Hayes was appointed the first police chief of the department. Chief Hayes died in 1882 after he succumbed to his injuries day after when he was shot while making an arrest.

The Police Department has 42 sworn officers and 12 civilian personnel. The Police Department is split between the patrol and detective divisions. The Police Department headquarters is located in the renovated former headquarters of the Farrel Corporation on Main Street.

== Landmarks ==
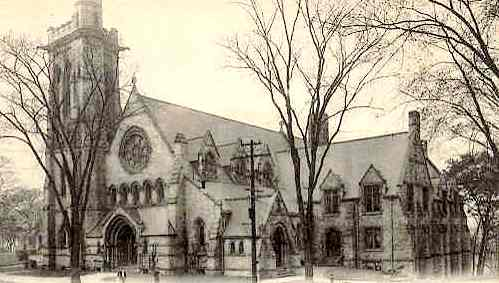
Christ Episcopal Church (1896), Henry Martyn Congdon, architect.

In addition to the Farrel Corporation and Ansonia Copper & Brass facilities along the banks of the Naugatuck River in the center of the city, Ansonia's landmarks include its public library (Ansonia Library), the Anna Sewell Memorial Fountain (honoring the author of "Black Beauty"), in front of the Library YMCA, National Guard Armory and many Victorian and Queen Anne houses. The prominent Ansonia Opera House is the oldest opera house in Connecticut built in 1870.

Ansonia is noted for its many churches and places of worship, including those forming five Catholic parishes, each historically associated with a particular ethnic group: Saint Joseph (Polish), Holy Rosary (Italian), Saint Anthony (Lithuanian; now combined with Holy Rosary), Our Lady of the Assumption (Irish), and Saints Peter and Paul (Ukrainian). There are also Congregationalist, Methodist, Episcopal, African Methodist Episcopal, Baptist, Russian Orthodox, Greek Orthodox, Pentecostal and other Christian denominations, as well as a Buddhist temple.

In the mid-1930s, after its original high school that was located on Prospect Street (now a City park) burned down, a new one was built on Howard Avenue. This is notable in that the building was designed by William Lescaze, one of the pioneers of modernism in American architecture. When it opened in 1936, it was one of the first "modern" high school buildings in the country. The former high school became Ansonia Middle School in 1999 when a new Ansonia High School was built at 20 Pulaski Highway in the Hilltop section of the city.

== Notable people ==
- Ralph Beardsley (1891–1920), racing driver
- Charles F. Brooker (1847–1926), state politician and business executive
- Tom Condon, attorney, National Football League agent, and former professional football player, Kansas City Chiefs and New England Patriots
- John Cooke (1937–2005), gold medal in rowing, 1956 Summer Olympics
- William J. Cousins (1924–2013), sociologist
- Joseph P. Flynn, chief judge, Connecticut Appellate Court
- AR Fox, professional wrestler
- Samuel B. Gould (1910–1997), educator and innovator
- Lorenzo Greene (1899–1998), historian, African-American history pioneer, and the first African-American graduate of Ansonia High School
- David Humphreys (1752–1818), George Washington's aide-de-camp, diplomat, legislator, and the nation's first presidential speechwriter
- Vincent R. Impellitteri (1900–1987), Mayor of New York City from 1950 to 1953
- General Samuel Jaskilka (1919–2012), former assistant commandant of the U.S. Marine Corps
- Loosey LaDuca, drag queen
- Pierre Lallement (1843–1891), inventor of the first pedaled rotary crank mechanism bicycle
- Sandy Osiecki, professional football player
- Anson Greene Phelps (1781–1853), founder of Phelps, Dodge mining and copper company, and Ansonia's founder
- Nick Pietrosante (1937–1988), former professional football player, Cleveland Browns and Detroit Lions, and former NFL Rookie of the Year
- Pincus "Pinky" Silverberg (1904–1964), boxer and 1927 flyweight world champion
- Bob Skoronski, former professional football player, Green Bay Packers and member of Super Bowl I and Super Bowl II championship teams
- Al Tinney (1921–2002), jazz pianist
- Reuben Henry Tucker III (1911–1970), U.S. Army colonel during World War II referenced in Cornelius Ryan's A Bridge Too Far

== On the National Register of Historic Places ==
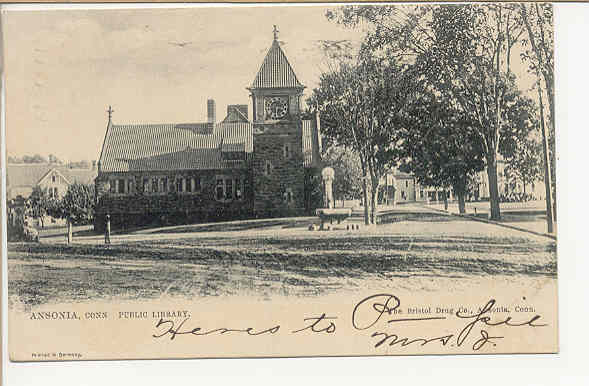
Ansonia Library (1892), George Keller, architect

- Ansonia Library – 53 South Cliff Street (added September 23, 1985)
- Gen. David Humphreys House – 37 Elm Street (added April 17, 1972)
- Richard Mansfield House – 35 Jewett Street (added April 11, 1971)
- Upper Main Street Historic District (Ansonia, Connecticut) – 36–100, 85–117 Main Street (added 1982), which includes the Ansonia Opera House (built 1870)
- United States Post Office–Ansonia Main – 237 Main Street (added 1985)

== Gallery ==
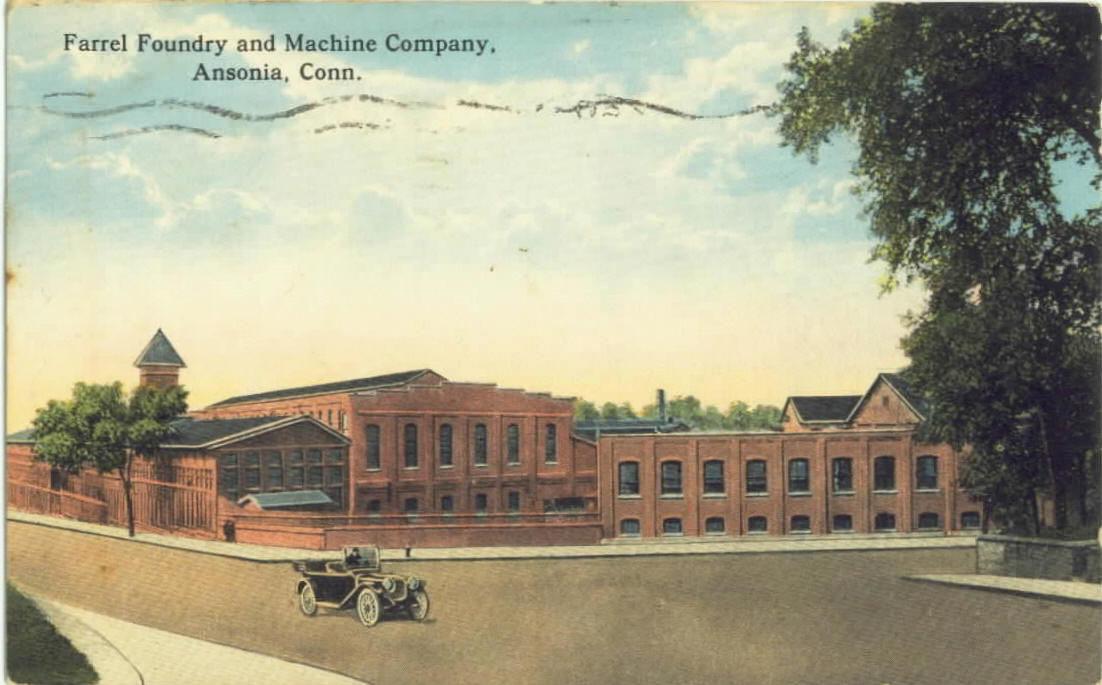
Farrel factory, c. 1917

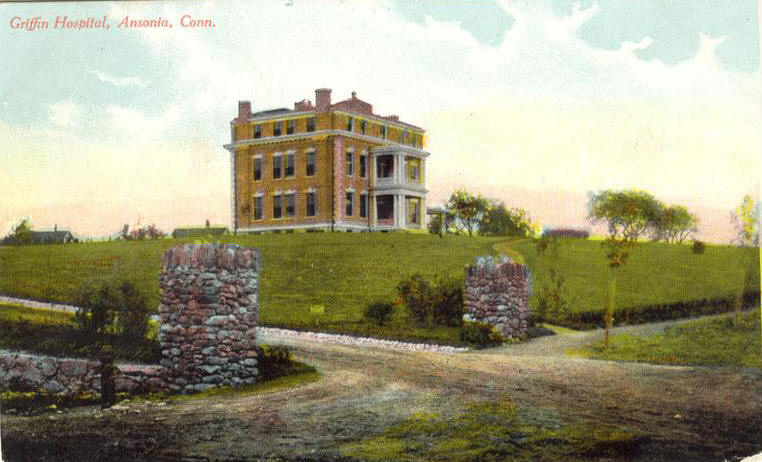
Griffin Hospital, c. 1906

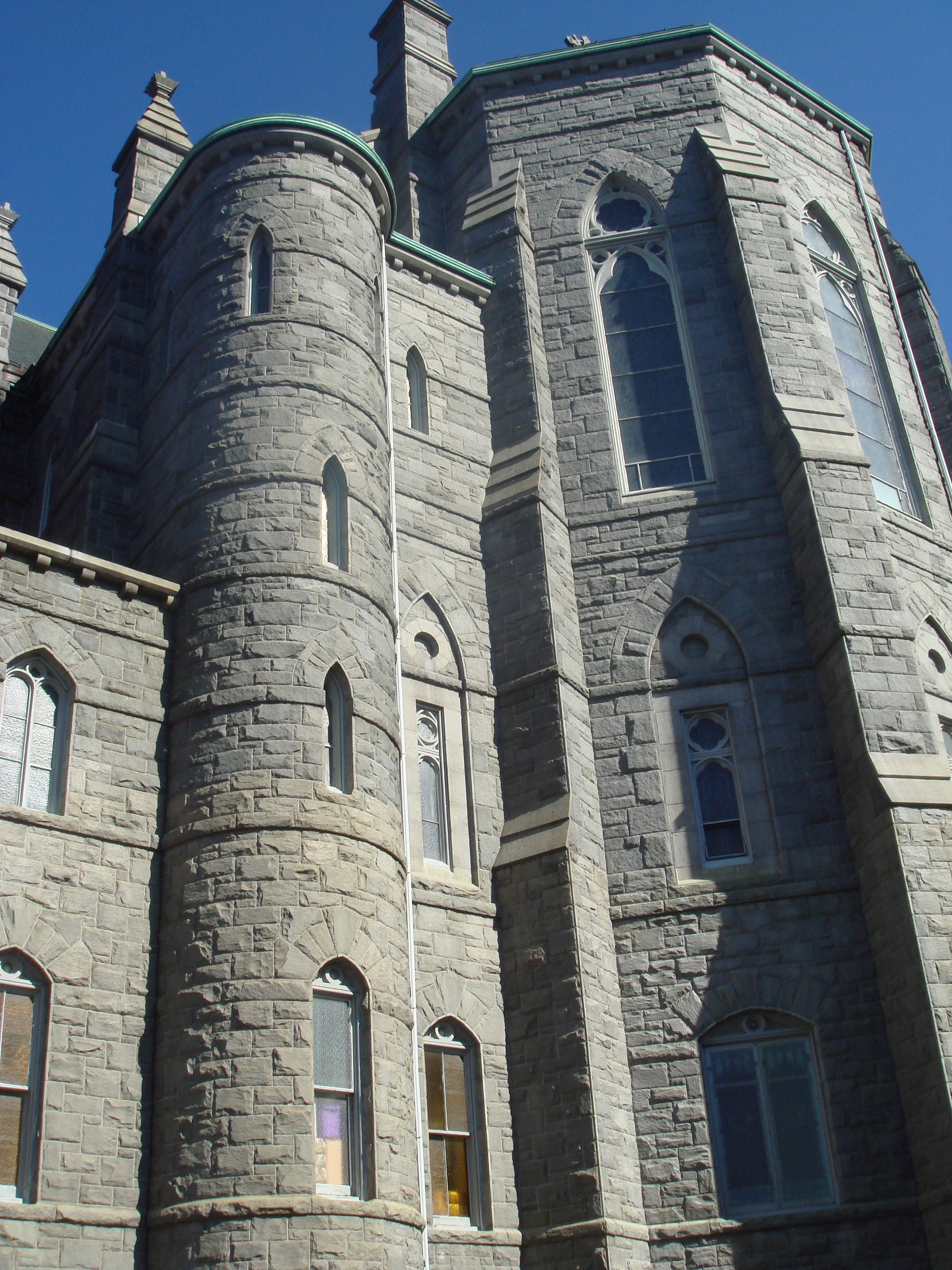
Our Lady of the Assumption Church, built 1891

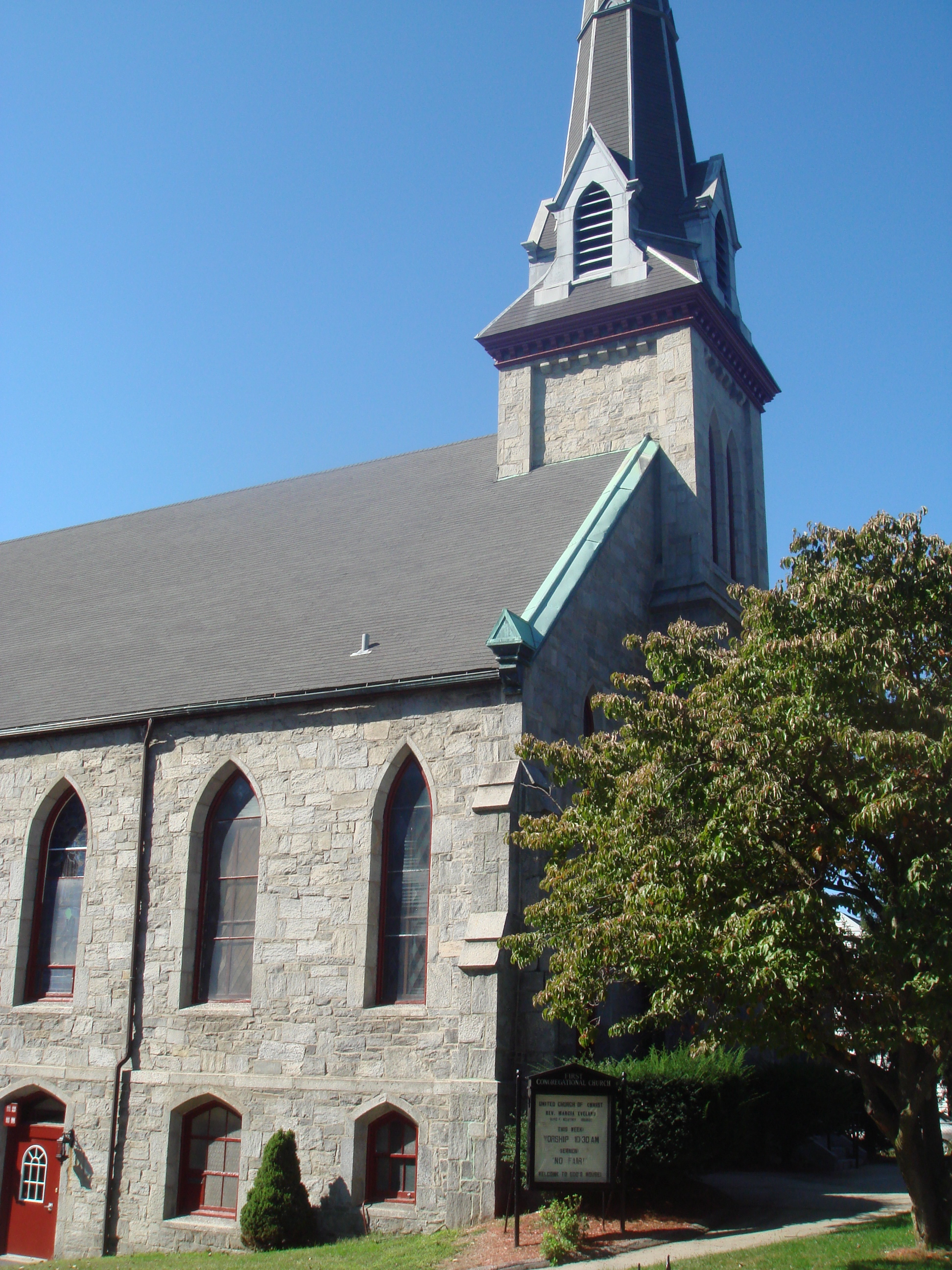
First Congregational Church of Ansonia

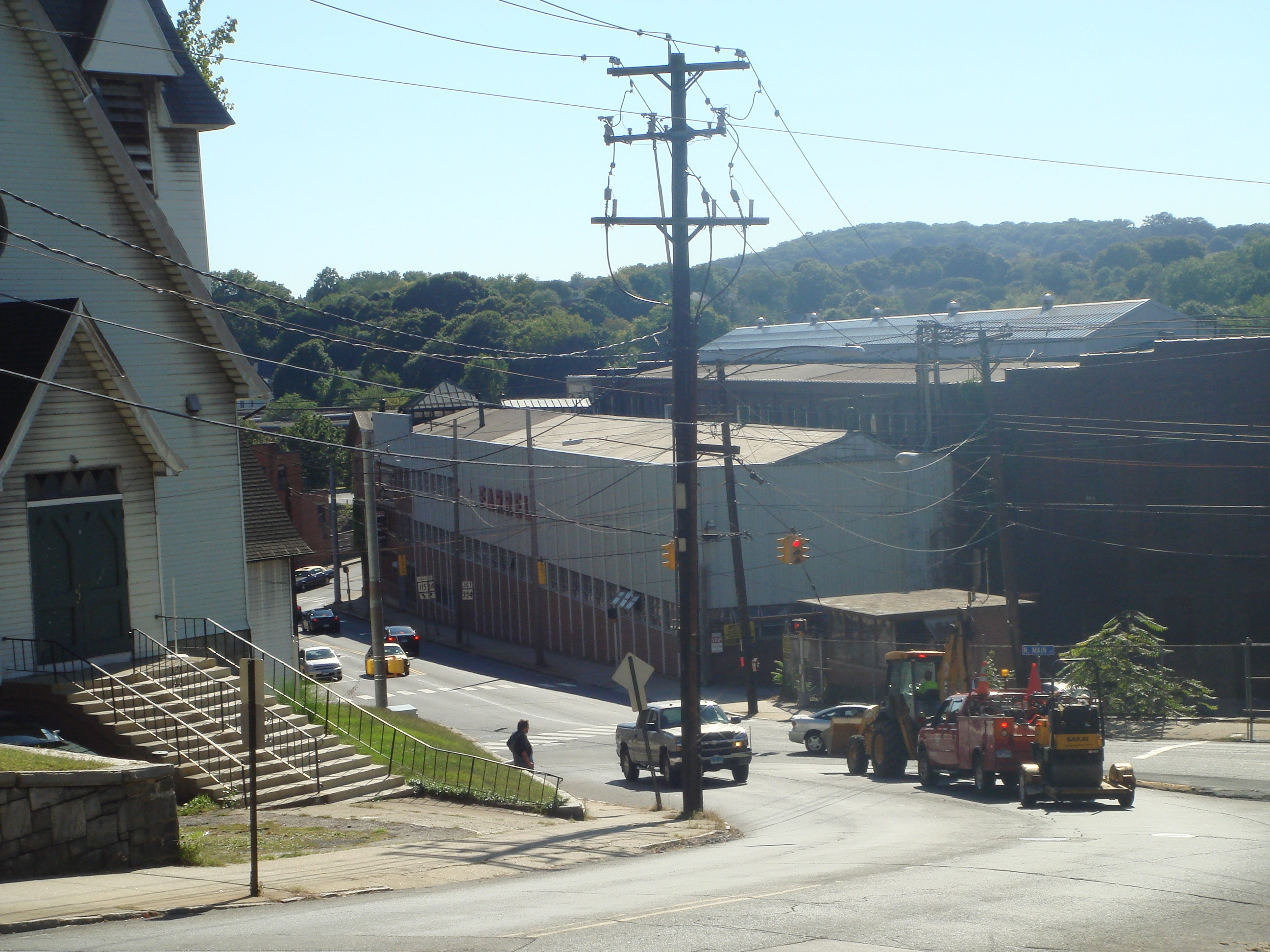
Farrel building

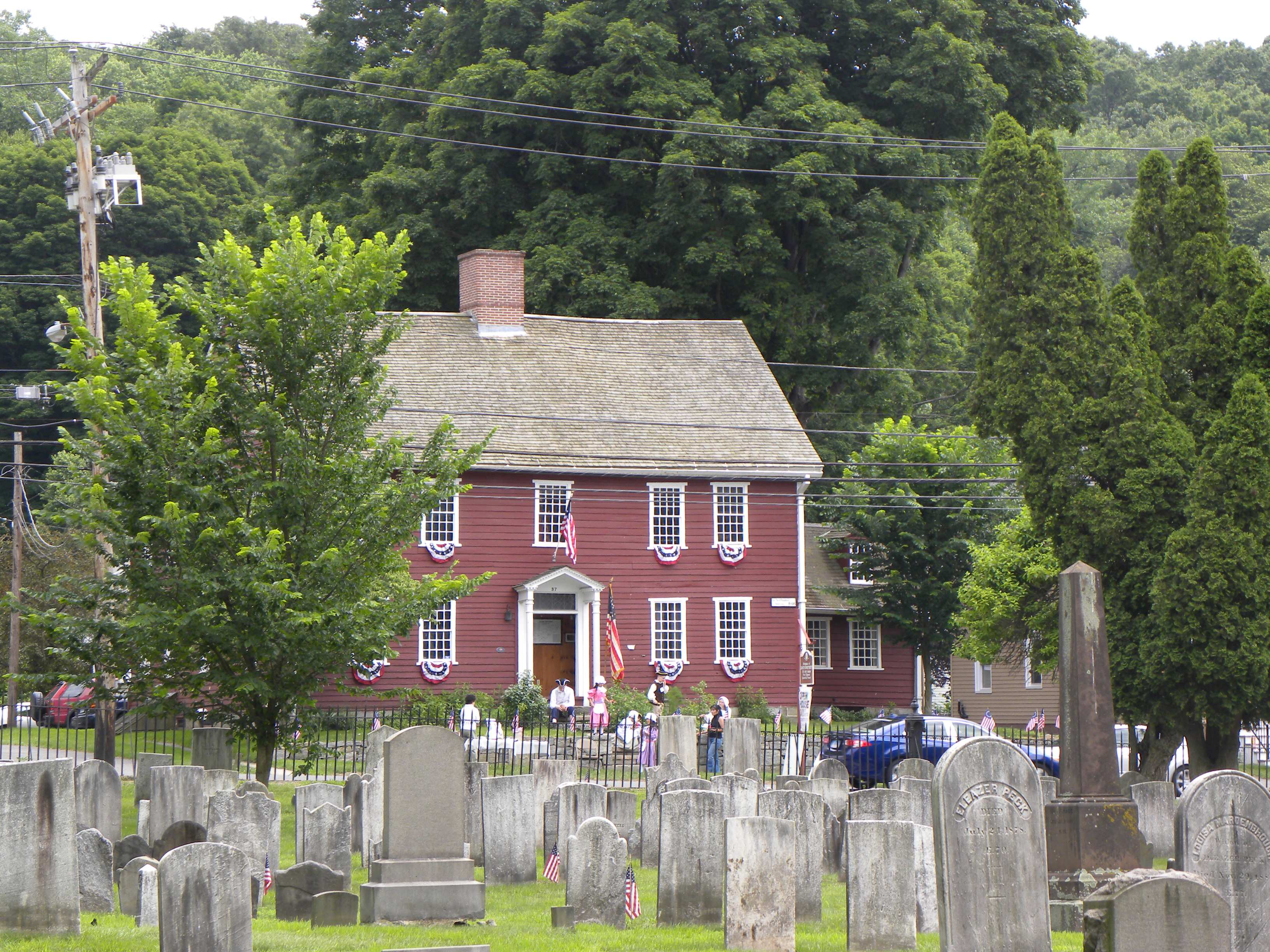
The David Humphreys home, built in 1698, is now maintained by the Derby Historical Society. It is located at 37 Elm Street, Ansonia.

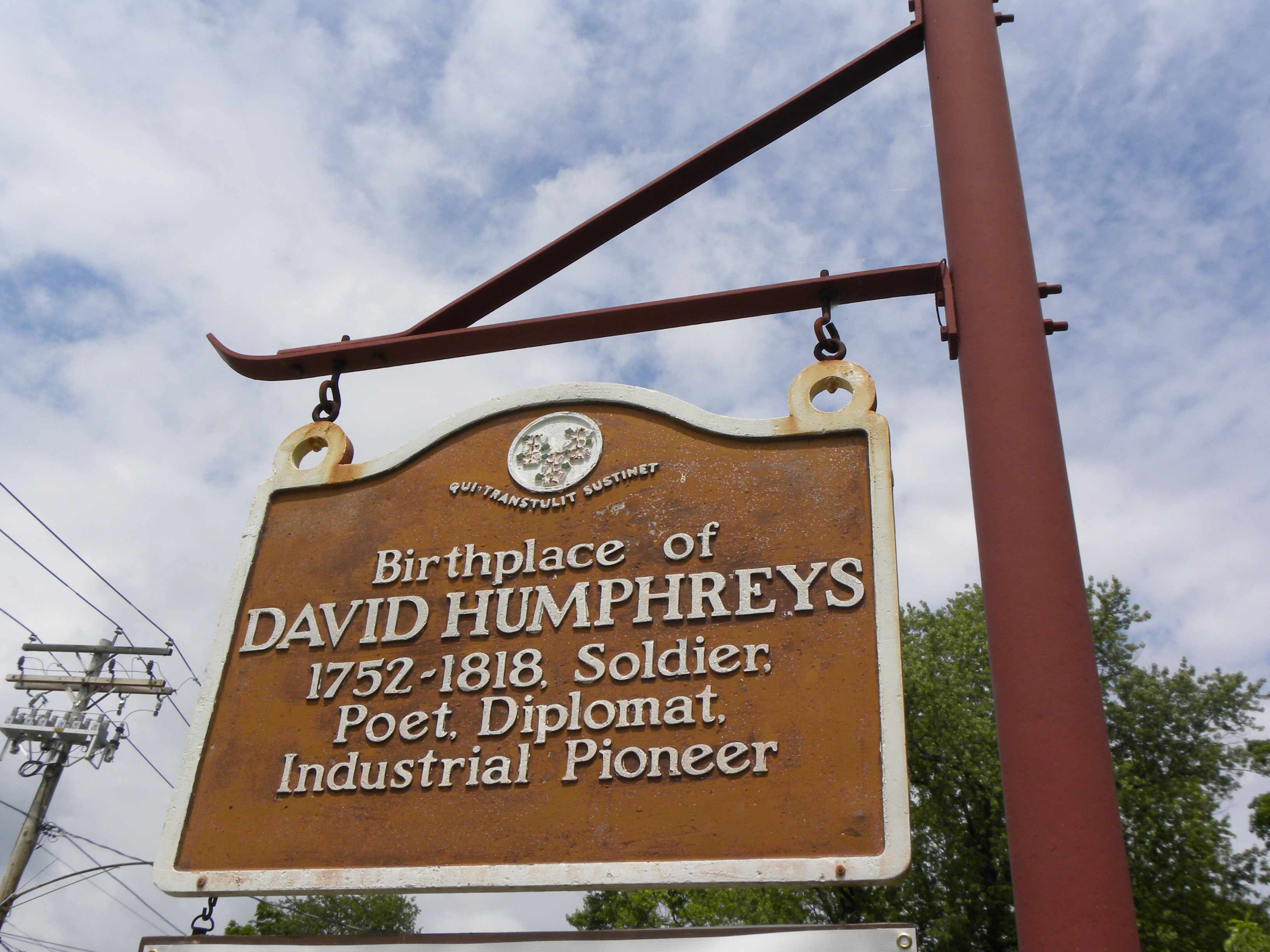
Signpost for the David Humphreys home at 37 Elm Street

== See also ==
- 1955 Connecticut floods
- Ansonia Black Knights
- Ansonia Clock Company, originating in Ansonia before moving to New York
- Ansonia High School
- History of the bicycle, which was invented by Pierre Lallement in Ansonia
- List of high school football rivalries more than 100 years old
