= American Brass Company =

Inactive brass manufacturing company

- Type: Public
- Industry: Brass manufacturing
- Founded: 1834 (as the Wolcottville Brass Company)
- Headquarters: Wolcottville, Connecticut (now Torrington, Connecticut)
- Area served: United States
- Key people: Israel Coe, co-founder John Hungerford, co-founder Anson Greene Phelps, co-founder
- Products: Sheet, rolled and wire brass; brass tubing; brass fixtures; brass items such as clocks, gun and shell casings, electrical busses; etc.

The American Brass Company was an American brass manufacturing company based in Connecticut and active from 1893 to 1960. The company's predecessors were the Wolcottville Brass Company and the Ansonia Brass and Battery Company. It was the first large brass manufacturing firm in the United States, and for much of its existence was the largest brass manufacturer in the country. It was purchased by the Anaconda Copper Company in 1922, and merged into Anaconda's other brass manufacturing concerns (losing its identity and name in the process) in 1960.

== Early history ==
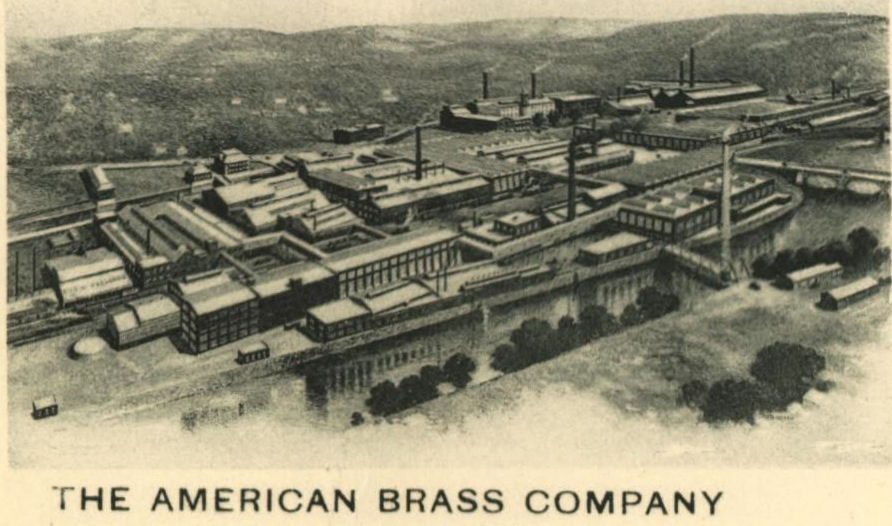
American Brass Company plant in Ansonia, Connecticut, in 1921.

In 1834, Israel Coe, a Connecticut farmer; John Hungerford, a Connecticut businessman; and Anson Greene Phelps, co-founder of the Phelps Dodge mining company, founded a brass mill in Wolcottville, Connecticut (now known as Torrington, Connecticut). The brass mill manufactured kettles and a limited number of brass buttons. The manufacturing works and most of the skilled workers had to be imported from Great Britain. This was not without significant physical danger, as British companies did not wish to lose their competitive edge and market share. Some skilled workers left England hidden in wooden casks. In 1841, the company went public: $51,000 in stock was issued to Coe, Hungerford and Phelps, and the company name changed to the Wolcottville Brass Company. The company now began to produce mostly rolled and sheet brass.

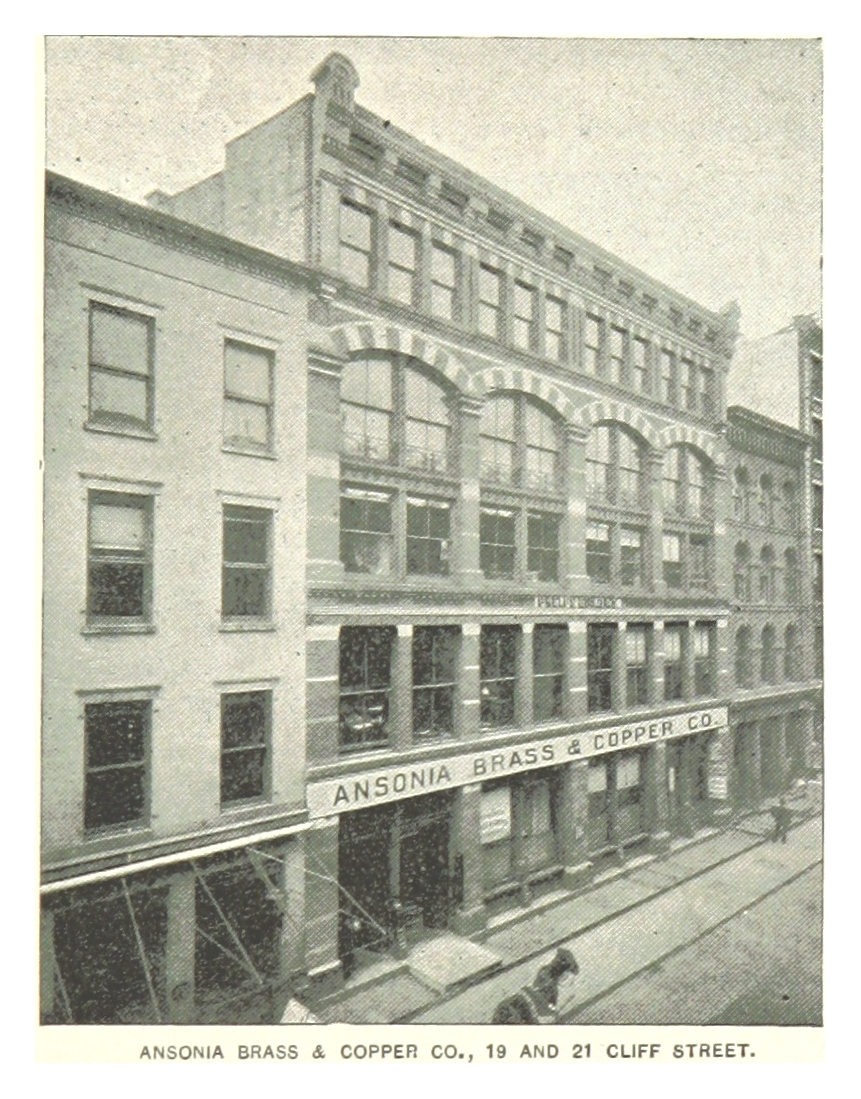
Ansonia Brass & Copper Co office in Manhattan, Ca 1890

Anson Phelps purchased a large parcel of land at what is now Ansonia, Connecticut, in 1844. He founded the town of Ansonia, and built a dam across the Naugatuck River. He also built a canal and water reservoirs, and established a copper rolling mill. Phelps named the new company the Ansonia Brass and Battery Company ("battery" being the term then in use for hammering sheets of metal into kettles). Phelps later added a brass mill and a brass wire mill, and in 1869 added the manufacture of clocks to the company's business. On January 1, 1878, the clock business was spun off as the Ansonia Clock Company. In 1863, Lyman W. Coe, brother of Israel Coe, founded the Coe Brass Manufacturing Company in Torrington.

In 1892, Ansonia Brass sued inventor Alfred A. Cowles for patent infringement. The case went to the U.S. Supreme Court. In a major ruling in patent law, the Court held that merely applying an old process to a new and analogous purpose was not a patentable process, and voided Cowles' patent.

== Formation ==
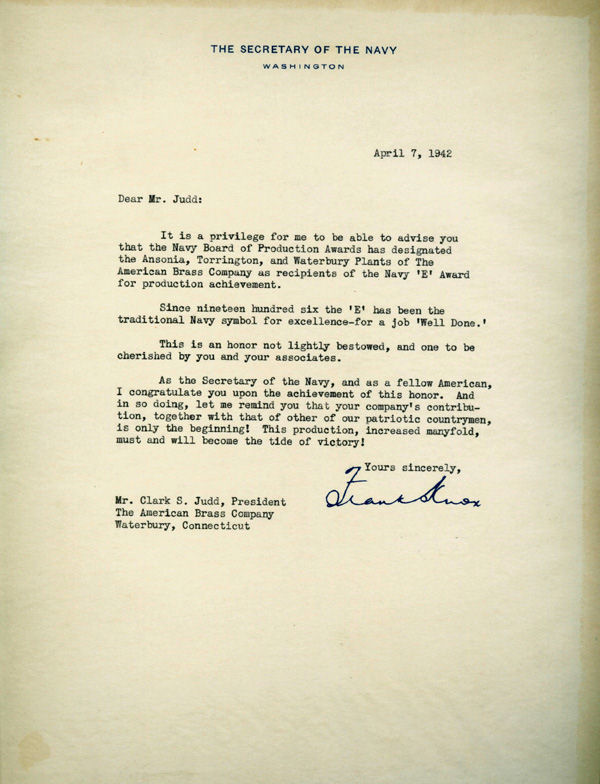
Letter awarding the Army-Navy ‘E’ Award for excellence in production to Mr. Clark S. Judd, President, American Brass Company, from Frank Knox, Secretary of the Navy.

The American Brass Company was formed on June 7, 1893, as a holding company for six brass manufacturing companies: Plume & Atwood Manufacturing Company; Benedict & Burnham Manufacturing Company; Waterbury Brass Company; Scovill Manufacturing Company; Holmes, Booth and Haydens; and Coe Brass Manufacturing Company. Disagreements over which companies would manufacture which goods delayed formal incorporation until March 1, 1899. All the firms except for the Waterbury Brass Company and the Coe Brass Manufacturing Company withdrew from the new corporation. But the Ansonia Brass and Battery Company joined the new firm in their place. American Brass began operation on December 14, 1899. There were about 10,000 brass workers in the United States in 1900, and half of them worked for American Brass. Benedict & Burnham and Holmes, Booth and Haydens became part of American Brass in 1901. By 1909, American Brass manufactured two-thirds of all the brass in the United States, consumed one-third of all copper produced in the country, and was the largest fabricator of nonferrous metals in the world.

But the company failed to eliminate duplication in its manufacturing plants, and its administration remained decentralized. Until 1922, American Brass was one of the few companies whose structure consisted of autonomous businesses. Scovill Manufacturing, Inc., the next largest brass manufacturer, was able to expand its market share significantly as American Brass lagged. Despite its managerial challengers, American Brass was still a highly innovative company. It developed and patented a process for constructing hollow and ventilated busses from rectangular copper bars. The company also developed numerous new and unique metallurgical processes and alloys.

On January 1, 1912, the companies held by American Brass were dissolved and all of the firm's divisions began operating under the name of the American Brass Company. The company also expanded, taking over the Chicago Brass Company of Kenosha, Wisconsin; Waterbury Brass Goods Corporation; and the Ansonian Land and Water Power Company. In June 1917, American Brass bought the Buffalo Copper and Brass Rolling Mills, the largest independent brass rolling mill in the country (one which employed 5,000 people). The company had 70 mills in 1917. During World War I, American Brass employed 16,000 workers and produced 1 billion pounds of material. In 1921, the company was the victim of a major embezzlement scandal, after a cashier in the headquarters office absconded with $100,000 in cash and fled to Italy to avoid prosecution.

== Purchase and dissolution by Anaconda Copper Co. ==
In 1922, the Anaconda Copper Mining Company (of Montana) acquired American Brass The merger was one of the largest deals in American business up to that time. That year, Anaconda achieved the largest revenue in corporate history to date ($175,450,384), due primarily to the acquisition of American Brass. Anaconda Copper used American Brass' position as the dominant firm in the brass manufacturing industry to engage in price-fixing.

The division also expanded rapidly in Canada. This had significant consequences for the company, and led to a major tax case in Canada. From 1922 to 1937, Anaconda American Brass used the FIFO method of accounting. In 1937, however, the company moved to LIFO accounting. The Canada Customs and Revenue Agency took issue with this accounting change, and in 1947 sued to recover tax revenues under the Excess Profits Tax Act of 1940. In 1956, the Supreme Court of Canada held in Minister of National Revenue vs. Anaconda American Brass Ltd. A.C. 85 (1956) that LIFO was not allowed for tax purposes in Canada. As of 2000, the case still provided the legal precedence for LIFO not being allowed for tax purposes in Canada.

The company retained its own identity until 1960 when the name was changed to Anaconda American Brass.

== Post-Anaconda ownership ==
In 1977, Anaconda American Brass was acquired by the Atlantic Richfield Company (ARCO). After years of declining profits, ARCO sold American Brass to the Buffalo Brass Company. American Brass was acquired in 1990 by the Finnish Outokumpu Oyj Mining Company.

In 2005, American Brass was sold by Outokumpu to the Swedish investment firm Nordic Capital for $800 million, and was renamed Luvata Brass. In 2011, the company was acquired for about $370 million by Aurubis AG, a German copper company. In 2018, Aurubis announced a proposal of sale of its entire flat rolled product division - including the Buffalo, NY location - to the Wieland Werke AG, a privately held German metal producer.
