= Naugatuck Valley Planning Region, Connecticut =

Naugatuck Valley Council of Governments (NVCOG)
- Planning region
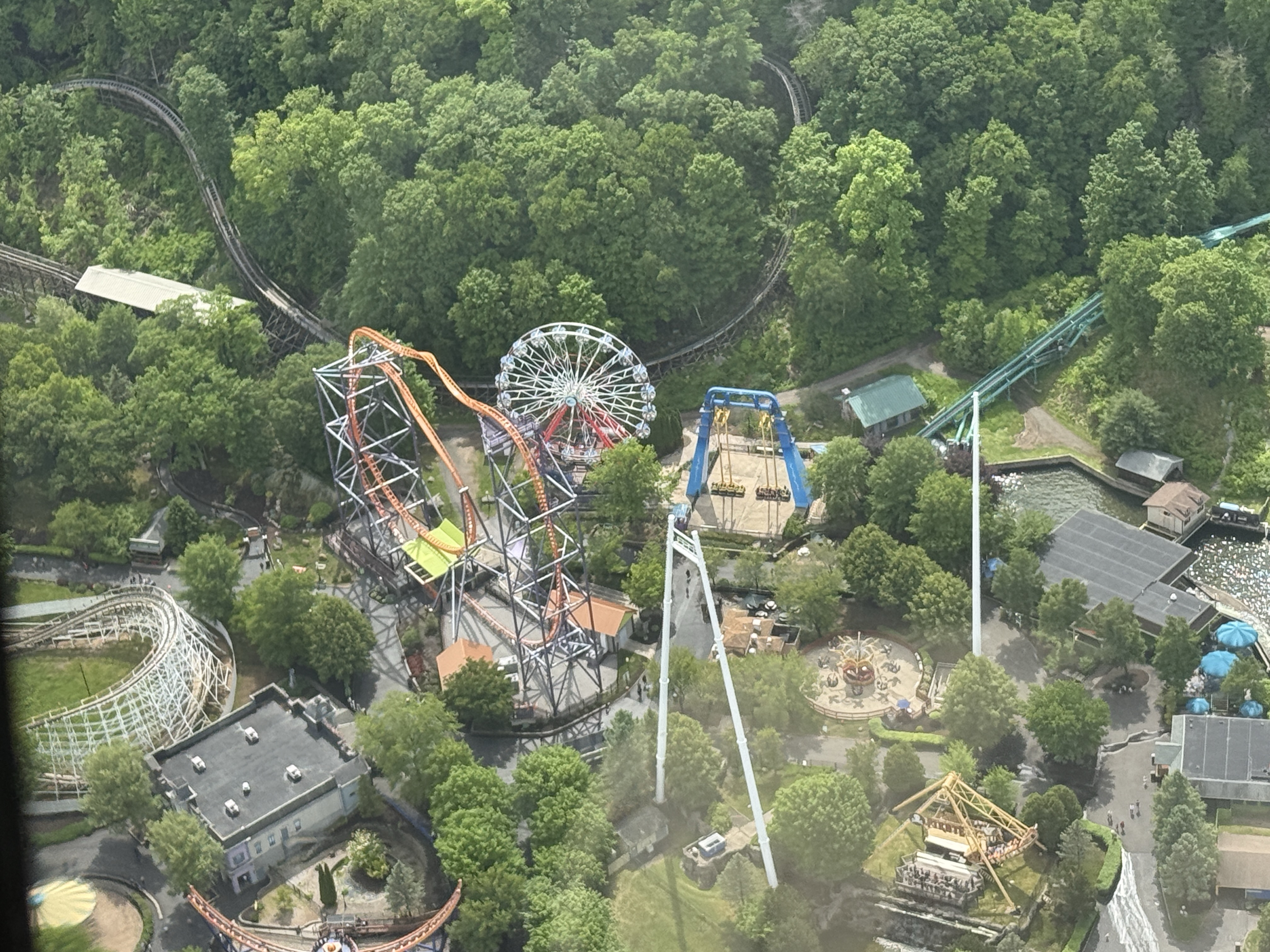
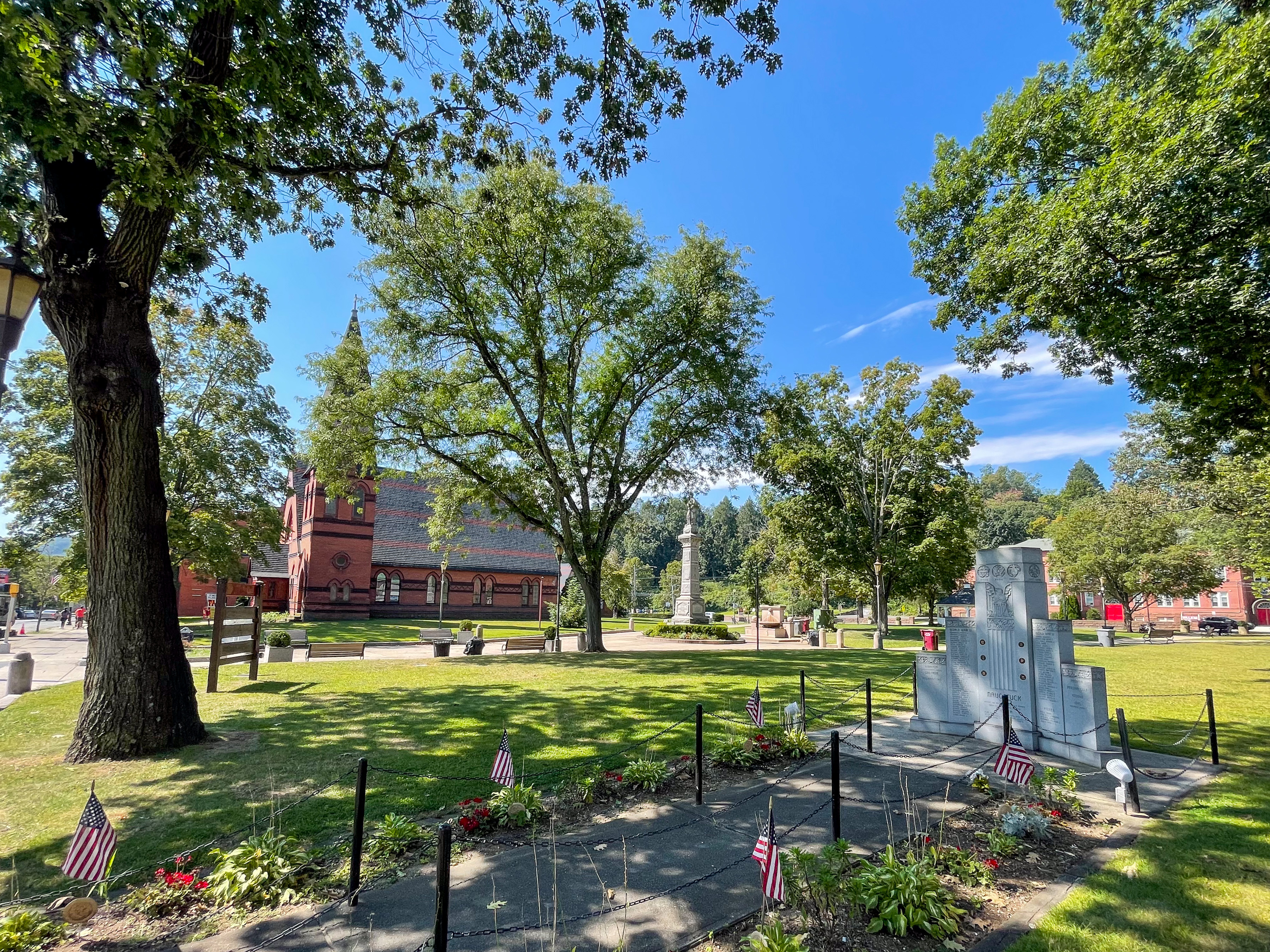
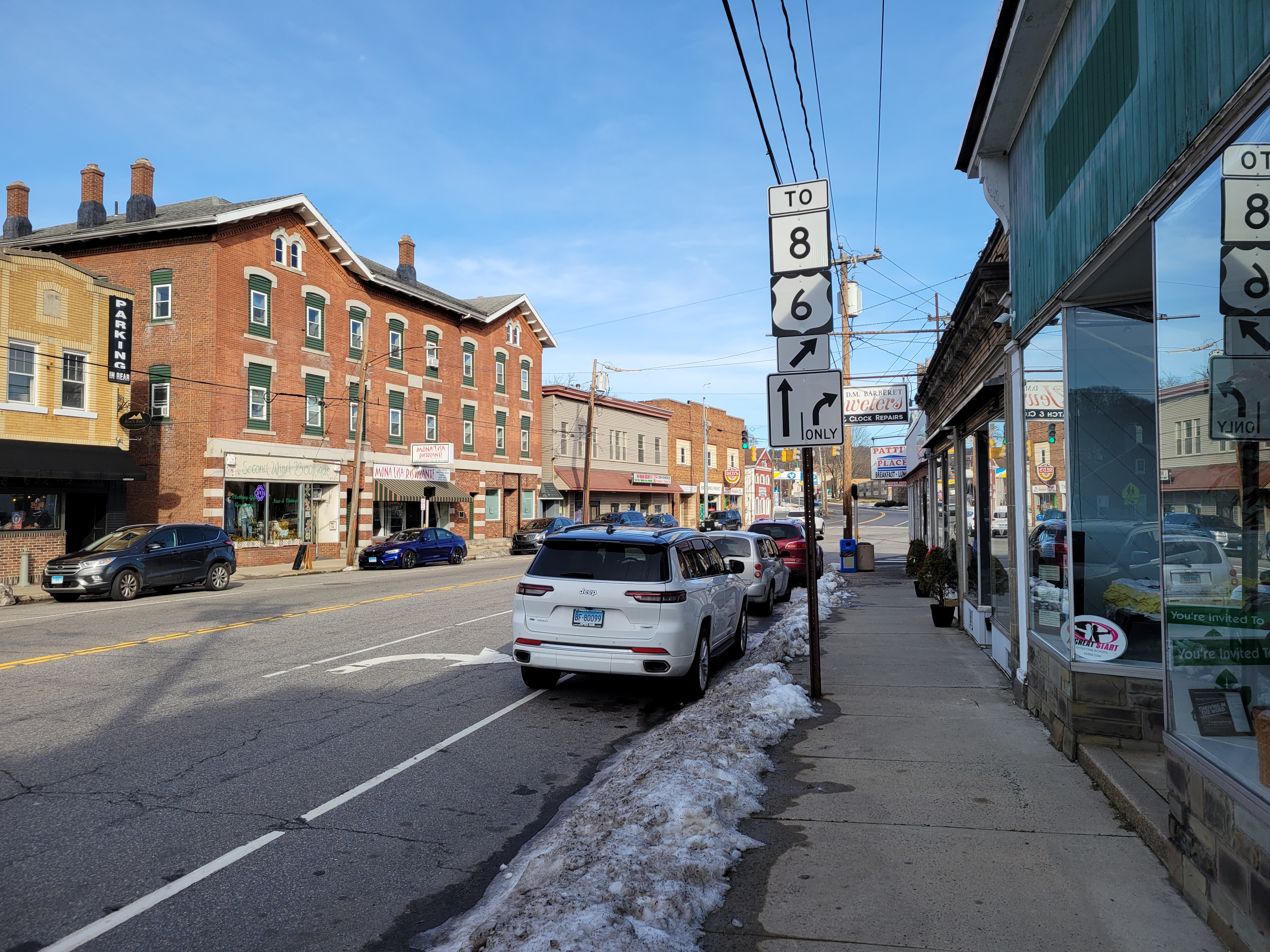
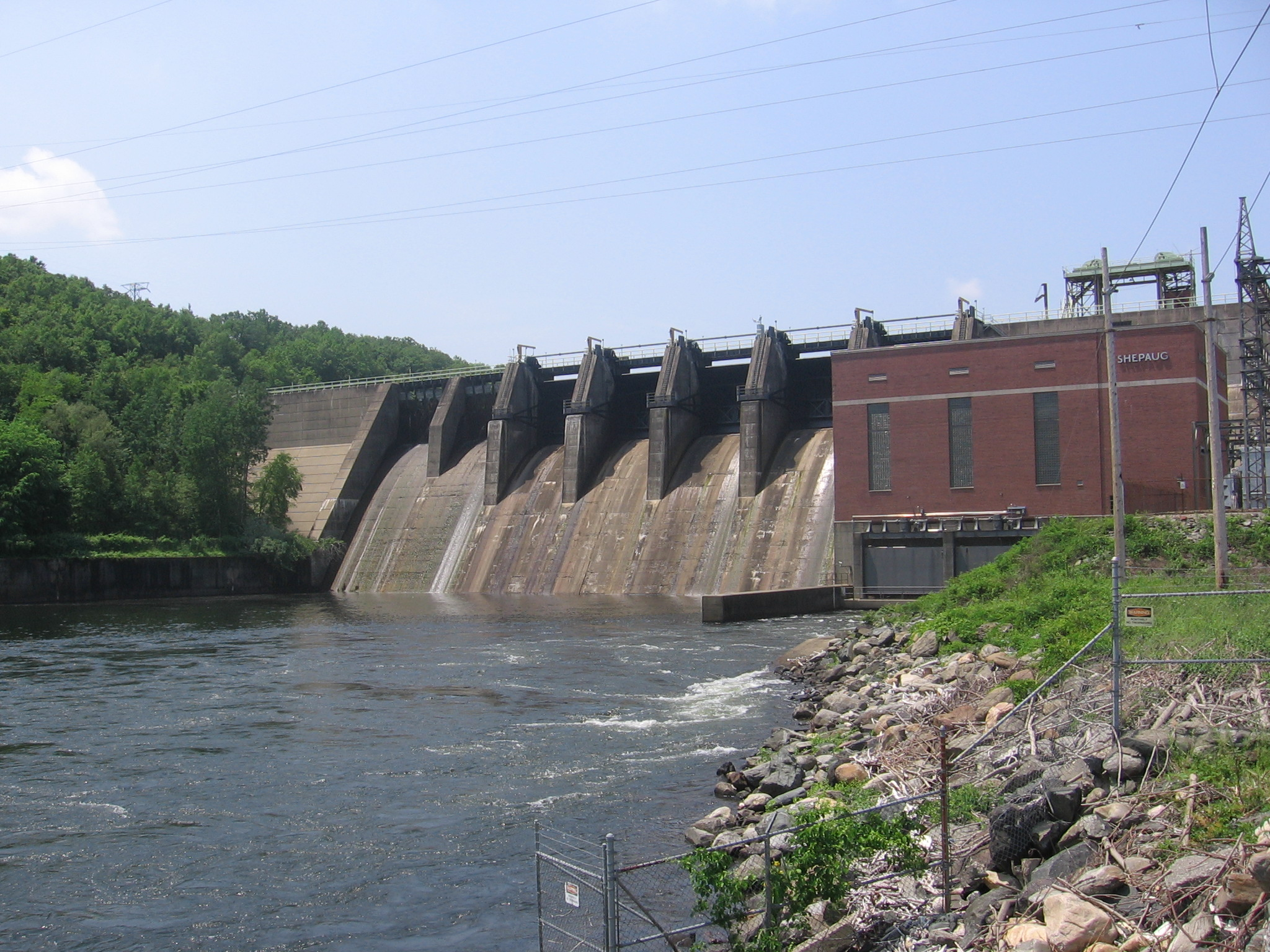
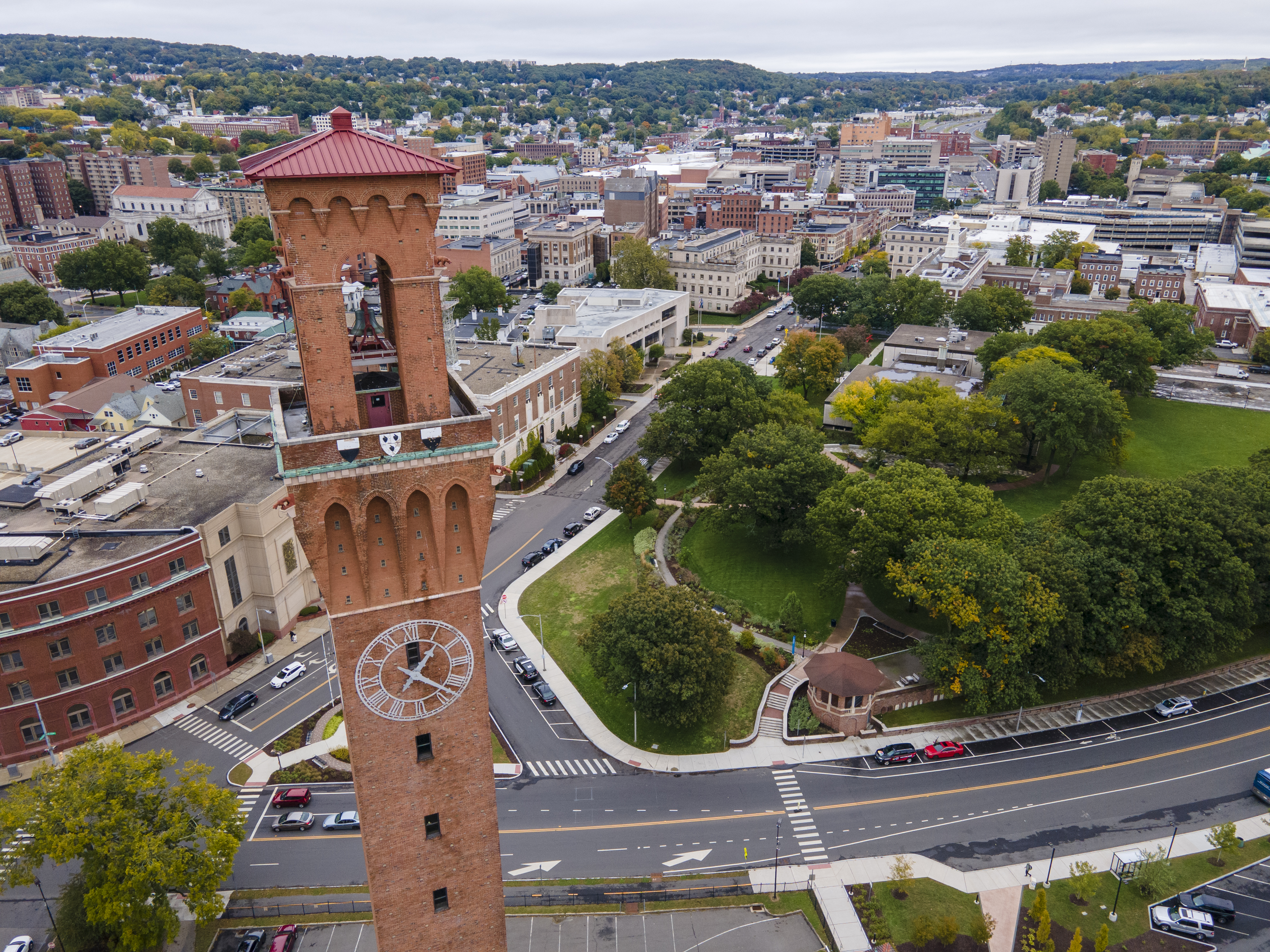
- From top left: Lake Compounce in Bristol, Town Green in Naugatuck, Main Street in Thomaston, Shepaug Dam in Southbury, Downtown Waterbury Historic District

- Logo

- Location within the U.S. state of Connecticut
- Coordinates: 41°31′N 73°07′W
- Country: United States
- State: Connecticut
- Founded: 2013
- Largest city: Waterbury
- Other cities: Bristol, Shelton, Ansonia, Derby

Government
  - Executive Director: Rick Dunne

Area
  - Total: 412.8 sq mi (1,069 km^{2})

Population (2020)
  - Total: 450,376
  - Estimate (2025): 463,349 ▲
  - Density: 1,090.13/sq mi (420.90/km^{2})
- Time zone: UTC−5 (Eastern)
  - Summer (DST): UTC−4 (EDT)
- Congressional districts: 1st, 3rd, 4th, 5th
- Website: nvcogct.gov

Interactive map of the Naugatuck Valley Planning Region

The Naugatuck Valley Planning Region is a planning region and county-equivalent in the U.S. state of Connecticut. It is served by the coterminous Naugatuck Valley Council of Governments (NVCOG). In 2022, planning regions were approved to replace Connecticut's counties as county-equivalents for statistical purposes, with full implementation occurring by 2024.

== Geography ==
The Naugatuck Valley Planning Region lies in west-central Connecticut, spanning urban centers and rural towns along the Naugatuck River. The region covers approximately 412.8 sq mi and includes both densely populated cities like Waterbury and Shelton, and smaller towns such as Bethlehem and Oxford. Major transportation routes such as Interstate 84 and Route 8 serve as key regional corridors.

== Demographics ==
Historical population
Census	Pop.	Note	%±
1790	8,198		—
1800	10,097		23.2%
1810	8,903		−11.8%
1820	19,611		120.3%
1830	19,231		−1.9%
1840	19,868		3.3%
1850	25,207		26.9%
1860	39,305		55.9%
1870	47,187		20.1%
1880	64,816		37.4%
1890	82,125		26.7%
1900	110,865		35.0%
1910	154,112		39.0%
1920	200,514		30.1%
1930	223,036		11.2%
1940	229,609		2.9%
1950	256,323		11.6%
1960	310,233		21.0%
1970	362,719		16.9%
1980	381,620		5.2%
1990	413,851		8.4%
2000	428,790		3.6%
2010	448,738		4.7%
2020	450,376		0.4%
2025 (est.)	463,349	▲	2.9%
U.S. Decennial Census

As of the 2020 United States census, there were 450,376 people living in the Naugatuck Valley Planning Region.

== Government and Planning ==
The region is governed by the Naugatuck Valley Council of Governments (NVCOG), which provides shared services and regional planning coordination. NVCOG oversees long-term transportation, land use, environmental, and economic strategies, and works with the U.S. Economic Development Administration (EDA) to implement the region’s Comprehensive Economic Development Strategy (CEDS).

== Municipalities ==
The following municipalities are members of the Naugatuck Valley Region:

=== Cities ===
- Ansonia
- Bristol
- Derby
- Shelton
- Waterbury

=== Towns ===
- Beacon Falls
- Bethlehem
- Cheshire
- Middlebury
- Naugatuck
- Oxford
- Plymouth
- Prospect
- Seymour
- Southbury
- Thomaston
- Watertown
- Wolcott
- Woodbury
