= St. John's Protestant Episcopal Church =

St. John's Protestant Episcopal Church may refer to:

- St. John's Protestant Episcopal Church (Stamford, Connecticut), listed on the National Register of Historic Places in Fairfield County, Connecticut
- St. John's Protestant Episcopal Church (Baltimore, Maryland), listed on the National Register of Historic Places in Baltimore County, Maryland
- St. John's Protestant Episcopal Church (Yonkers, New York), listed on the National Register of Historic Places in Westchester County, New York
- St. John's Protestant Episcopal Church (Charleston, South Carolina)
