= H. Edwards Ficken =

American architect (1852–1929)

Henry Edwards Ficken
- Born: May 25, 1852; London, England
- Died: January 26, 1929 (aged 76); New York City
- Occupation: Architect
- Practice: Ficken & Smith; Gambrill & Ficken; H. Edwards Ficken

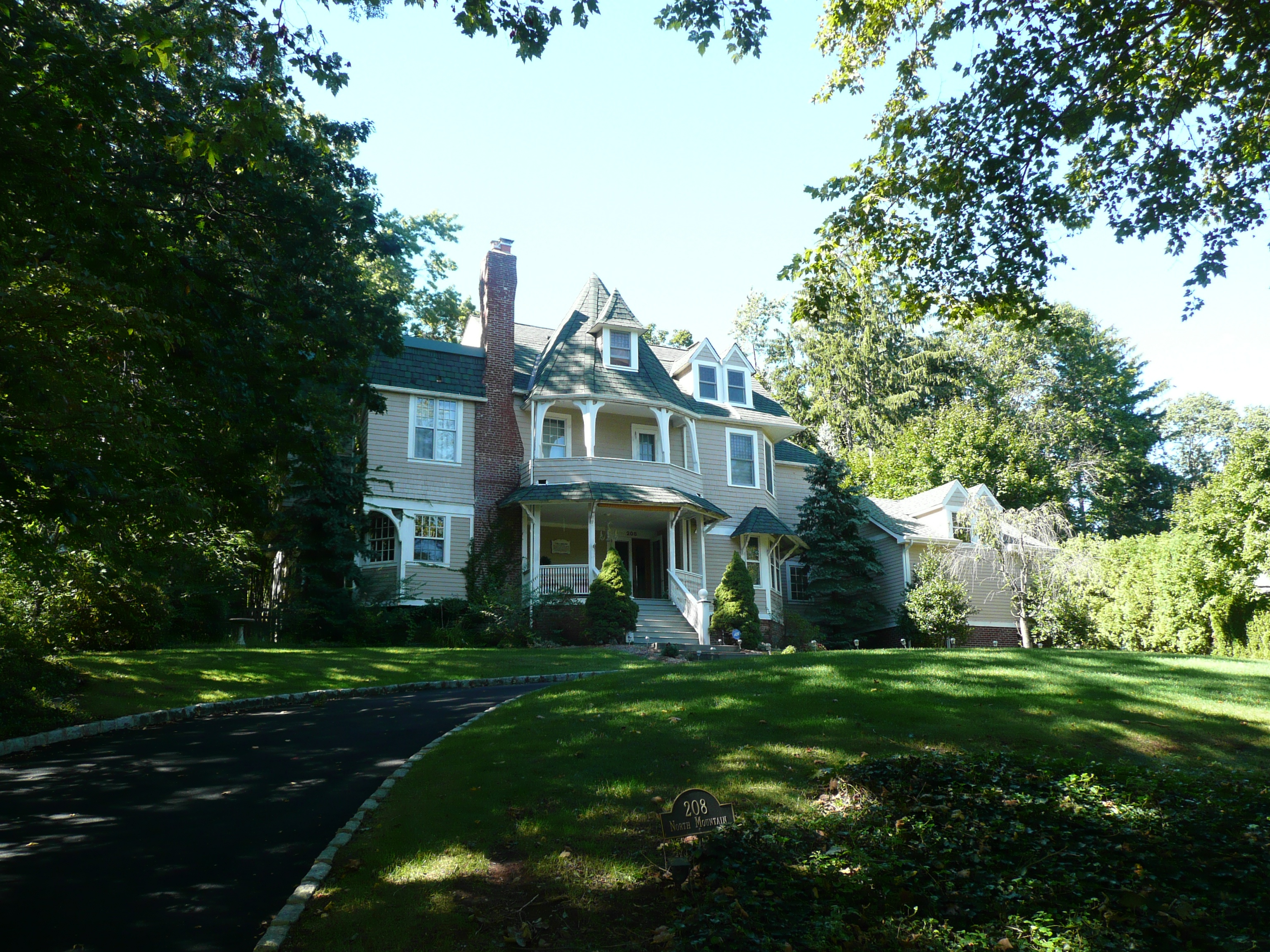
The home of Harry Fenn in Montclair, New Jersey, designed by H. Edwards Ficken in 1884.

H. Edwards Ficken (1852-1929) was an English American architect in practice in New York City.

== Early life and career ==
Henry Edwards Ficken was born May 25, 1852, in London. He was educated privately at home and at the Greenock Academy in Scotland.

Ficken came to the United States in 1869 and worked variously for the firms of Renwick & Sands, Potter & Robertson, and McKim, Mead & Bigelow. In 1878, he formed a partnership with Charles H. Smith as Ficken & Smith, though their association was brief. By the following year, he was instead in partnership with Charles D. Gambrill. In October 1878, Gambrill had dissolved his former partnership with Henry Hobson Richardson, with whom he had been associated with since 1867. Gambrill & Ficken existed only very briefly, as Gambrill died in 1880 in what was presumed to be a suicide.

Aside from a brief association with Edward H. Clark, initiated in 1885, Ficken maintained a private practice until 1913, when he was appointed supervising architect of Woodlawn Cemetery, a position he held until his death in 1929.

Ficken joined the American Institute of Architects in 1881, and was made a Fellow in 1882.

== Personal life ==
Ficken was an amateur athlete and a member of the New York Athletic Club. In 1876, he was national champion in the high jump and, in 1877 and 1878, he was champion in the high jump as well as the 120 yards hurdles, though he later retired from competition. In 1883, he was chosen architect of the club's new building, though his design was eventually rejected due to cost. After construction began on a more expensive building designed by Charles W. Clinton, Ficken sued for and was awarded his full professional fee.

Ficken married twice. He married his first wife Josephine Hubbard in 1880. She died in 1886 soon after giving birth to twin daughters, Margery and Dorothy. In 1889, he married Mary Beck Goddard, as her second husband. Dorothy married Frederick W. Gwynne and had three children. One of them, Fred Gwynne, would become a noted actor.

Ficken served fifteen years in the New York National Guard, and during World War I, he served in the Office of the Inspector General.

Ficken died January 26, 1929, at home in New York City.

== Architectural works ==
At least six of Ficken's works have been individually listed on the United States National Register of Historic Places, two of which are also National Historic Landmarks:

- Park Avenue Baptist Church, (Note: Credited to Ficken & Smith.) Plainfield, New Jersey (1878, demolished)
- Muhlenberg Hospital, Plainfield, New Jersey (1879, demolished)
- Iron Pier, (Note: Credited to Gambrill & Ficken.) Coney Island, Brooklyn, New York (1879, burned 1911)
- House and stable for Christopher Rhinelander Robert II, (Note: Remodeling of an 1831-built house and a new attached stable at 16 Washington Mews. Listed on the National Register of Historic Places in 1979 as part of the Greenwich Village Historic District.) New York, New York (1880)
- Hoboken Land and Improvement Company shops, Hoboken, New Jersey (1881, demolished)
- Hoboken Terminal (former), Hoboken, New Jersey (1883, burned 1905)
- "The Cedars" for Harry Fenn, Montclair, New Jersey (1884, NRHP 1988)
- Interiors at "Grey Towers" for James Wallace Pinchot, (Note: Although Richard Morris Hunt was the architect of the house begun in 1885, Pinchot hired Ficken to design interiors and alterations while Hunt was abroad.) Milford, Pennsylvania (1886, NHL 1963, NRHP 1966)
- "The Cloister" for the Book and Snake, (Note: Now owned by Yale University and known as Warner House.) New Haven, Connecticut (1887)
- House for Frances A. Johnson, (Note: A contributing property to the Upper West Side-Central Park West Historic District, NYCL-listed in 1990.) New York, New York (1887)
- "Pepperidge Hall" for Christopher Rhinelander Robert II, Oakdale, New York (1889, demolished 1941)
- Sterling Opera House, (Note: A contributing property to the Birmingham Green Historic District, NRHP-listed in 2000.) Derby, Connecticut (1889, NRHP 1968)
- House for Frances deLancey Welsh, (Note: Incorporated the structure of an 1855-built residence already on site.) Philadelphia, Pennsylvania (1893–94, NRHP 1980)
- House for Robert D. Sheppard, (Note: Built for a trustee of Northwestern University, but best known as the residence of Charles Gates Dawes, under whose name the house was listed on the National Register of Historic Places in 1976.) Evanston, Illinois (1894, NHL and NRHP 1976)
- Edward Ferguson Memorial of St. Luke's Chapel, Stamford, Connecticut (1898, NRHP 1987)
- 147 Fifth Avenue building, (Note: A contributing property to the Ladies' Mile Historic District, NYCL-listed in 1989.) New York, New York (1899)
- Ridgefield School for Boys, Ridgefield, Connecticut (1911, demolished)

== Gallery of architectural works ==
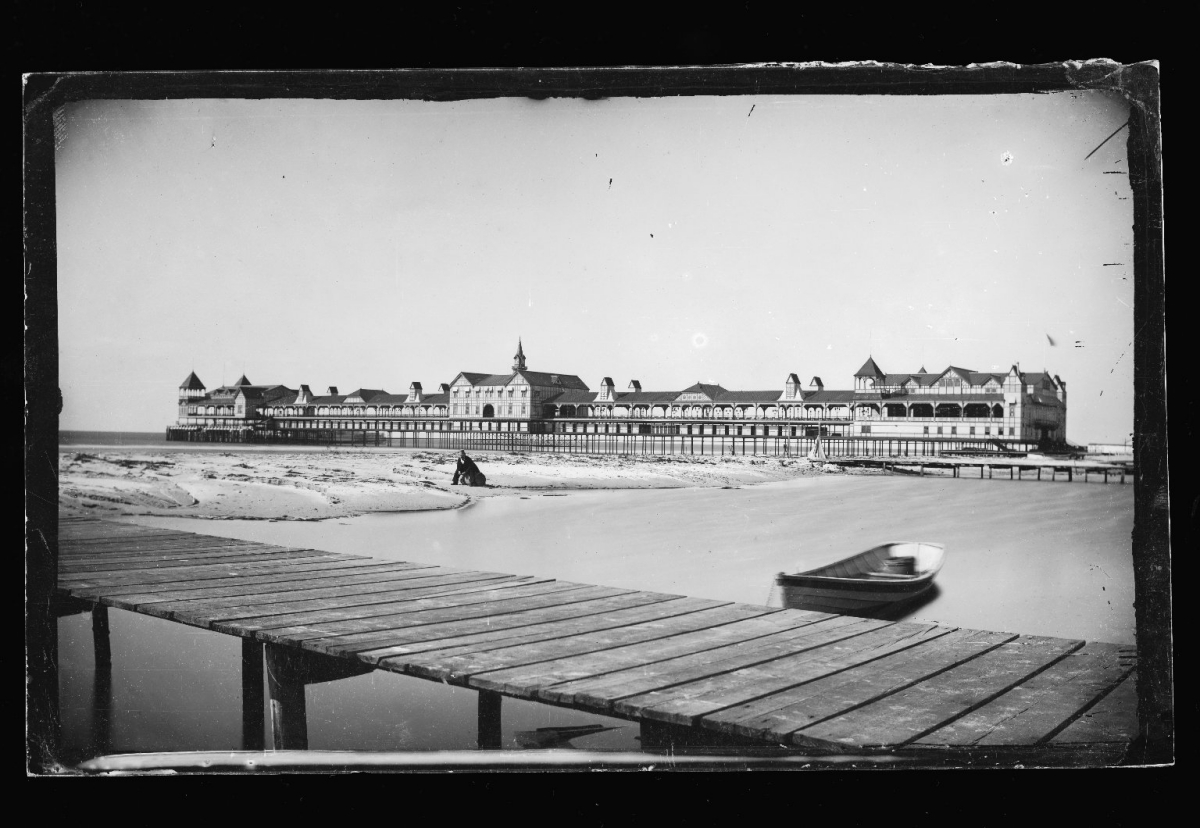
Iron Pier, Coney Island, Brooklyn, New York, 1879.

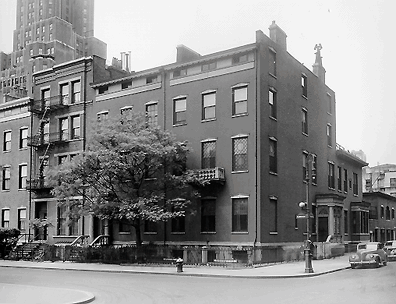
House and stable for Christopher Rhinelander Robert II, New York, New York, 1880.

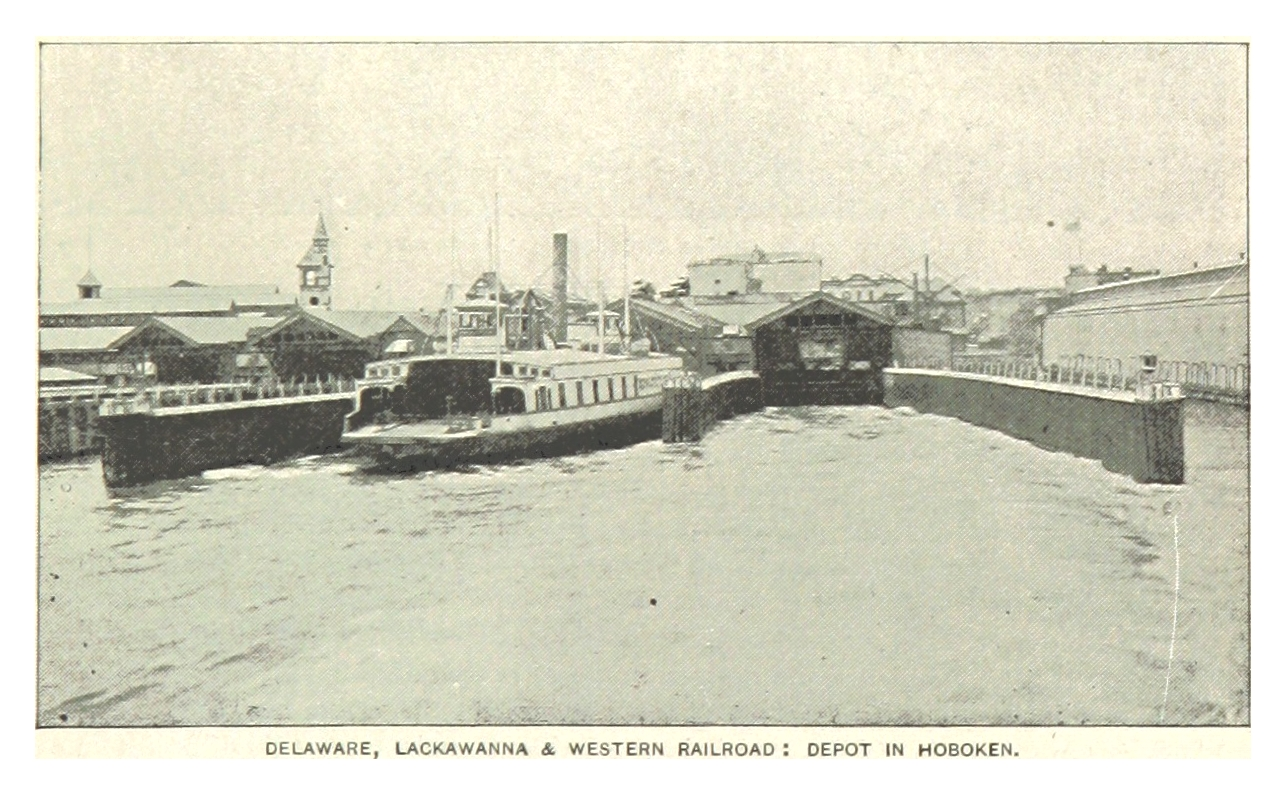
Hoboken Terminal, Hoboken, New Jersey, 1883.

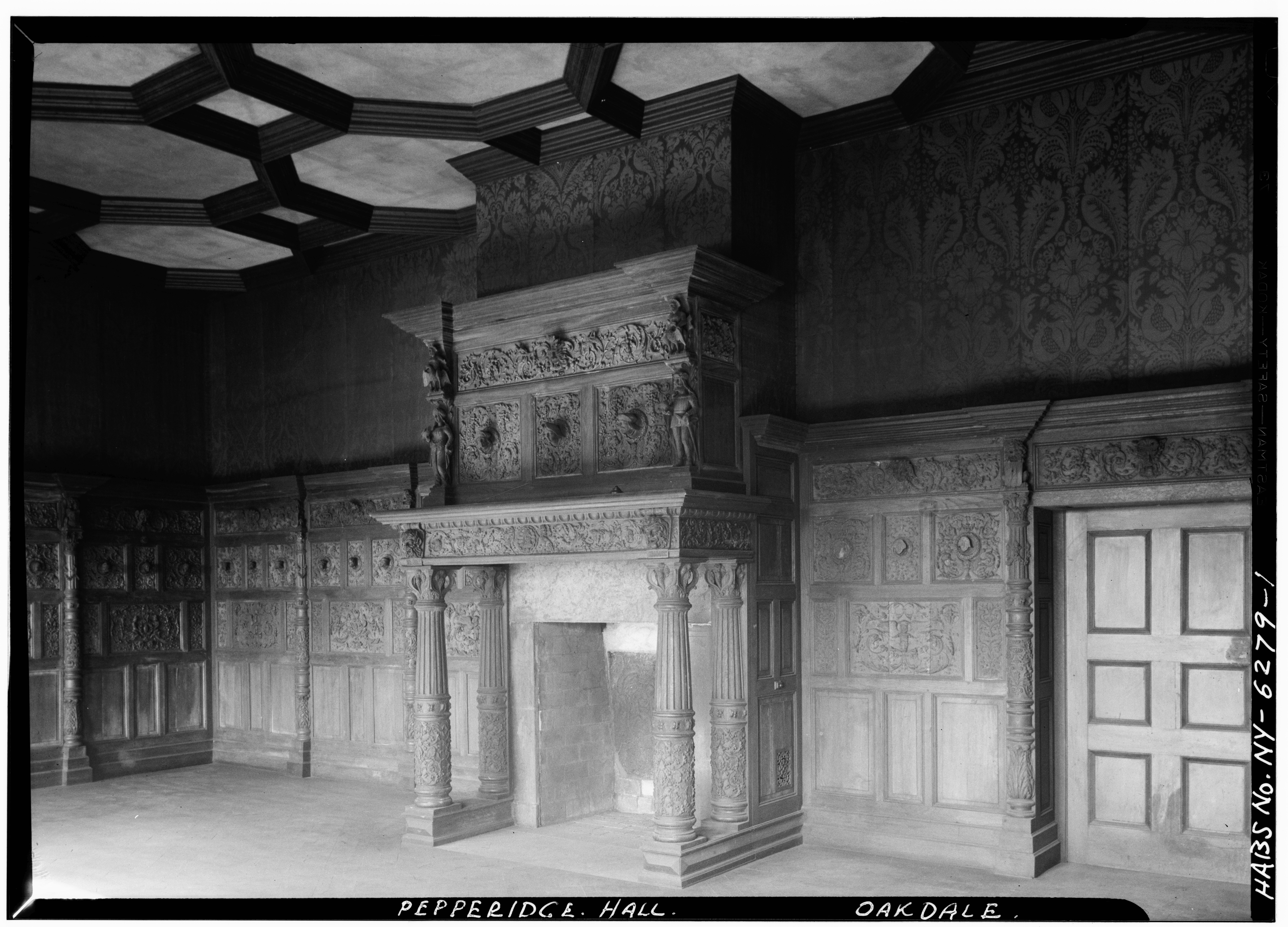
Interior of Pepperidge Hall, Oakdale, New York, 1889.

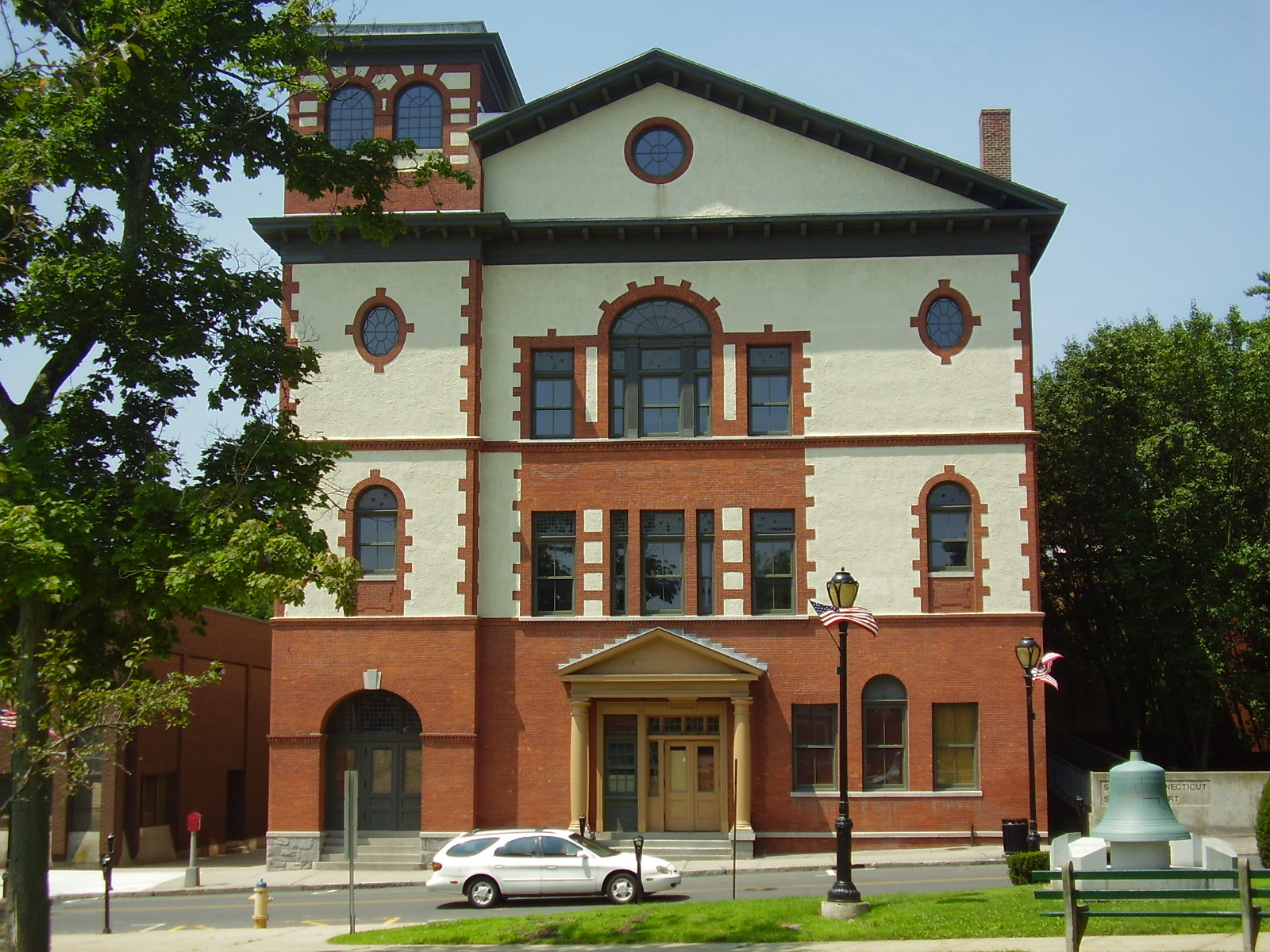
Sterling Opera House, Derby, Connecticut, 1889.

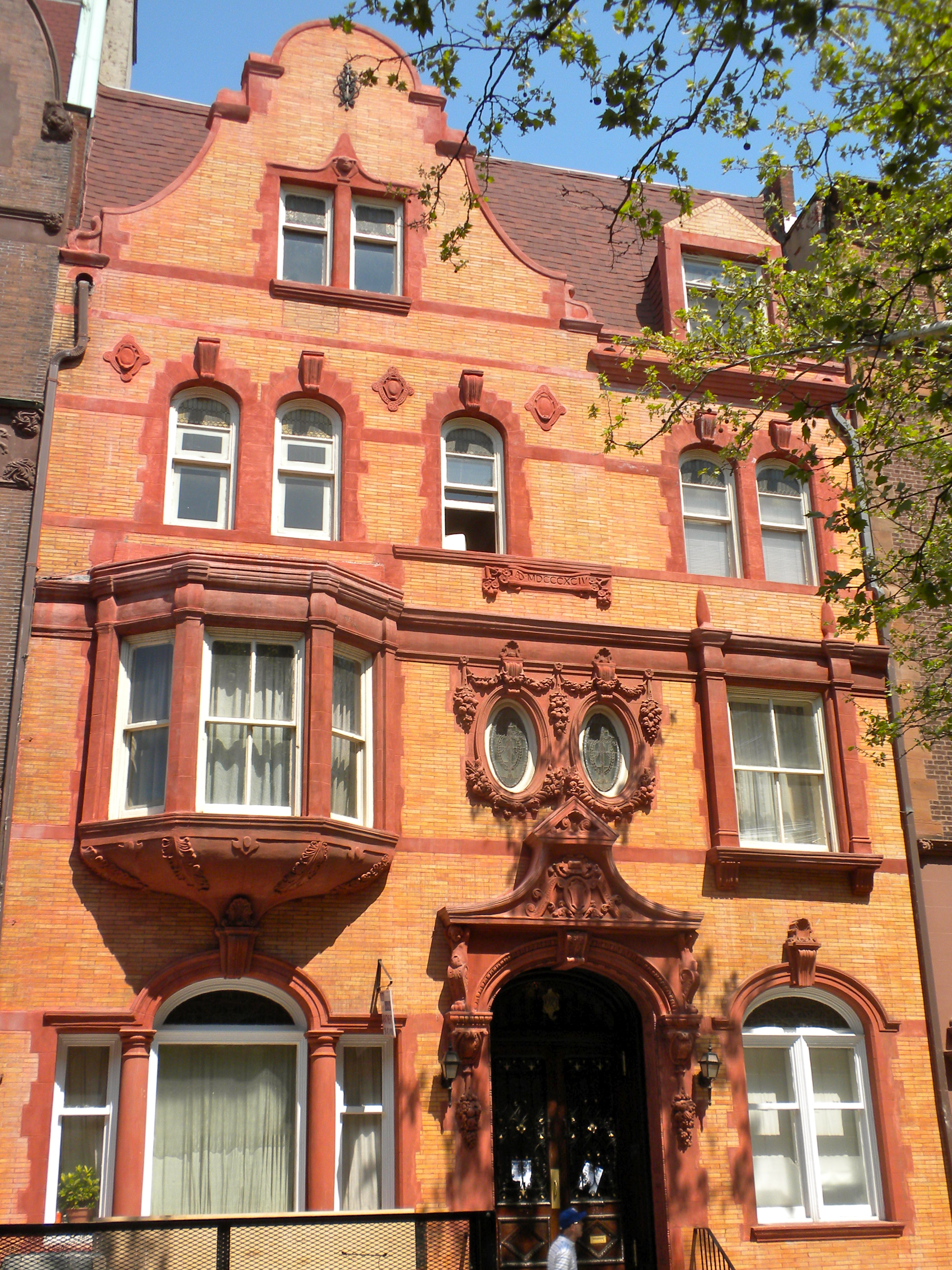
House for Frances deLancey Welsh, Philadelphia, Pennsylvania, 1893.

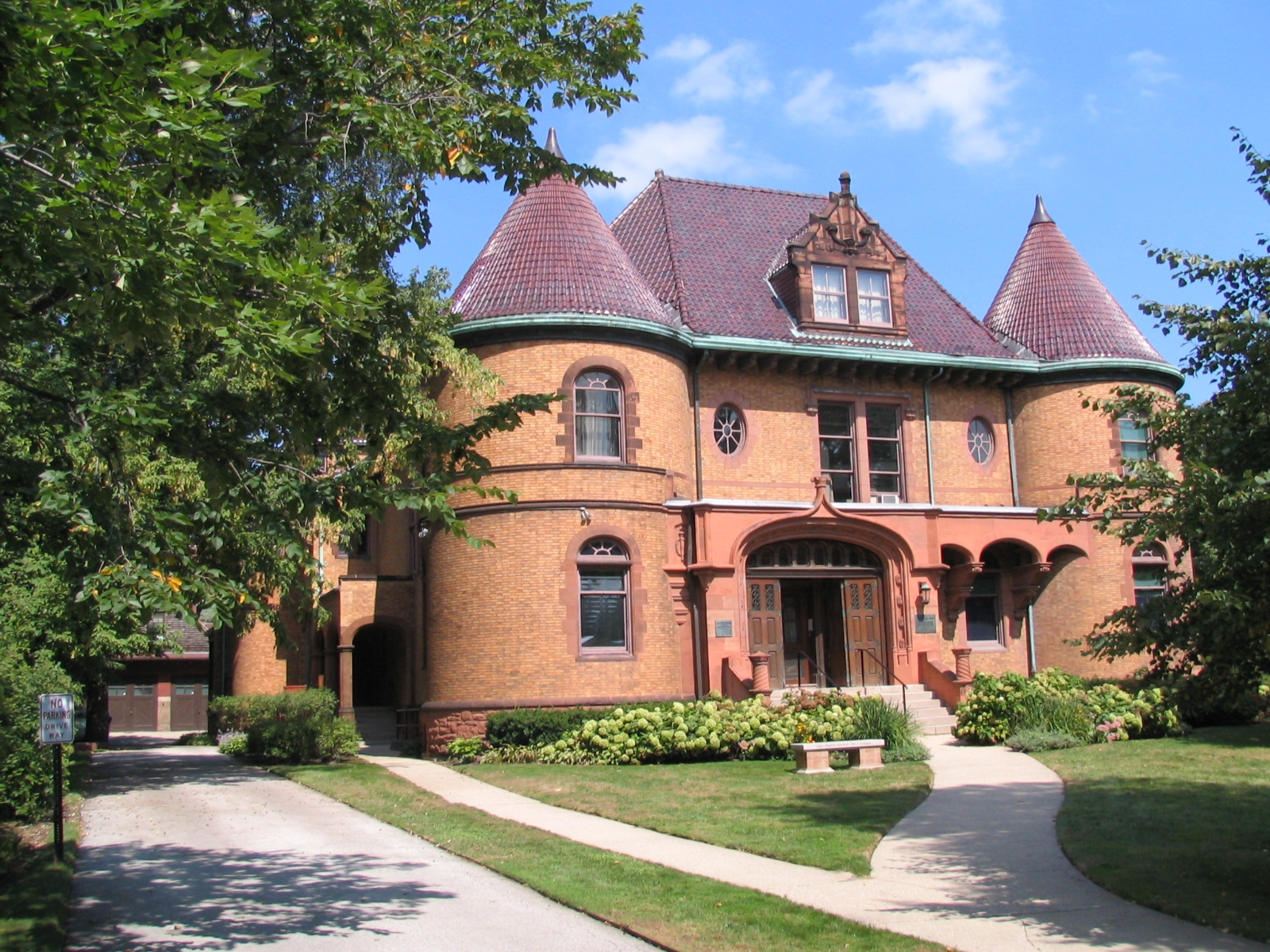
House for Robert D. Sheppard, Evanston, Illinois, 1894.

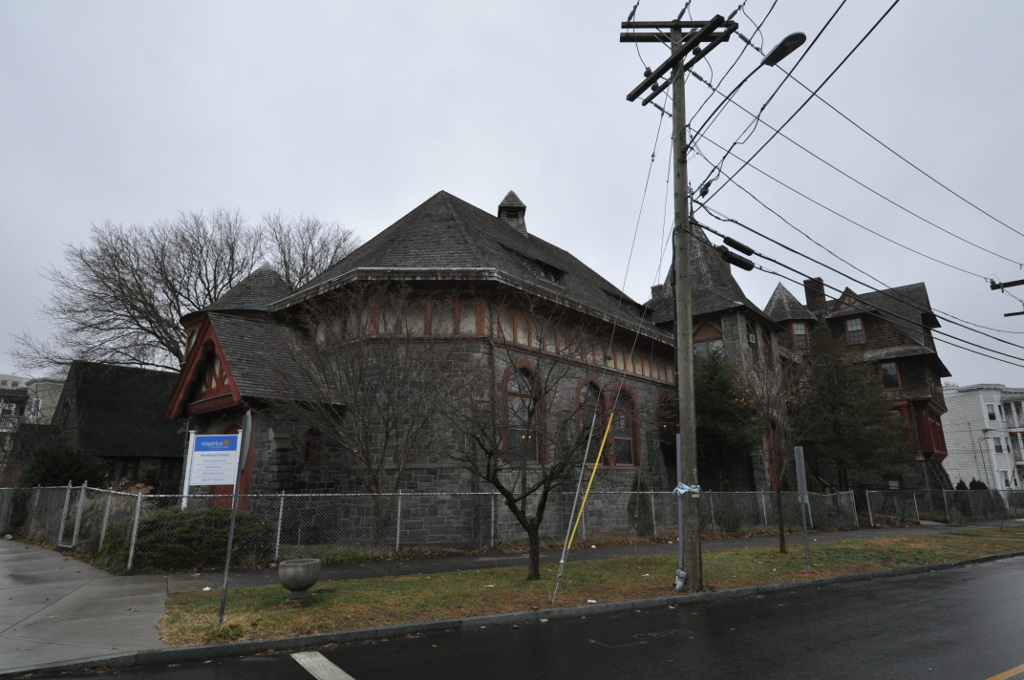
Edward Ferguson Memorial of St. Luke's Chapel, Stamford, Connecticut, 1898.
