= Charles G. Dawes House =

Historic house in Illinois, United States

- U.S. National Register of Historic Places
- U.S. National Historic Landmark
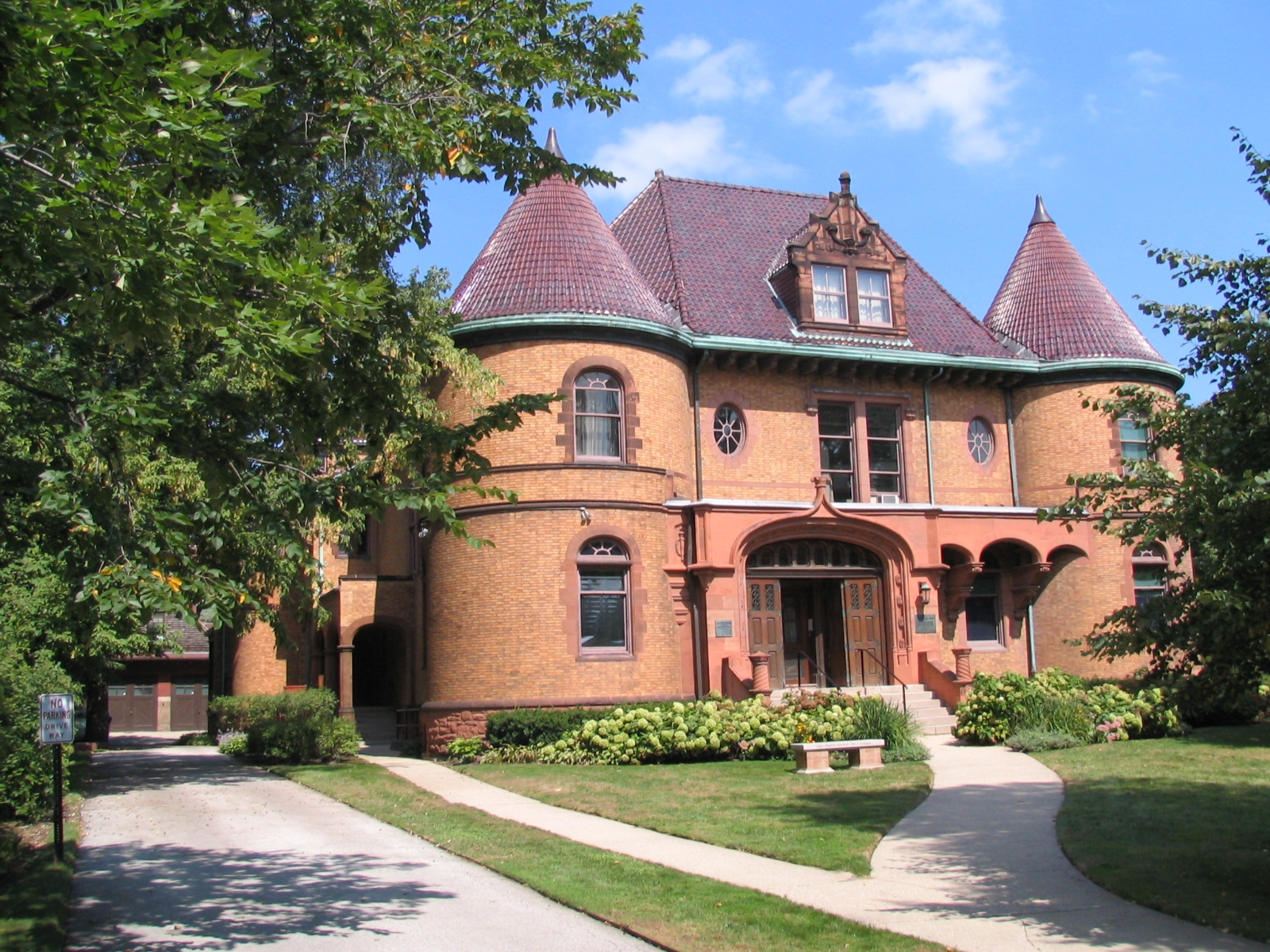
- The main (south) facade, facing Greenwood St.

- Location within Illinois Location within the United States
- Interactive map showing the location of Charles G. Dawes House
- Location: 225 Greenwood Street, Evanston, Illinois
- Coordinates: 42°2′34.92″N 87°40′25.18″W
- Built: 1894
- Architect: H. Edwards Ficken
- Architectural style: Chateauesque
- NRHP reference No.: 76000706

Significant dates
- Added to NRHP: December 8, 1976
- Designated NHL: December 8, 1976

The Charles Gates Dawes House is a historic house museum at 225 Greenwood Street in Evanston, Illinois. Built in 1894, this Chateauesque lakefront mansion was from 1909 until his death the home of Charles Gates Dawes (1865–1951) and his family. Dawes earned the 1925 Nobel Peace Prize for his plan to alleviate the crushing burden of war reparations Germany was required to pay after World War I. Dawes served as U.S. Vice President under Calvin Coolidge, a general during World War I, and as United States Ambassador to Great Britain. Dawes was a descendant of William Dawes, who along with Paul Revere, rode to alarm the colonists that the British regulars were coming on the night before the Revolutionary War began. The house, a National Historic Landmark, is now owned by the Evanston History Center (formerly known as the Evanston Historical Society), which offers tours.

== History ==
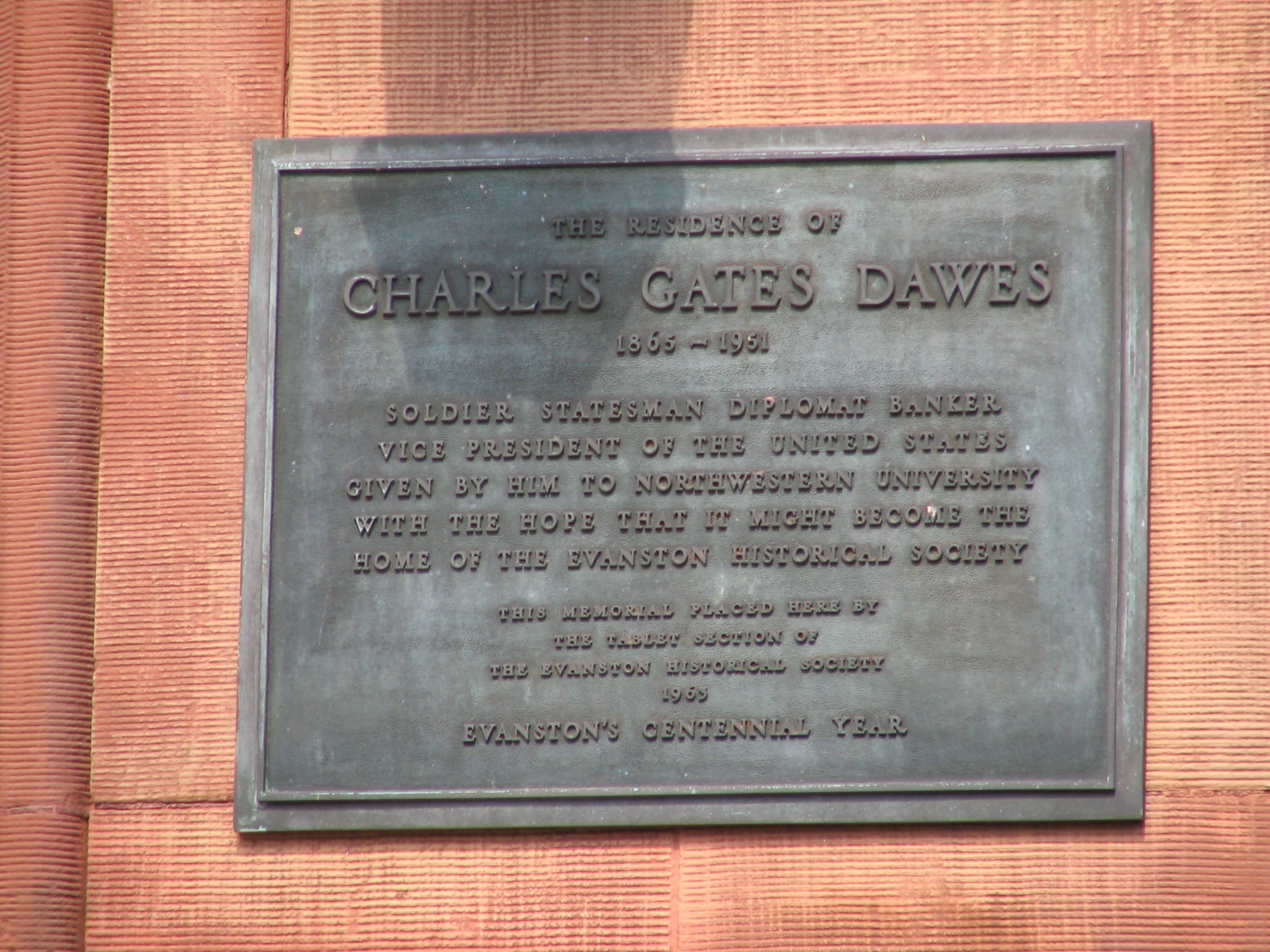
Memorial plaque to the right of the front door

Charles G. Dawes and family lived here from 1909 to 1951. He donated the house to Northwestern University in 1944 with the understanding that it be used as the home of the Evanston Historical Society, now known as the Evanston History Center. The Dawes family continued to occupy it until Mrs. Caro Blymer Dawes' death in 1957, and it became home to the Historical Society in 1960. In 2009, Northwestern University donated the house to the Evanston History Center.

== Architecture ==
The house was built in 1894 for Robert Sheppard, treasurer and business manager of Northwestern University, and designed by H. Edwards Ficken (1844–1929) of New York.

The house is considered to be an example of the Chateauesque style of architecture, but in many respects it is not typical. The style was introduced to the United States in 1882 by Richard Morris Hunt when he built a palace in the style at 660 Fifth Avenue in New York for Alva and William Kissam Vanderbilt (demolished, 1926). Architects of the time usually built chateauesque designs clad in limestone and decorated with elaborate Renaissance carving. Perhaps the best example of this style remaining in Chicago is the house at 1801 S. Prairie Ave.

The detailing of the Dawes house represents more the flavor of rural French architecture, and in this respect has more in common with the rustic character of Grey Towers, the Pennsylvania home of Gifford Pinchot designed largely by Hunt in 1886, but in which Ficken had a hand in some of the details. Even a quick study of the Dawes house, Grey Towers, and the more formally detailed John A. McGill house (1892) in Chicago (see picture) shows how closely they are all related to each other and to French antecedents, especially to the Château de Chambord at Chambord, Loir-et-Cher in France.

== Gallery ==
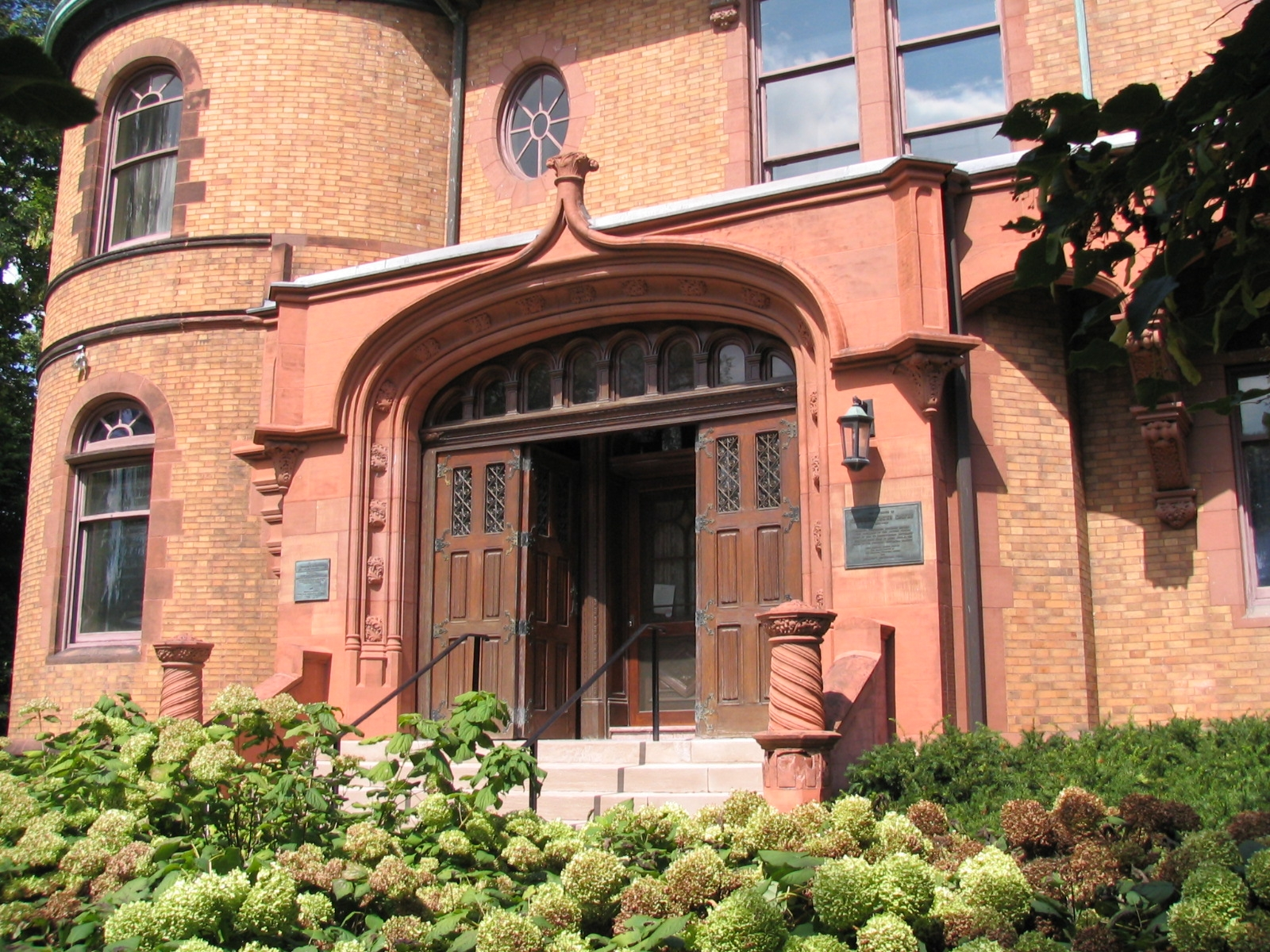
Detail of the front door

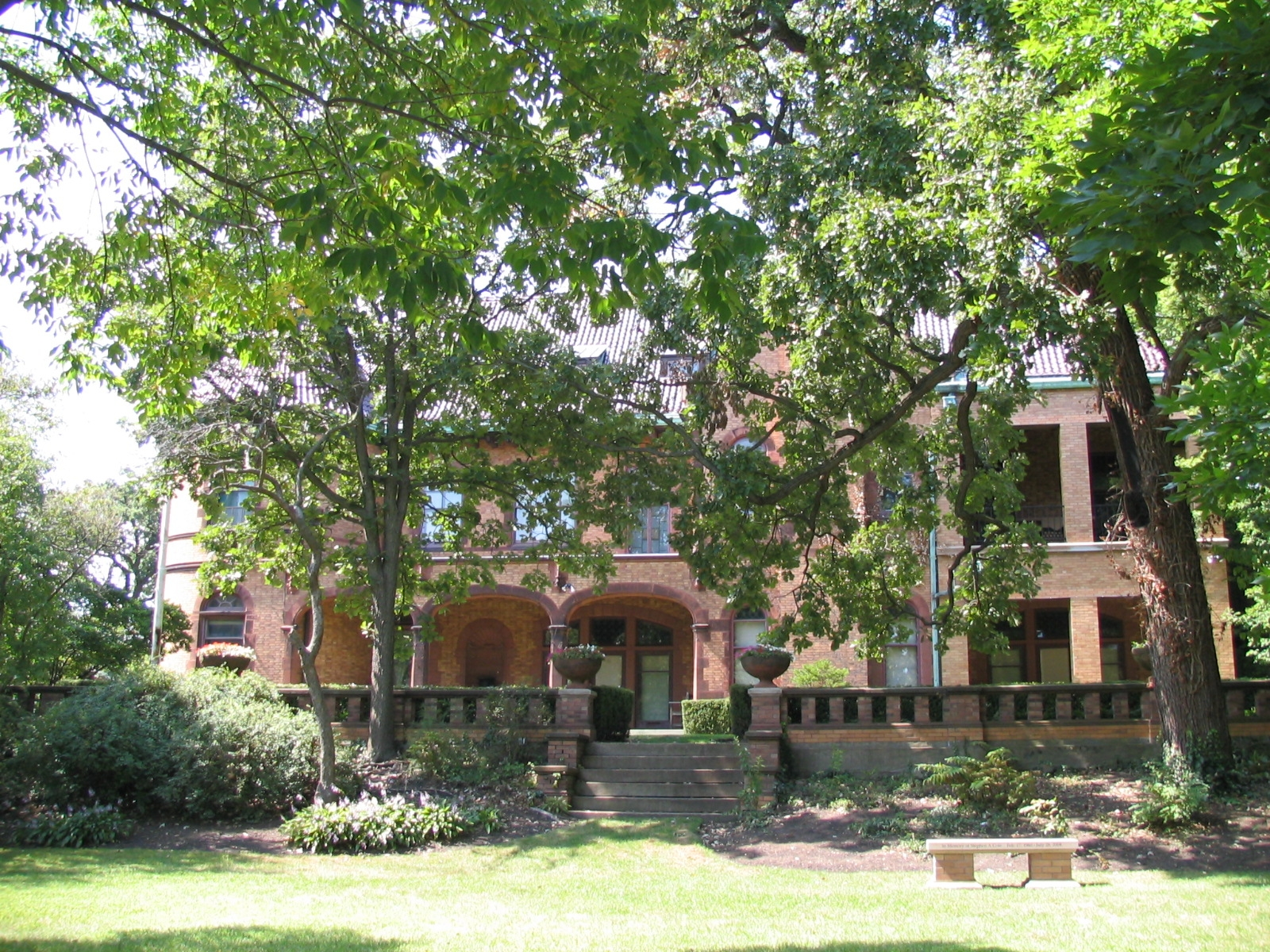
View of the house from the side yard that overlooks Lake Michigan

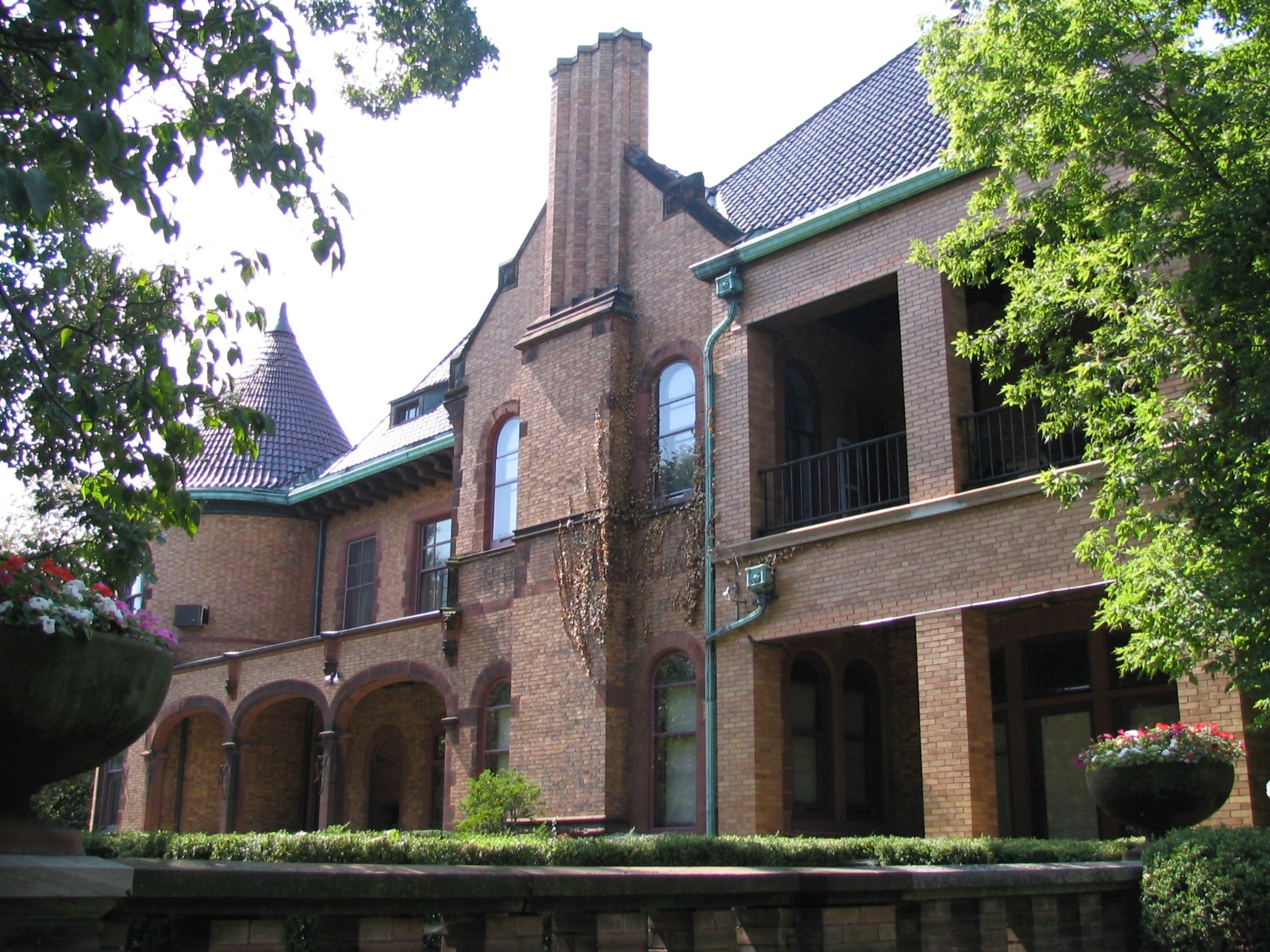
View of the terrace that overlooks Lake Michigan

== Landmark status ==
The house was declared a National Historic Landmark in 1976.

== Evanston History Center ==
The Evanston History Center (EHC), formerly the Evanston Historical Society, maintains its headquarters at the Charles Gates Dawes House. The house is open to the public by docent-led tours, featuring a walk through the library, dining room, kitchen, and great hall which are decorated with period furnishings and artwork once belonging to the Dawes family. The EHC also runs public events, workshops, lectures, and a research room containing documents, books, photographs, maps and other historical archival material related to Evanston history.www.evanstonhistorycenter.org

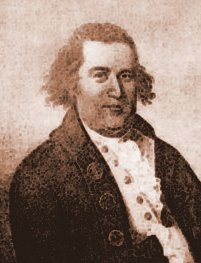
William Dawes. The original oil painting is in the collection of the Evanston History Center, Evanston, IL.

== See also ==
- List of National Historic Landmarks in Illinois
- National Register of Historic Places listings in Cook County, Illinois
