= Rafsnyder-Welsh House =

Historic house in Pennsylvania, United States

- U.S. National Register of Historic Places
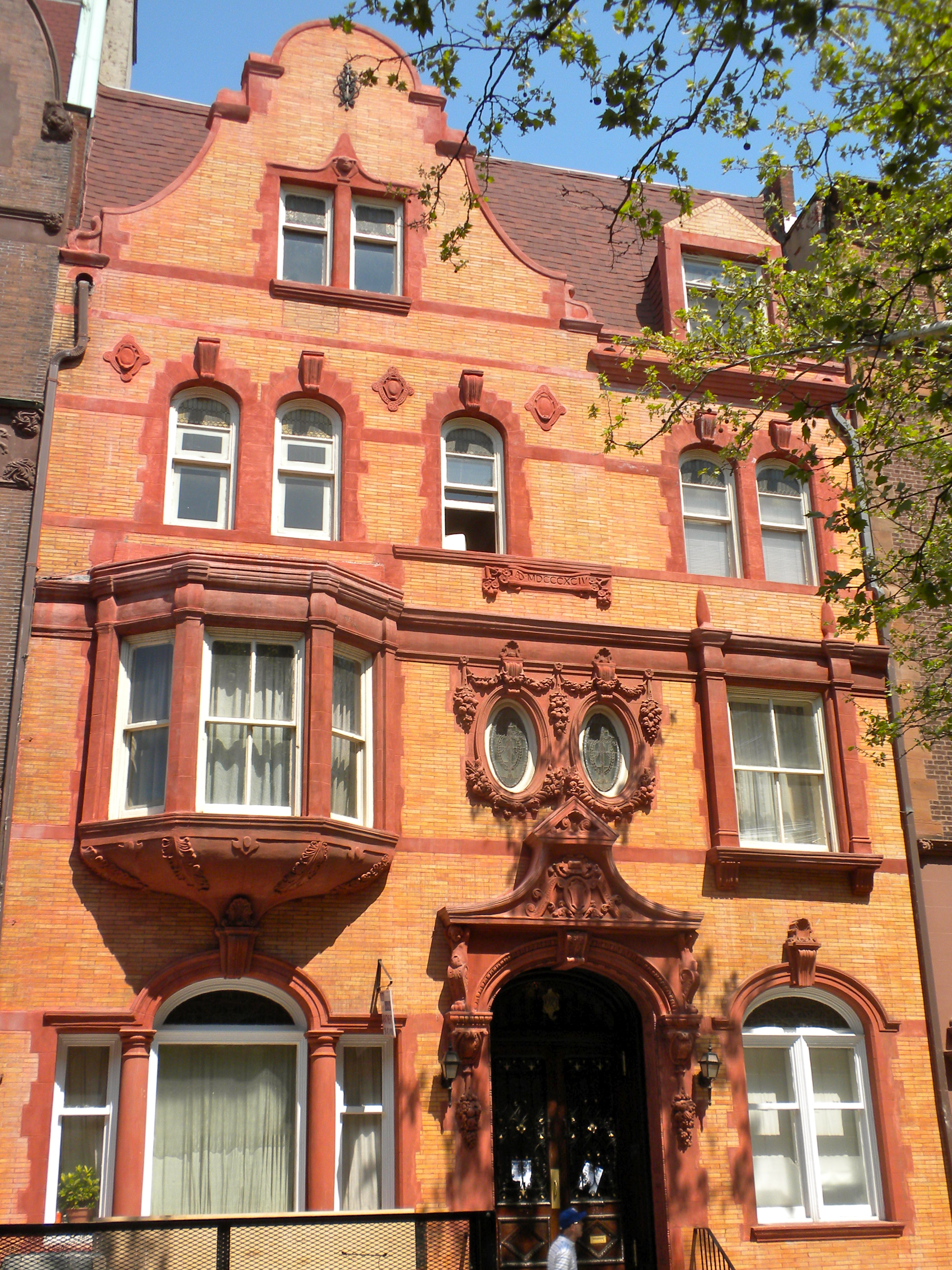
- Rafsnyder-Welsh House, April 2010

- Location within Philadelphia Location within Pennsylvania Location within the United States
- Location: 1923 Spruce Street, Philadelphia, Pennsylvania
- Coordinates: 39°56′53″N 75°10′27″W
- Area: 0.1 acres (0.040 ha)
- Built: c. 1855, 1893–1894
- Built by: Edwin Rafsnyder
- Architect: H. Edwards Ficken (1893-94)
- Architectural style: Picturesque Eclectic
- NRHP reference No.: 80003618
- Added to NRHP: February 14, 1980

The Rafsnyder-Welsh House is an historic home that is located in the Rittenhouse Square East neighborhood of Philadelphia, Pennsylvania, United States.

The house was added to the National Register of Historic Places in 1980.

== History and architectural features ==
The original house was built circa 1855, as a typical brick Philadelphia rowhouse consisting of a front building, piazza, and back building. It was extensively remodeled and enlarged to its present form between 1893 and 1894.

As presently formed, it consists of a four-story front building that is approximately thirty-four feet wide and thirty-six feet deep. It is connected to a four-story back building, by a four-story section. Attached to the back building is a three-story, brick wing and two-story wing. A four-story fire tower was added in 1922. It has an eclectic front facade of Pompeiian brick with sandstone and terra cotta trim.
