= Charles D. Gambrill =

American architect (1834–1880)

- Born: January 19, 1834; Roxbury, Massachusetts
- Died: September 13, 1880 (aged 46); New York City
- Occupation: Architect
- Practice: Gambrill & Post; Gambrill & Richardson; Gambrill & Ficken

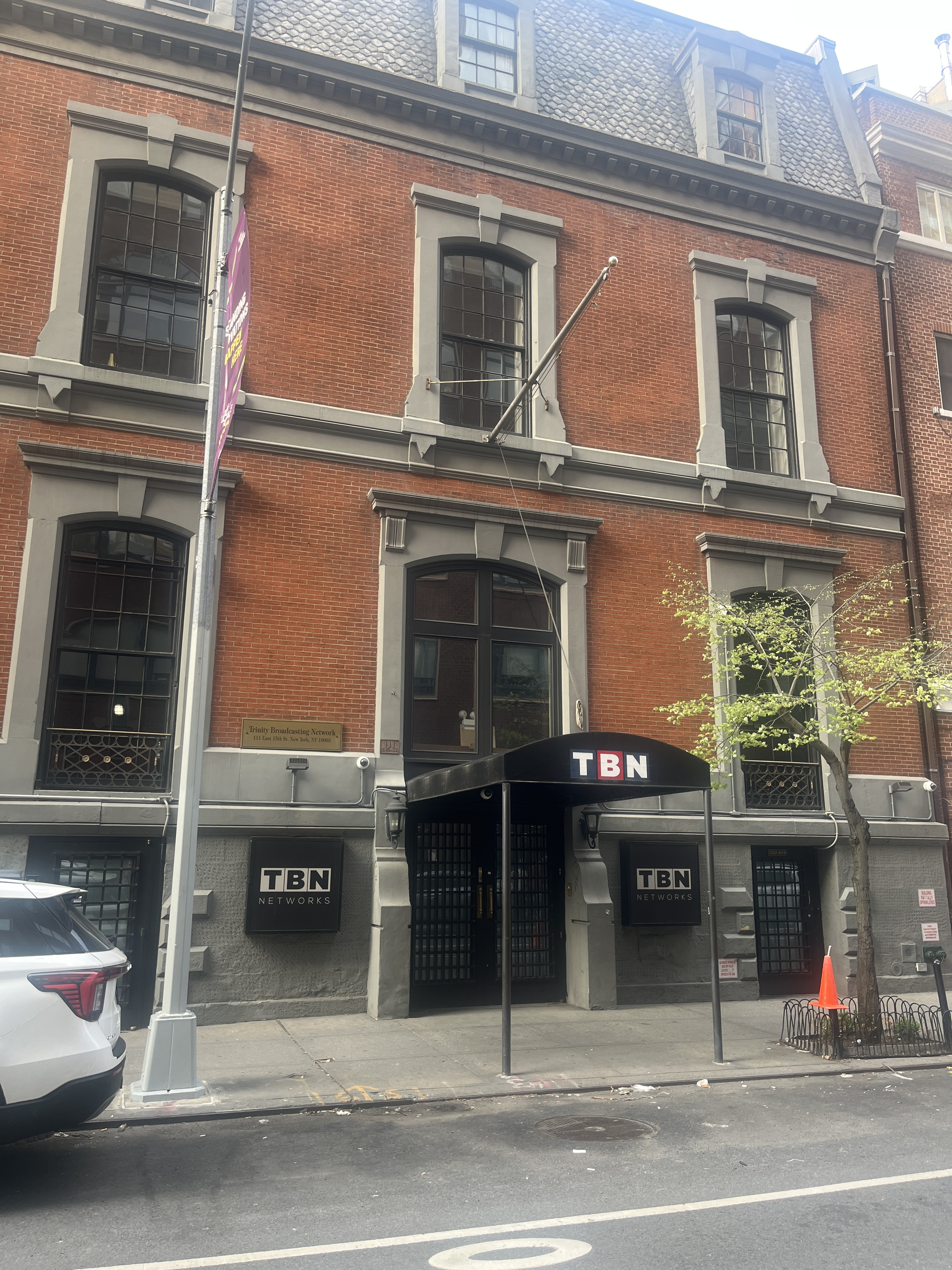
The former Century Association building in New York City, remodeled by Gambrill in 1867 and 1869.

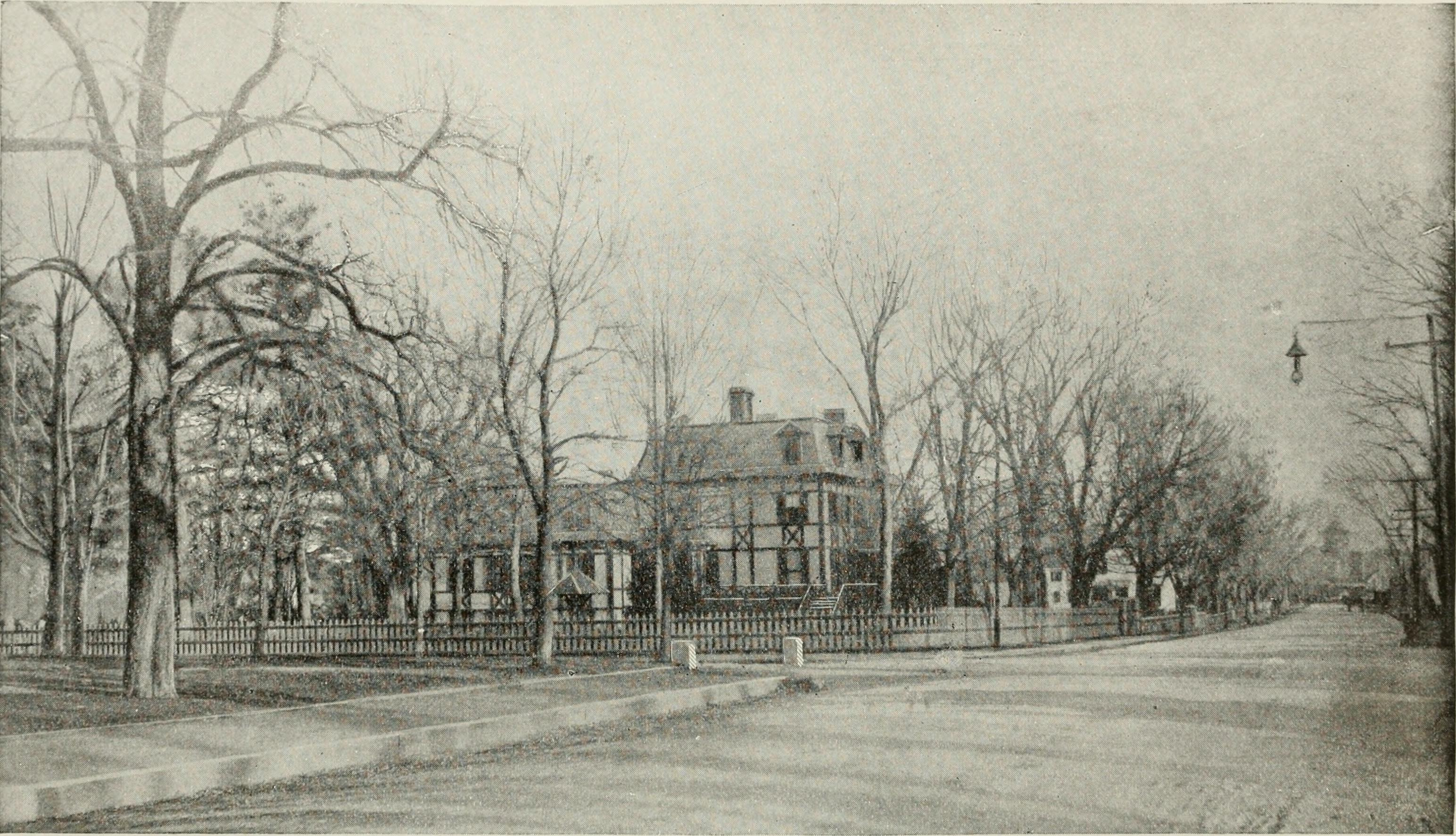
The house of Edward Stimson in Dedham, Massachusetts, designed by Gambrill in 1868.

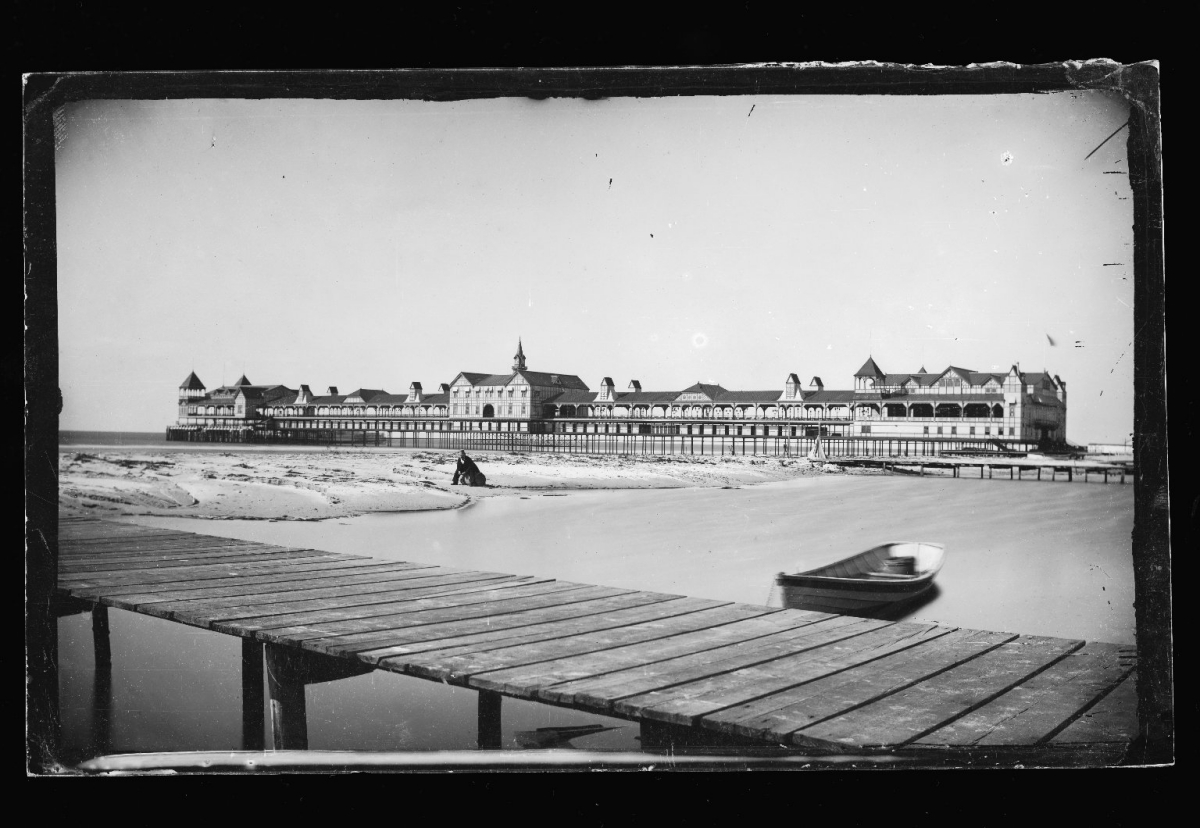
Iron Pier at Coney Island, completed in 1879.

Charles D. Gambrill FAIA (1834–1880) was an American architect in practice in New York City from 1860 until his death in 1880.

== Life and career ==
Charles Dexter Gambrill was born January 19, 1834, in Roxbury, Massachusetts, now part of Boston. He was educated at Harvard College, graduating in 1854. After a term at the Lawrence Scientific School, in 1855 he joined the studio of George Snell, an English-born architect known as a mentor to young architects. In Snell's studio Gambrill worked alongside several others, including his former classmate Henry Van Brunt. In 1857 Gambrill and Van Brunt left Boston for New York City, where they joined the atelier of Richard Morris Hunt, the first American architect to attend the Beaux-Arts de Paris. In 1858 Gambrill was admitted to the American Institute of Architects. In 1860 he and another of Hunt's students, George B. Post, left to open their own office. Gambrill and Post worked together until 1867, with the exception of the eight months Post spent serving in the American Civil War. In October of the same year Gambrill formed a new partnership with Henry Hobson Richardson, also a Harvard graduate and the second American architect to study in Paris. Gambrill's role in the partnership has been described as "business manager," though several of the partnership's works are credited to him. Their partnership lasted until 1878, though for the last four years Gambrill was alone in the New York office, Richardson having moved to Brookline, Massachusetts, in 1874. In 1878 Gambrill formed the last of his three partnerships, this time with H. Edwards Ficken, an English-born architect, which lasted until his death.

== Personal life and death ==
Gambrill was married, but had no children. As a member and Fellow of the American Institute of Architects, he served four terms as secretary. He also held several leadership roles within the Century Association.

Gambrill committed suicide with a revolver on September 13, 1880, in his New York City office. Though not in debt, Gambrill had suffered personal financial losses and had been in poor physical and mental health for some time, having threatened suicide in the past.

== Architectural works ==
- New Church addition, 114 E 35th St, New York City (1866)
- Century Association remodeling, 111 E 15th St, New York City (1867 and 1869, NYCL 1993)
- Edward Stimson house, (Note: Stimson extensively rebuilt the home of politician Fisher Ames, built in 1795. After Stimson's death the house was moved from High Street to near the Charles River by his son, Frederic Jesup Stimson.) 10 Old River Pl, Dedham, Massachusetts (1868, demolished)
- Jonathan Sturges house, 38 Park Ave, New York City (1869, demolished 1954)
- James H. Tinkham house, (Note: A contributing property to the Owego Central Historic District, NRHP-listed in 1980 and expanded in 1998.) 60 Front St, Owego, New York (1874)
- Iron Pier, Coney Island, Brooklyn (1878–79, demolished)
