= Pinchot Institute for Conservation =

Non-profit organization in the USA

The Pinchot Institute for Conservation is a conservation organization based in Washington, DC. It is named after Gifford Pinchot, the founding Chief of the United States Forest Service and two-time Pennsylvania Governor. The Pinchot Institute for Conservation works for sustainable environment, clean water, clean air and healthy habitat through conservation thought, policy and action.

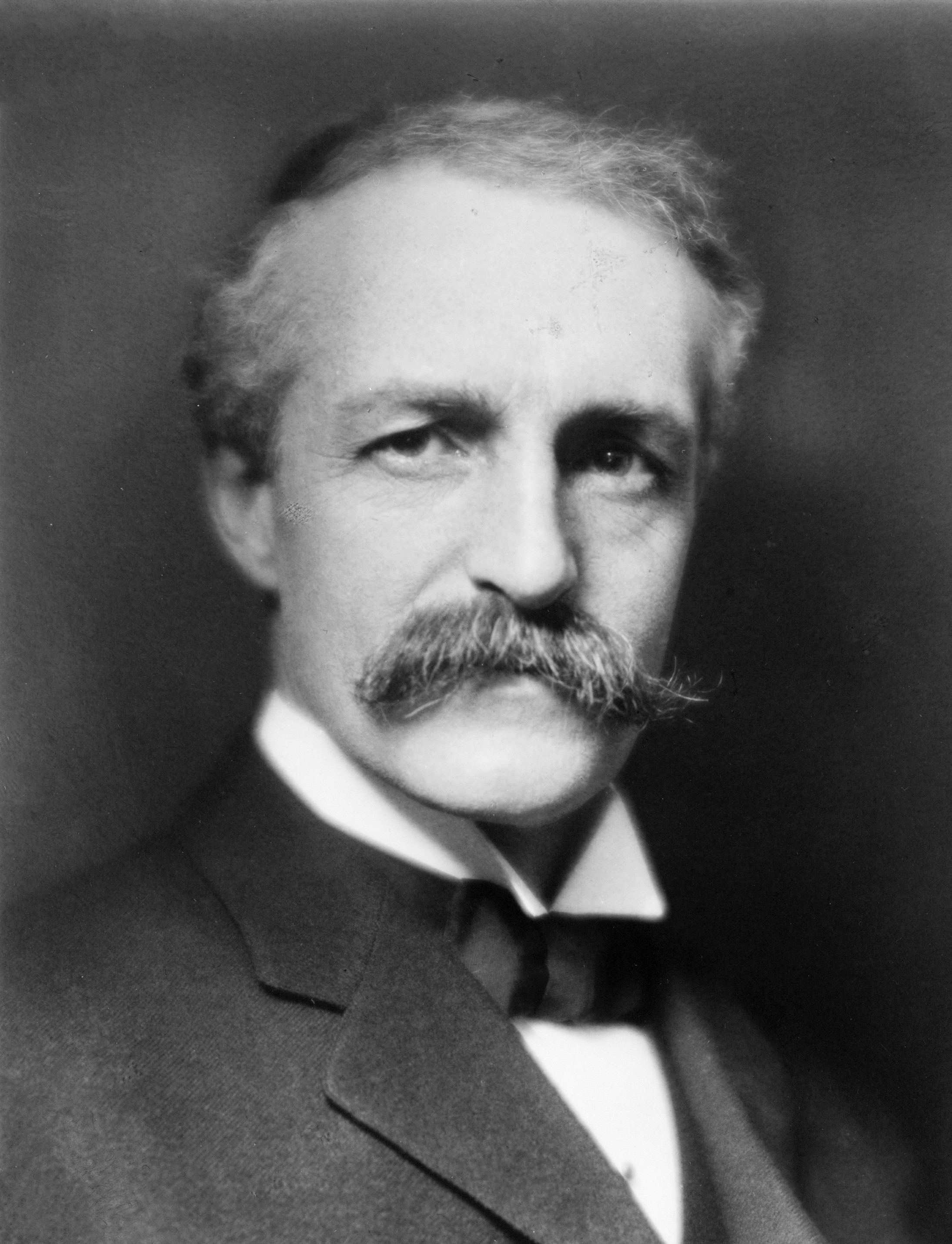
Gifford Pinchot, 1909, by Pirie MacDonald, when Pinchot was the first Chief of the United States Forest Service.

As Gifford Pinchot wrote in his book, Breaking New Ground, "Conservation is the foresighted utilization, preservation and/or renewal of forests, waters, lands and minerals for the greatest good of the greatest number for the longest time."

== Mission ==
The mission of the Pinchot Institute is to contribute to the conservation and sustainability of natural resource management through thought, policy and action. Through their policy initiatives, the Pinchot Institute seeks to solve conservation challenges through nonpartisan education and research. Areas of focus include climate and energy, water, forests, community forestry and policy.

The Pinchot Institute follows Gifford Pinchot's belief that "World-wide practice of conservation and the fair and continued access by all nations to the resources they need are the two indispensable foundations of continuous plenty and of permanent peace."

== History ==
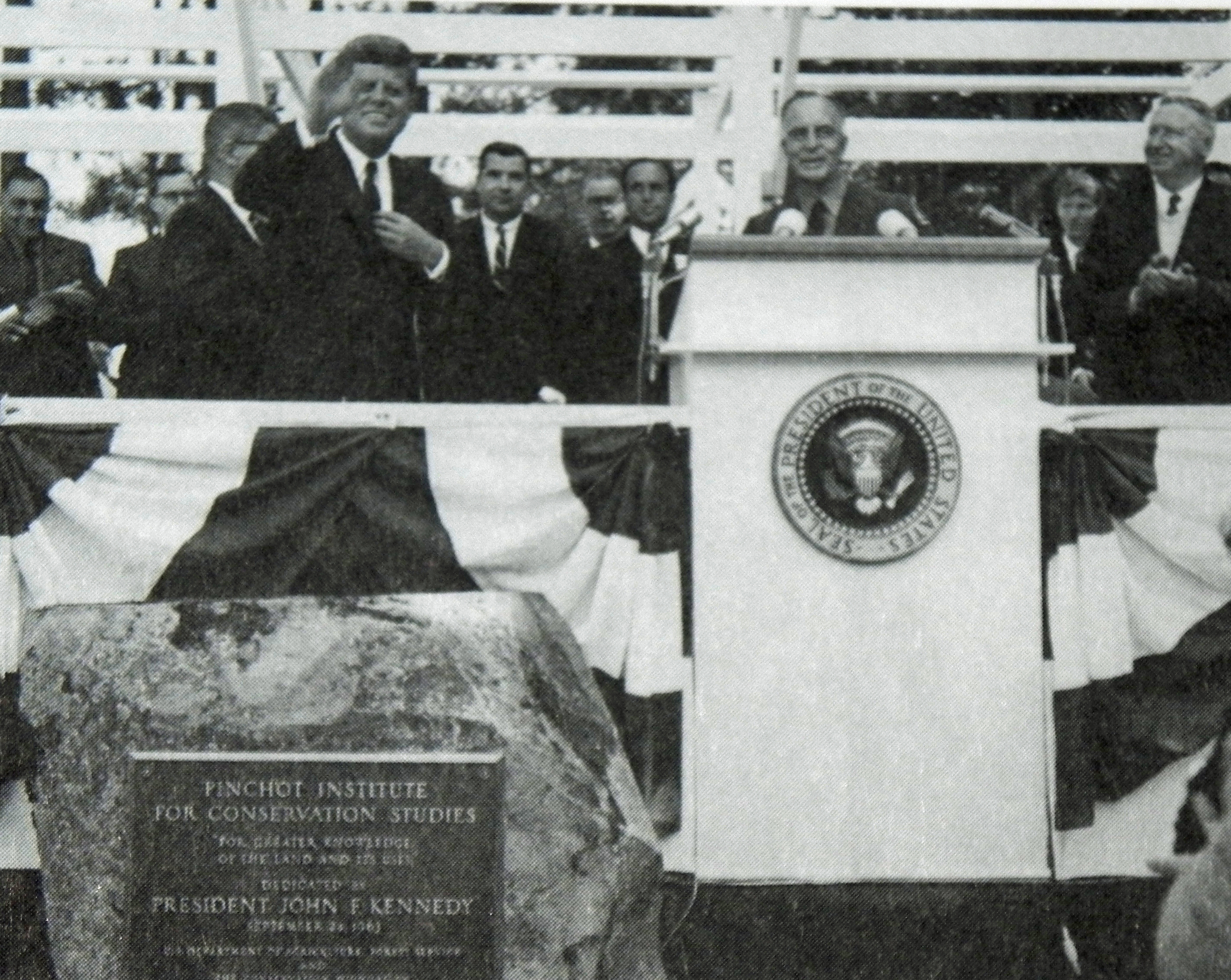
President John F. Kennedy and U.S. Forest Service chief Edward P. Cliff at the dedication of the Pinchot Institute in Milford, Pennsylvania in 1963.

The idea for the Pinchot Institute came about in 1961 when Gifford Bryce Pinchot proposed to donate the Pinchot estate at Grey Towers to serve as the home of a new center for education and studies in environmental and natural resource policy. The Pinchot Institute was dedicated by President John F. Kennedy on September 24, 1963.

In 1966, the U.S. Department of Interior designated Grey Towers as a National Historic Landmark. Grey Towers needed significant renovation to bring the historic home to its new role as a world-class conference center. In 1980, more than $16 million in federal, state, and private funds were raised to do so. The restoration was completed in 2001 and Grey Towers reopened to the public on August 11, 2001—the 115th anniversary of the original completion of Grey Towers. It further strengthened the shared mission of the Pinchot Institute and Grey Towers to continue Gifford Pinchot’s philosophy that in order to be effective, natural resource conservation must be not only ecologically sound, but economically viable and socially responsible.

With the heads of the developing environmental movement appointed to the board, including Gifford Bryce Pinchot, Forest Service Chief Ed Cliff, Laurence Rockefeller, Fairfield Osborne, the Institute undertook the development of a national conservation education curriculum. After twenty years serving on the Senate staff, Jim Giltmier was selected as the first executive of the Institute. He helped to develop key statutes governing the conservation, management, and research of natural resources in the United States.

Today the Pinchot Institute has grown to be an internationally recognized organization with programs and projects both nationally and abroad. Starting in 2002, the Pinchot Institute partnered with rural communities to sustainably manage tropical forests in Ecuador through their Ecomadera project. In addition to protecting tropical forests and privately owned buffer forests adjacent to globally significant biodiversity reserves, the Institute is working to provide living wages to impoverished communities.

== See also ==
- Grey Towers National Historic Site
