= St. John's Protestant Episcopal Church (Stamford, Connecticut) =

Historic church in Connecticut, United States

- U.S. National Register of Historic Places
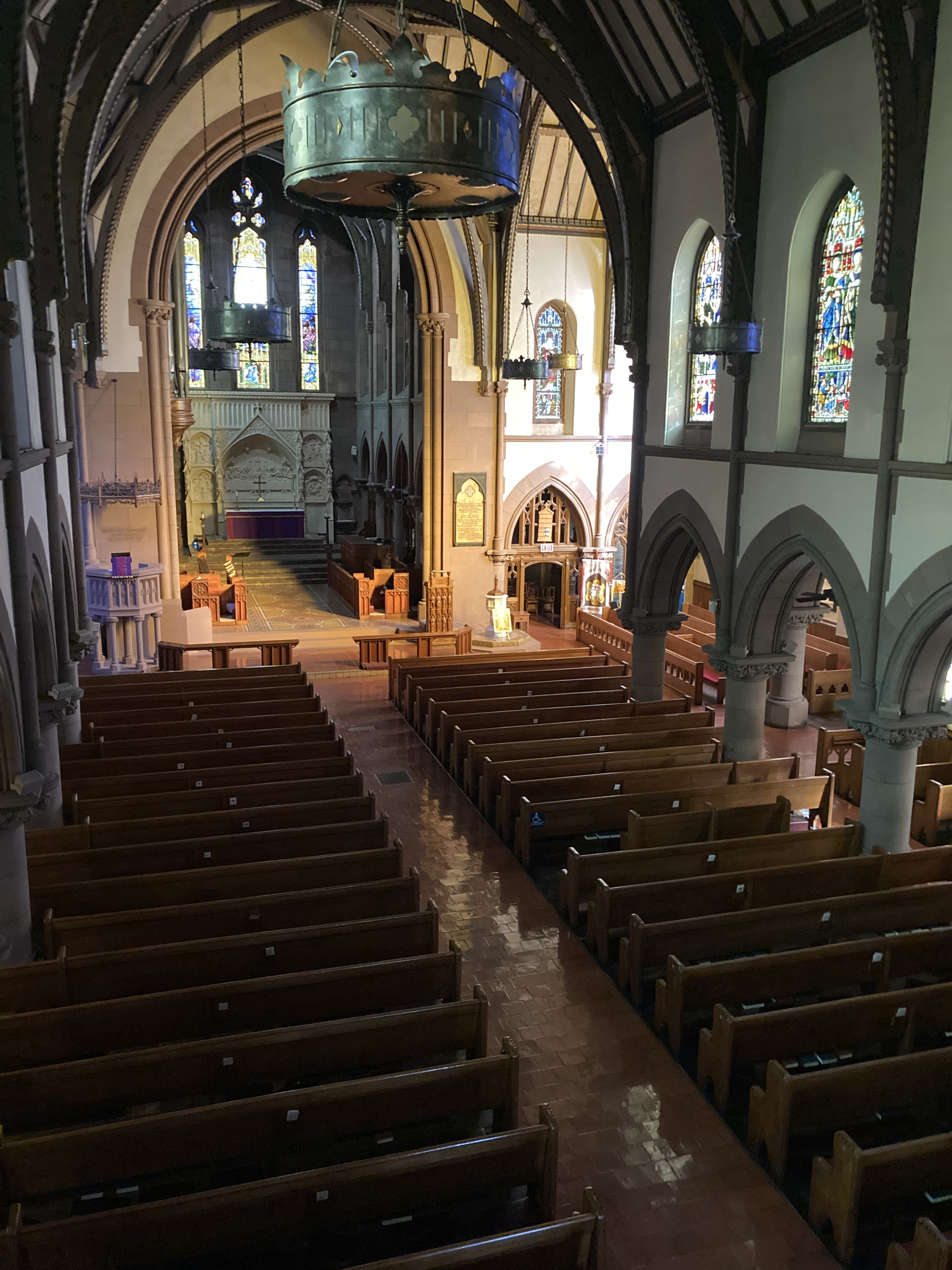

- Location within Connecticut Location within the United States
- Location: 628 Main Street, Stamford, Connecticut
- Coordinates: 41°3′17″N 73°32′2″W
- Area: less than one acre
- Built: 1869
- Architect: William Potter, Richard M. Upjohn
- Architectural style: Late Gothic Revival, Gothic, Queen Anne
- MPS: Downtown Stamford Ecclesiastical Complexes TR
- NRHP reference No.: 87002128
- Added to NRHP: December 24, 1987

St. John's Protestant Episcopal Church is an historic church located at 628 Main Street in Stamford, Connecticut. The church (the congregation's third since its founding in 1742) is an English Gothic Revival structure, built in 1891 to a design by William Potter. It has buttressed stone construction, with a compound-arch entry and a large rose stained-glass window. The associated parish house, also a Gothic Victorian structure, was designed by Richard M. Upjohn and built in 1869–72.

The church reported 986 members in 2020 and 179 members in 2025. Plate and pledge income for the congregation in 2025 was $143,095 with average Sunday attendance (ASA) of 83. This was a relative decrease from ASA of 112 persons reported in 2016.

== Rectors ==
The first rector of St. John's Church was installed in 1748, and the following individuals have served as rector of the parish.

- Ebeneezer Dibblee, 1748–1799
- Jonathan Judd, 1812–1822
- Ambrose Seymour Todd, 1823–1861
- Walter Mitchell, 1861–1866
- William Tatlock, 1866–1896
- Charles Morris Addison, 1897–1919
- Gerald A. Cunningham, 1920–1942
- Stanley F. Hemsley, 1942–1974
- Douglas E. Theuner, 1974–1986
- Leander Harding, 1989–2005
- James R. Wheeler, 2007–2019
- Andrew A. Kryzak, 2022-

== See also ==
- St. Luke's Chapel
- National Register of Historic Places listings in Stamford, Connecticut
