= St. John's Protestant Episcopal Church (Charleston, South Carolina) =

Historic church in the United States

Coordinates: 32.794439°N 79.936693°W

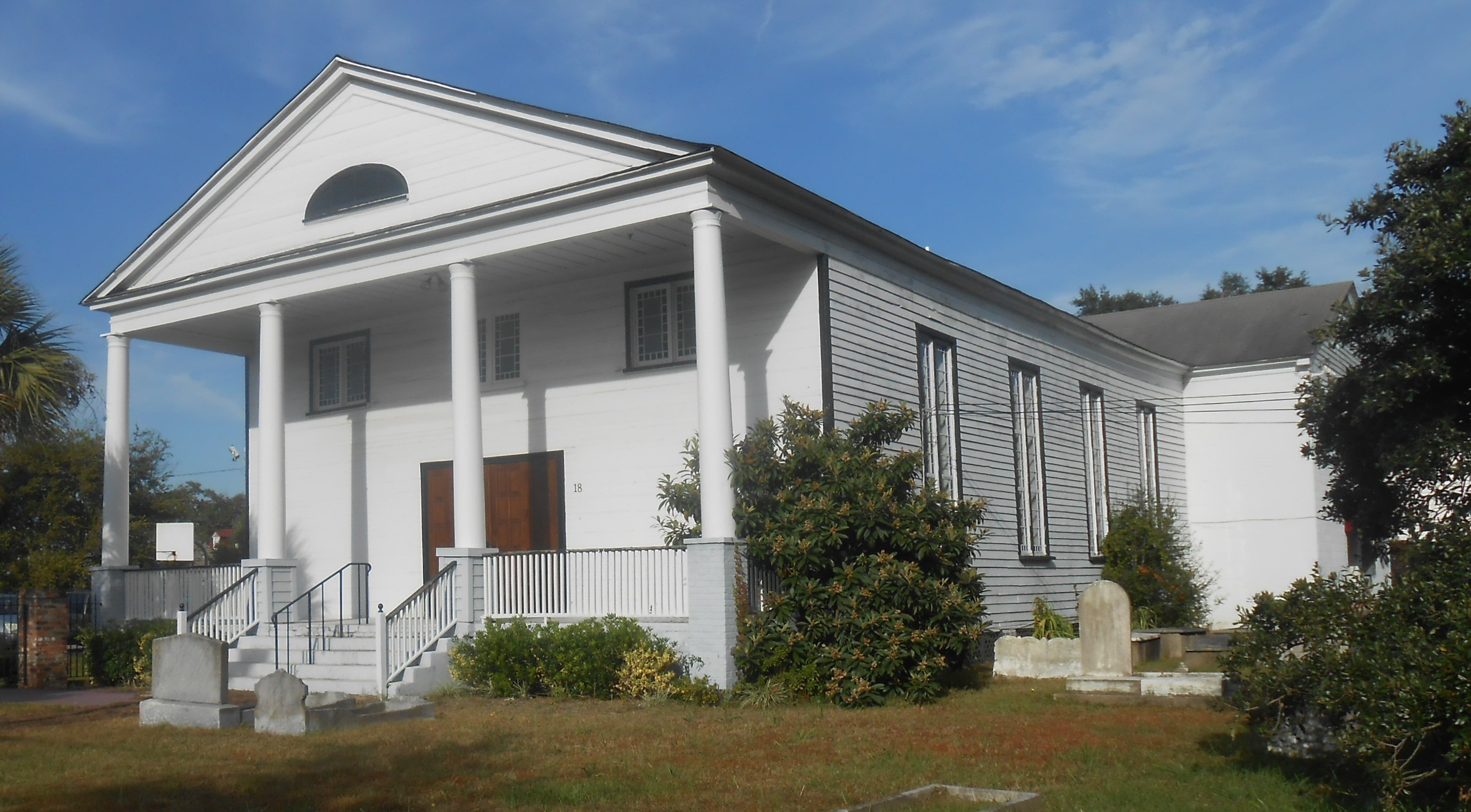
St. John's is one of the oldest churches in Charleston, South Carolina.

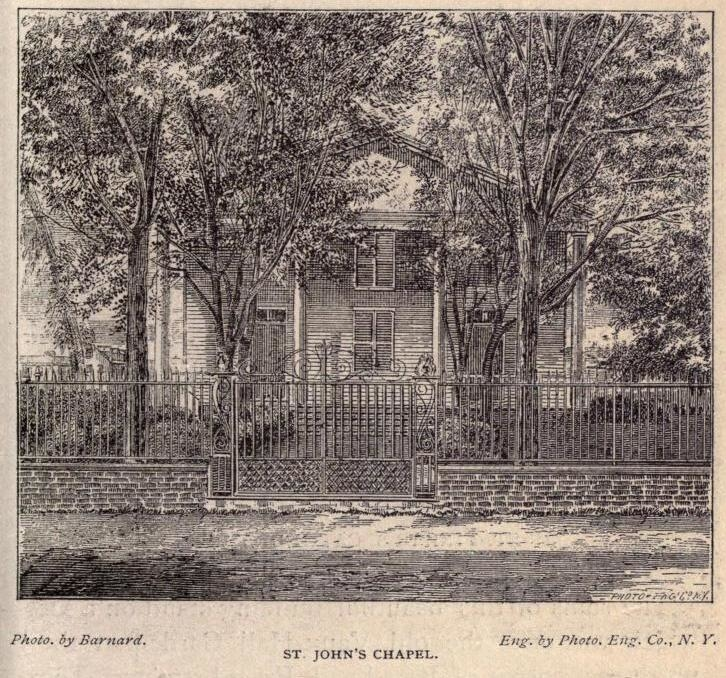
St. John's Chapel appeared in an 1875 illustrated guide to Charleston.

St. John's Protestant Episcopal Church is a historic church located at 18 Hanover St., Charleston, South Carolina.

In 1832, the Charleston Protestant Episcopal Domestic Female Missionary Society bought the land from the Bank of South Carolina. On October 13, 1839, the church opened for its first service, and the building was consecrated on July 14, 1840. The surrounding property was put to use as a cemetery before the building was constructed; the oldest grave dates to 1835.

On October 18, 1912, the church was finally incorporated as its own church and not just a mission. It was renovated in 1939 and again in 1947 but remains essentially unaltered from its original 1839 appearance.

On January 29, 2015, the Preservation Society of Charleston recognized work on the church with one of its annual Carolopolis Awards for excellence in restoration.
