= St. Luke's Chapel (Stamford, Connecticut) =

Historic church in Connecticut, United States

- U.S. National Register of Historic Places
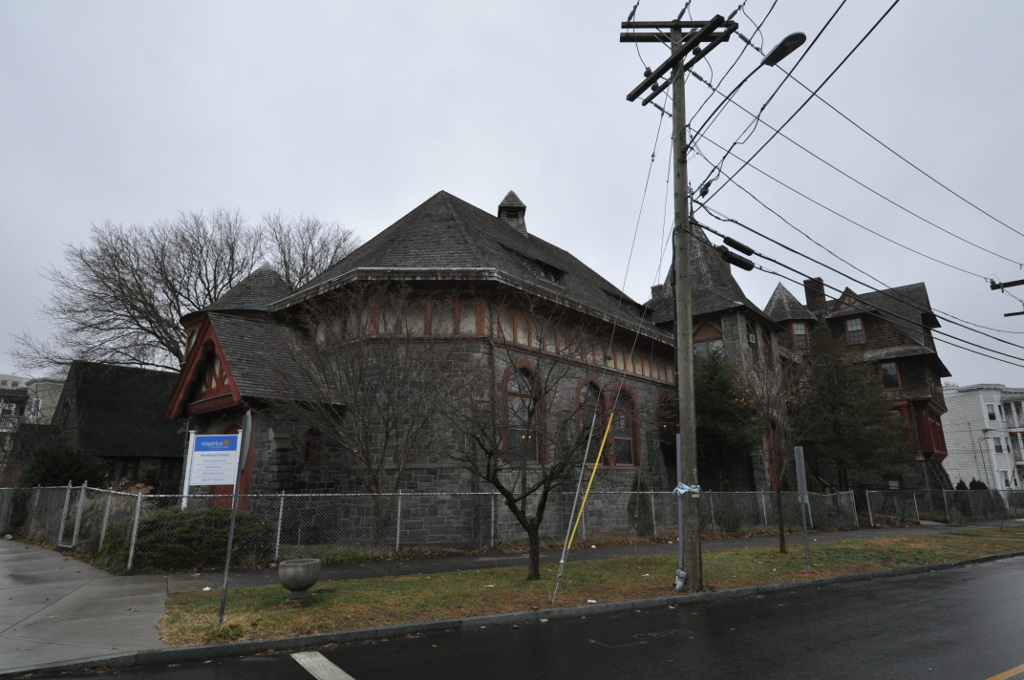

- Location within Connecticut Location within the United States
- Location: 714 Pacific Street, Stamford, Connecticut
- Coordinates: 41°2′34″N 73°32′16″W
- Area: less than one acre
- Built: 1891
- Architect: H. Edward Ficken
- Architectural style: Late Gothic Revival, Shingle Style, Romanesque
- MPS: Downtown Stamford Ecclesiastical Complexes TR
- NRHP reference No.: 87002129
- Added to NRHP: December 24, 1987

St. Luke's Chapel is a historic building at 714 Pacific Street in Stamford, Connecticut. The chapel was built in 1891 and added to the National Register of Historic Places in 1987.

== History ==
St. Luke's Chapel is an Episcopal chapel that was built in 1891. The chapel was built by members of St. John's Episcopal Church in Stamford and continues to be owned by that parish. St. Luke's chapel includes Late Gothic Revival, Shingle Style, and Romanesque architecture. The 0.9-acre (0.36 ha) listing included 3 contributing buildings: the church, a social hall known as the Parish House, and a rectory.

=== List of Historical Places ===
In 1987, St. Luke's Chapel was added to the National Register of Historic Places. It is listed for its meeting architectural criteria. The property was covered in a Multiple Property Submission study of Downtown Stamford Ecclesiastical Complexes.

== Community programs ==
=== Homeless Shelter ===
The mission at this chapel was renewed in 1982 through the work of a small group of seven laypersons who lived in a form of Christian community found in the Acts of the apostles. During the seven years at the chapel, many of this community lived in the building which served as a temporary housing shelter for person's displaced from their living spaces. Additional ministries where a summer camp, a food co-op, a clothing exchange and a tutorial program for the neighborhood. The red cross used the larger gymnasium as a temporary emergency shelter for large number of persons displaced by fire (or other natural disasters. Many neighboring churches from many different denominations participated in a dinner held for the residence of the shelter. Additionally, two group homes were started in neighboring apartments, called Gilead house and St Francis house, for the chronically mentally ill. After seven years of service, Rev. Shuster was called to continue the ministry. In 1990, St. Luke's Chapel provided a homeless shelter for homeless women and children. At that time, the chapel was affiliated with The Coalition for the Homeless in Stamford.

=== St. Luke's Lifeworks ===
St. Luke's Lifeworks was created by attendees of St. Luke's Church. Lifeworks was renamed "Inspirica" as a Homeless shelter for families and also provides assistance for individuals suffering with HIV/AIDS. In 2009, Rev. Richard L. Schuster was the executive director until his passing.

== See also ==
- National Register of Historic Places listings in Stamford, Connecticut
