= Grey Towers National Historic Site =

Home outside Milford, Pennsylvania

- Gifford Pinchot House
- U.S. National Register of Historic Places
- U.S. National Historic Landmark
- U.S. National Historic Site
- Pennsylvania state historical marker
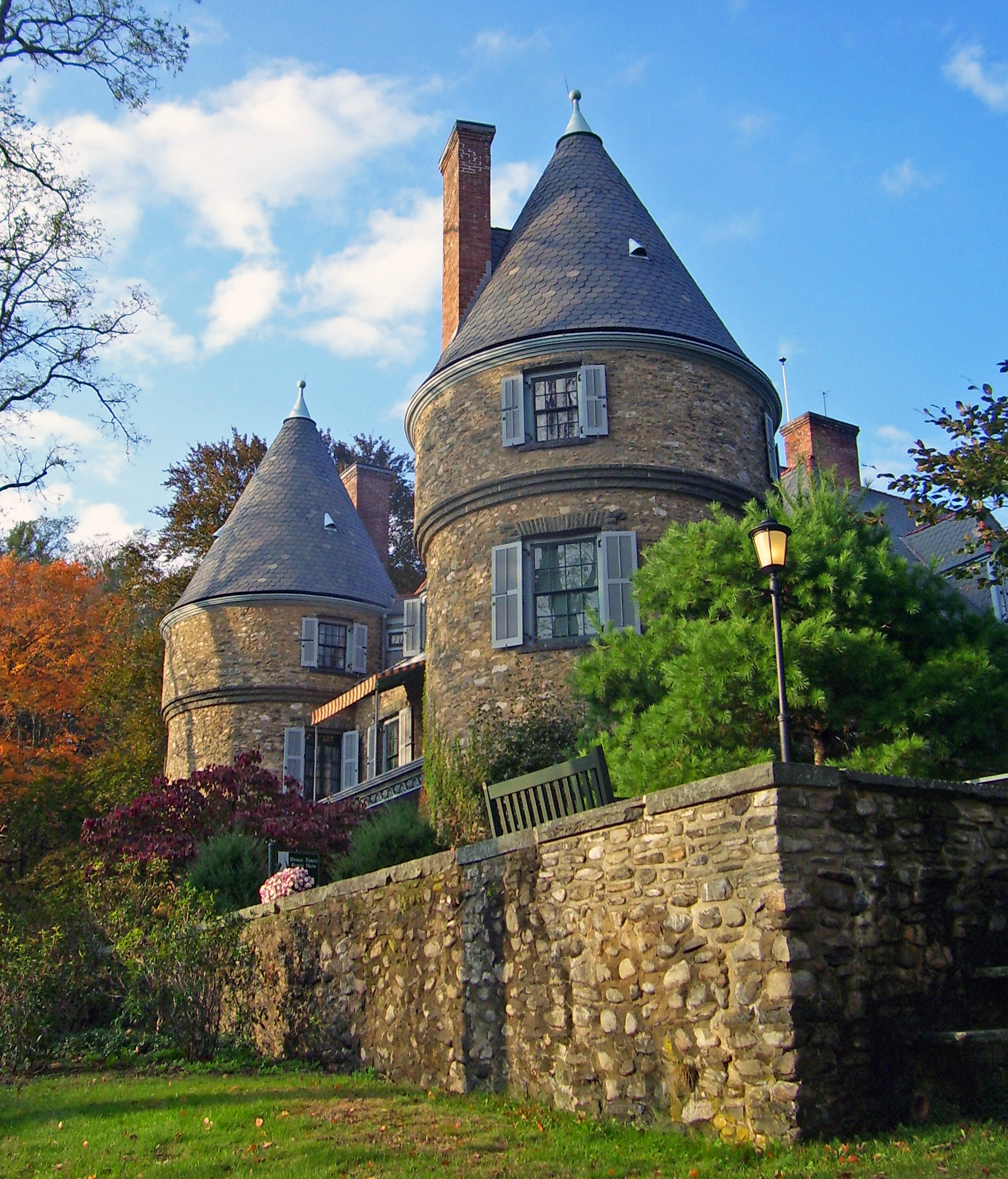
- Two of the fieldstone chateau's three conical towers (2007)
- Location: Milford, Pennsylvania, U.S.
- Nearest city: Port Jervis, New York, U.S.
- Coordinates: 41°19′39″N 74°49′15″W
- Area: 102 acres (41 ha)
- Built: 1886
- Architect: Richard Morris Hunt; H. Edwards Ficken
- Architectural style: Neo-Norman
- Website: Grey Towers National Historic Site
- NRHP reference No.: 66000694

Significant dates
- Added to NRHP: October 15, 1966
- Designated NHL: May 23, 1963
- Designated PHMC: June 1, 1948

Grey Towers National Historic Site, also known as Gifford Pinchot House or The Pinchot Institute, is located just off US 6 west of Milford, Pennsylvania, in Milford Township. It is the ancestral summer home of Gifford Pinchot, first chief of the newly developed United States Forest Service (USFS) and twice elected governor of Pennsylvania.

The house, built in the style of a French château to reflect the Pinchot family's French origins, was designed by Richard Morris Hunt with some later work by H. Edwards Ficken. Situated on the hills above Milford, it overlooks the Delaware River. Gifford Pinchot grew up there and returned during the summers when his later life took him to Washington, D.C. and Harrisburg. His wife, Cornelia Bryce Pinchot, made substantial changes to the interior of the home and gardens, in collaboration with several different architects, during that time.

In 1963, his family donated it and the surrounding 102 acres (41 ha) to the Forest Service; it is the only U.S. National Historic Site managed by that agency. Three years later, the Department of the Interior designated it a National Historic Landmark. Today it is open to the public for tours and hiking on its trails. It is also home to the Pinchot Institute, which carries on his work in conservation.

== Building and grounds ==
The mansion itself is a three-story L-shaped fieldstone chateau. Conical roofed towers at three of the corners give the property its name. A service wing juts out from the fourth corner. As originally built it contained 43 rooms, with the first floor featuring a large entrance hall, billiard room, dining room, library and sitting room. Bedrooms were located on the second floor, with more on the third floor plus storage spaces and children's playrooms.

The house boasts a number of outbuildings. On the 303 acres (123 ha) of the combined parcels that made up the original estate, there are 48 total buildings, structures and sites, all but eight of which are considered contributing to its historic value. These include nearby cottages known as the Letter and Bait Boxes, a unique outdoor dining facility called the Finger Bowl, a Forester's Cottage used as a residence by the Pinchot descendants, an open-air theatre, the former Yale School of Forestry's summer school, and a white pine plantation established by Gifford Pinchot.

== History ==
There are four distinct periods in the history of Grey Towers: its initial construction under James Pinchot and his ownership, Gifford and Cornelia Pinchot's years, the early years with the Forest Service, and a more recent period of historic preservation efforts.

=== James Pinchot ===
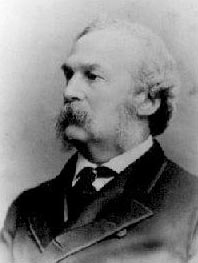
James Wallace Pinchot

In 1875, Gifford's father, James Wallace Pinchot (1831–1908), retired after a successful career in the wallpaper and window shade business. He bought 3,000 acres (1,200 ha) overlooking the Delaware in Dingman Township, just outside the borough. Particularly attractive to him and his family was a small waterfall on Sawkill Creek.

There, James Pinchot's primary endeavor was planning and designing Grey Towers and the land around it. At first, he developed the land along lines of the ornamental farm advocated by Andrew Jackson Downing. The original winding drive up the hill was meant to show off his orchards. In 1884, he retained Hunt, a family friend, to put on paper these ideas for a French-style chateau, modeled after the Marquis de Lafayette's LaGrange and reflecting the Pinchot family's origin in France. Two years later construction was complete, but not before Pinchot altered the plans slightly to save money. While Hunt was away in Europe, he also had Ficken alter Hunt's design slightly when bedrock on the site made it difficult to build the raised foundation Hunt had originally planned. Ficken added some of his own decorative touches to the house, such as the front door, interior paneling and wrought iron porches on the south and east facades.

Almost all the materials came from local sources. Hemlock timbers were floated down the Delaware on rafts from Lackawaxen, and another river town, Shohola, provided the bluestone and windows. Roofing slate came from across the river, in Lafayette, New Jersey. All the workers and contractors hired were Milford residents. The total cost was $19,000 for the house itself and $24,000 for furnishings.

In 1906, a design by Frederick Law Olmsted (who had died three years earlier) was implemented for an old cemetery on the property. (Olmsted's contribution is unclear, as all had existed from the early 19th century, before the Pinchot family's ownership of the land.) Today it is in poor condition.

James Pinchot had come to regret the environmental damage forest-product industries such as his had done, and he endowed the Yale School of Forestry, the first graduate forestry program in the country. From 1901 to 1926, the Grey Towers estate grounds served as the school's primary summer preparatory fieldwork location. Only ruins of the educational buildings exist today.

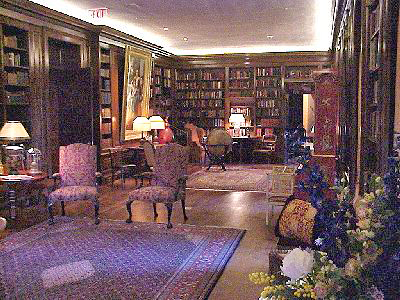
The estate's library today, expanded under the direction of Cornelia Pinchot

=== Gifford and Cornelia ===
James Pinchot died in 1908, and his wife, Mary, died 10 days after Gifford married Cornelia Bryce in August, 1914. He and his brother Amos split the estate, with Amos taking the half on which a small forester's cabin was the main dwelling and Gifford taking the house. The couple began spending their summers at Grey Towers. Cornelia realized that Gifford's developing political career, and hers (she ran for Congress three times), required a residence more suited to entertaining guests than it had originally been intended to be, and set about modernizing the house. At her behest, many alterations were made to the original first-floor plan. The most significant involved merging the dining and breakfast rooms to create a large sitting room, and similarly enlarging the library by adding the living room to it. "The first thing my wife did", Pinchot told the Saturday Evening Post in 1922, "was to break down the partition walls and let in light and air ... [O]f course, it's a vast improvement."

An avid gardener, she turned her attention to the grounds. Chester Holmes Aldrich first designed a swimming pool for the property, a raised structure enclosed on three sides by a pergola of stone piers and wooden trellises. After that came the Bait Box, a playhouse for the couple's son, Gifford Bryce Pinchot. Elliptical openings in the stone walls around the courtyard provide views over the surrounding landscape. Next, in the late 1920s, when her husband was serving his first term as governor, came the Letter Box, a small cottage intended both as an archive for his papers and an office for his political staff when he was in residence. In their last collaboration, Aldrich and Cornelia Pinchot added a moat, which finally gave the house the raised effect Hunt had originally intended. In building it became necessary to lengthen the east lawn and build a new stone wall to support the moat.

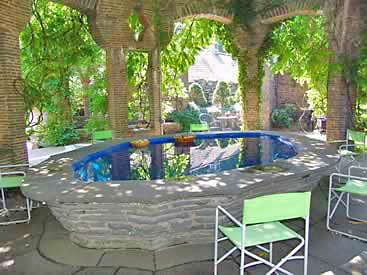
The Finger Bowl

In the early 1930s, she hired William Lawrence Bottomley to create a unique addition known as the Finger Bowl, an outdoor dining area consisting of a raised pool surrounded by a flat ledge. Chairs were pulled up to the ledge and food was served from bowls floating on the water. It was sheltered by a wisteria-covered arbor supported by 12 stone piers. In the late 1930s, Gifford Pinchot started the White Pine Plantation to reforest some old farmland near the mansion. He was particularly interested in that species since it was the dominant tree in the forests of Pike County and had been heavily harvested during the previous century.

=== Forest Service ===
After his mother died in 1960, Gifford Bryce Pinchot donated the building to the Forest Service, as the family had planned. The agency intended to use the house as a conference center, and had to replace some interior walls that had suffered insect and water damage. Various other rooms in the wing and second floor were converted to storage or office use, and the swimming pool was filled in, in 1979, when it became a safety and maintenance problem. A parking lot was built to the northwest.

The Pinchot Institute, which also has a role in administering the site, was dedicated by President John F. Kennedy on September 24, 1963. That same year Grey Towers was one of the first sites declared a National Historic Landmark by the Secretary of the Interior.

In 1980, the USFS realized how much its renovations had damaged an architecturally significant structure and began trying to undo some of the changes it had made. It developed a plan to restore the house and estate to a condition similar to the way it had been in Pinchot's era, in consultation with the Park Service's Harper's Ferry Center, and hired staff with expertise in landscape and architecture. After a brief closing for this renovation, it reopened on August 11, 2001, Gifford Pinchot's birthday. The state of Pennsylvania's Department of Natural Resources also made a $2 million grant available for renovations to the entrance, entry road and parking facilities. In 2007 the USFS restored the swimming pool.

== Today ==
The grounds are open daily from 9 a.m.-4:30 p.m. from Memorial Day weekend through October. Guided tours home and gardens start every hour on the hour from 11 a.m.-3 p.m.; there is a fee except when stated on their calendar of events. Self-guided interpretive trails devoted to the history of the Pinchot family, forestry and the bluebirds nesting in the woods are available on the grounds. There is also a gift shop.

The Pinchot Institute also hosts conferences related to conservation matters. They are held either in the upper floors of the mansion or in the Letter Box.

== Gallery ==
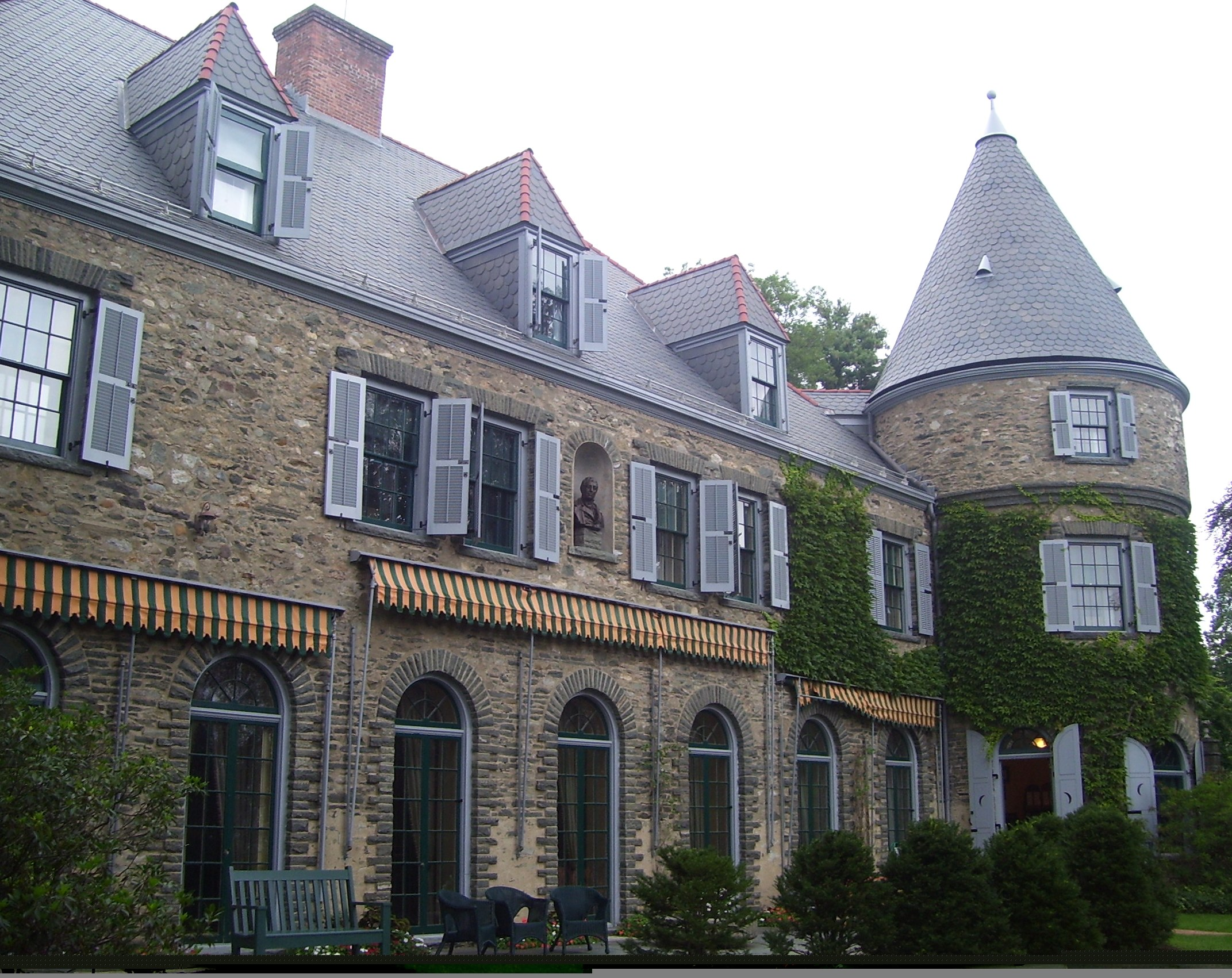
Partial front facade

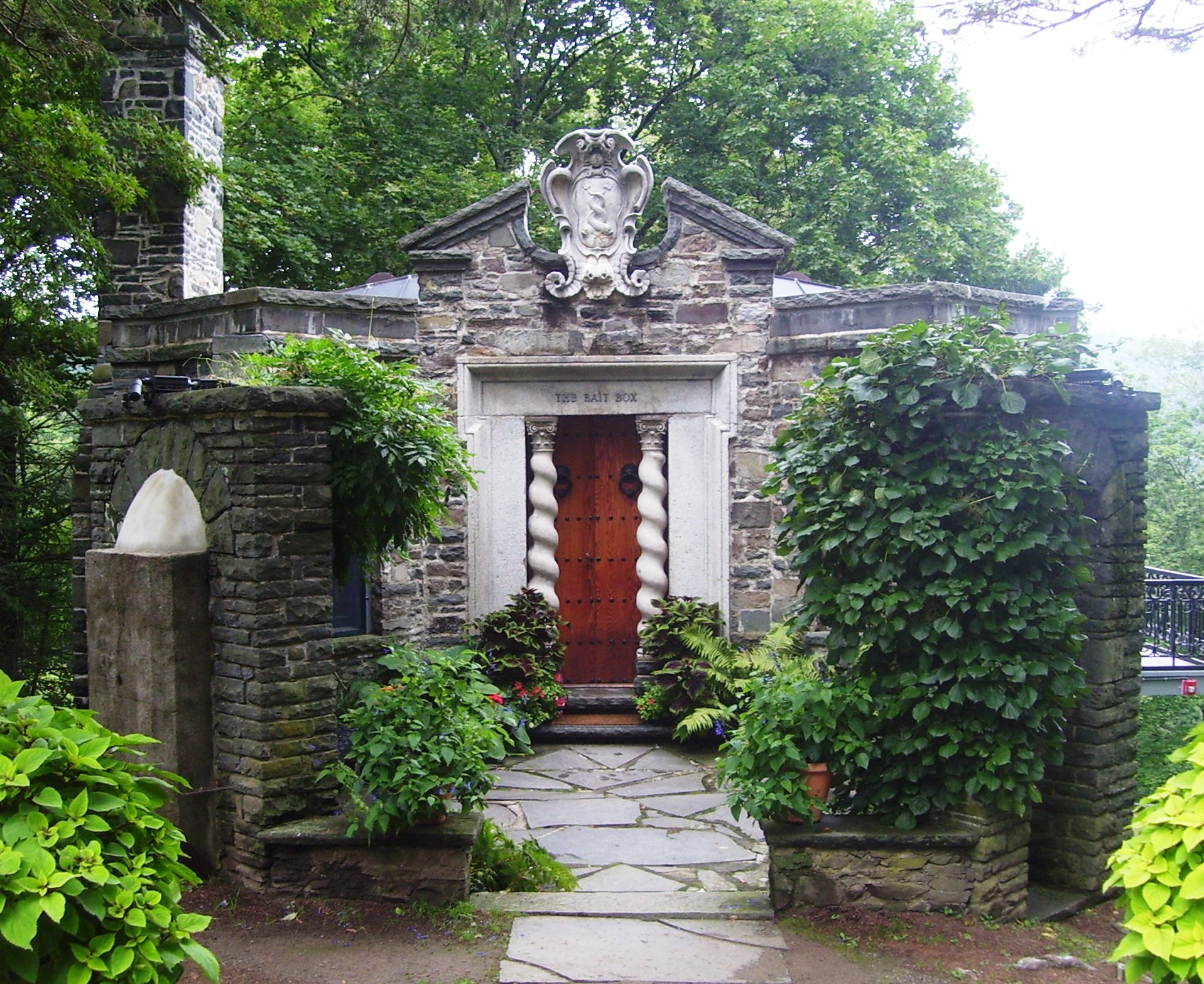
The Bait Box

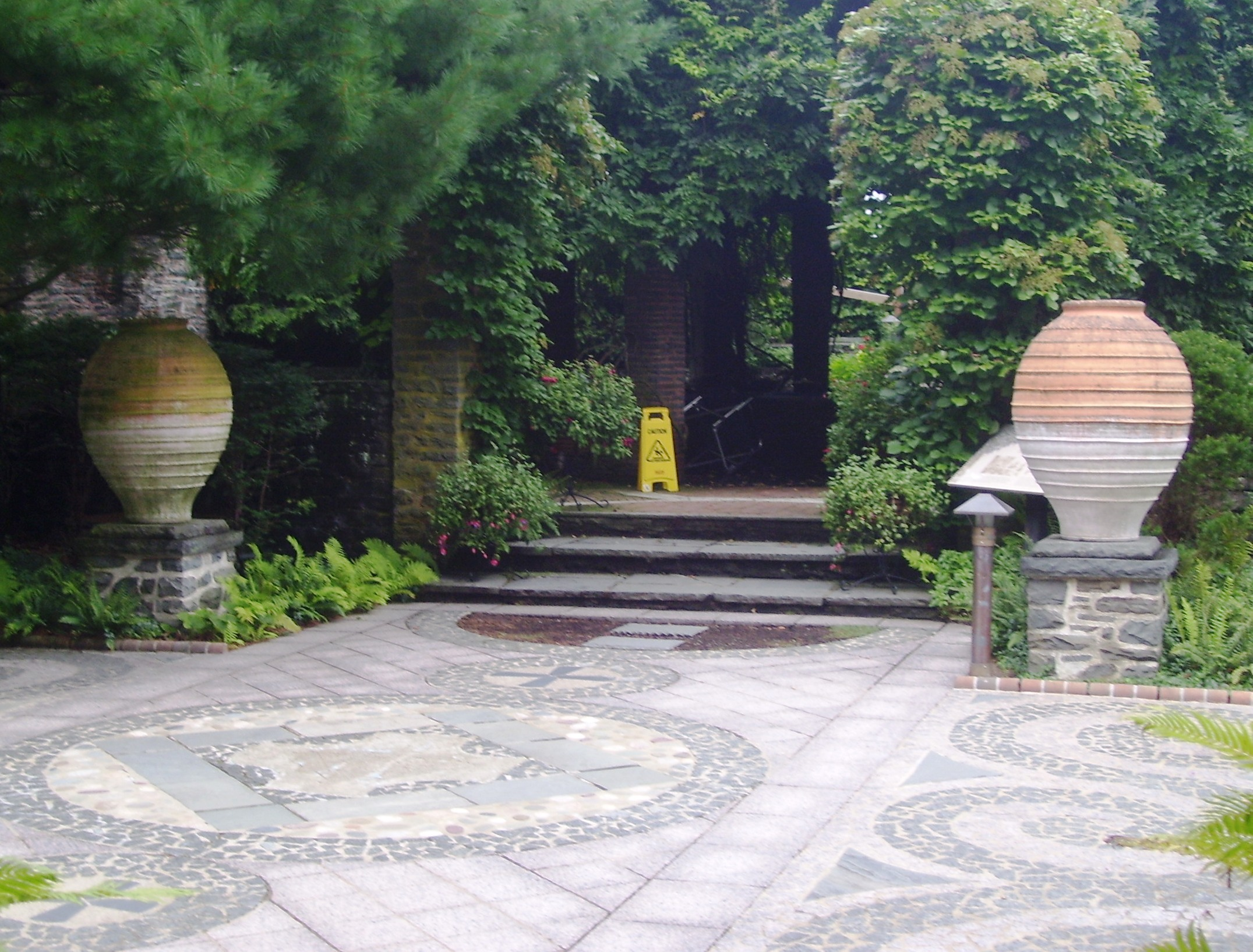
Patio leading to the Finger Bowl

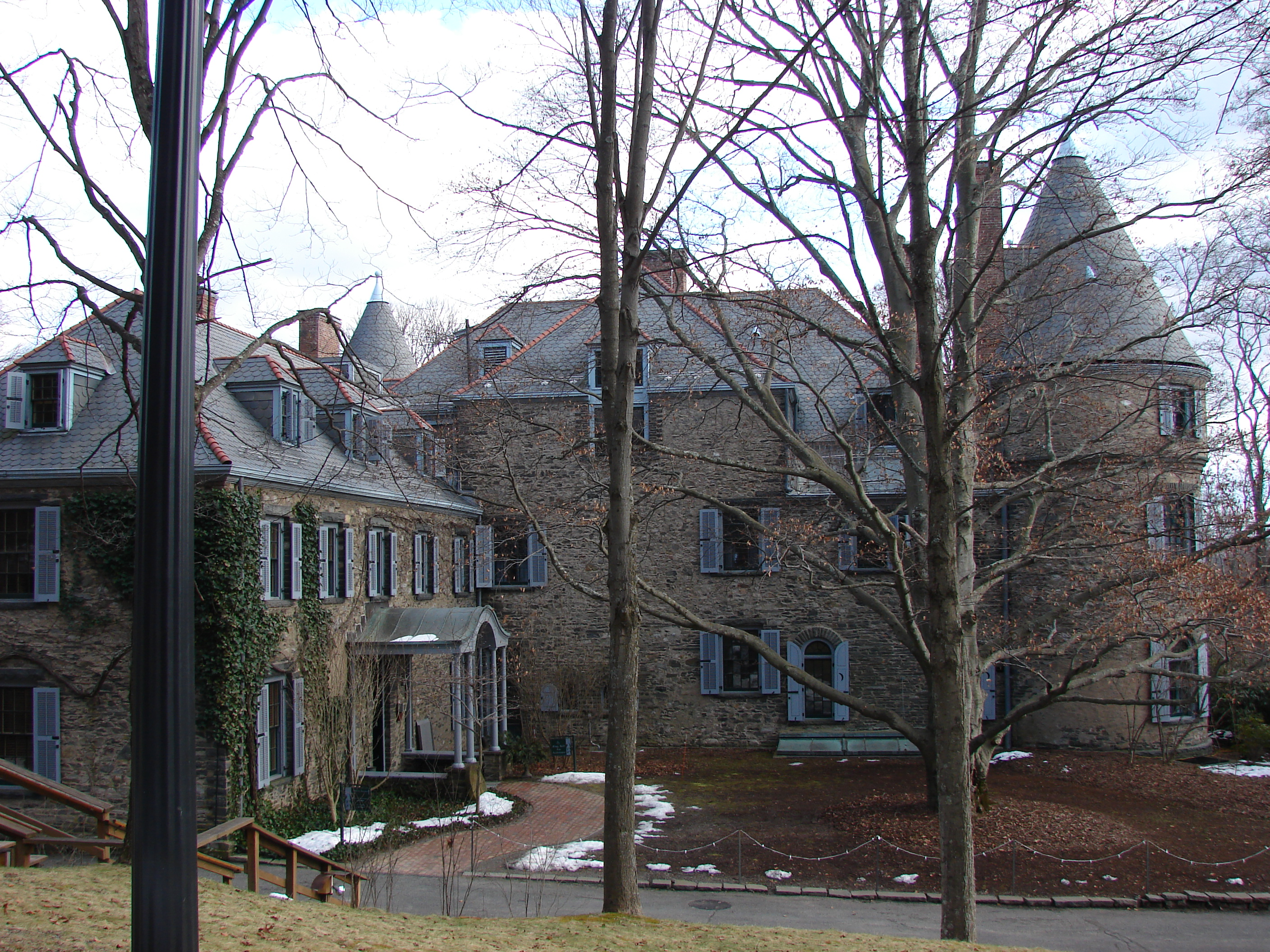
Part of the rear
