= Milford Transit District =

Primary provider of mass transportation in Milford, Connecticut

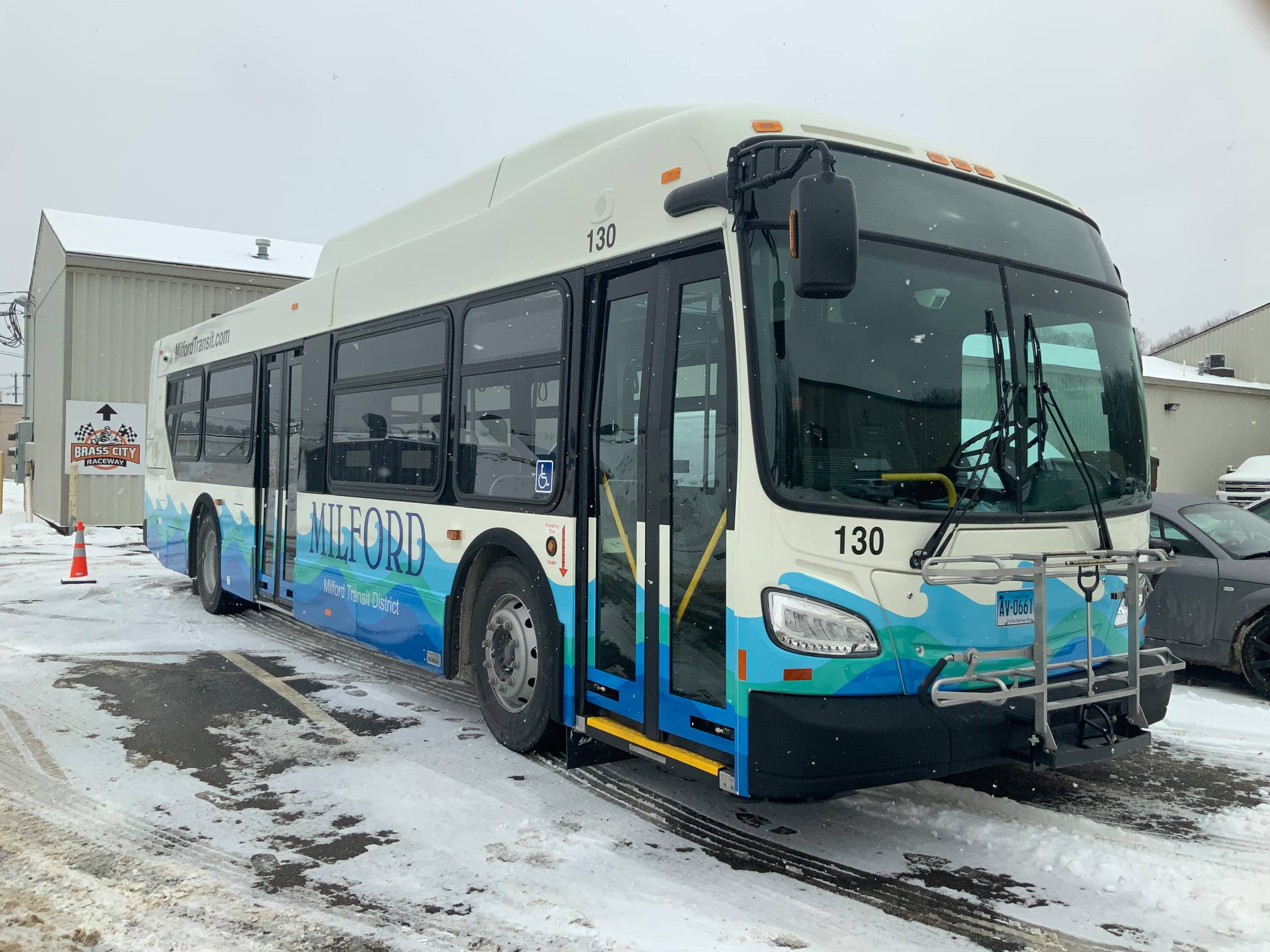
- Milford Transit District bus (2021 New Flyer XD35)
- Parent: Connecticut Dept of Transportation
- Founded: 1977
- Headquarters: 259 Research Drive, Milford, Connecticut 06460
- Locale: Greater Milford
- Service area: Greater Milford
- Service type: Local bus service
- Routes: 4 (Route 2 operates Monday-Friday, Routes 3 and 4 operate Monday-Saturday, and CL operates 7 days a week in conjunction with Greater Bridgeport Transit and Norwalk Transit District)
- Destinations: Greater Milford
- Hubs: Silver Sands State Park, Milford Center/Senior Center, The Dock Shopping Center, Connecticut Post Mall
- Daily ridership: 2009:1,379 (weekdays); 817 (Saturday); 362 (Sunday)
- Operator: Milford Transit District
- Website: Milford Transit

Milford Transit District is the primary provider of mass transportation in Milford, Connecticut, United States. Two routes provided by the agency operate Monday-Saturday, and one route operates Monday-Friday. Milford Transit district provides bus service to the greater Milford as well as to the Cities/Towns of Stratford, Connecticut Bridgeport, Connecticut, & Norwalk, Connecticut on the coastal Link route. The fleet was previously composed of New Flyer Low Floor model buses but now utilizes New Flyer Xcelsior diesel and electric buses.

== Routes/Schedules ==
Routes.	Destinations	Days of operation	Notes
2: Devon/CT Post Mall	Milford (Metro-North station) Connecticut Post Mall & Milford Senior Center via downtown Milford Devon (Milford), and The Dock Shopping Center	Monday-Friday	AM/PM rush hour No Service on weekends or observed holidays
3: West Shore	Downtown Milford Milford (Metro-North station) via Silver Sands State Park / Walnut Beach to Devon (Milford) & Milford Point	Monday-Saturday	Routes 3 & 4 connect to each other No Service on Sundays or observed holidays
4: Woodmont	Milford (Metro-North station) via Connecticut Post Mall to Woodmont, Connecticut	Monday-Saturday	Routes 3 & 4 connect to each other No Service on Sundays or observed holidays

== Coastal Link ==
Milford Transit District also partially maintains bus service from early mornings to early evenings on the Coastal Link (formerly Route 2) seven days a week. Providing service from the Connecticut Post Mall in Milford, Connecticut to the Bridgeport bus station in Bridgeport, Connecticut which also connects to rail service at the Bridgeport station (Connecticut) for the New Haven Line and from there on to the Wheels Hub in Norwalk, Connecticut. The service runs in conjunction with Greater Bridgeport Transit Authority and Norwalk Transit District using their buses as well. Frequency is roughly every 30 minutes.

== Silver Sands Shuttle ==
Milford Transit District operates a free seasonal out-and-back shuttle service from the Old Gate Lane Commuter parking lot to downtown Milford & Silver Sands State Park. The shuttle runs on weekends from 9:00 A.M.-6:00 P.M from the end of May thru the beginning of September as well as on Memorial Day, juneteenth, Independence Day (United States), & Labor Day.

== Door-to-door van service ==
Milford Transit District operates paratransit service for New Haven county in compliance with the Americans with Disabilities Act of 1990. The service is provided to all points in Milford, and to the Bridgeport and New Haven areas. All paratransit buses are lift equipped.
