= West Haven station =

Railroad station in Connecticut

West Haven
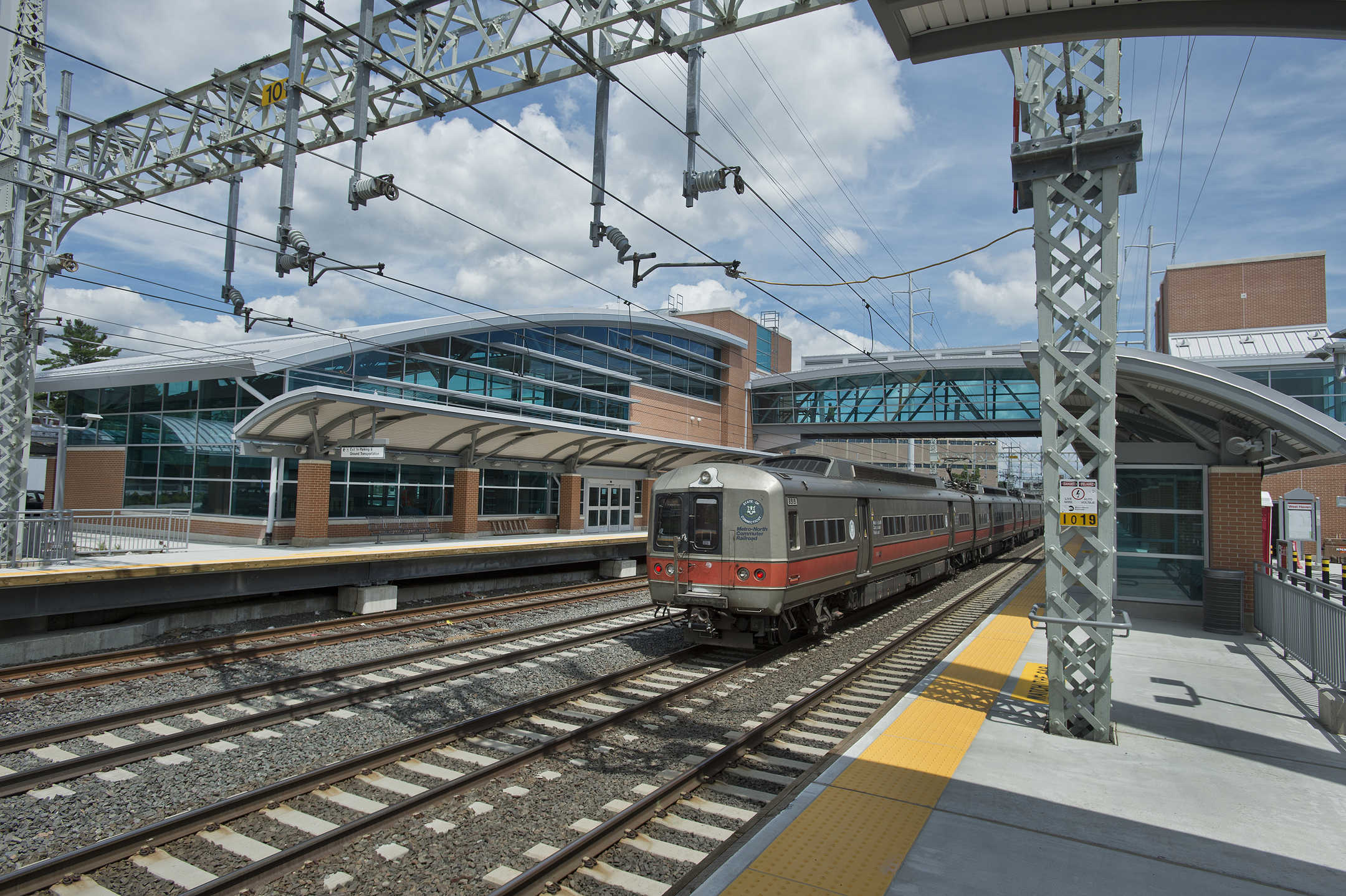
- A New Haven Line train passes West Haven

General information
- Location: 20 Railroad Avenue; West Haven, Connecticut
- Coordinates: 41.271142°N 72.963199°W
- Line: ConnDOT New Haven Line (Northeast Corridor)
- Platforms: 2 side platforms
- Tracks: 4

Construction
- Parking: 660 spaces
- Accessible: Yes

Other information
- Fare zone: 21

History
- Opened: August 18, 2013

Passengers
- 2018: 1,117 daily boardings (Metro-North)

Services
Preceding station	CT Rail	Following station
Milford toward Stamford	Shore Line East limited weekday service	New Haven Union Station toward New London
Preceding station	Metro-North Railroad	Following station
Milford toward Grand Central	New Haven Line	New Haven Terminus
Milford toward Grand Central	New Haven Line	New Haven peak service toward New Haven State Street
Location

West Haven station is a commuter rail station on the Metro-North Railroad's New Haven Line, located in West Haven, Connecticut. The station was built on Sawmill Road between Hood Terrace and Railroad Avenue, in the Elm Street-Wagner Place neighborhood. West Haven has 660 parking spaces in on-site lots (with the possibility of 300–400 more in a parking garage in a refurbished industrial building north of the station if warranted by future demand) as well as bicycle facilities. The station is accessible. West Haven has full service on the New Haven Line.

After a decade of studies, planning, and controversy over the station site, ground was broken for the station on November 10, 2010. The $80 million project included the station, with two 12-car platforms, a glass station building, and an overhead pedestrian bridge, as well as the restoration of the formerly abandoned fourth mainline track through the station. It is only the second new station on the line in a century, after Fairfield Metro (now Fairfield–Black Rock) in 2011. The station opened to passengers on August 18, 2013.

== Platforms and tracks ==
The station has two high-level side platforms, which can accommodate 12-car trains, serving the outer tracks of the four-track Northeast Corridor.

== History ==
=== Original stations ===
1916 valuation photo of the 1915 eastbound station building at West Haven, with the canopy of the 1895 westbound building behind

During the 19th and early 20th centuries, a station stop was located in West Haven between Washington and Campbell Avenues, about 0.7 miles (1.1 km) east of the modern station. The first West Haven station, at Washington Avenue, opened along with the rest of the New York and New Haven Railroad on December 25, 1848. The wood-framed building, located on the south (eastbound) side of the tracks, was moved west halfway to Campbell Avenue in 1895 when the line was quadruple-tracked. At that time, a second station was built on the westbound side across from the older station. The first station burned down on February 26, 1914, and was replaced by a new building by the middle of 1915. As trains grew longer and heavier, closely spaced village stops were retired in favor of more widely spaced downtown stations. West Haven closed in the mid-1920s, though the eastbound station building was not demolished until the 1940s. The station was briefly proposed to reopen in the 1950s following the construction of a Veterans Affairs hospital nearby; however, this did not come to fruition, and the idea was largely abandoned for several decades.

A short-lived station was also located at Front Avenue in West Haven on the New Haven and Derby Railroad. The station was at street level, with stairs to the platform on the elevated tracks. The station opened in 1871 and was closed by 1914.

=== Planning for a new station ===
In the late 1990s, Metro-North began considering adding a station in either West Haven or neighboring Orange to fill the ten-mile (16 km) gap between the Milford and New Haven stations—the longest such gap on the New Haven mainline. Both town governments were supportive of a station, which was then to cost $25–30 million. Support in West Haven was largely rallied by the West Haven Train Station Committee Inc., which circulated a petition eventually signed by 7600 residents. Support in Orange was both local by the Orange Railroad Committee and also aided by several employers, including Bayer Pharmaceuticals, whose employees were likely to use the station. In fall 2001, a site study and a regional transportation committee recommended the Orange site (at Marsh Hill Road) based on cost, time considerations, and highway access. However, in December 2001, the South Central Council of Governments voted instead to support the West Haven site, citing the economic needs of West Haven versus comparatively wealthy Orange.

Orange's first selectman originally planned to appeal the decision, and controversy continued. The sustained bitter animosity between the two towns was cited in a study of bargaining between municipalities. The Final Environmental Impact Statement, issued in June 2007, considered both station sites, noting that "The recommendation of the West Haven site does not preclude the construction of a commuter railroad station at the Orange site in the future, as the demand for additional parking and service warrants, and as additional funding becomes available." In 2011 - even after ground was broken at West Haven - state lawmakers considered a funding deal to build an Orange station.

=== Design and funding ===
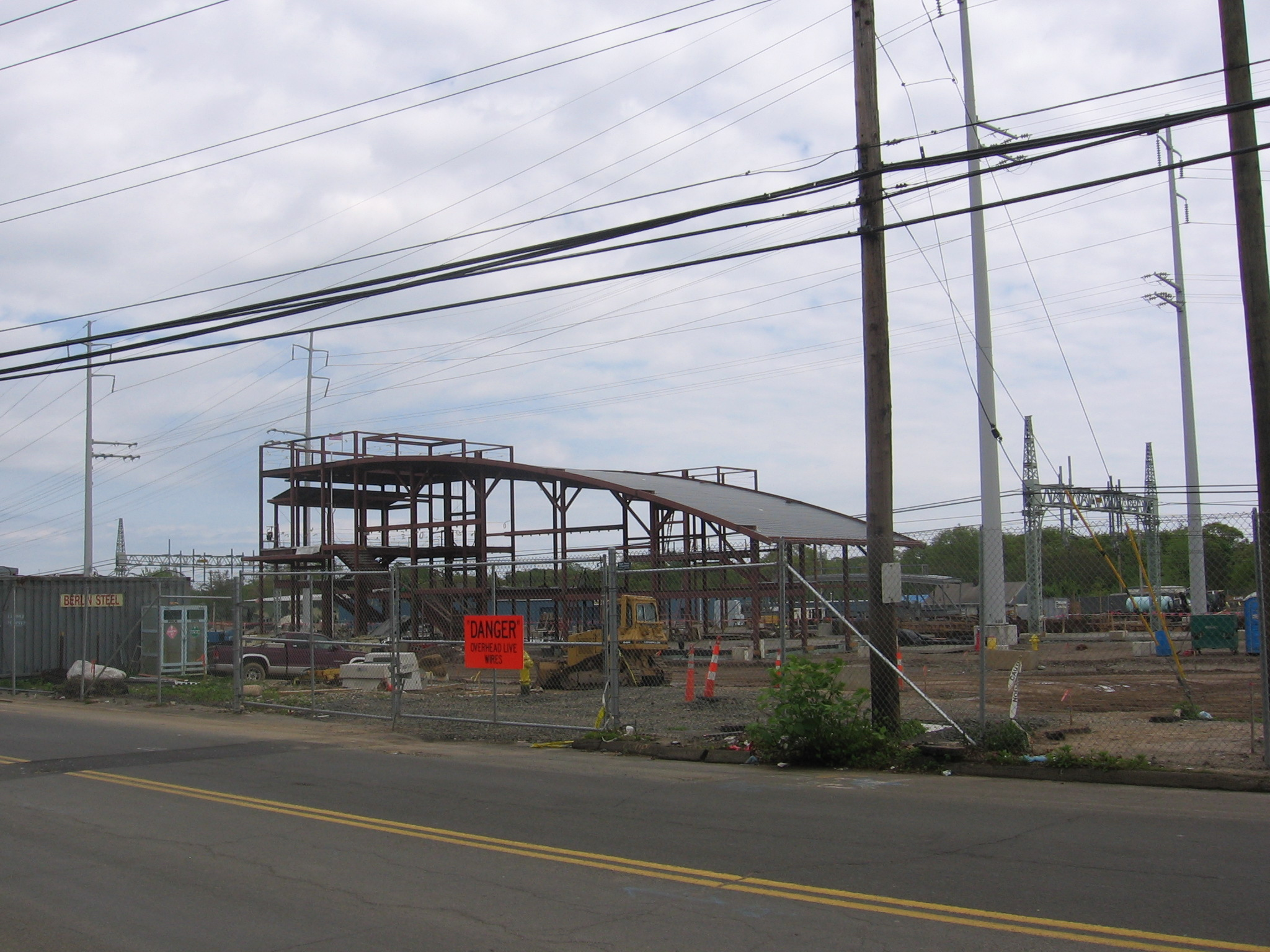
West Haven station under construction in May 2012

In February 2005, the City of West Haven released a proposal for the West Haven station that modified the state's current plan, with less land taking adjacent to the station and a pedestrian bridge across Saw Mill Road to a 629-space garage in the Armonstrong North building. The city's proposal also included transit-oriented development, with a 325-unit residential development on the Armstrong South property and mixed-use buildings along Hood Terrace and Railroad Avenue. On June 19, 2006, West Haven Mayor John M. Picard and U.S. Representative Rosa L. DeLauro announced that DeLauro had secured $1.2 million in federal funding for the project, which brought the federal funding commitment as of that date to $3.2 million. The Final Environmental Impact Statement, released in June 2007, estimated the capital cost for the station at $66.56 million including land acquisitions, with a total of 1,074 parking spaces split between lots and a garage. Ridership was estimated at 1,620 daily riders at opening and 1,955 by 2025, with about 20% new transit users rather than diverted from New Haven or Milford stations.

Design was one-third complete and construction planned for fall 2009 when initial renderings were released in June 2008, with costs estimated at $100 million. The State Bond Commission authorized a $103 million bond for station construction in 2009.

=== Construction and service ===
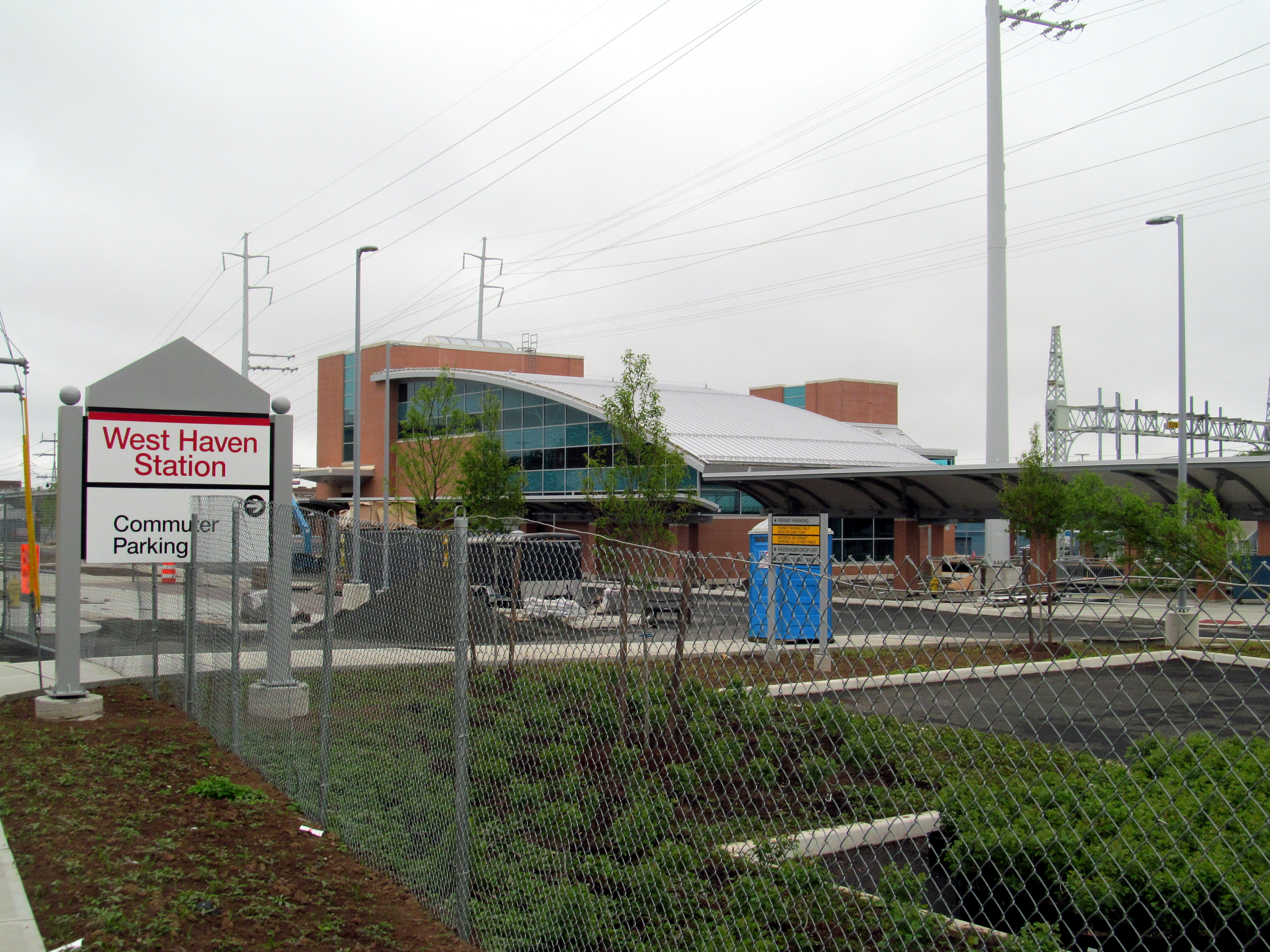
The nearly complete station in May 2013

About 12 miles (19 km) of Track 4 - the southbound outside track - was taken out of service for passenger trains in the mid-1980s to reduce maintenance costs. The track was removed entirely between Devon and Woodmont, and reduced to freight use only between Woodmont and New Haven. The West Haven station project involved restoration of the New Haven Line's original configuration of 4 electrified main tracks in the five-mile (8.0 km) stretch from New Haven to Woodmont, leaving Woodmont to Devon as the only remaining triple-track section of the New Haven Line. The fourth track allows Metro-North local trains to stay exclusively on the outer tracks, leaving the inner tracks for passing Amtrak service and Metro-North expresses. The track restoration and re-electrification represented $33.68 million of the project cost. The restoration used new material, while the old rails and ties were reconditioned for use elsewhere in the state on freight-only and museum trackage.

Groundbreaking was held on November 10, 2010, with the presence of outgoing Governor Jodi Rell. At the time, the station was expected to cost $118 million and open by the end of 2012. After a year of site preparation and foundation work, construction began in earnest in early 2012. In April 2012, the state announced that the station was coming in under budget, with a cost of $80 million plus $25 million in previous property acquisition and design work. The majority of station and building construction was completed by the end of 2012, with primarily electrical, interior finishing, and paving work remaining. In March 2013, as the station neared completion, some of the original station advocates began pushing to use money left over from construction to build a parking garage at the site.

In February 2013, Metro-North proposed to include West Haven in the same fare zone as New Haven Union Station and State Street station. The station was originally to open on June 1, 2013, but these plans were derailed by construction delays and the death of a track worker who was struck by a train in late May. The station ultimately opened on August 18, 2013, with a formal ribbon-cutting the next day.

Shore Line East service at the station was suspended indefinitely on March 16, 2020, due to the coronavirus pandemic. Service resumed on October 7, 2024.
