= Dockside Brewery =

Restaurant and brewery in Connecticut, US

- Interactive map of Dockside Brewery

Restaurant information
- Established: April 19, 2020
- Location: 40 Bridgeport Avenue, Milford, Connecticut, United States
- Coordinates: 41.20029515958499°N 73.10730199873882°W
- Website: https://www.docksidebrewery.com/

Dockside Brewery is a brewery and restaurant that is in the neighborhood of Devon within Milford that was opened during the COVID-19 pandemic.

== Background ==
Dockside is a brewery and restaurant, and brewery located in Devon, which is owned by Dan Bagley and Bob Chicoine.

Julie Nash, Milford's director of economic and community development, has given credit to Dockside Brewery for bringing more people to Devon. Nash has stated, "It [Dockside] brought what Devon needed. Not to say there weren’t great places before them. Bridge House Restaurant has always been a great restaurant. You also have some great hair salons and service there."

During the COVID-19 pandemic, Dockside made several charitable donations to hospitals and charities helping people fighting or affected by COVID-19. Some of these include making donations to the Connecticut Hospitality Employee Relief Fund and donating food to the Bridgeport Hospital.

== History ==
Through a unanimous vote by Milford's Planning and Zoning Board, Dockside Brewery was granted some the permits it needed to begin building in June 2018. The vote followed the success of a petition for the project that reached 850 signatures.

Dockside broke ground in February 2019, after receiving the final permit they needed. On the topic of Dockside Brewery, then-mayor Ben Blake stated “If you look at some of the tourism areas that have had some of the biggest impacts in Connecticut, that has been some of the breweries. I think this one is going to be a flagship one because it’s both a destination by car and a destination by boat.” In January 2020, Dockside hired Andy Schwartz to be their brewmaster.

Dockside officially opened on April 19, 2020. The restaurant originally planned to open on March 23 but, after Governor Ned Lamont closed all restaurants due to the COVID-19 pandemic, they had to delay. Dockside initially had to only allow curbside pickup but sold out of all three of their released beers in their first weekend.

Dockside was burglarized on the night of October 2, 2022. According to the Milford Police Department, the man broke the glass door and entered. The surveillance video showed the man wearing a "black T-shirt and khaki drawstring pants".
