= Milford station (Connecticut) =

Railroad station in Connecticut

Milford
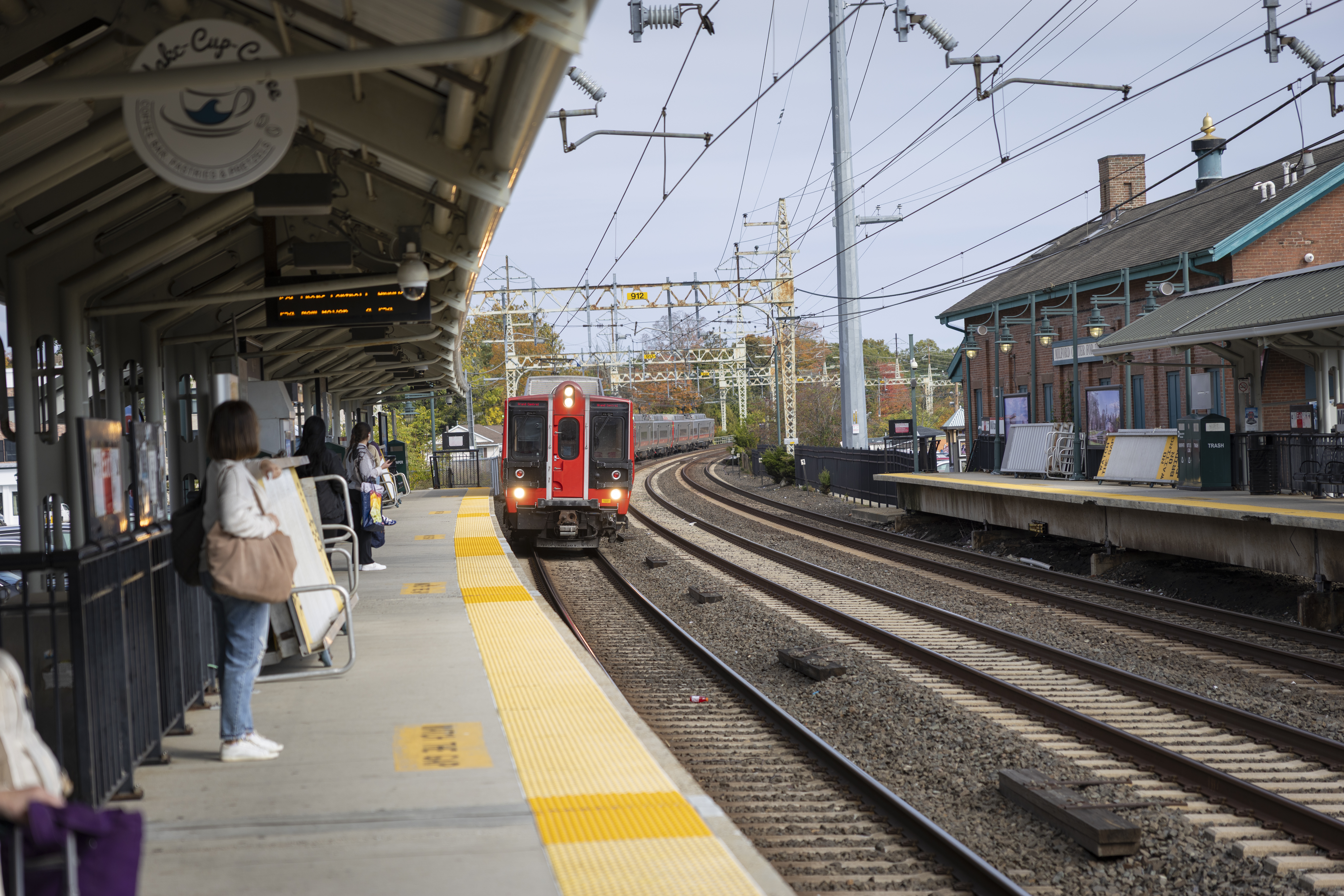
- Milford station in October 2025

General information
- Location: 1 Railroad Avenue; Milford, Connecticut
- Coordinates: 41.222350°N 73.059619°W
- Owner: ConnDOT
- Line: ConnDOT New Haven Line (Northeast Corridor)
- Platforms: 2 side platforms
- Tracks: 3
- Connections: CTTransit New Haven: 271M; Milford Transit: 2, 3, 4, Coastal Link, Milford Commuter Connection - Orange-Milford

Construction
- Parking: 676 spaces

Other information
- Fare zone: 20 (Metro-North)

History
- Opened: December 25, 1848

Passengers
- 2018: 1,508 daily boardings (Metro-North)

Services
Preceding station	CT Rail	Following station
Stratford toward Stamford	Shore Line East limited weekday service	West Haven toward New London
Preceding station	Metro-North Railroad	Following station
Stratford toward Grand Central	New Haven Line	West Haven toward New Haven or New Haven State Street
Former services
Preceding station	New York, New Haven and Hartford Railroad	Following station
Devon toward New York	Main Line	Woodmont toward New Haven
Location

Milford station is a commuter rail station on the Northeast Corridor in Milford, Connecticut. It is served by the Metro-North Railroad New Haven Line plus limited CT Rail Shore Line East service.

== Station layout ==
The station has two high-level side platforms. The northern platform, adjacent to Track 1, is four cars long and generally used by westbound trains. The southern platform, adjacent to Track 4, is 10 cars long and generally used by eastbound trains. The New Haven Line has three tracks at this location. The inner track, not adjacent to either platform, is used only by express trains. Milford is the only station on the New Haven Line with only three tracks. The Northeast Corridor Commission identified restoring the fourth track in Milford as a priority in a 2021 report.

The station has 676 parking spaces, 444 of which are owned by the state.

== History ==
The station opened on December 25, 1848. The brick south (eastbound) station building was constructed around 1881. It is similar to other stations constructed by the New York, New Haven and Hartford Railroad at Fairfield and Southport. The wooden westbound (north) building was constructed in 1896 when the line was quadruple-tracked. The station agent was eliminated by Penn Central on January 15, 1972.

Shore Line East service at the station was suspended indefinitely on March 16, 2020, due to the coronavirus pandemic. Service resumed on October 7, 2024.
