= Norwalk Transit District =

Public transportation provider

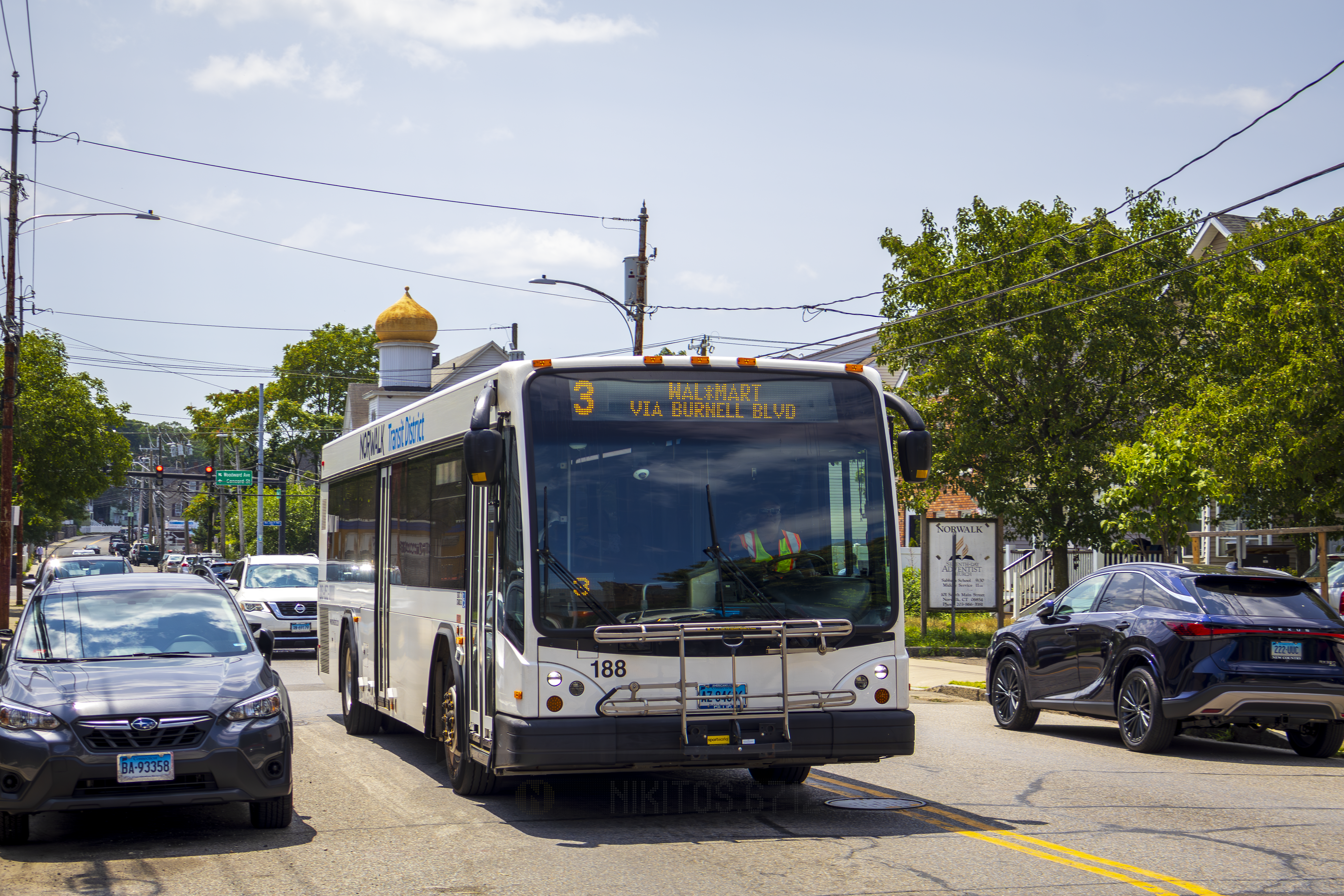
- Norwalk Transit District bus 188 on Route 3
- Founded: 1978
- Headquarters: 275 Wilson Avenue; Norwalk, CT 06854
- Locale: Southwestern Connecticut
- Service area: Norwalk, Westport, Greenwich, Stamford and nearby communities
- Service type: Local bus service
- Routes: Local fixed route, paratransit and microtransit services in Norwalk, Greenwich, Stamford, Wilton and Westport, CT, and regional connections to Stamford, Danbury, Bridgeport, and Milford, CT
- Hubs: Norwalk Hub (for Norwalk Fixed Route) South Norwalk Railroad Station, East Norwalk Railroad Station (Norwalk Fixed Route), Westport Railroad Station, Greens Farms Railroad Station (Westport microtransit), Greenwich Railroad Station (Greenwich microtransit)
- Fleet: 79
- Daily ridership: 2023: 5,610 (Weekday); 1,769 (Saturday); 837 (Sunday)
- Operator: Norwalk Transit District
- Chief executive: Matthew Pentz (Chief Executive Officer)
- Website: www.norwalktransit.com

The Norwalk Transit District is the primary provider of public transportation services in Norwalk, Connecticut, United States, and surrounding communities. The local Norwalk fixed-route bus transit system, is the primary service of the district linking Norwalk and its immediate suburbs. The agency also operates regional bus service as far east as Milford (with Milford Transit District and GBT) and provides connections to Metro-North stations.

Wheels2U microtransit services operate in Norwalk, Greenwich and Westport.

Paratransit door-to-door services are available for residents in the service area unable to use regular transit services or, on a limited basis, are age 65 or older. Norwalk Transit contracts with local transportation service providers to perform some of the door-to-door services, and is also the provider of public transit for the Westport Transit District.

The city of Norwalk founded the Norwalk Transit District in 1978, seven years after the Connecticut Company ceased operations in Norwalk outside of their route linking Norwalk to Stamford (which continues as Connecticut Transit Stamford Route 341). It was a pioneer in the operation of microtransit in Connecticut, with services rolling out in 2018 and expanding in 2024. The district receives municipal, state (Connecticut Department of Transportation) and federal (Federal Transit Administration) funding.

== Routes ==
Norwalk Transit operates public bus services throughout Norwalk, Westport and Greenwich, CT. A streamlined route structure was rolled out in August 2025 after completion of a long-term transit study.

A modified hub and spoke service model allows for transfers between routes at the Burnell Blvd. bus hub in downtown Norwalk as well as the South Norwalk and East Norwalk MTA Metro-North train stations. To facilitate transfers between local Norwalk routes and regional connections such as CTTransit Route 341, passengers on WHEELS routes 1 and 2 can transfer in shared service areas along U.S. Route 1. Fares as of 2025 are $1.75 (US) for 90-minute unlimited rides as well as other pass and contactless fare options.

=== Norwalk Bus Routes ===
there are seven fixed route services, running primarily in the city limits of Norwalk with one route extending to Wilton.

- 1: NCC-East Norwalk Station
- 2: NCC-Woodward Avenue/Dock
- 3: Walmart-South Norwalk Station
- 4: Norwalk High School-South Norwalk Station
- 5: Highland Avenue-Burnell Boulevard/Wall Street
- 6: Ponus Avenue-Norwalk High School
- 7: Wilton Center-South Norwalk Station
- Routes 1-3 operate 7 days per week with service frequencies of between 15 and 30 minutes weekdays and 30 minutes on weekends. Service span is approximately 5AM-11PM weekdays, 6AM-11PM Saturday and 8AM-8PM Sunday.
- Route 4 operates Monday-Saturday with hourly frequencies. Service span is 6AM-8PM weekdays and 6AM-7PM Saturday.
- Route 5 operates Monday-Friday every half hour from 6AM to 6PM
- Route 6 operates Monday-Friday with hourly frequencies from 6AM to 7:30PM
- Route 7 operates Monday-Friday with 15 minute frequencies in the peak, 30 minutes off peak from 6AM to 7:30PM

=== Regional connections ===
- Route 7 Link: Danbury-Norwalk via Route 7 . Operated by Housatonic Area Regional Transit (HARTransit). Formerly a joint route operated by both HARTransit and the Norwalk Transit District.
- Coastal Link: Norwalk to Milford via Route 1. This route is operated by Norwalk Transit District in partnership with Greater Bridgeport Transit and Milford Transit District.
- Transfers with CT Transit Route 341 at the WHEELS Hub

=== Wheels 2U ===
Wheels 2U is a microtransit ridesharing service operated with small vehicles. The ride is booked and the $2 fare ($6 for groups) is paid through an app similar to that used by Uber or Lyft.

- Wheels 2U Norwalk is available to any origin or destination within the City of Norwalk. Service operates Monday - Wednesday 7am - 7pm, Thursday-Friday 7am - 11pm, Saturday 1pm - 12am, and Sunday 1pm - 9pm.
- Wheels2U Westport is available to and from Westport residential and commercial areas and the Saugatuck and Greens Farms MTA Metro-North Railroad Stations. Service operated weekdays 5:45am - 10am and 4pm - 9:30pm.
- Wheels2U Greenwich is available to and from the Greenwich MTA Metro-North Railroad Station and the central business district of Greenwich. Service is operated weekdays 6am - 9:30am and 4:30pm - 8pm.

=== Door-to-door services ===
Norwalk Transit directly operates and contracts with a number of local operators to provide Complementary ADA Paratransit (for its own fixed route services and CTtransit Stamford) and Senior dial-a-ride services. These programs operate in Darien, Greenwich, Norwalk, Stamford, Westport and Wilton as well as portions of NY State.
