= Walnut Beach =

Beach in Milford, Connecticut, United States

Coordinates: 41.1957937824144°N 73.077548833342°W

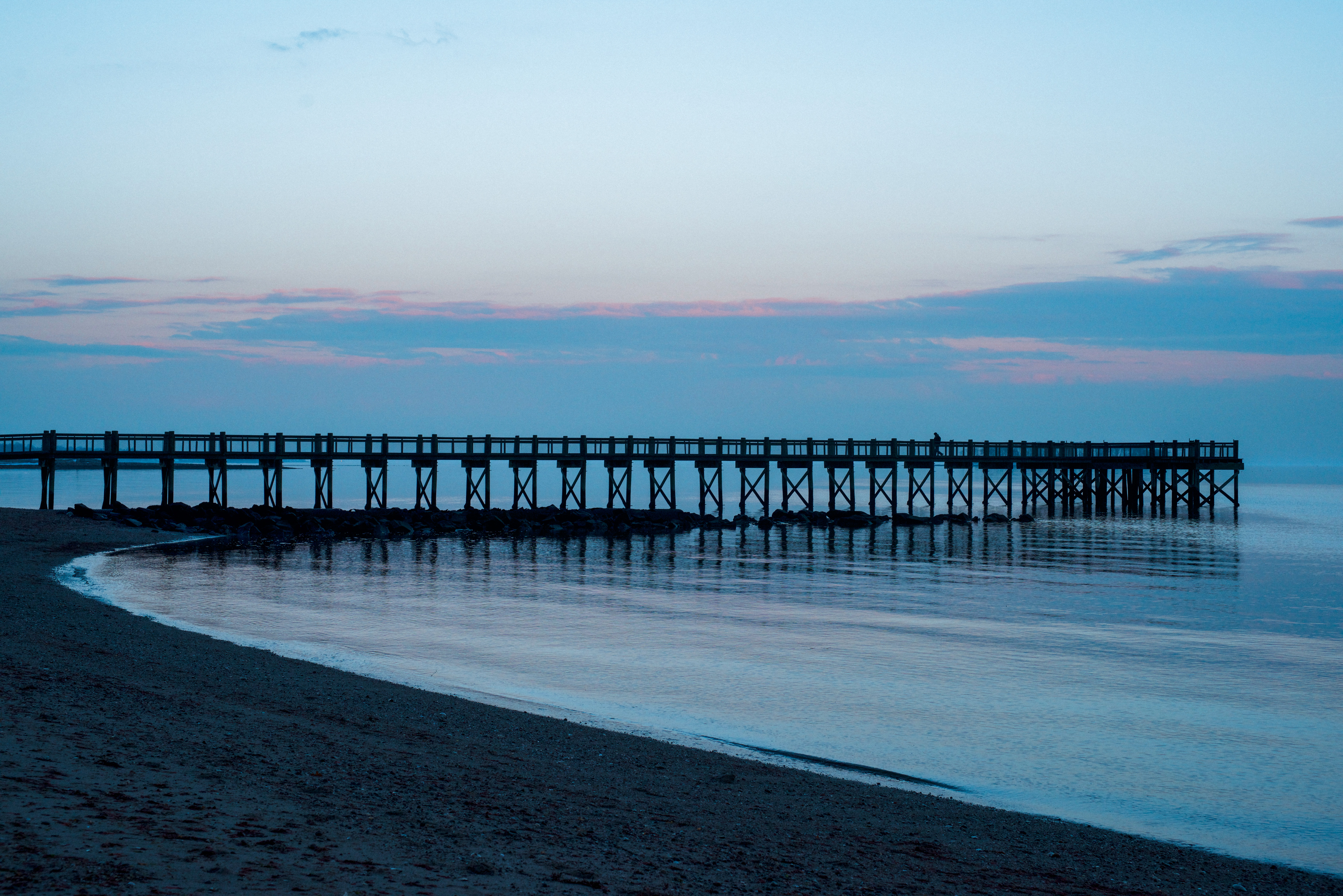
Fishing pier at Walnut Beach

Walnut Beach is a town beach and surrounding neighborhood located in Milford, Connecticut and was formerly the site of an amusement park. A boardwalk along the shoreline connects to the beach at Silver Sands State Park to the east and Charles Island.

== History ==
In 1923, an amusement park was built at Walnut Beach by the Whitham brothers. A dance hall and a boxing arena drew thousands in the summer. In 1938, a hurricane destroyed many of the rides. The park continued into the 1940s and was refurbished in the 1950s by Frank and Les Smith. Subsequent redevelopment brought an end to the park.

== Climate ==
In the summer months, Walnut Beach can reach highs into the upper 90°F. Walnut Beach has a record high temperature of 103°F in the month of July. The coldest day on record was -7°F in the month of January.
