= Milford, Connecticut =

City in Connecticut, United States

- City
- City of Milford
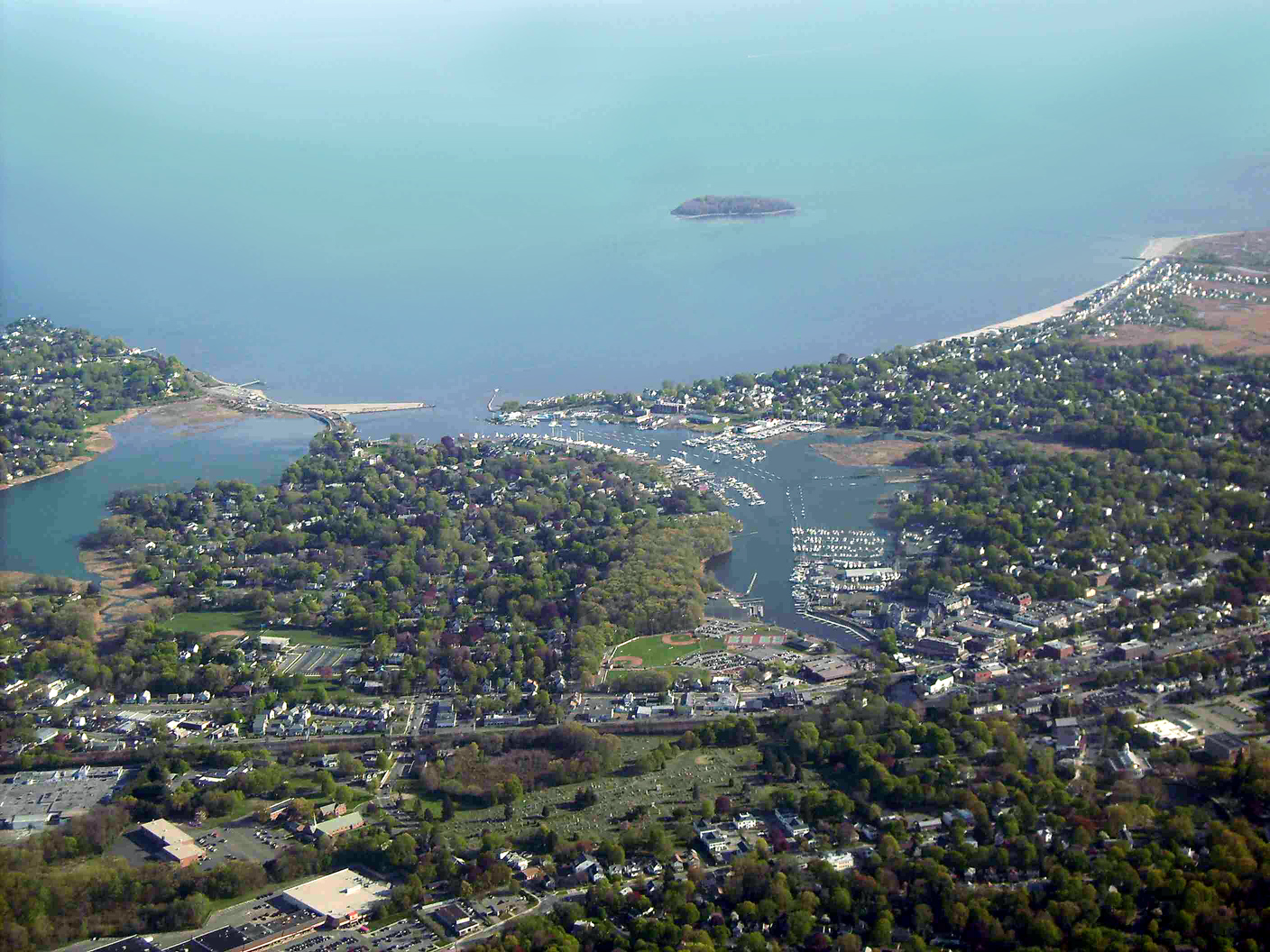
- Aerial view of Milford city center and harbor

- Flag Seal
- Etymology: Ford by a mill
- Nickname: Sleepy Hollow
- Motto: A Small City with a Big Heart!
- Interactive map of Milford, Connecticut
- Coordinates: 41°13′27″N 73°03′35″W
- Country: United States
- U.S. state: Connecticut
- County: New Haven
- Region: South Central CT
- Settled: 1639; 387 years ago
- Incorporated (city): 1959; 67 years ago
- Named for: Milford, Surrey

Government
  - Type: Mayor–Board of Aldermen
  - Mayor: Richard Smith (D)

Area
  - Total: 25.13 sq mi (65.09 km^{2})
  - Land: 21.90 sq mi (56.73 km^{2})
  - Water: 3.22 sq mi (8.35 km^{2})

Population (2020)
  - Total: 50,558
  - Density: 2,308/sq mi (891.2/km^{2})
- United States Census 2010, United States Census Bureau
- Time zone: UTC−5 (Eastern)
  - Summer (DST): UTC−4 (Eastern)
- ZIP Codes: 06460, 06461
- Area codes: 203/475
- FIPS code: 09-47515
- GNIS feature ID: 0208882
- Website: www.milfordct.us

Milford is a coastal city in New Haven County, Connecticut, United States, between New Haven and Bridgeport. The population was 50,558 at the 2020 United States Census. The city includes the village of Devon and the borough of Woodmont. Milford is part of the South Central Connecticut Planning Region.

== History ==
=== Early history ===
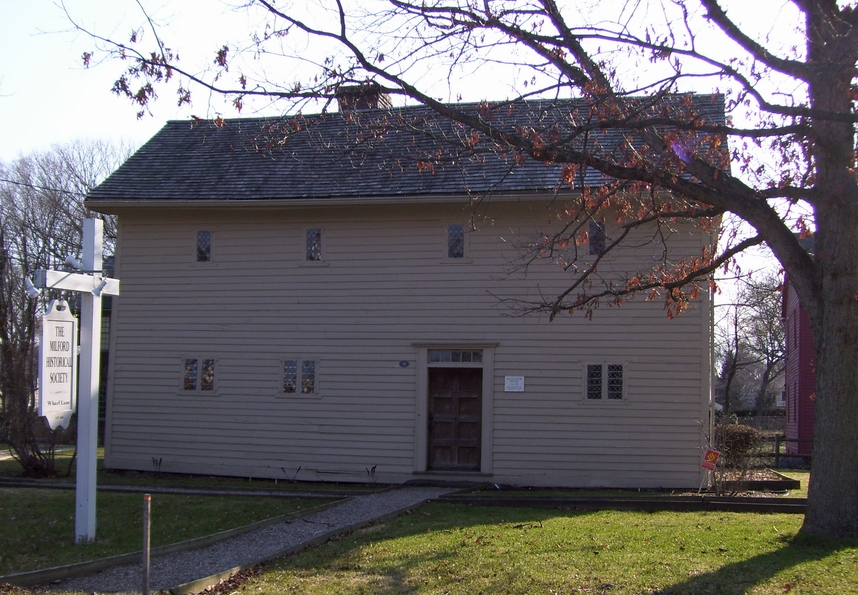
The Eells-Stow House, c. 1700, is believed to be the oldest extant house in Milford.

When the English first encountered the territory, the Paugussett (an Algonquian-speaking tribe) predominated. English colonists affiliated with the contemporary New Haven Colony purchased land which today comprises Milford, Orange, and West Haven on February 1, 1639, from Ansantawae, chief of the local Paugusset. They knew the area as Wepawaug, named for the small river which runs through the town. The English built a grist mill by the Wepawaug River in 1640. Streets in Milford and Orange were later named "Wepawaug".

During the Revolutionary War, the Milford section of the Boston Post Road, a vital route connecting Boston, New York, and other major coastal cities, was blockaded by Continental forces. Fort Trumbull was constructed to protect the town. The Liberty Rock monument commemorates the site of the blockade.

By 1822, the town had grown large enough that residents in Milford's northern and eastern sections chartered the Town of Orange. During the next century and a half, the remaining section of Milford was known for shipbuilding, farming, and oystering. Industrial facilities were also developed.

Because of its location on Long Island Sound, Milford became a beach resort for residents of New Haven and Bridgeport in the latter 19th century.

In 1899, the "Memorial Bridge" (a "stone bridge and tower commemorating the town's history and founders") replaced the last mill over the Wepawaug, which had closed in 1894. The bridge was described as "simple in design, its broad copings surmounted with rough hewn blocks of granite, bearing the names of the first settlers. There are ten blocks on the south and twenty on the north coping. At each end of the former is a stone four feet wide by five and a half high." It is located where Broad Street crosses the Wepawaug River.

In 1903, the southeastern portion of the town was incorporated as the Borough of Woodmont. In 1959, the Town of Milford, including the Borough of Woodmont, was incorporated as the City of Milford.

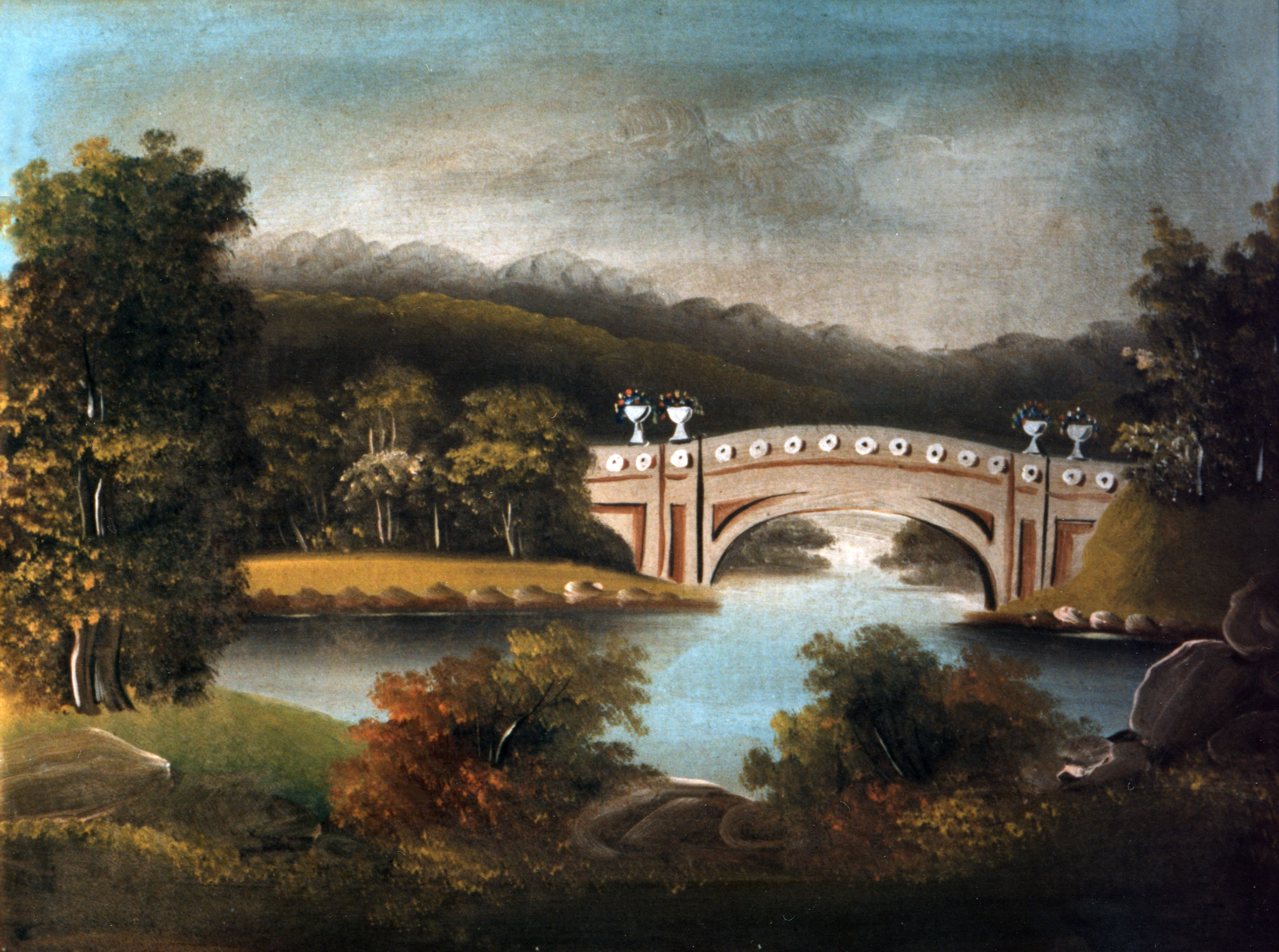
View of Milford's greens on a 19th-century naïve landscape painting

=== Towns created from Milford ===
Milford was one of the early settlements in south central Connecticut and, over time, gave rise to several new towns that broke off and incorporated separately. The following is a list of towns created from parts of Milford.

- Woodbridge in 1784 (also partly from New Haven)
  - Bethany, created from Woodbridge in 1832
- Orange (originally North Milford) in 1822 (also partly from New Haven)
  - West Haven, created from Orange in 1921

=== The "oatmeal lots" of Liberty Park ===
Starting in 1902, Quaker Oats oatmeal boxes came with a coupon redeemable for the legal deed to a tiny lot in Milford. The lots, sometimes as small as 10 feet (3 m) by 10 feet, were carved out of a 15-acre (6.1 ha) tract in a never-built subdivision called "Liberty Park". A small number of children (or their parents), often residents living near Milford, collected the deeds and started paying the extremely small property taxes on the "oatmeal lots". The developer of the prospective subdivision hoped the landowners would hire him to build homes on the lots, although several lots would need to be combined before building could start. Since the subdivision into small lots predated Milford's planning and zoning regulations, the deeds were entirely legal, although they created a large amount of paperwork for town tax collectors, who frequently couldn't find the property owners and received almost no tax revenue from the lots.

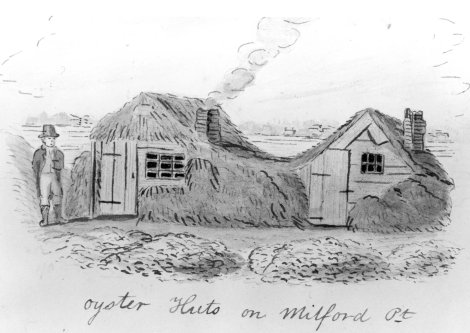
Oyster Huts on Milford Point, a sketch by John Warner Barber for his Historical Collections of Connecticut (1836). Barber wrote that he found 15 or 20 of these seaweed-covered huts along the shore when he visited the town in 1836.

In the mid-1970s, when the town wanted to develop the area, town officials put an end to the oatmeal lots in a "general foreclosure" that avoided the enormous expense of individual foreclosures by condemning nearly all of the property in one legal filing. One of the streets in the Liberty Park subdivision plans, Shelland Street, was later built in the late 1990s as an access road to the Milford Power Company. The site is currently home to the Bic Corporation's lighter factory at 565 Bic Drive.

In a separate land giveaway in 1955 tied to the Sergeant Preston of the Yukon television show, Quaker Oats offered in its Puffed Wheat and Puffed Rice cereal boxes genuine deeds to land in the Klondike.

=== Post-World War II development ===
In the post-World War II period, Milford—like many Connecticut towns—underwent significant suburbanization. Interstate 95 was routed through the city, and the Milford section was completed in 1958.

The 1960s and 1970s witnessed the construction of the Connecticut Post Mall, one of the state's largest shopping malls, and the extensive commercial development of the town's stretch of the Boston Post Road. One notable small business located on the Boston Post Road during the 1970s was SCELBI Computer Consulting, credited by many as being the world's first personal-computer manufacturer. Starting in 1975, the city began hosting the Milford Oyster Festival, which has since become firmly established as an annual Milford tradition that is held "rain or shine".

The city became host to several headquarters of multinational corporations, including the Schick Shaving company, and Doctor's Associates, Inc., owners of the Subway chain of fast-food restaurants. The US operations of BIC were headquartered in Milford, but in March 2008 moved most of its operations to Shelton. Milford Hospital has also developed into an important health care resource for the area.

== Demographics ==
Historical population
Census	Pop.	Note	%±
1790	2,098		—
1800	2,417		15.2%
1810	674		−72.1%
1820	2,785		313.2%
1830	2,256		−19.0%
1840	2,455		8.8%
1850	2,465		0.4%
1860	2,828		14.7%
1870	3,405		20.4%
1880	3,347		−1.7%
1890	3,811		13.9%
1900	3,783		−0.7%
1910	4,366		15.4%
1920	10,193		133.5%
1930	12,660		24.2%
1940	16,439		29.8%
1950	26,870		63.5%
1960	41,662		55.1%
1970	50,858		22.1%
1980	50,898		0.1%
1990	49,938		−1.9%
2000	52,212		4.6%
2010	52,759		1.0%
2020	50,558		−4.2%

According to the 2010 US census Demographic Profile Data, there were 51,271 people living in 21,017 housing units of which 13,534 were counted as family households. The population density was 2,341/sq mi (904/km2). The average density of housing units was 1,017.7 per square mile. The racial makeup of Milford was 93.55% White, 1.91% African American, 0.13% Native American, 2.36% Asian, 0.03% Pacific Islander, 0.88% from other races, and 1.14% from two or more races. Hispanic or Latino people of any race were 3.34% of the population.

Of the aforementioned households 29.3% had children under the age of 18 living with them, 54.7% were married couples living together, 9.7% had a female householder with no husband present, and 32.4% were non-families. 26.3% of all households were made up of individuals, and 10.3% had someone living alone who was 65 years of age or older. The average household size was 2.49 and the average family size was 3.04.

(In Milford the population was 22.4% under the age of 18, 5.9% from 18 to 24, 31.7% from 25 to 44, 25.0% from 45 to 64, and 14.9% who were 65 years of age or older. The median age was 39 years. For every 100 females, there were 93.6 males. For every 100 females age 18 and over, there were 90.0 males.)

As of the 2000 census, the median income for a household was $61,183. The per capita income was $28,773. About 2.4% of families and 3.8% of the population were below the poverty line, including 4.1% of those under age 18 and 5.4% of those age 65 or over.

The Census Bureau's 2010–2012 American Community Survey showed that (in 2012 inflation-adjusted dollars) median household income was $77,925 and the median family income was $93,697. Year-round male workers had a median income of $67,631 versus $59,992 for females. The per capita income for the city was $38,560.

== Gallery ==
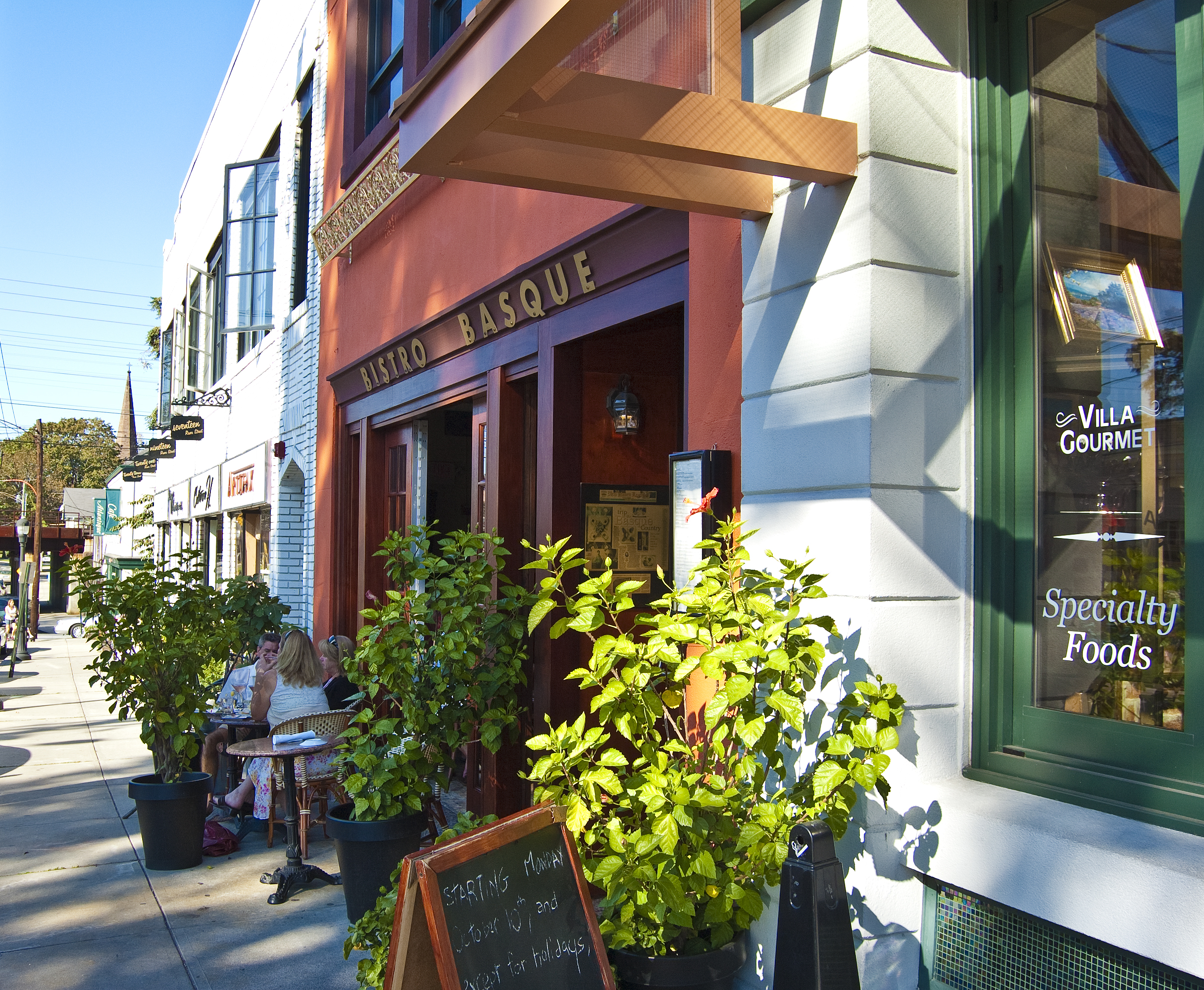
River Street in Downtown Milford

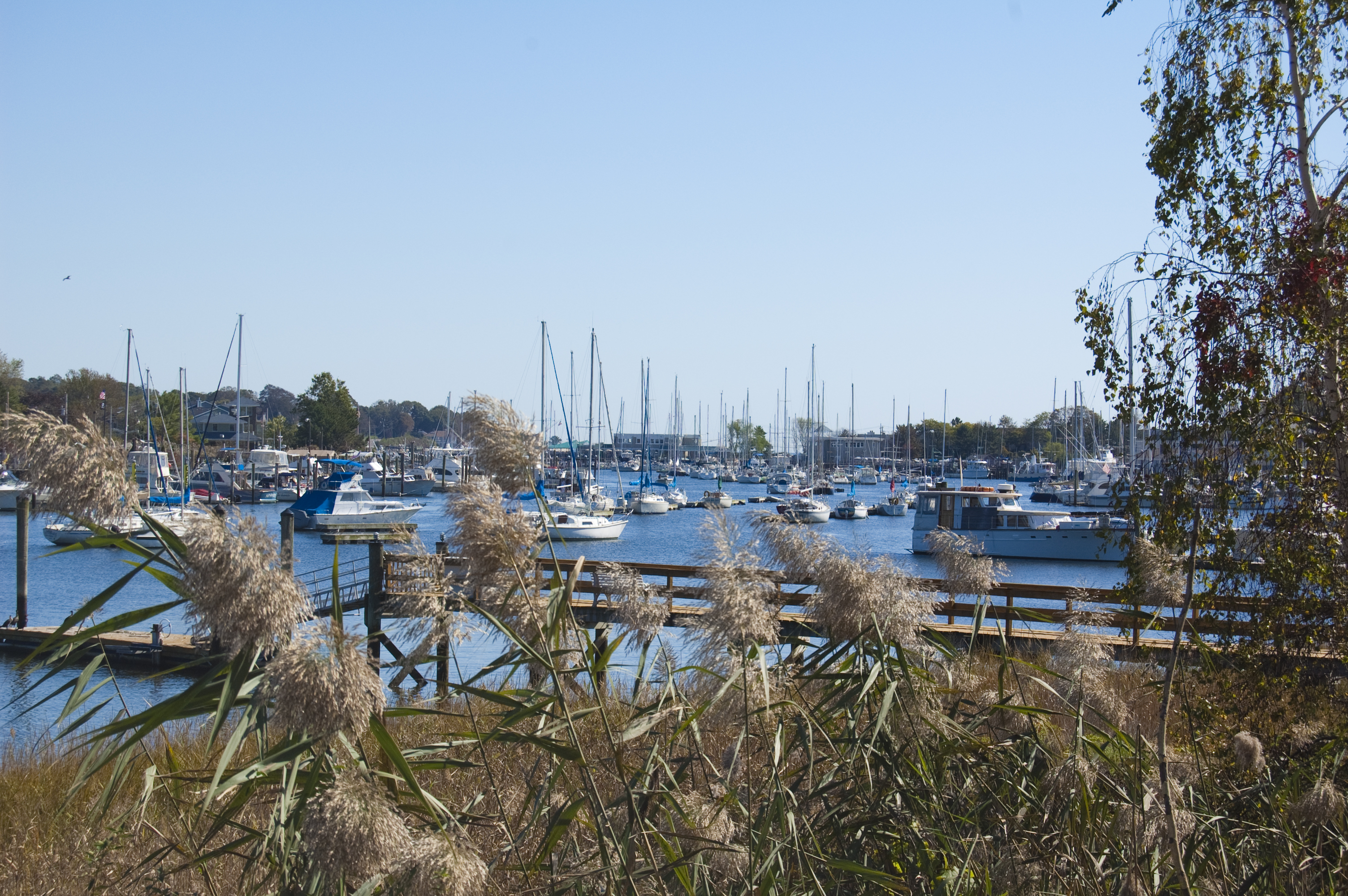
Milford Harbor seen from Pond Street

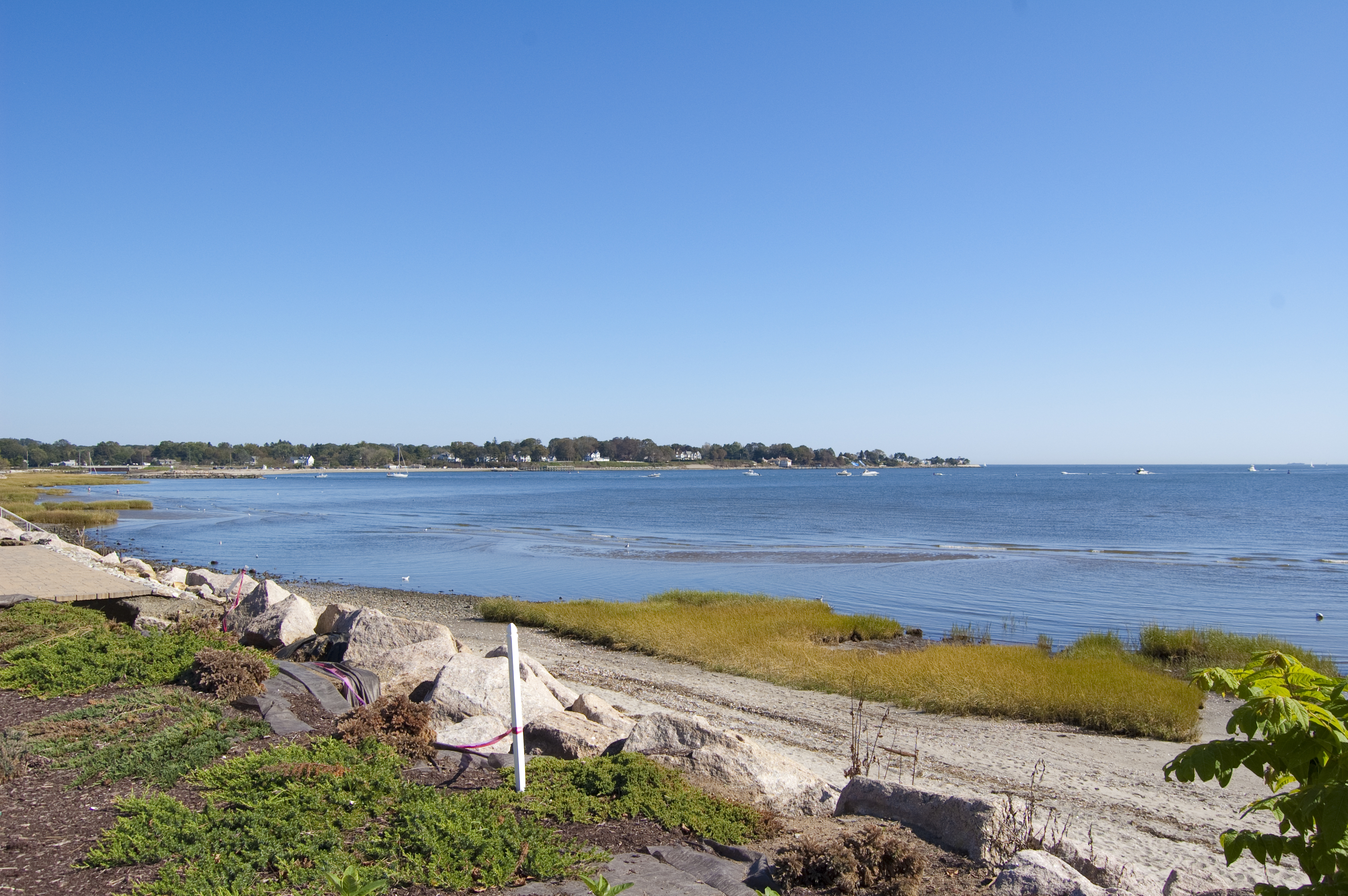
View of coastline from Fort Trumbull Beach, with Gulf Beach in distance

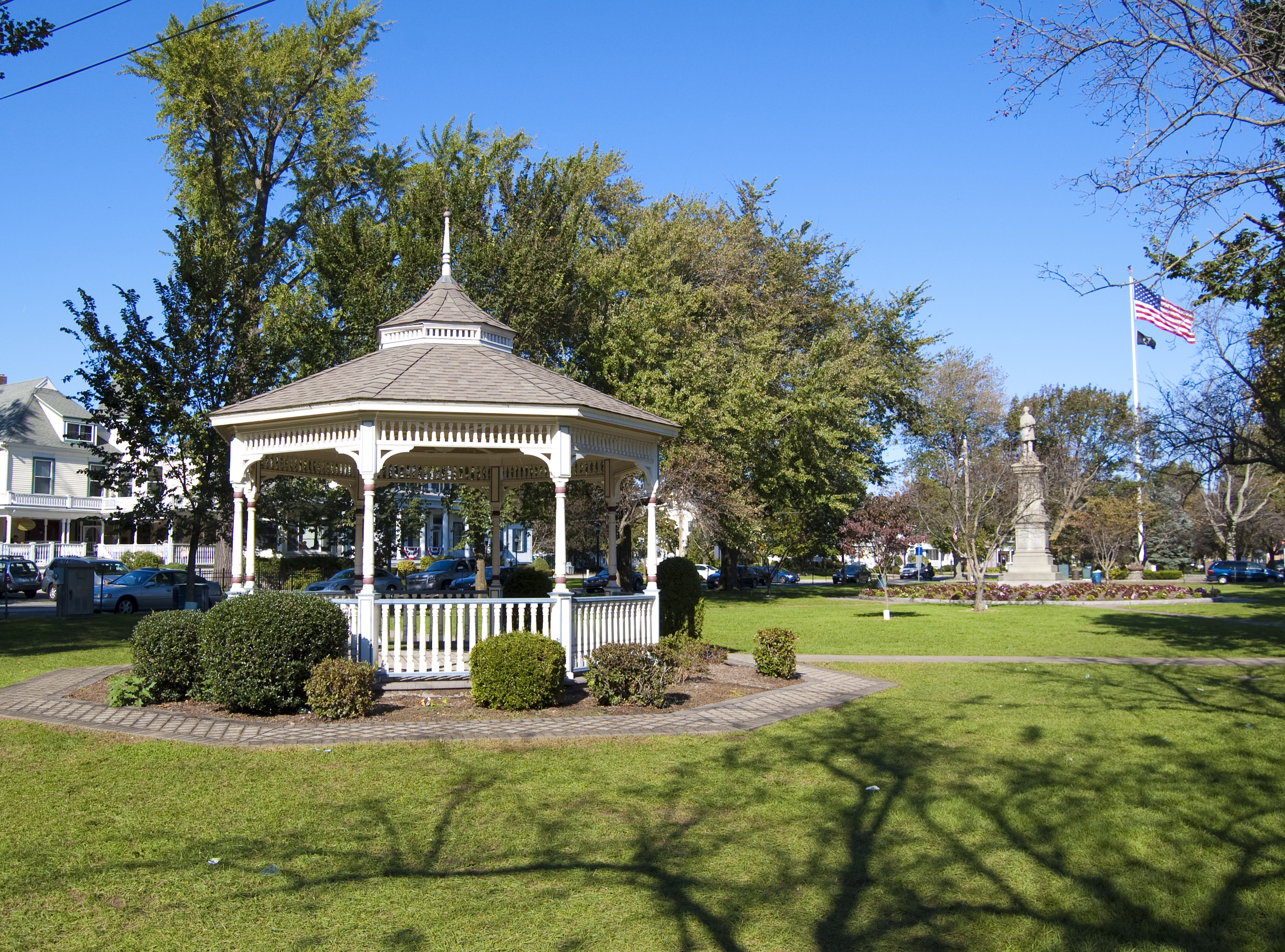
Milford Green, the first longest green in New England

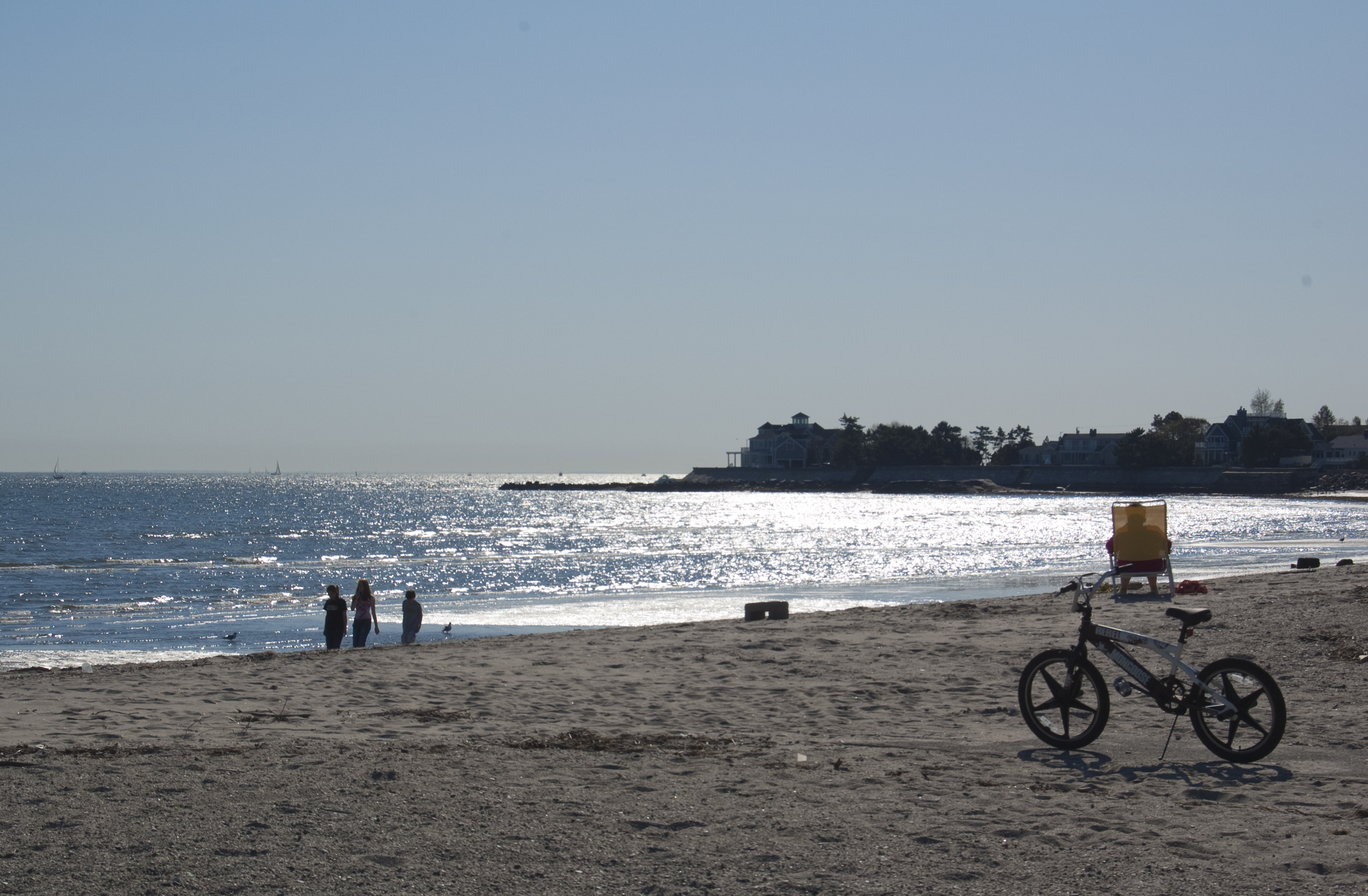
View of Long Island Sound from a Milford Beach

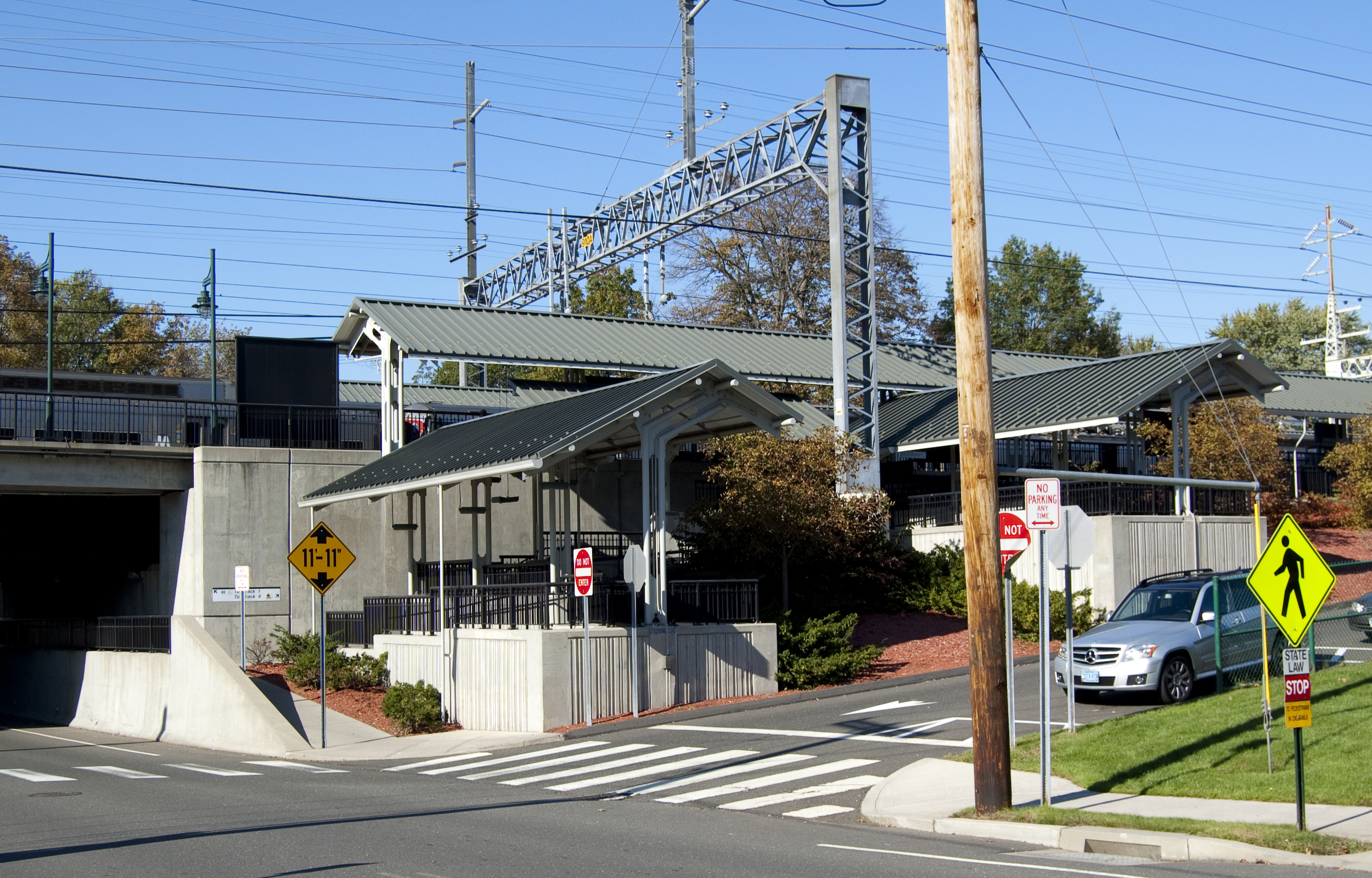
The Milford Metro North Rail Station

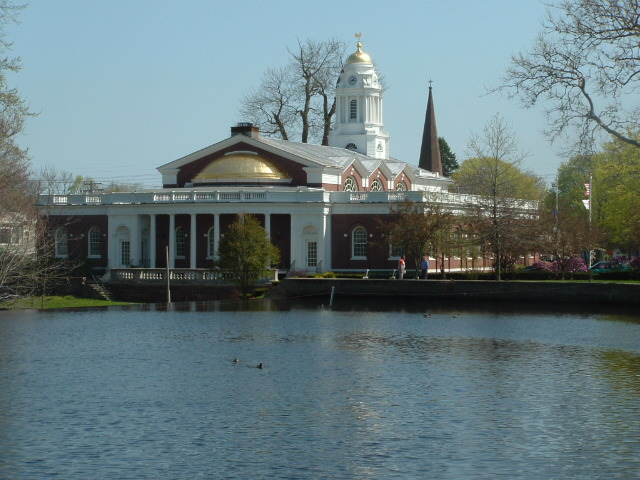
Milford City Hall

Silver Sands Beach at sunset in Milford

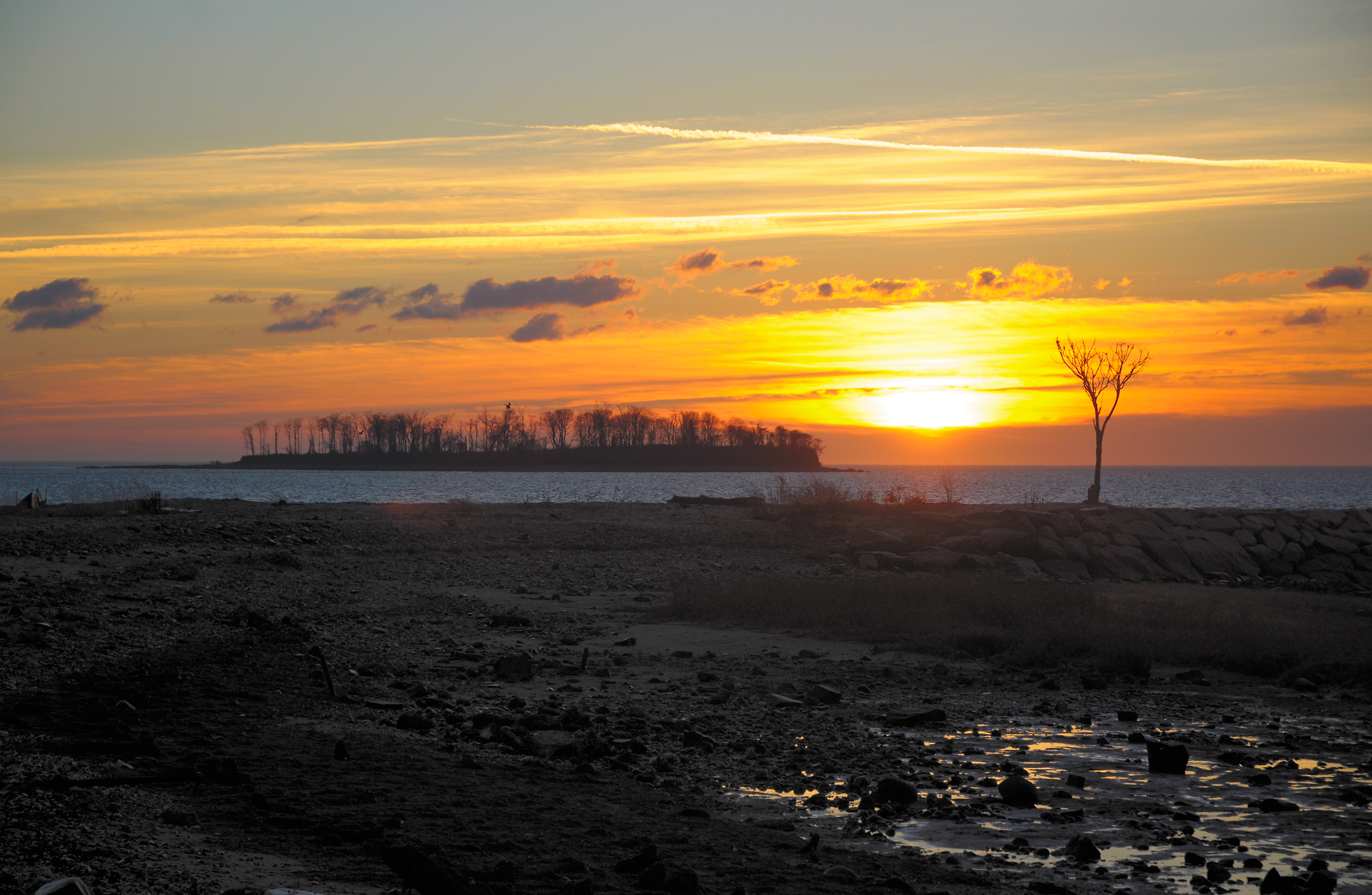
Charles Island, Sunrise at Silver Beach

== Government ==
Government in the city is set up with the mayor as chief executive and the Board of Aldermen as a legislative body. The mayor is permitted to propose legislation to the Board of Aldermen and introduces the city budget, but possesses no veto power over what the Aldermen chooses to pass.

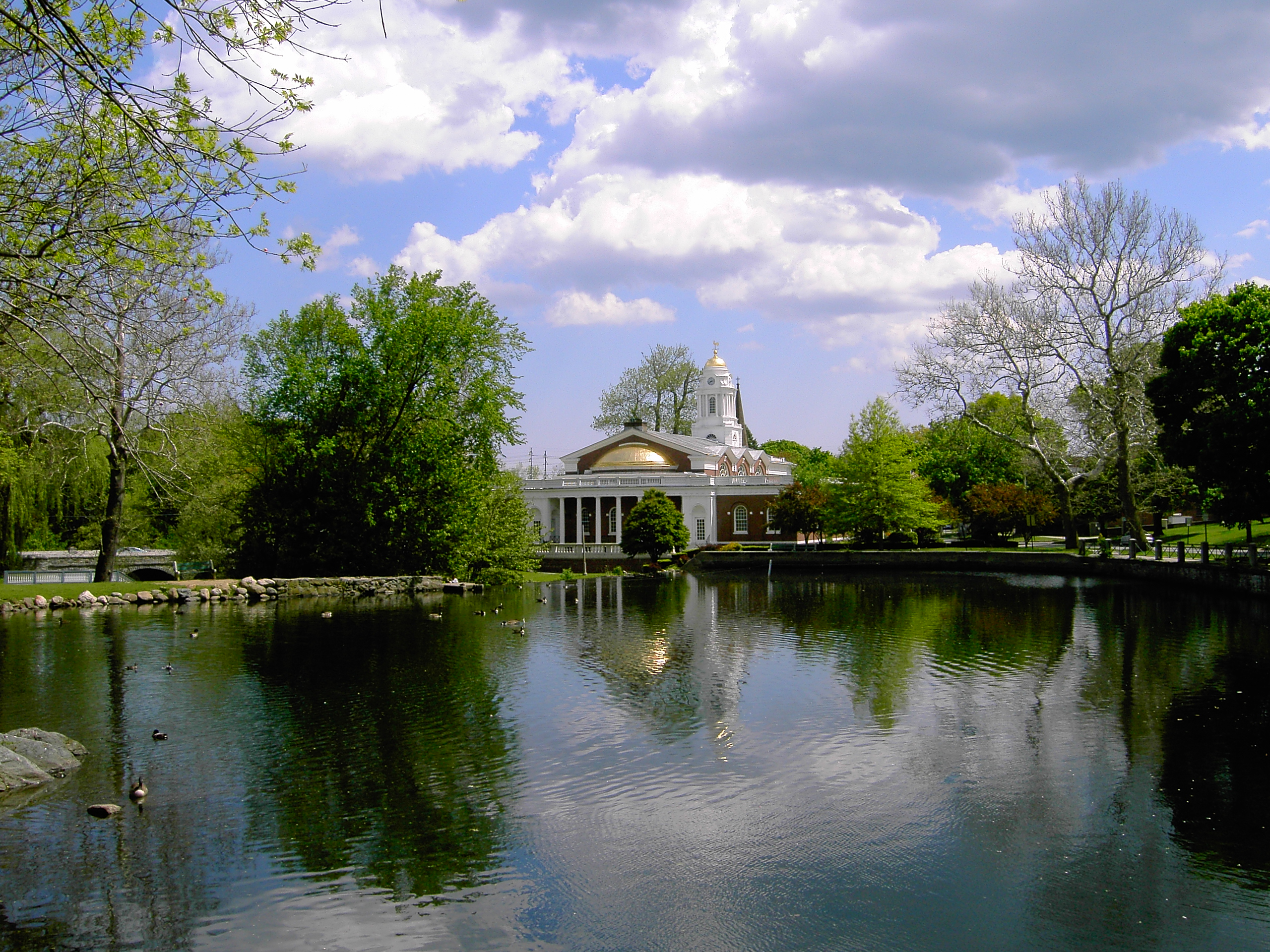
Milford's city hall, the fifth building to occupy the site

=== Elected positions ===
The following is a list of city government positions elected by city residents and the terms thereof:

- Mayor: The mayor is the city's chief executive and is elected in odd-numbered years. The mayor receives compensation for his or her services.
- Board of Aldermen: The Board of Aldermen consists of 15 members elected in odd-numbered years, three from each of the city's five political districts. Per City Charter requirements, only two of the three aldermen elected from each district may be from one political party to allow for minority representation on the board; voters are permitted to vote for any three aldermen in their district. Members of the Board of Aldermen receive no compensation for their services.
- Board of Education: The Board of Education deals with educational matters in the city and consists of 10 members elected in odd-numbered years, two from each of the city's five political districts. Members receive no compensation for their services.
- Planning & Zoning Board: The Planning & Zoning Board deals with development and land use issues and consists of 10 members, two from each of the city's five political districts. Members serve a four-year term, with one of the two members of each political district up for election during each odd-numbered year's election cycle, ensuring that no more than half of the board is made up of new members at the start of a new session. Members of the Planning & Zoning Board receive no compensation for their services.
- City Clerk: The city clerk is elected in odd-numbered years and receives a compensation for services provided.
- Constables: Seven constables are elected in odd-numbered years, though individual voters are only permitted to vote for any four of their choosing on the ballot. They are compensated on a case-by-case basis.
- Registrars of Voters: Pursuant to Connecticut state law, each town must have a Republican and Democratic registrar of voters to serve as election administrators, though an additional third party registrar is permitted if they receive more votes than either of the major parties' registrar. Registrars in Milford are elected to two-year terms, their election taking place during each even-year state election cycle. Registrars are compensated for their services. Voters may only vote for one choice for registrar.

=== List of mayors ===
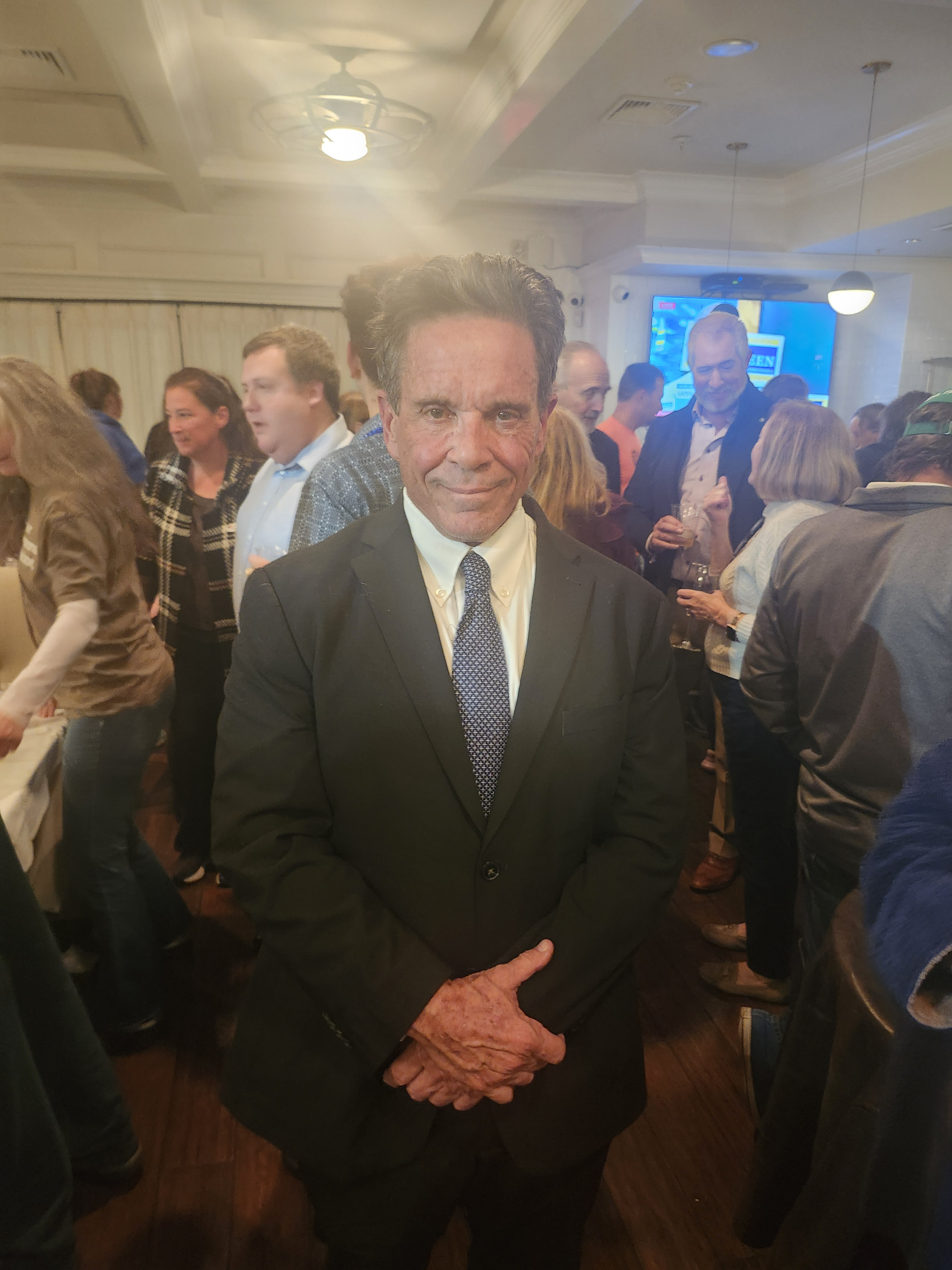
Richard Smith (depicted above) beat Tony Giannattasio in the 2025 Milford municipal election.

After becoming incorporated as a city in 1959, the city reformed its system of government by establishing a mayor–board of aldermen format. It elected its first mayor, Charles Iovino, the incumbent city manager under Milford's previous form of government, on November 3, 1959.

#	Name	In office	Political party
1	Charles Iovino	1959–1963	Independent
2	Alan Jepson	1963–1969	Democratic
3	Edward Kozlowski	1969–1971	Republican
4	Clifton Moore	1971–1973	Republican
5	Joel Baldwin	1973–1977	Democratic
6	Henry Povinelli	1977–1981	Republican
7	Alberta Jagoe	1981–1989	Democratic
8	Frederick L. Lisman	1989–2001	Republican
9	James L. Richetelli, Jr.	2001–2011	Republican
10	Benjamin G. Blake	2011–2023	Democratic
11/13	Richard Smith	2023/2025–Present	Democratic
12	Tony Giannattasio	2023–2025	Republican

=== Registered voters ===
Voter registration and party enrollment as of November, 01 2017
Party	Active voters	Inactive voters	Total voters	Percentage	Change since 2015
Democratic	10,319	405	10,724	28.5%	+15.6%
Republican	8,166	248	8,414	22.4%	+18.6%
Unaffiliated	17,256	606	17,862	47.5%	+6.3%
Total	36,309	1,274	37,583	100%	+12.0%

== Education ==
Milford Public Schools currently operates eight elementary schools, three middle schools, two high schools, and one alternative education high school. There are also a number of private schools in the city.

=== Public ===
- The Academy
- Calf Pen Meadow Elementary School
- East Shore Middle School
- Harborside Middle School
- John F. Kennedy Elementary School
- Jonathan Law High School
- Joseph A. Foran High School
- Platt Technical High School
- Live Oaks Elementary School
- Mathewson Elementary School
- Meadowside Elementary School
- Orange Avenue Elementary School
- Orchard Hills Elementary School
- Pumpkin Delight Elementary School
- West Shore Middle School

Milford High School operated for 141 years at the time of its closing in June 1983. It was the first public high school to operate in Milford, beginning in 1842. The former Milford High School building is now the Parson's Government building.

=== Private schools ===
- Academy of Our Lady of Mercy, Lauralton Hall High School
- Charles F. Hayden School (K–8)
- Connecticut Center for Child Development (K–12)
- The Foundation School (9–12)
- Milford Christian Academy (K–12)
- St. Mary School (Pre-K–8) – Archdiocese of Hartford

St. Gabriel's School opened in 1965; at the time clergy were the primary teachers. By the 2010s there were fewer clergy teachers, and lay teachers were more expensive; in addition fewer parishioners gave money to the church. By 2016 the school's budget was $111,709 in deficit. In 2008–2009 it had a peak enrollment of 219. In 2014 there was concern expressed about the school's survival expressed in the community, and in 2016 enrollment was down to 139, with 22 being in special education. The school directors chose to close the school in June 2016; the archdiocese did not order the closure.

== Emergency services ==
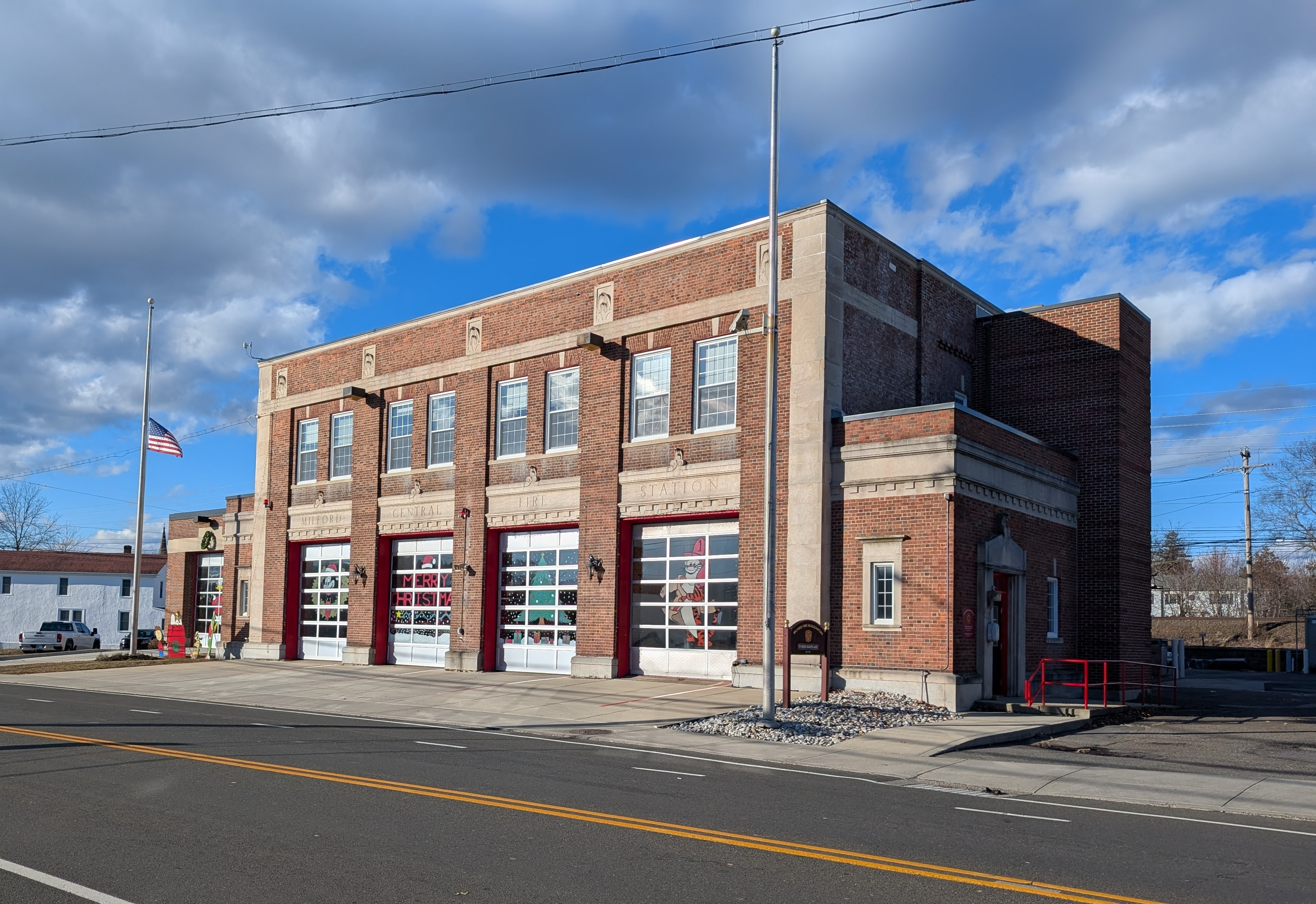
Fire Headquarters (Station 1)

The department currently operates out of four fire stations located throughout the city.

As of April 4, 2014, the Milford Police Department became one of 28 of Connecticut's 106 police departments accredited by the state of Connecticut. Divisions and units include Detective Division, Special Investigations Unit, Identification Bureau and Narcotics & Vice Squad, Crime Prevention Unit, Training Unit/Recruit Academy and Marine Patrol / Dive Team. The current chief of Milford Police is Keith L Mello.

== Principal communities of Milford ==
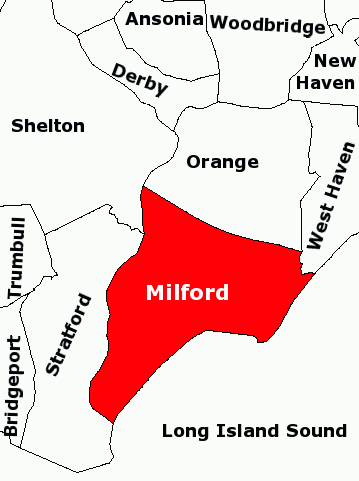
Map showing Milford and neighboring towns: Stratford, Shelton, Orange, and West Haven

- Downtown Milford
- Devon
  - Rivercliff
- Morningside†
- Point Beach†
- Bayview†
- Walnut Beach†
- Wildermere Beach†
- Laurel Beach†
- Woodmont‡

Other minor communities and geographic features are Anchor Beach, Bayview Heights, Burwells Beach, Cedar Beach, Downtown Historic District, Ettadore Park, Far View Beach, Forest Heights, Fort Trumbull, Great River, Gulf Beach, Heatherstone, Lexington Green, Merwin's Beach, Merwin's Point, Milford Lawns, Milford Point, Myrtle Beach, Naugatuck Gardens, Point Lookout, Silver Sands Beach, South of the Green, Wheelers Farms. Some of these communities have access to public and/or private beaches.

†: Denotes that the community is chartered by Special Act of the Connecticut General Assembly and have been granted some of the powers normally held only by a municipality including taxing authority.

‡: The Borough of Woodmont is chartered by Special Act of the Connecticut General Assembly as a municipality and has been granted all statutory powers of a municipality while simultaneously remaining part of the city of Milford.

== Culture and events ==
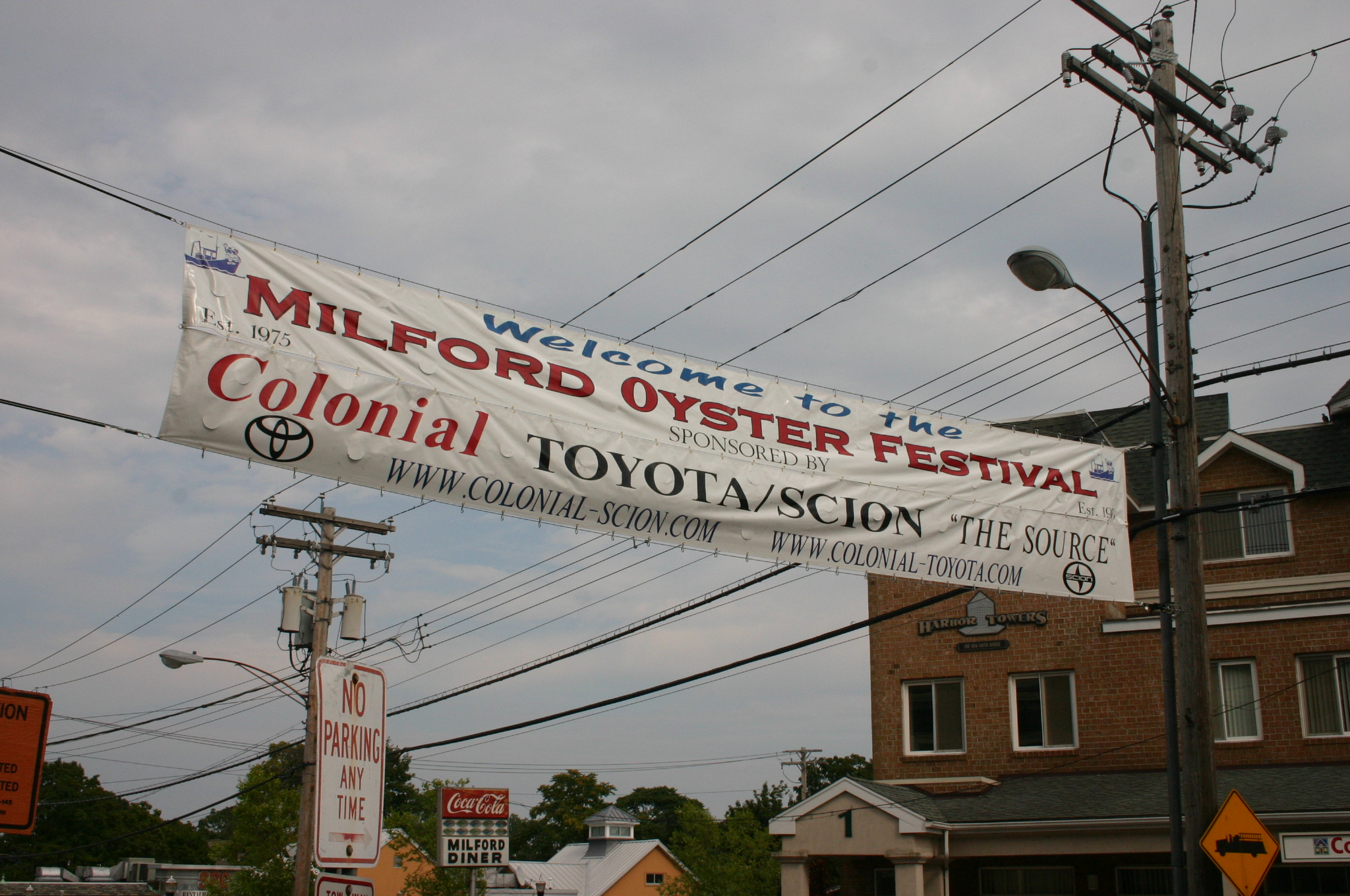
2006 Milford Oyster Festival banner

Every year on the third Saturday in August, Milford celebrates its annual Oyster Festival, which serves as a combination of a typical town fair with a culinary celebration of the town's location on historically shellfish-rich Long Island Sound. According to the "Encyclopedia of American Food and Drink" the lobster roll originated as a hot dish at a restaurant named Perry's as early as 1929. This festival takes place in and around the Milford Green, near the center of town, as well as in various locations throughout the downtown area, and features a wide variety of events including canoe and kayak races, musical performances, and classic car shows.

The Milford Oyster Festival has drawn large musical acts over the years including Joan Jett, The Marshall Tucker Band, John Cafferty & The Beaver Brown Band, and Soul Asylum.

There are also other features such as carnival rides, food stands, crafts, face painting, and even opening your own oyster for a pearl.

The Milford Cultural Center, operated by the Milford Council for the Arts, offers various events throughout the year. The Firehouse Art Gallery was recently opened in Devon. The beach resort quality of the town lives on, with several rocky beaches, Silver Sands State Park, the Connecticut Audubon Society Coastal Center at Milford Point, Charles Island, two golf courses, and numerous other recreational facilities available for residents and tourists.

Since 2011, the Walnut Beach Concert Series has taken place under the pavilion at Walnut Beach. It features a different band playing every Sunday afternoon during the summer.

== Economy ==
=== Top employers ===
Top employers in Milford according to the town's 2025 Comprehensive Annual Financial Report

#	Employer	Employees
1	City of Milford Board of Education	1,018
2	Schick (Edgewell Personal Care)	740
3	City of Milford	532
4	Bridgeport Hospital (Milford Campus)	518
5	Inline Plastics Corps	425
6	Walmart	320
7	Alinibal Holdings Corp	275
8	Quadient Inc	250
9	Shop-Rite	219
10	Stop & Shop	250

== Geography and environment ==
According to the United States Census Bureau, Milford, including the borough of Woodmont, has a total area of 26.1 square miles (67.7 km^{2}), of which 22.2 square miles (57.4 km^{2}) is land and 3.9 square miles (10.2 km^{2}), or 15.11%, is water.

Milford's Devon neighborhood is located at the mouth of the Housatonic River near Stratford, and features the Connecticut Audubon Coastal Center overlooking the estuary.

=== Islands and coastline ===
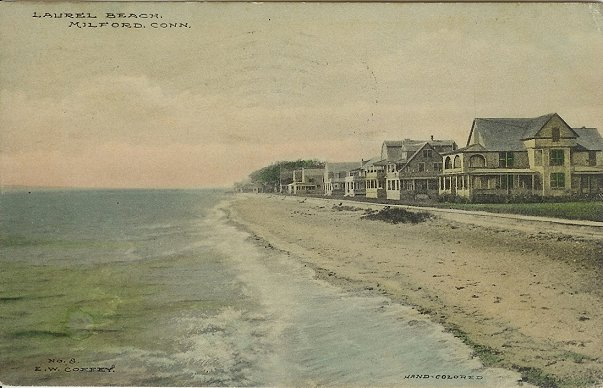
Laurel Beach, 1910

Milford has over 14 miles (23 km) of shoreline facing Long Island Sound, the most of any town in Connecticut. A large portion of Milford's shoreline forms the Silver Sands State Park. A newly built 3/4 mile boardwalk was opened in 2011 that connects Silver Sands to Walnut Beach in Devon. Charles Island is also a part of the park and is a protected bird nesting ground. There is a sandbar (called a tombolo since it is perpendicular, not parallel to the coast) accessible during low tide that people can walk on from Silver Sands Beach to Charles Island. However, the sandbar can be dangerous to walk on as the quick change from low tide to high tide has led to several drownings. Visitors to Charles Island include treasure hunters looking for stolen treasure believed to have been buried in 1699 by Captain William Kidd and his pirate crew.

The island is a part of the Hamonasset-Ledyard Moraine and was formed as glaciers retreated at the end of the last ice age. The Wisconsin glaciation formed drumlins in Milford: Clark, Burwell, Eels, Bryan and Merwin hills.

Three islands in the Housatonic River are part of Milford: Fowler Island, just to the south of the Igor I. Sikorsky Memorial Bridge, Duck Island, and Nells Island, both near the mouth of the river. In addition to Silver Sands State Park, Milford has five public beaches with lifeguard services for use by its residents – Gulf Beach, Anchor Beach, Hawley Avenue Beach, Walnut Beach, and Middle Beach – as well as seven private beaches.

== Transportation ==
Interstate 95 and U.S. Route 1 pass through the southern part of Milford. The Wilbur Cross Parkway cuts across the northern part of the city and is connected to I-95 and Route 1 via the Milford Parkway, also known as the Daniel S. Wasson connector, named for the first police officer to die in the line of duty in the city of Milford. The Metro-North New Haven Line has a station stop in downtown Milford (Milford station) with direct service to New York City. The Milford Transit District provides in-town service to major attractions. Connections with the Greater Bridgeport Transit Authority, Norwalk Transit District, and Connecticut Transit New Haven are also available.

== On the National Register of Historic Places ==
- Academy of Our Lady of Mercy Lauralton Hall — 200 High Street (added in 2011)
- Buckingham House — 61 North Street (added in 1977)
- Eells-Stow House — 34 High Street (added in 1977)
- Hebrew Congregation of Woodmont — 15 and 17 Edgefield Avenue (added in 1995)
- Housatonic River Railroad Bridge — Amtrak right-of-way at Housatonic River (added in 1987)
- Milford Point Hotel — 1 Milford Point Road (added in 1988)
- River Park Historic District — Roughly bounded by Boston Post Road, Cherry Street and Amtrak, and High Street (added in 1986)
- St. Peter's Episcopal Church — 61, 71, 81 River Street (added in 1979)
- Taylor Memorial Library — 5 Broad Street (added in 1979)
- US Post Office-Milford Main — 6 West River Street (added in 1986)
- Washington Bridge — spans the Housatonic River to Stratford (added in 2004)

== Notable people ==
- Mark Arcobello, ice hockey player
- Dylan Bruno, actor
- Doug Coby, racing driver
- Jeff Davis, creator of the TV show Teen Wolf
- Justin Gallagher, bike jump builder
- Doug Henry, National Champion motocross and snowmobile racer
- Simon Lake (1866–1945), inventor and naval engineer
- Jonathan Law (1674–1750), colonial era judge; Governor of the Colony of Connecticut, 1741–1750
- Mike Majlak, YouTuber and author.
- Joseph Plumb Martin (1760–1850), Revolutionary War soldier, raised by his grandparents in Milford
- Abigail Merwin (1759–1786), colonial-era wife and mother who alerted the local militia of a raid by British forces arriving from the warship HMS Swan
- Victor Miller (writer)
- Ellen Muth, actress
- Erin Pac, won bronze medal for two-woman-bobsleigh event at the 2010 Winter Olympics
- Dan Patrick, sportscaster and radio personality; host of The Dan Patrick Show; co-host of Football Night in America; senior writer for Sports Illustrated
- Lucy Creemer Peckham (1842–1923), physician, poet
- Jason Peter, collegiate All-American defensive tackle (1997) and defensive end for the Carolina Panthers; attended Milford Academy
- Catherine Pollard (c. 1918–2006), first female Scoutmaster in the Boy Scouts of America
- Charles H. Pond (1781–1861), judge of the New Haven County Court; sheriff of New Haven; Lieutenant Governor and 37th Governor of Connecticut
- Peter Pond (c. 1739–1807), first explorer of the Athabasca region of North America in the 1780s; founding member of the North West Company
- Peter L. Pond (1933–2000), human rights activist and philanthropist; adopted 16 Cambodian orphans
- Jonathan Quick, NHL goaltender for the New York Rangers; Stanley Cup champion
- Christy Carlson Romano, actress
- Dan Rusanowsky, NHL radio broadcaster for the San Jose Sharks
- Al Scaduto (1928–2007), cartoonist (They'll Do It Every Time)
- Frank J. Sprague (1857–1934), inventor; helped develop the electric motor, electric railways, and electric elevators
- Robert Treat (c. 1624–1710), colonial era deputy and military officer; Governor of the Colony of Connecticut, 1683–1698
- Tyler Turner (b. 1996), soccer player

== Movies filmed in Milford ==
Movies filmed at least in part in Milford include:

- Man on a Swing (1974)
- Daylight (1996)
- The Toaster Streudel Boy (2000)
- Zero Day (film) (2002)
- Furious Fish (2005)
- Save the Forest (2005)
- December Plans (2007)
- Righteous Kill (2008)
- Sad Sack Sally (2009)
