= Devon (Milford) =

Coordinates: 41.20°N 73.10°W

The village of Devon is a neighborhood of the city of Milford, Connecticut, United States. It lies on the southwest corner of the city bordering Long Island Sound and the mouth of the Housatonic River. The village generally corresponds to the Third Voting District of Milford.

== Background ==
Devon features an Audubon Center overlooking the estuary.

Julie Nash, Milford's director of economic and community development, has called Dockside Brewery the "business anchor" for Devon.

== Municipal services ==
Since it lies within the municipality of Milford, all of its municipal services are provided by the city including police, schools, and other essential municipal services. Court services are provided by the Ansonia-Milford Judicial District.

== Geography ==
Devon lies on the coast with a great amount of coastline, including the local, Walnut Beach, connecting to Connecticut's Silver Sands State Park. It also has a surprisingly high amount of inland freshwater swamps. The Charles E. Wheeler Wildlife Management Area is located in Devon. Lying 59 miles (95 km) away from Central Park, Devon is the closest point to New York City within New Haven County.

=== Flooding ===
Due to the low elevation of Devon and the high concentration of structures and pavement along Route 1 and Naugatuck Avenue, Devon experiences flooding during heavy rainstorms on a regular and increasing basis. The flooding also occurs as a result of or coincides with raised waters from Beaver Brook, the Housatonic River, or Long Island Sound.
