= Charles Island (Connecticut) =

Tidal island off the coast of Milford, Connecticut, in Long Island Sound

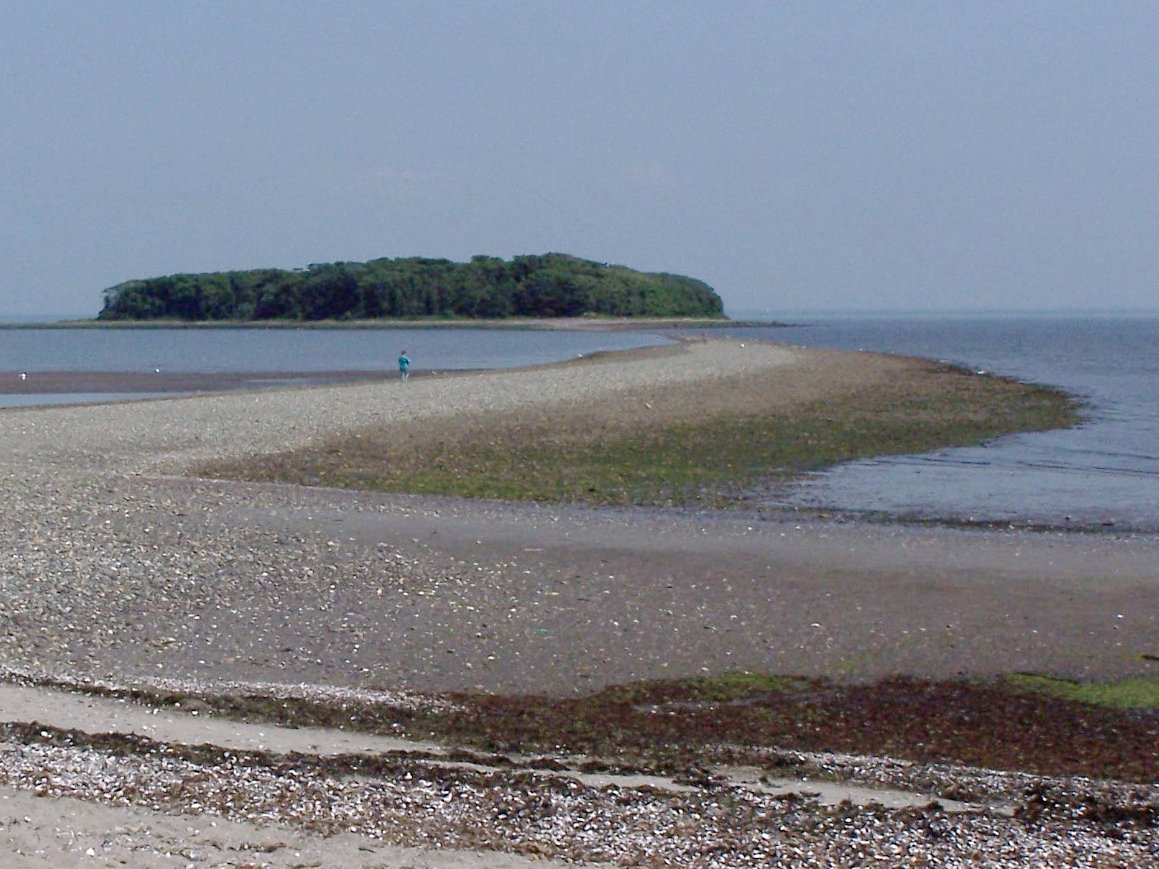
- Charles Island at low tide, including the tombolo

- Location within Connecticut

Geography
- Location: Long Island Sound
- Coordinates: 41°11′28.32″N 73°03′18″W
- Area: 14 acres (5.7 ha)

Administration
- United States
- State: Connecticut
- County: New Haven
- City: Milford

Demographics
- Population: 0
- Pop. density: 0/sq mi (0/km^{2})

Charles Island is a 14-acre (57,000 m^{2}) island located roughly 0.5 mile (1 km) off the coast of Milford, Connecticut, in Long Island Sound.

Charles Island is accessible from shore via a tombolo (locally referred to as a sandbar), which is exposed at low tide. According to early local histories, the sachem Ansantawae resided there during the summer months. European discovery of the island occurred in 1614 when Adriaen Block sailed through and mapped Long Island Sound. The island appears on his hand-drawn map found in The Netherlands National Archives.

== Access ==
Though an island during high tide, during low tide it is accessible by foot using a rocky tombolo that stretches from the beach to the island. Visitors are cautioned about the strong undertow and twice-daily flooding of the sandbar as a result of the tides. As of 2005 the crossing window was at least two hours. However, Milford locals note that earlier in the 20th century the window was much greater, but erosion has reduced the size and width of the island and sandbar.

Access to Charles Island via the sandbar is closed from dates including May 1 to August 31 to protect the bird population per sign posted and Connecticut Department of Energy and Environmental Protection.

Kayakers paddling on the side of the island not facing the Connecticut shore can be surprised by the wind and rougher waves, according to a spokesman for the Milford Fire Department. At about 2 a.m. on September 6, 2009, a 22-year-old kayaker went missing after his boat capsized. Another man with him swam to safety, but after more than a month, the victim's body had not been found.

== History ==
Originally known as Poquehaug, after the area was settled by the English in 1639 the island was referred to as Milford Island. After Charles Deal bought the island in 1657 it became known as Charles Island. Deal made a failed attempt to raise tobacco on the island – one of the first such efforts in Connecticut.

The WPA History of Milford indicates that Captain William Kidd visited Milford in 1699 when he was en route to Boston (where he was subsequently arrested for piracy and murder). Before Kidd's arrival in Boston, he off-loaded and buried treasure on Gardiners Island off the eastern tip of Long Island. The treasure was retrieved after his arrest but questions remain as to whether all the treasure was in that cache and whether he may have buried more of it along Long Island Sound.

Charles Island at High Tide from Silver Sands. Summer 2006

In 1835, the first permanent residence was constructed on the island by John Harris. After his death the island was owned by several different owners and in 1852 it was purchased by Elizur Pritchard of Waterbury, Connecticut who turned the large house into a summer resort known originally as Charles Island House and later as Ansantawae House. After the Civil War the resort closed and the island was leased to the George Miles Company as a base for their fish fertilizer operations.

In 1884, the island was briefly considered as a location for the first clubhouse of American Yacht Club.

After the Miles Company left the island it was relatively unused until the 1927 when the Dominican Order arranged for the construction of facilities for religious retreats on the island, which began in July, 1929. The Aquinas Retreat consisted of a chapel, small cabins for the retreatants, a central dining hall and religious shrines located along paths throughout the island. The retreat closed in the late 1930s and the island went up for sale in 1938. Some of the remnants of the retreat buildings remain on the island.

=== Modern era ===
The State of Connecticut owns the island and it is part of Silver Sands State Park. It is designated a Natural Area Preserve for the local bird population of herons and egrets. White-tail deer were common, but the estimated 16 deer on the island were hunted by the Department of Environment Protection (now the Department of Energy and Environmental Protection) in February 2011 to protect the nesting birds. The waters around the island have bluefish, snapper blues, sand sharks, and horseshoe crabs.

The waters west of the island have been a site for oyster farming since 2013, in an area of approximately 3.4 acres (1.4 ha).
