= Silver Sands State Park =

State park in New Haven County, Connecticut

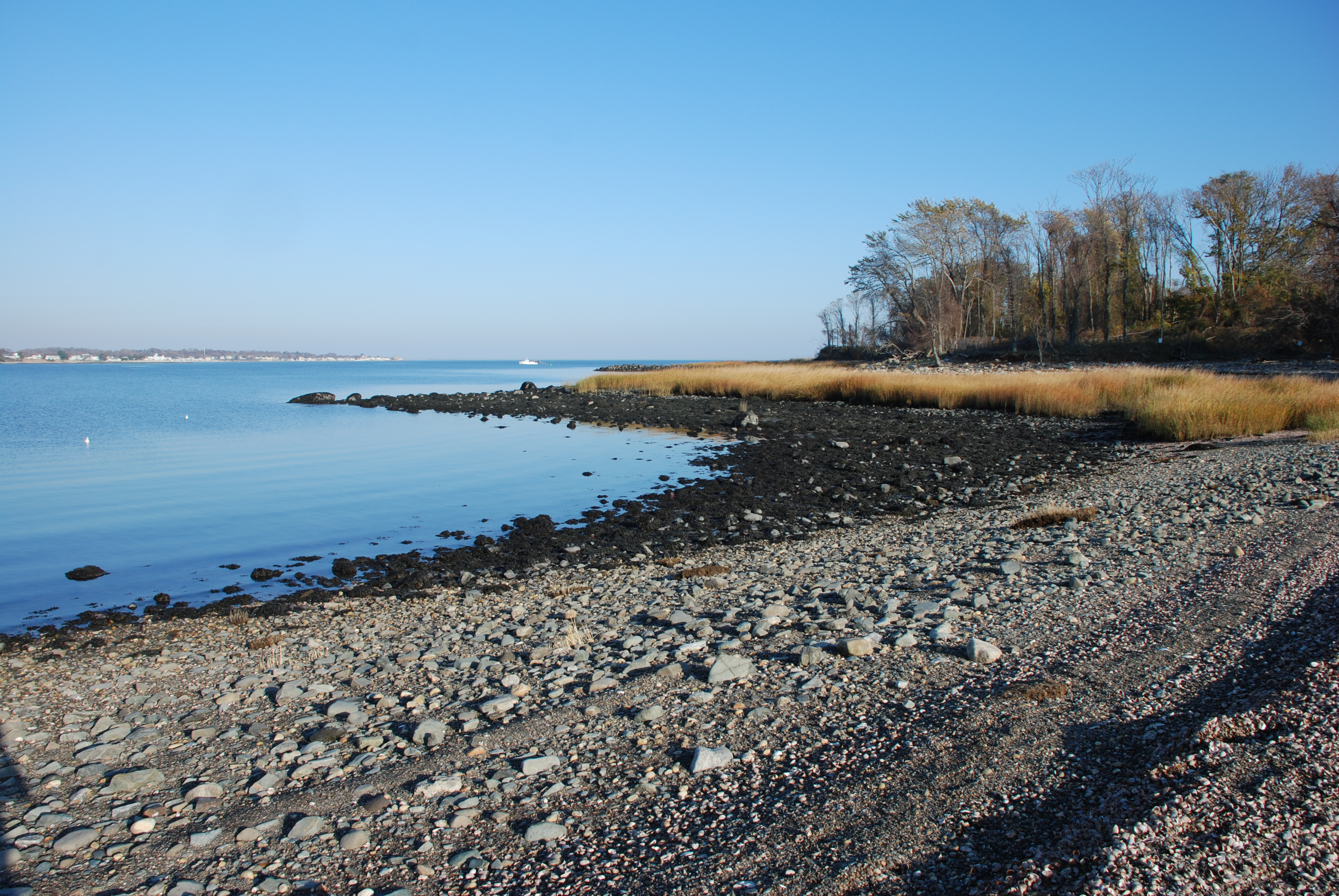
- Tombolo to Charles Island at low tide

- Location within Connecticut Location within the United States
- Location: Milford, Connecticut, United States
- Coordinates: 41°11′38″N 73°03′36″W
- Area: 297 acres (120 ha)
- Elevation: 0 ft (0 m)
- Established: 1960
- Administrator: Connecticut Department of Energy and Environmental Protection
- Designation: Connecticut state park
- Website: Official website

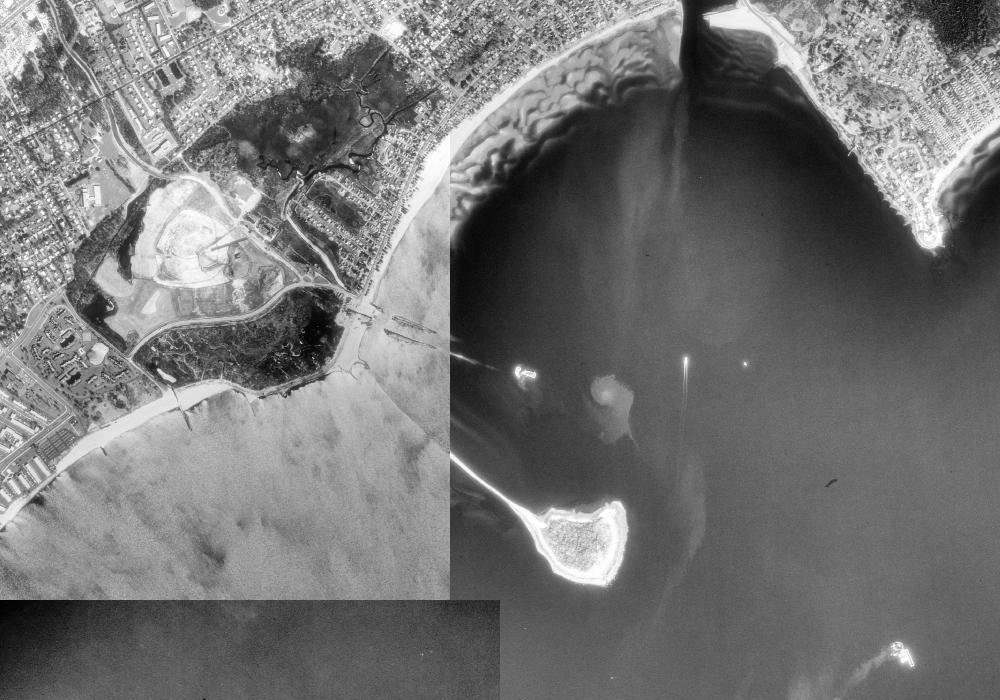
Aerial photo of Silver Sands State Park, including Charles Island

Silver Sands State Park is a public recreation area located on Long Island Sound in the city of Milford, Connecticut. The state park consists of 297 acres (120 ha) of beach, dunes, restored salt marsh, open areas and woods as well as the 14-acre (5.7 ha) bird sanctuary of Charles Island. The park offers swimming, picnicking, trails, boardwalks, and opportunities for bird-watching. It is managed by the Connecticut Department of Energy and Environmental Protection.

== History ==
The area includes the tidal channels of the Fletcher's Creek and Nettleton Creek watershed and had been a local dumping site and landfill from the 1920s until 1977. Soil analyses have indicated the presence of heavy metal pollutants, probably due to the area's use as a dump.

Acquisition of the park land by the state began in 1955, after Hurricane Diane destroyed 75 homes on the site. Once the last acquisitions were made, the park became a reality in 1960. In 1997, a project to restore the coastal wetlands along Silver Sands was approved. The park was renovated according to plans begun in 1990 by architect Alfredo De Vido and completed in 2000.

== Features ==
During low tide, visitors can walk across the tombolo to Charles Island, except from May through August when the island's nesting birds are left undisturbed. The wooded interior of Charles Island is protected for heron and egret rookeries. It is one of the largest wading bird rookeries in the state. The ruins of a Catholic retreat from the 1920s remain on the island. Popular belief says the island is the site of Captain Kidd's buried treasure.

The park lies adjacent to the city-owned Walnut Beach, to which it is connected by boardwalk. A boardwalk with railings extends from the parking lot to the beach (about 200 ft) and also runs along part of the beach. The land alongside the boardwalk had been used as a landfill. However, the salt water tidal marsh is being environmentally restored. Through the marsh, there are also remnants of the foundations of cottages that were destroyed by Diane. There is also an old dirt road that goes east–west through the park. Park trails form segments of the East Coast Greenway.

Many birds can be seen at the park. Least and common terns feed here. It is also a wintering area for raptors such as the rough-legged hawk, the snowy owl and the short-eared owl.
