= Woodmont, Connecticut =

- Borough
- Borough of Woodmont
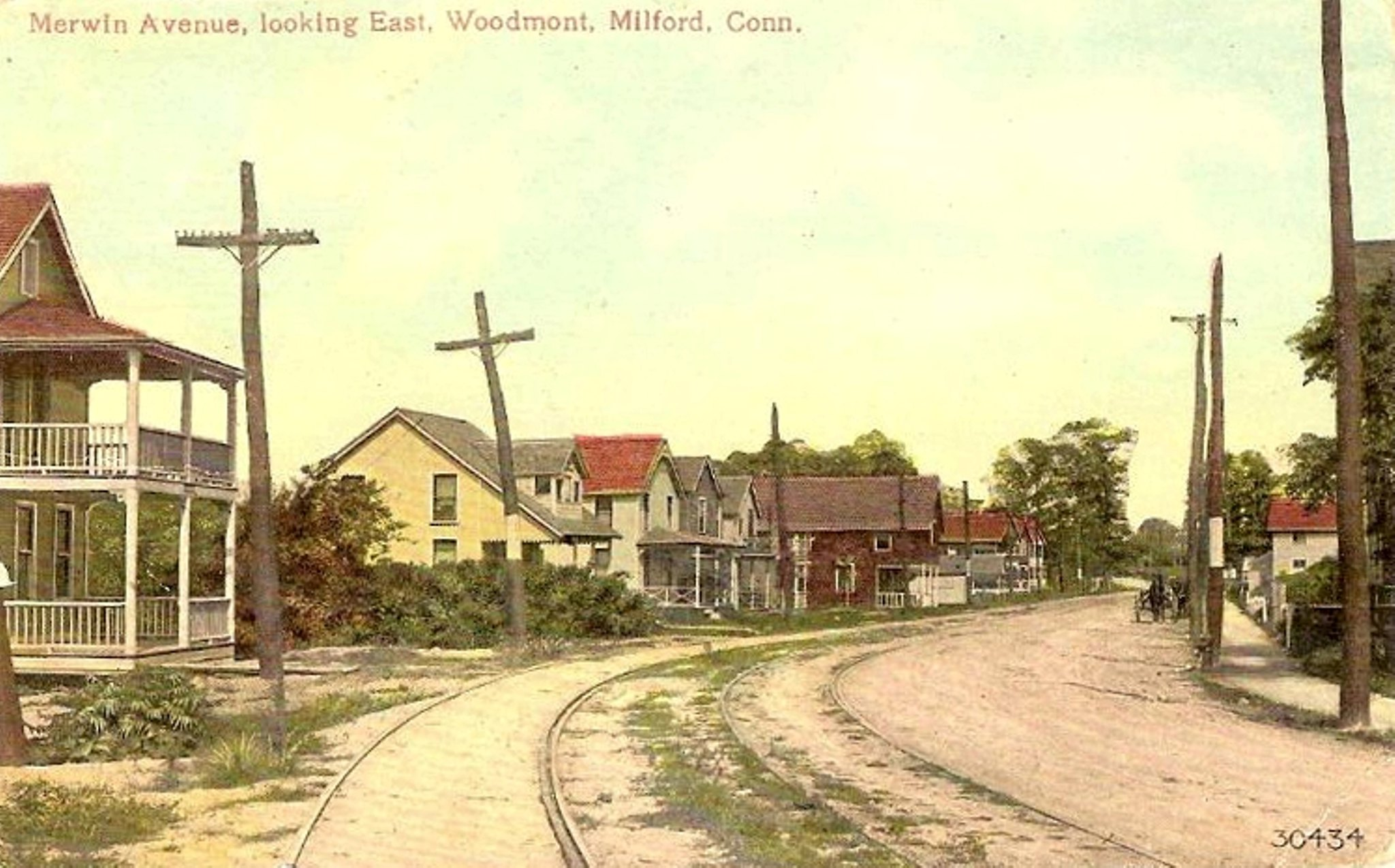
- Vintage postcard of Merwin Avenue

- Flag

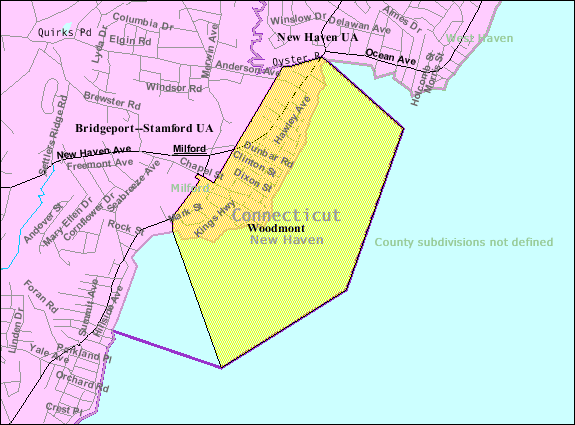
- U.S. Census Map

- Location within the state of Connecticut
- Coordinates: 41°13′41″N 72°59′32″W
- Country: United States
- U.S. state: Connecticut
- County: New Haven
- Region: South Central CT
- Town: Milford

Area
  - Total: 1.00 sq mi (2.58 km^{2})
  - Land: 0.27 sq mi (0.71 km^{2})
  - Water: 0.72 sq mi (1.86 km^{2})
- Elevation: 39 ft (12 m)

Population (2020)
  - Total: 1,486
  - Density: 5,652.5/sq mi (2,182.43/km^{2})
- Time zone: UTC-5 (EST)
  - Summer (DST): UTC-4 (EDT)
- Postal code: 06460
- FIPS code: 09-88050
- GNIS feature ID: 0212247
- Website: www.boroughofwoodmont.us

Woodmont is a borough of the City of Milford, in New Haven County, Connecticut. The population was 1,486 at the 2020 census. It was first created by Special Act of Connecticut General Assembly in 1893 as the Woodmont Improvement Association. In 1903 it became the Woodmont Association. It became a municipality in 1957 when the Connecticut General Assembly passed House Bill No. 2443 "An Act to change the Association status of Woodmont to Borough status".

Woodmont is one of 9 Boroughs in Connecticut. The government of the borough works closely with the city of Milford to provide services such as road maintenance, snow plowing, street lighting, beach maintenance, and supplemental police service. There is an extra yearly tax assessment, beyond what is owed to the city of Milford, for borough residents to pay for services in excess of what the city of Milford provides to the rest of Milford.

== Geography ==
According to the United States Census Bureau, the borough has a total area of 1.0 square mile (2.6 km^{2}), of which 0.3 square miles (0.78 km^{2}) is land and 0.7 square miles (1.8 km^{2}), or 71.43%, is water.

A majority of the borough land mass is safely above sea level. However, it does have a few low elevation areas which are subject to flooding during very heavy storm situations (Hurricanes). The most recent, circa 2013 FEMA generated flood map is shown at the right, with the borough border roughly outlined in white.

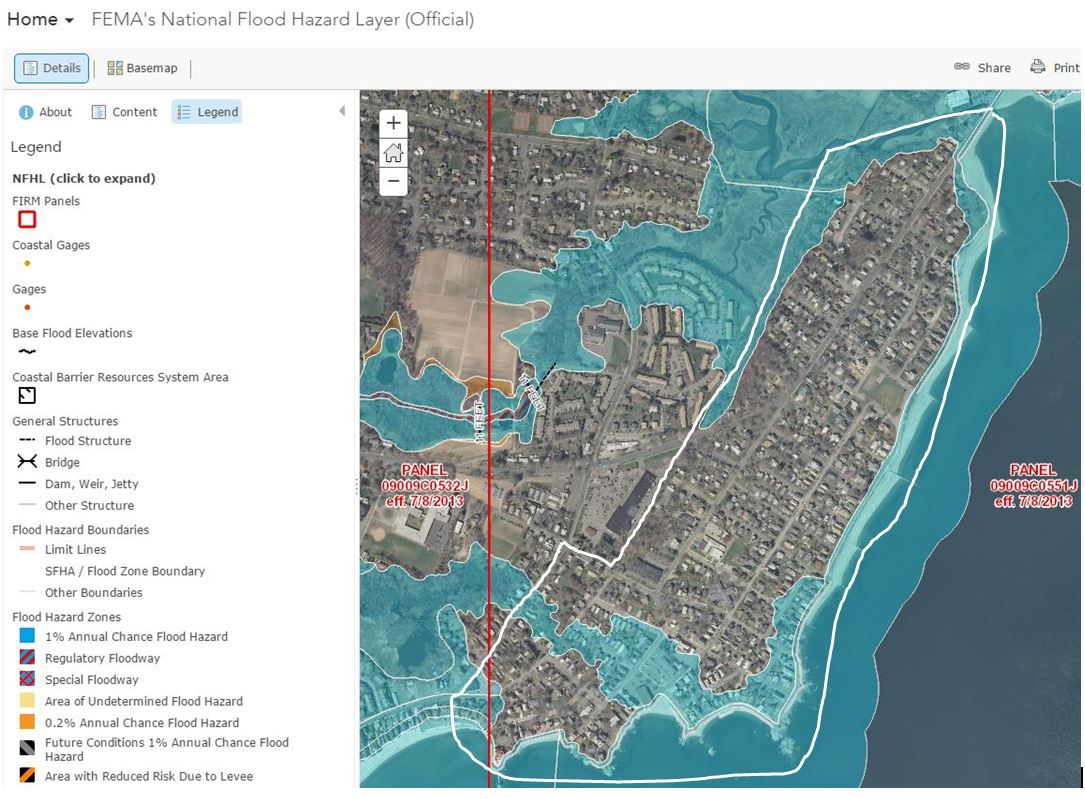
FEMA Woodmont Flood map

== Demographics ==
Historical population
Census	Pop.	Note	%±
1910	194		—
1920	220		13.4%
1930	531		141.4%
1940	748		40.9%
1970	2,114		—
1980	1,797		−15.0%
1990	1,770		−1.5%
2000	1,711		−3.3%
2010	1,488		−13.0%
2020	1,486		−0.1%
U.S. Decennial Census

=== 2020 census ===
As of the 2020 census, Woodmont had a population of 1,486. The median age was 53.4 years. 10.3% of residents were under the age of 18 and 25.8% of residents were 65 years of age or older. For every 100 females there were 93.7 males, and for every 100 females age 18 and over there were 92.9 males age 18 and over.

100.0% of residents lived in urban areas, while 0.0% lived in rural areas.

There were 721 households in Woodmont, of which 18.2% had children under the age of 18 living in them. Of all households, 44.8% were married-couple households, 21.4% were households with a male householder and no spouse or partner present, and 26.8% were households with a female householder and no spouse or partner present. About 33.4% of all households were made up of individuals and 13.1% had someone living alone who was 65 years of age or older.

There were 782 housing units, of which 7.8% were vacant. The homeowner vacancy rate was 1.3% and the rental vacancy rate was 4.0%.

Racial composition as of the 2020 census
Race	Number	Percent
White	1,297	87.3%
Black or African American	25	1.7%
American Indian and Alaska Native	0	0.0%
Asian	28	1.9%
Native Hawaiian and Other Pacific Islander	0	0.0%
Some other race	21	1.4%
Two or more races	115	7.7%
Hispanic or Latino (of any race)	109	7.3%

=== 2010 census ===
As of the 2010 census, there were 1,488 people, 691 households, and 406 families residing in the borough. The population density was 4960 people per(land) square mile (1,915/km^{2}). There were 786 housing units at an average density of 2,620 units per square mile (1,010 units/km^{2}). The racial makeup of the borough was 97.4% White, 1.1% African American, 0.1% Native American, 1.3% Asian, 0.7% from other races, and 0.64% from two or more races. Hispanic or Latino of any race were 5.8% of the population.

There were 762 households, out of which 23.8% had children under the age of 18 living with them, 45.1% were married couples living together, 10.1% had a female householder with no husband present, and 41.3% were non-families. 34.4% of all households were made up of individuals, and 9.3% had someone living alone who was 65 years of age or older. The average household size was 2.25 and the average family size was 2.91.

In the borough the population was spread out, with 19.5% under the age of 18, 5.8% from 18 to 24, 33.0% from 25 to 44, 27.8% from 45 to 64, and 13.9% who were 65 years of age or older. The median age was 41 years. For every 100 females, there were 94.9 males. For every 100 females age 18 and over, there were 93.7 males.
