= CT Transit New Haven =

Bus operator in Connecticut

CT New Haven

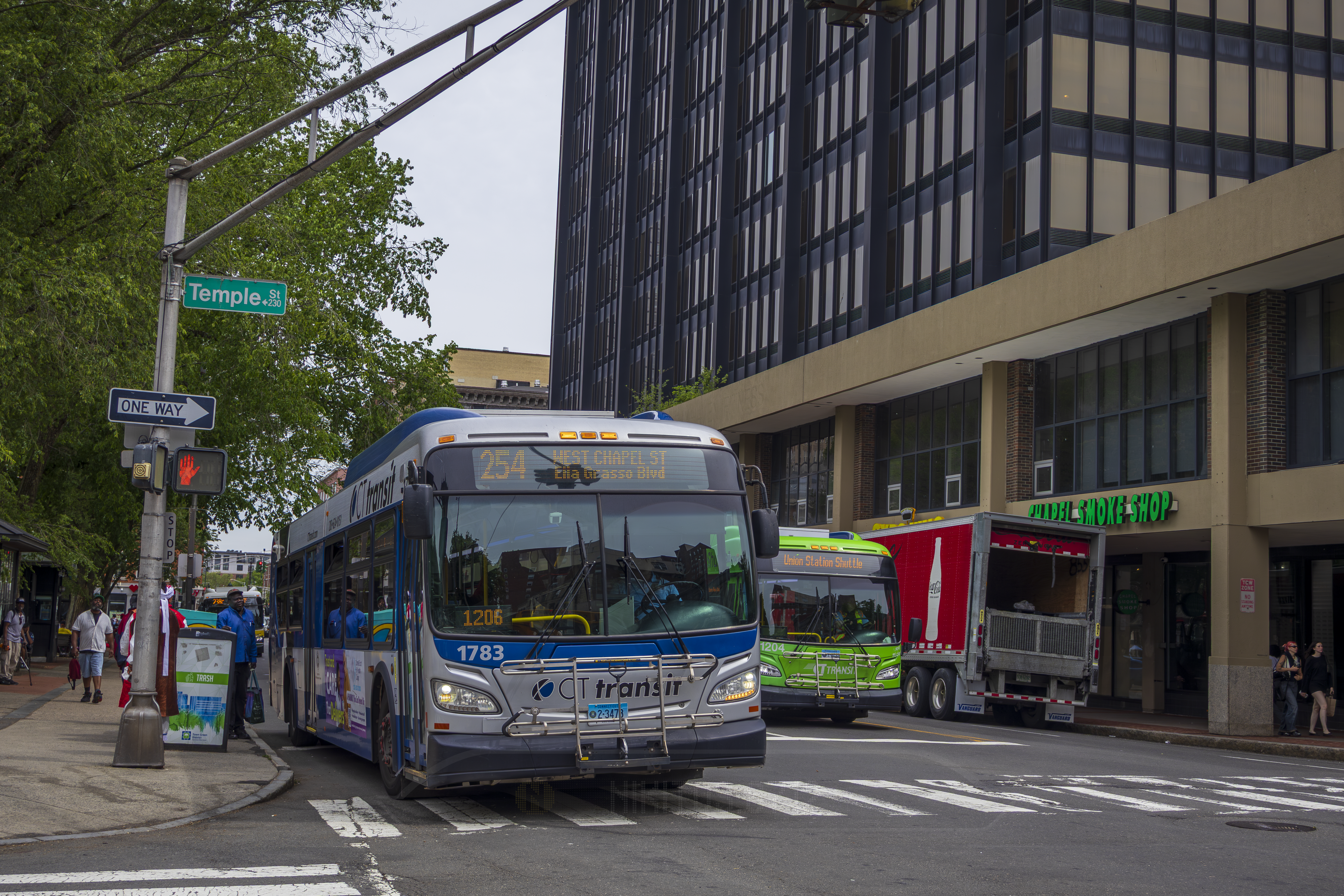
- CT Transit New Haven Division New Flyer Xcelsior XD40s 1204 and 1783 departs from the New Haven Green on the 254 and USS (Union Station Shuttle) routes, respectively
- Parent: Connecticut Department of Transportation
- Founded: 1976
- Headquarters: 2061 State Street; Hamden, Connecticut 06517
- Locale: Connecticut
- Service area: Greater New Haven
- Service type: Local bus service
- Routes: 24 local 1 flyer 2 commuter shuttle
- Hubs: New Haven Green
- Fleet: 114
- Operator: RATP Dev, USA
- Chief executive: Thomas E. Stringer, Jr. HNS General Manager
- Website: Official Website

CT New Haven is the second largest division of Connecticut Transit, providing service on 24 routes in 19 towns within the Greater New Haven and Lower Naugatuck River Valley areas, with connections to other CT Transit routes in Waterbury and Meriden, as well as connections to systems in Milford and Bridgeport at the Connecticut Post Mall.

Since 1979, the Hartford, New Haven, and Stamford divisions of CT Transit have been operated by First Transit. Service is operated seven days a week on 24 routes.

== Routes ==
=== Regular routes ===
All routes below originate from the New Haven Green. Through service is provided between routes with the same letter. In October 2017, CTtransit New Haven transitioned their routes from letters to numbers, and are now identified as routes 201-299.

Route	Route name	Terminus	Neighborhoods/towns served	Notes
USS	Union Station Shuttle	Union Station	USS: Union Station Free Shuttle	Downtown New Haven: This is a free shuttle connecting Union Station with the New Haven Green and the Temple Street Garage, and a surface lot at the former Coliseum site.
201	Madison	201 (S1): Madison via US 1	New Haven, East Haven, Branford, Guilford, Madison	Connects to Route 204 (formerly Route F) at Branford Green.; Connects to 9-Town Transit at the Scranton Gazebo in Madison.; No service on Sunday.
204	East Haven	204 (F3): Branford Green; 204 (F4): Walmart (Branford); 204M (F2): Momauguin	Wooster Square, Annex, East Haven, Branford	Connects to Route 201 (formerly Route S) at Branford Green.; Night and Sunday service to East Haven Center is provided by Route 206E (formerly Route GF).; Provides through-route service to Route 254 (West Chapel Street) or Route 255 (Ansonia/Seymour).
206	East Chapel Street	206 (G2): Tweed New Haven Airport-Lighthouse Road; 206E (GF): Tweed NH Airport-East Haven Center; 206F (G): Ferry Street	Fair Haven, Fair Haven Heights, Annex, East Shore	Night and Sunday service to East Haven Center is provided by Route 206E (formerly Route GF).; Provides through-route service to Route 237 (Shelton Avenue).; Provides service to Tweed New Haven Airport
212	Grand Avenue	212 (D): Ferry Street; 212B (D3): Bella Vista; 212F (D12): Bella Vista-Walmart (New Haven)-Foxon Road; 212F (DL): Bella Vista-Foxon Road-North Branford; 212U (D13): Bella Vista-Walmart-Universal Drive; 212U (D14): Universal Drive-North Haven Center; 212UX (C4): UNIVERSAL DRIVE via I-91; 212W (D4): Bella Vista-Walmart (New Haven)	Fair Haven, Fair Haven Heights	Route 212F to North Branford operates weekdays only.; Provides through-route service to Route 238 (Dixwell Avenue).
213	North Branford	213X (L1): North Branford Center via Maple & Carol; 213X (L2): North Branford Center via Foxon Road	Quinnipiac Meadows, East Haven (Foxon), North Branford	Weekday service only
215	North Haven/Wallingford/Meriden	215 (C3): North Haven Center via Grand Avenue; 215X (C3X): North Haven Center via I-91; 215M (C1): Meriden TC via Grand Avenue; 215MX (C1X): Meriden TC via I-91; 215W (C2): Wallingford via Grand Avenue; 215WX (C2X): Wallingford via I-91 215X: Amazon	Fair Haven Heights, Quinnipiac Meadows, North Haven, Wallingford, Meriden	Route 215M connects to the new CTrail Hartford Line, Route 919 Express to Hartford, Meriden Routes 561, 563, 564, 565 & 566, and the M-Link to Middletown at the Meriden Transit Center.; Routes 215M & 215W connect to Wallingford Routes 291 & 292 at Wallingford Green.; Service to Universal Drive in North Haven is operated by Route 212U.
223	Lombard Street	223 (Q1): Clinton Park; 223W (Q3): Walmart (New Haven)	East Rock, Fair Haven	Provides through-route service to Route 246 (Edgewood Avenue).
224	State Street	224 (M5): State & Ridge; 224D (M3): Devine Street; 224N (M4): Northside	East Rock, Hamden, North Haven	Route 224D Connects to the 950-Hartford Express at the Devine Park & Ride.; Provides through-route service to Route 268 (Washington Avenue).
228	Whitney Avenue	228 (J) Davis Street; 228C (J1): Centerville; 228C (J2): Centerville via Hamden Hills & Hamden Plaza; 228H (J8): Hamden Plaza via Skiff Street	East Rock, Prospect Hill, Hamden	Provides through-route service to Route 271 (Kimberly Avenue).
229	Waterbury	229 (J4) Cheshire/Waterbury via Whitney Avenue; 229X (J4X): Waterbury via I-91	East Rock, Prospect Hill, Hamden, Cheshire, Waterbury	Connects to the CTtransit Waterbury routes and Route 925 (or 928) express to Hartford at the Exchange Place on West Main Street; Provides through-route service to Routes 271 (Kimberly Avenue) or 272 (Union Avenue).
234	Winchester Avenue	234 (O4): Millrock Road; 234P (O5): Davenport Apts; 234P (O7): Davenport Apts-Putnam Place	Prospect Hill, Newhallville, Hamden	Possibly getting combined with another route in October 2017.; Provides through-route service to Route 261 (Boston Post Road).
237	Shelton Avenue	237 (G1): Marlboro Street; 237P (G3): Marlboro Street-Putnam Place; 237P (G4): Marlboro Street-Pine Rock 237B: Marlboro Street-Brookside	Dixwell, Newhallville	Route 237P (formerly Route G4) route replaced the old O6 route to Pine Rock Avenue on January 6, 2013.; Provides through-route service to Route 206 (East Chapel Street).
238	Dixwell Avenue	238 (D5): Hamden Plaza; 238C (D6): Hamden Plaza-Hamden Hills-Centerville; 238C (D7): Hamden Plaza-Centerville; 238C (D8): Hamden Plaza-Hamden Hills-Centerville via Circular Avenue; 238C(D9): Hamden Plaza-Centerville via Circular Avenue; 238P (D10): Putnam Place	Dixwell, Newhallville, Hamden	No service to Centerville on Saturday, limited service to Centerville on Sunday.; Provides through-route service to Route 212 (Grand Avenue).
241	Goffe Street	241 (Z1): West Hills; 246A (FQZ): EDGEWOOD AVENUE-Amity Road/West Hills via West Chapel Street(weeknights and all day Sunday)	Dixwell, Beaver Hills, West Rock, Amity	Provides through-route service to Route 274 (Sargent Drive).
243	Whalley Avenue	243A (B2): Amity Road-Amity Shopping Center; 243A (B3): Amity Road-JCC; 243A (B3): Amity Road-JCC-Seymour; 243B (B1): SCSU-Brookside	Westville, West Rock, Amity, Woodbridge	AM trips to Seymour continue to New Haven via Route 255 (formerly route F).; PM trips operate via Route 255 to Seymour, then continue to New Haven via Route 243.; Provides through-route service to Route 265 (Congress Avenue).
246	Edgewood Avenue	246 (Q2): Fountain Street; 246A (Q4): Amity Road; 246A (FQZ): Amity Road/West Hills via West Chapel Street (weeknights and all day Sunday)	Dwight, Edgewood, Westville, Amity	Provides through-route service to Route 223 (Lombard Street).; Provides service to the Yale Bowl and Yale University athletic fields.
254	West Chapel Street	254 (F5): Ella Grasso Boulevard; 246A (FQZ): EDGEWOOD AVENUE-Amity Road/West Hills via West Chapel Street	Dwight, West River	Provides through-route service to Route 204 (East Haven).
255	Ansonia-Seymour	255 (F6): Ansonia-Seymour via West Chapel Street & Derby Rail Road Station	Dwight, West River, Derby, Shelton, Ansonia, Seymour	Connects with Greater Bridgeport Transit Routes 15 & 23 to Bridgeport at the Derby Rail Road Station (Metro North).; Provides through-route service to Route 204 (East Haven).
261	Boston Post Road	261 (O2): Connecticut Post Mall	The Hill, West River, West Haven, Orange, Milford	Connects to the Coastal Link through Greater Bridgeport Transit, Milford Transit District, and Norwalk Transit District, as well as Milford Transit District local route 4.
262 (Replaced 261X,55X,PMF Discontinued)	Milford-New Haven	262 Milford-New Haven via I-95	Connecticut Post Mall, VA Errera Community Care Center, Edison Road, FedEx, United Illuminating, Marsh Hill Road, Connair Road, and Oyster River Business Park. Milford,Orange,New Haven	Route 262 connects to Route 261, Milford Transit District routes 2 and 4, and Coastal Link at Connecticut Post Mall.
265	Congress Avenue	265 (B): West Haven Center; 265B (B4): Bull Hill Lane/Sawmill Road; 265B (BO): Bull Hill Lane/Sawmill Road via Boston Post Road; 265B (BJO): Bull Hill Lane via Boston Post Road & Union Station; 265R (B5): Oyster River; 265R (B6): Oyster River via Railroad Ave; 265S (B7): Savin Rock	The Hill, West Haven Center	Provides through-route service to Route 243 (Whalley Avenue).
268	Washington Avenue	268 (M1): New Haven Career Campus; 268C (M2): Veterans Hospital Coleman & Greta; 268B (M7): Veterans Hospital Bull Hill Lane; 268C (ZM): Long Wharf-Veterans Hospital Coleman & Greta via Sargent Drive	The Hill, West Haven	Provides through-route service to Route 224 (State Street).
271	Kimberly Avenue	271 (J): Ella Grasso Boulevard 271M (J7): Milford Green; 271M (J7): Milford Green-CT Post Mall; 271R (J6): Oyster River (Sunday only); 271S (J5): Savin Rock	The Hill, City Point, West Haven, Woodmont, Milford	Serves New Haven Union Station; Route 271M connects to Route 261, Milford Transit District routes 2 and 4, and Coastal Link at Connecticut Post Mall.; Provides through-route service to Route 228 (Whitney Avenue) or Route 229 (Waterbury).; Also connects to the New Haven Line. for Metro-North Railroad, and Shore Line East. at Downtown Milford, Connecticut
272	Union Avenue	272 (J): Union Station; 268B (BJO): CONGRESS AVENUE-Bull Hill Lane via Boston Post Road & Union Station		Provides through-route service to Route 228 (Whitney Avenue) or Route 229 (Waterbury).
274	Sargent Drive	274 (Z2): Long Wharf; 274C (Z3): City Point; 268C (ZM): WASHINGTON AVENUE-Long Wharf-Veterans Hospital Coleman & Greta	Long Wharf	Provides through-route service to Route 241 (Goffe Street).
278	New Haven Connector Downtown Loop	Union Station	Downtown New Haven	Service coordinates with Amtrak, Shore Line East, Hartford Line, and Metro North Trains.; Weekday service only
950	Hartford Express	950 (20 [née 42]): Hartford Express	New Haven, North Haven, Meriden, Middletown, Wethersfield, Hartford	Serves New Haven Union Station; Serves the Devine Park & Ride in North Haven, the Country Club Park & Ride in Middletown, and the Wolcott Hill Park & Ride in Wethersfield.; Serves Hartford Union Station.; Operated by Arrow Line Acquisition/ Peter Pan Bus Lines.

== Operation ==
The system operates with a spoke-hub distribution paradigm, with all routes meeting at New Haven Green.

== See also ==
- Connecticut Transit Hartford
- Connecticut Transit New Britain and Bristol
- Connecticut Transit Stamford
- Northeast Transportation Company

All of the above provide CT Transit route service.
