= Canton, Connecticut =

- Town
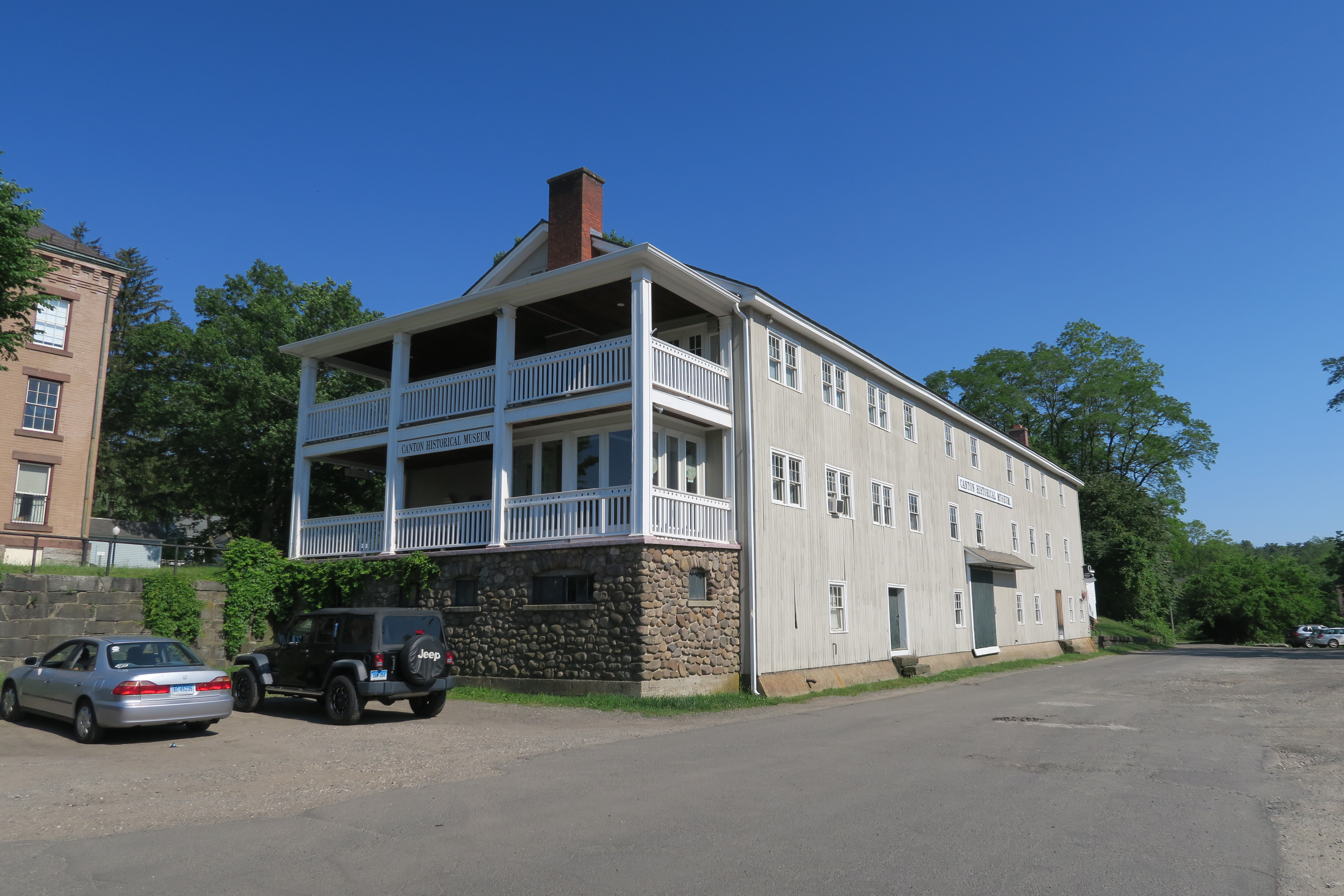
- Canton Historical Museum

- Seal
- Interactive map of Canton, Connecticut
- Coordinates: 41°51′42″N 72°54′33″W
- Country: United States
- U.S. state: Connecticut
- County: Hartford
- Region: Capitol Region
- Incorporated: 1806
- Hamlets: Canton (Canton Valley); Canton Center; Collinsville; North Canton

Government
  - Type: Selectman-town meeting
  - First Selectman: Kevin Witkos (R)
  - Selectmen: Sarah Hague (D); Elizabeth Corkum Winsor (D); Timothy LeGeyt (R); Sarah Faulkner(D)

Area
  - Total: 25.0 sq mi (64.8 km^{2})
  - Land: 24.6 sq mi (63.7 km^{2})
  - Water: 0.42 sq mi (1.1 km^{2})
- Elevation: 436 ft (133 m)

Population (2020)
  - Total: 10,124
  - Density: 411.6/sq mi (158.9/km^{2})
- Time zone: UTC-5 (EST)
  - Summer (DST): UTC-4 (EDT)
- ZIP Codes: 06019, 06020, 06022, 06059
- Area codes: 860/959
- FIPS code: 09-12270
- GNIS feature ID: 0213404
- Website: www.townofcantonct.org

Canton is a town, incorporated in 1806, located in the Farmington Valley of Connecticut in the United States. It is part of Connecticut's Capitol Planning Region and the population was 10,124 as of the 2020 census. It is bordered by Granby on the north, Simsbury on the east, Avon and Burlington on the south, New Hartford on the west, and Barkhamsted on the northwest. Running through it is the Farmington River. The town includes the villages of North Canton, Canton Center, Canton (Canton Valley), and Collinsville. In September 2007, Collinsville was ranked in Budget Travel magazine as one of the "Ten Coolest Small Towns In America".

== History ==
The name of Canton was officially designated on its incorporation in 1806. While assisting with the town's organization, its name was given by Ephraim Mills, ancestor of Lewis S. Mills. There are two competing theories for Mills' source of the name, however.

According to William Edgar Simonds, husband of Ephraim Mills' great-granddaughter, and Sylvester Barbour in his book Reminisces, Canton's name derives from canton, a Swiss administrative division. Simonds wrote that Canton "... is derived from a supposed likeness to a Swiss canton, the meaning of the word being to divide or set off, and the partition from Simsbury made the name appropriate." Barbour instead noted that "it came from Mr. Mills' interest in the Swiss people and their ardent patriotism, and was suggested to his mind by their territorial divisions into cantons. The name appealed to him, partly because of its pleasant sound, and its being so easy to read and write."

In an article within a 1903 issue of The Connecticut Magazine, Joel N. Eno claimed without a source that Canton's name derived from Canton, an archaic name for Guangzhou, China. This claim has since been repeated by others, such as The Register Citizen, a Connecticut newspaper.

Other towns such as Canton, Massachusetts and Canton, Ohio have used the name for the town.

It separated from Simsbury in 1806. At the Collins ax factory in Collinsville, Elisha Root invented the important industrial technique of die casting.

== Points of interest ==
Collinsville Axe Factory Train Bridge

The Canton Historical Museum in Collinsville is located in a building of the former Collins Axe Company, founded by Samuel W. Collins and one of the first ax factories in the world. It displays a 19th-century general store, a post office, a printing press and blacksmith and barber shops. Vehicles, tools and farm implements are also exhibited, as well as a working railroad diorama, Victorian fashions, toys and dolls.

The town is on the Farmington River, and Collinsville Canoe & Kayak is the largest specialty canoe and kayak store in New England. A rail trail also runs through the town.

In the southeastern corridor of Canton, along U.S. Route 44, there is an open-air shopping center called The Shops at Farmington Valley, which opened in 2004. The shopping center has space for 50 stores and restaurants.

The Collinsville Renewable Energy Promotion Act (H.R. 316;113th Congress) was a piece of federal legislation that dealt specifically with Collinsville. The bill was introduced into the United States House of Representatives of the 113th United States Congress by Representative Elizabeth Esty. The bill directed the Federal Energy Regulatory Commission to reinstate two lapsed licenses and grant them to the town so that the town could restart two old dams and generate hydroelectric power.

== Geography ==
According to the United States Census Bureau, the town has a total area of 25.0 square miles (64.8 km^{2}), of which 24.6 square miles (63.7 km^{2}) is land and 0.42 square miles (1.1 km^{2}), or 1.76%, is water. The town center is a census-designated place (CDP) known as Canton Valley, with an area of 1.8 square miles (4.6 km^{2}), all land.

== Demographics ==
Historical population
Census	Pop.	Note	%±
1820	1,322		—
1850	1,986		—
1860	2,373		19.5%
1870	2,639		11.2%
1880	2,301		−12.8%
1890	2,500		8.6%
1900	2,678		7.1%
1910	2,732		2.0%
1920	2,549		−6.7%
1930	2,397		−6.0%
1940	2,769		15.5%
1950	3,613		30.5%
1960	4,783		32.4%
1970	6,868		43.6%
1980	7,635		11.2%
1990	8,268		8.3%
2000	8,840		6.9%
2010	10,292		16.4%
2020	10,124		−1.6%
U.S. Decennial Census

As of the census of 2010, there were 10,129 people, 4,086 households, and 2,785 families residing in the town. The racial makeup of the town was 95.7% White, 0.9% African American, 0.3% Native American, 1.5% Asian, 0.0% Pacific Islander, 0.4% from other races, and 1.2% from two or more races. Hispanic or Latino of any race were 2.6% of the population. The population density according to the 2000 census, was 359.7 people per square mile (138.9 people/km^{2}). There were 3,616 housing units at an average density of 147.2 units per square mile (56.8 units/km^{2}).

There were 4,086 households, out of which 57.8% had children under the age of 18 living with them, 57.5% were married couples living together, 7.68% had a female householder with no husband present, 2.94% had a male householder with no wife present, and 31.84% were non-families. 10.5% had someone living alone who was 65 years of age or older. The average household size was 2.46 and the average family size was 3.01.

In the town, the population was spread out, with 25.7% under the age of 20, 3.7% from 20 to 24, 22.7% from 25 to 44, 32.8% from 45 to 64, and 15.1% who were 65 years of age or older. The median age was 43.9 years. Females made up 51.7% of the population.

As of 2018, the median income for a household in the town was $91,651, and the median income for a family was $131,673. Males had a median income of $49,980 versus $37,652 for females. The per capita income for the town was $53,007. About 1.9% of families and 2.7% of the population were below the poverty line, including 3.2% of those under age 18 and 0.5% of those age 65 or over. The median income for a household (est. in 2009) has rose in the town of Canton due to an increase of home sales in the past decade. Canton was listed as one of the fastest-growing towns in Connecticut (c. 2006) and is steadily growing.

== Government and politics ==
Canton town vote by party in presidential elections
Year	Democratic	Republican	Third Parties
2024	57.73% 3,848	40.38% 2,692	1.89% 126
2020	58.22% 3,878	39.98% 2,663	1.08% 120
2016	51.65% 3,100	43.34% 2,601	5.01% 301
2012	51.23% 2,967	47.35% 2,742	1.42% 82
2008	57.13% 3,412	41.39% 2,472	1.47% 88
2004	53.70% 3,003	44.74% 2,502	1.56% 87
2000	50.20% 2,440	42.65% 2,073	7.16% 348
1996	46.14% 2,109	39.27% 1,795	14.59% 667
1992	41.46% 2,118	35.70% 1,824	22.84% 1,167
1988	44.43% 1,995	54.77% 2,459	0.80% 36
1984	36.43% 1,577	63.27% 2,739	0.30% 13
1980	31.03% 1,295	48.08% 2,007	20.89% 872
1976	36.25% 1,344	63.38% 2,350	0.38% 14
1972	33.66% 1,206	65.62% 2,351	0.73% 26
1968	39.38% 1,168	56.00% 1,661	4.62% 137
1964	54.89% 1,464	45.11% 1,203	0.00% 0
1960	37.70% 935	62.30% 1,545	0.00% 0
1956	26.16% 549	73.84% 1,550	0.00% 0

Voter Registration and Party Enrollment as of October 29, 2019
Party	Active Voters	Inactive Voters	Total Voters	Percentage
Republican	2,234	118	2,352	28.91%
Democratic	2,445	113	2,558	31.44%
Unaffiliated	2,950	150	3,110	38.10%
Minor parties	120	6	126	1.55%
Total	7,749	387	8,136	100%

== Transportation ==
The town is served by U.S. Routes 44 and 202, as well as Connecticut Routes 177, 179, and 309. Commuter bus service to Hartford is provided by Connecticut Transit Hartford; a Park & Ride lot is on Old River Road in Collinsville. Intercity train and bus services are provided from Union Station in Hartford, and the nearest large airport is Bradley International Airport, about 13 miles (21 km) away in Windsor Locks.

== Notable people ==
- Lucien Barbour (1811–1880), congressman for Indiana
- Philemon Bliss (1813–1889), congressman for Ohio
- Samuel W. Collins (1802–1871), founder of the Collins Axe Factory for which Collinsville is named
- Danny Hoffman (1880–1922), Major League Baseball player
- Uriel Holmes (1764–1827), congressman for Connecticut
- Merrill I. Mills (1819–1882), mayor of Detroit, Michigan
- Anson Greene Phelps (1781–1853), industrialist and philanthropist
- William E. Simonds (1842–1903), US Civil War veteran, Medal of Honor recipient and congressman for Connecticut
- David Vaudreuil (born 1966), Major League Soccer player and coach
- Annie Withey, co-creator of Smartfood and Annie's Homegrown
