= Economic development of Milford, Connecticut =

Economic development in Milford, Connecticut, has increased the size of the city and added both opportunities and some congestion, which has created controversy.

== In the late Twentieth century ==
During post-World War II period, Milford underwent significant suburbanization. Interstate 95 was routed through the city and the Milford section was completed by 1960.

In a July 2006 article in The Hartford Courant, Milford's community development director, Robert B. Gregory, said "The biggest change to Milford was I-95 with seven exits and entrances."

In the 1960s and '70s, Milford developed further with the construction of the Westfield Connecticut Post Mall, one of the state's largest shopping malls, and the extensive commercial development of the town's stretch of the Boston Post Road.

During this time the city also became host to several headquarters of multinational corporations such as the Subway fast-food corporation and the U.S. headquarters of the Bic Corporation, which has in recent years moved most of its operation outside of the city. In December 2005, the Mountain Development Corporation bought many of Bic's former manufacturing facilities.

== In the Twenty-first century ==
In the summer of 2005, the city's government began the relocation of 174 families from the Ryder Mobile Home Park to create space for the construction of the Milford Crossing plaza. This relocation was met with a large amount of controversy from locals that included protests, nature preserve studies, and court battles. During this same period other projects in Milford were undertaken including an expansion of the Westfield Connecticut Post Mall, the construction of a new hotel, a newly constructed high-end shopping plaza on the old Huffman Koos grounds, and a Lowe's Home Improvement Warehouse store that replaced the space once occupied by Milford Jai-Alai.

Due to the city's location at the mouth of the Housatonic River and bordering the Long Island Sound, The City of Milford's debate of land development versus preservation is a constant challenge that government officials face.

Downtown Milford has undergone a rapid revitalization in the last few decades, with development centered primarily on Daniel Street. New venues such as Café Atlantique, the Daniel Street Club, SBC Restaurant, Stonebridge Restaurant, Cabo, Bistro Basque and a number of smaller businesses account for downtown Milford's new-found popularity in the area. Businesses such as Joey C's Roadhouse opened in Milford but later closed.
