= Canton Center =

Canton Center may refer to:

- Canton Center (MBTA station) in Canton, Massachusetts, United States
- Canton Center Historic District in Canton, Connecticut, United States
