= CT Transit New Britain & Bristol =

CT New Britain and Bristol Divisions

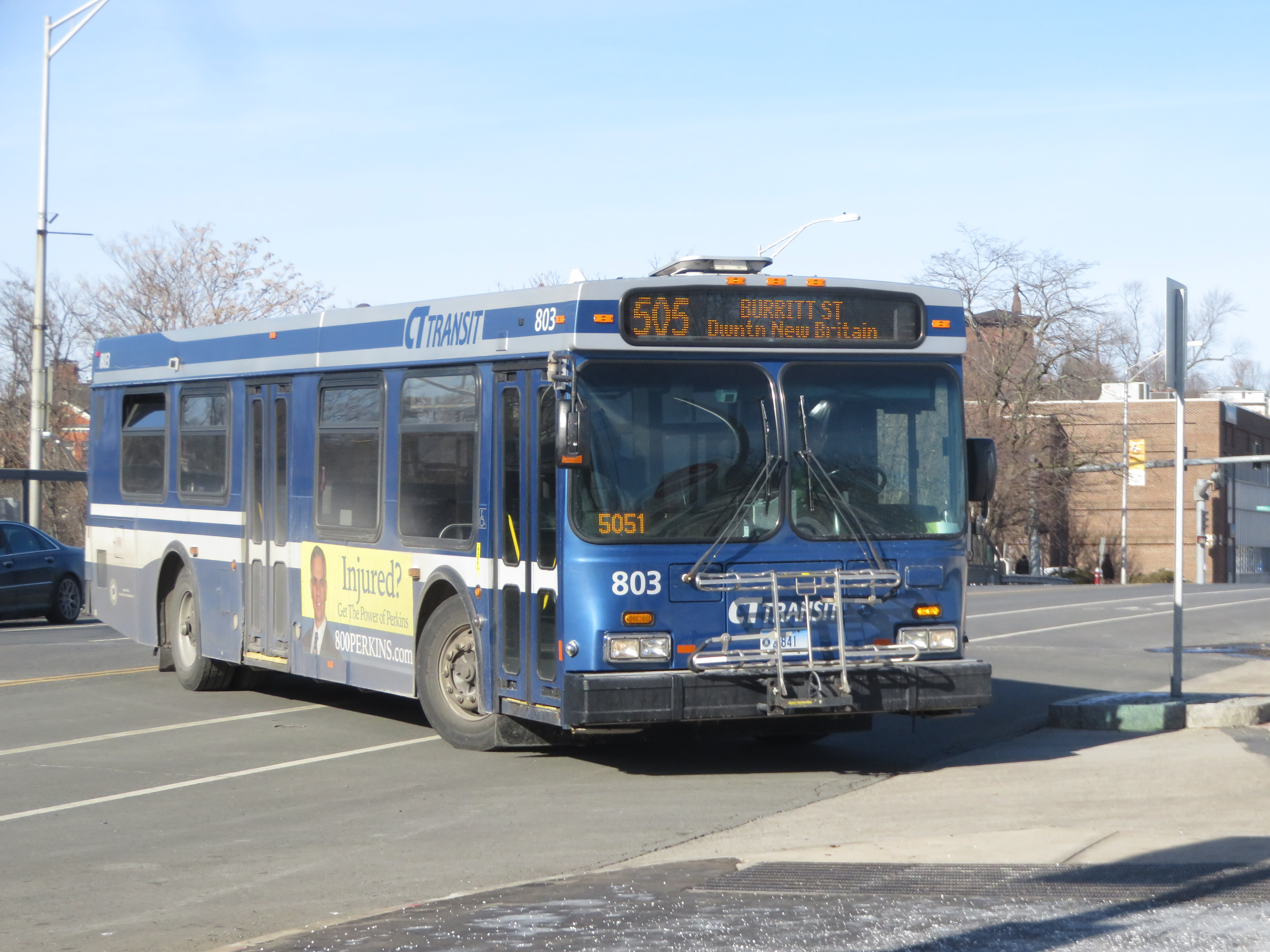
- CT Transit bus 803 at the Downtown New Britain CTfastrak station.
- Founded: 1920 (New Britain Transportation); 1924 (DATTCO)
- Headquarters: New Britain Transportation:: 257 Woodlawn Road; Berlin, CT 06037; DATTCO: 583 South Street; New Britain, CT 06051
- Locale: Connecticut
- Service area: New Britain, Berlin, Bristol, and nearby towns
- Service type: Local bus service
- Routes: New Britain: 11; Bristol:3
- Fleet: 22
- Operator: New Britain Transportation (11 routes); DATTCO (2 routes)
- Chief executive: Peter Agostini (New Britain Transportation); Louis DeVivo (DATTCO)
- Website: Official Website

CT New Britain Division and CT Bristol Division is one division of Connecticut Transit that collectively provides local bus service to four towns in the Central Connecticut Region with connections to CT Transit Hartford Division in downtown New Britain, downtown Bristol, along the Berlin Turnpike, at UConn Health, at Tunxis Community College, CT Transit Waterbury Division and Middletown Area Transit in Cromwell. Service in both divisions operates daily (including major holidays) along 13 routes.

== Routes ==
These are the routes in the New Britain and Bristol Divisions.
As of December 8, 2014, each New Britain or Bristol route is now identified by a numbered route between 501 and 549.

=== New Britain routes ===
Route (new)	Route (old)	Route Name	Outbound terminus	Outbound connections	Notes	Operator	Downtown Hartford: CTtransit Hartford: all routes CTfastrak: 101, 102, 121, 128, 923, 924, 925, 928	DATTCO; CTtransit Hartford
501	AR	Arch Street	501 (AR): Hospital of Central CT-Kensington Avenue; 501C (AR): Hospital of Central CT-Chamberlain Highway		Route 501C to Clinic Drive is the last trip of the day.; Serves CTfastrak's New Britain Station.; Provides through-route service to Route 505 (Burritt Street)	New Britain Transportation		
502	PB/PL	Black Rock Avenue	502 (PB): Bristol City Hall via Plainville Center	Plainville Center: CTtransit New Britain: 503(C) CTfastrak: 102; Downtown Bristol: CTtransit Bristol: 541(BL), 542, 543 CTfastrak: 102, 923		New Britain Transportation		
503	C	Corbin Avenue	503 (C): CT Commons-Tunxis Comm College	Plainville Center: CTtransit New Britain: 502(PB) CTfastrak: 102; Tunxis Community College:CTtransit Bristol: 541(BL) CTtransit Hartford: 66(E)	Through-route service is available with Route 541 at Tunxis Community College (Farmington).	New Britain Transportation		
505	B	Burritt Street	505 (B): Hospital for Special Care-Pinnacle Business Park		Operates outbound from Downtown New Britain via Broad Street and inbound via Myrtle Street; Serves CTfastrak's New Britain Station.; Provides through-route service to Route 501 (Arch Street)	New Britain Transportation		
506	F	Farmington Avenue	506 (F): UCONN Health; 506F (F): Farm Springs-UCONN Health	UConn Health Center: CTtransit Hartford: 66(E) CTfastrak: 121; Batterson Park Park & Ride: CTtransit Hartford: 902 (2)		New Britain Transportation		
507	O	Oak Street	507 (O): CCSU-Country Club Road	CCSU: CTfastrak: 128, 140, 144		New Britain Transportation		
508	S	Stanley Street	Route 508 has been replaced by the new Route 128 (Hartford/New Britain via Westfarms & Stanley Street) in its entirety. Route 128 will then continue to Downtown Hartford via New Britain Avenue in West Hartford (and serves the same stops as Route 39) and the CTfastrak guideway. Although neither Brittany Farms nor Country Club Road will be served by Route 128, passengers can transfer to Route 507 at CCSU for service to Country Club and Alexander Roads or the new Route 144 (Westfarms/Wethersfield via Newington Center) at Westfarms for service to Brittany Farms.			New Britain Transportation		
509	ES	East Street	509 (ES): Dix & Fifth	East Main Street Station (CTfastrak): CTfastrak: 101, 102, 128	Provides through-route service to Route 510 (South Street)	DATTCO		
510	SS	South Street	510 (SS): CT DSS (New Britain); 510C (SS): CT DSS(New Britn)–Corbin Russwin; 510J (SS): CT DSS (New Britn) via John Downey Dr; 510S (SS): Fulton Street		The 510C trips to Corbin Russwin and 510D trips to the New Britain Industrial area (John Downey Drive) operate weekdays only at peak times.; Provides through-route service to Route 509 (East Street)	DATTCO		
511	N/A	New Britain/Meriden		Meriden Transit Center		New Britain Transportation		
512	BK/TPK	South Main Street	512C (BK): Berlin Railroad Station (Amtrak)-Walmart Cromwell-Berlin Turnpike; 512N (FE): NORPACO FOODS via Route 9; 512 (BK): Berlin Railroad Station (Amtrak)-Webster Square	Walmart, Cromwell: Middletown Area Transit: E, M; Price Chopper, Newington:CTtransit Hartford: 45(BTF), 47(T), 69(W)	When Route 45 (Berlin Turnpike Flyer) is unavailable, Hartford area passengers can transfer to Route 512 at Price Chopper/Dick's to get to Walmart (Newington) and Stew Leonard's.	New Britain Transportation		
513	N/A	New Britain/Cromwell				New Britain Transportation		

=== Bristol routes ===
The following routes connect with CTfastrak Route 102 (Hartford/Bristol via New Britain) and 923 (Hartford Express) at the Bristol City Hall:

Route (new)	Route (old)	Route Name	Outbound terminus	Notes
502	PB	Black Rock Avenue	502: Downtown Bristol via Plainville Center	Connects with Route 503 (Corbin Avenue) at Plainville Center.
532	N/A	Queen Street		Effective: 03/10/2014
541	BL	Bristol Local	541B: Tunxis Community College via Birchwood Manor; 541C: Tunxis Community College via Bristol Senior Center	Connects with Routes 66 (Farmington Avenue) to Downtown Hartford at Tunxis Community College.; Through-route service is available with Route 503 (Corbin Avenue) to Downtown New Britain.
542	N/A	Bristol Hospital	542: Bristol Hospital via Goodwin Street	Provides through-route service available to Hartford via CTfastrak Route 102.
543	N/A	West Street	543: Gaylord Towers	

== See also ==
- Connecticut Transit Hartford
- Connecticut Transit New Haven
- Connecticut Transit Stamford
- Northeast Transportation Company

All of the above provide CT Transit route service.
