= Hampton Hill Historic District =

Historic district in Connecticut, United States

- U.S. National Register of Historic Places
- U.S. Historic district
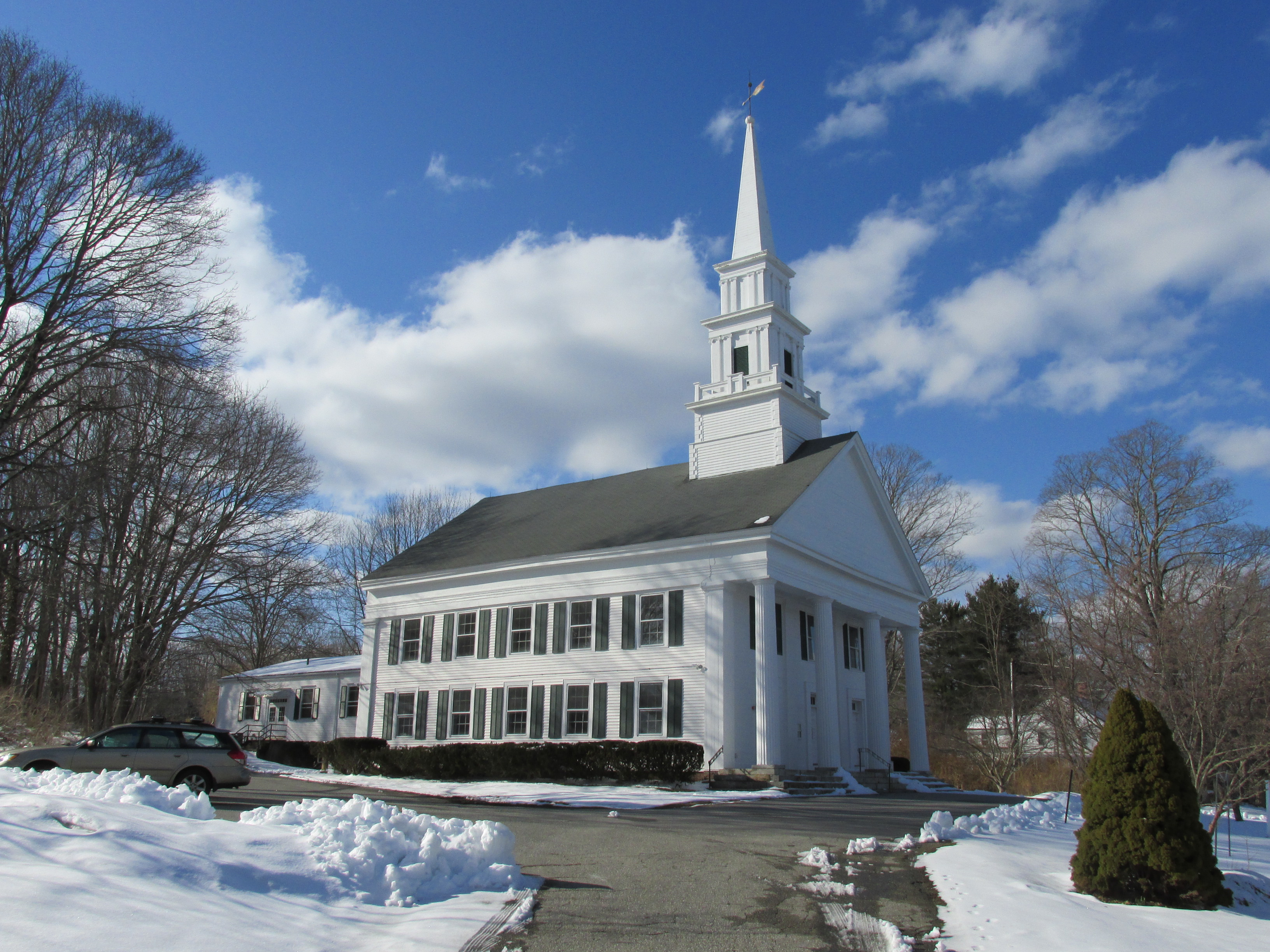
- Congregational Church

- Location within Connecticut Location within the United States
- Location: Main Street, Old Route 6, Cedar Swamp Road, Hampton, Connecticut
- Coordinates: 41°46′57″N 72°3′19″W
- Area: 120 acres (49 ha)
- Architect: Multiple
- Architectural style: Mid 19th Century Revival, Early Republic, Colonial
- NRHP reference No.: 82004408
- Added to NRHP: September 23, 1982

The Hampton Hill Historic District encompasses the historic village center of Hampton, Connecticut, a small rural community in Windham County. It is a linear district, extending for about 1 mile (1.6 km) along Connecticut Route 97, the major north-south route through the town, and laid out as a tree-lined boulevard. Most of the district's 62 historic buildings were built in the 19th century, with fifteen houses surviving from the 18th. Architecturally, they represent a cross-section of styles popular from the mid-18th to early 20th centuries, with vernacular forms most commonly found. One of the oldest buildings is a c. 1727 tavern, since converted to a private residence, while the town hall is located in an undistinguished 1920s former firehouse.

The town of Hampton was first settled in 1709, and the name Hampton Hills became the name of the crossroads village that arose between the main north-south route (now Main Street) and an east-west route (now Old Route 6). Its first church was built here in 1728, and the town was incorporated in 1786, out of portions of adjoining towns. The town remained predominantly agricultural into the 20th century, its population declining over the 19th century. In the 20th century, the population began to grow, but industry and the railroad generally passed by the town center. The result of this development pattern is a well-preserved 19th-century rural village center.

The district was listed on the National Register of Historic Places in 1982.

== See also ==
- National Register of Historic Places listings in Windham County, Connecticut
