= Hemlock Glen Industrial Archeological District =

Archaeological site in Connecticut, United States

- U.S. National Register of Historic Places
- U.S. Historic district
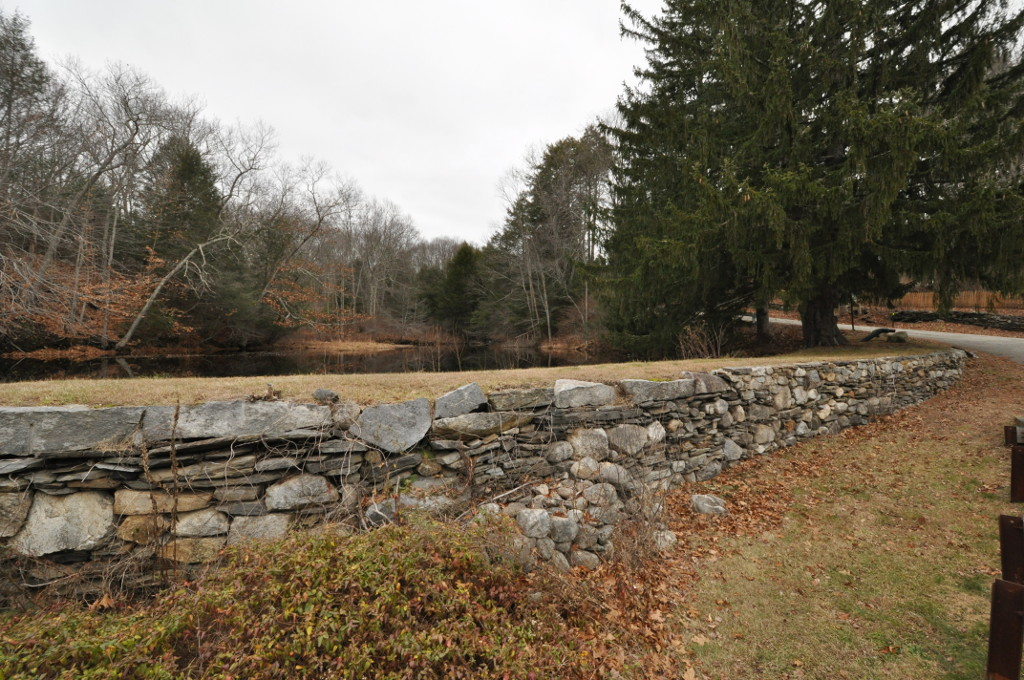
- View of mill pond and remnant stonework
- Location: Hampton, Connecticut
- Area: 6.3 acres (2.5 ha)
- NRHP reference No.: 07000508
- Added to NRHP: June 05, 2007

The Hemlock Glen Industrial Archeological District is a historic industrial archaeological site in Hampton, Connecticut. It consists of a series of mill sites on a tributary of the Shetucket River that operated from the mid-18th to early 20th centuries. The district was added to the National Register of Historic Places in 2007.

== Description ==
The Hemlock Glen area was settled in the first half of the 18th century, with both a sawmill and gristmill built on the banks of the river by 1745. These were substantially rebuilt in 1776 by John Fuller, and were at some point in the 18th century joined by a water-powered blacksmith shop. Fuller sold part of this property in 1814 to the blacksmith, Edward Badger. In the mid-19th century, these properties were adapted by new owners for the manufacture of pins and silver spoons. A tannery was also established, probably in the 1810s, which operated until it was destroyed by fire, likely in the 1850s. The former sawmill and blacksmith sites were abandoned or destroyed by the 1880s, and the gristmill remained in operation until about 1925; it was probably destroyed by flooding in 1938.

The principal surviving features of this industrial activity are the dam and pond of the gristmill, and dams and foundational remnants of the other two sites. The site is of archaeological significance for the close arrangement of the sites (within about 0.5 miles (0.80 km) of one another, and the relatively small water impoundment areas available. Analysis of these features provides some insight into how rural mill owners would have to coordinate their activities to ensure adequate water availability for each site.

== See also ==
- National Register of Historic Places listings in Windham County, Connecticut
