= Annie Withey =

American farmer and entrepreneur

Ann E. "Annie" Withey (born 1963 or 1964) is an American farmer and entrepreneur. Withey developed Smartfood in 1984 and Annie's Homegrown in 1989, both with her husband at the time, Andrew Martin.

Withey graduated from the University of Connecticut in 1986, with a major in English.

They have since sold Smartfood to Frito-Lay and Annie's Homegrown, her titular company, to General Mills.

== Early life ==
Born Ann E. Withey, she grew up in Canton, Connecticut as one of three children and both of her parents were teachers. She attended Canton High School.

== Early career ==
In 1984, she developed the cheddar popcorn recipe as a college student in Boston, in her home kitchen.

In 1985, Withey and Martin started Smartfood, a snack food maker primarily known for attempting to make healthier versions of existing snack food items, popcorn most famously. They sold it to Frito-Lay for about $15 million in 1989.

Annie was interviewed in 1988 by Inc. Magazine about their success with their popcorn company Smartfood, which at the time was seen as an unprecedented success within the snack food world. Tom Protheroe of Hartford Snack Distributors said: "I have never – never – seen a snack-food item catch on like Smartfood has".

== Annie's Homegrown ==
Withey and Martin co-founded Annie's Homegrown in 1989, with their most famous product being Annie's Shells & Cheddar. Withey developed the recipe using the dried cheese powder from Smartfood popcorn, which she had been experimenting with in pursuit of an all-natural cheese popcorn recipe. Withey held onto the idea until she sold Smartfood in 1989 to focus on Annie's.

For a time in the 1990s, Withey's phone number was printed on boxes of Annie's mac and cheese sold in New England as part of her "guerrilla marketing" strategy, which also involved giving away boxes as samples. Withey personally responded to thousands of letters and answered phone calls even in the middle of the night, many people asking for cases of the product. She used her pet bunny Bernie as the brand mascot.

After her daughter's birth in 1997, Withey, having tired of running the business, took to organic farming, selling her produce at local farmer's markets. Wishing to reduce her involvement with the business, Withey accepted a majority investment from Solera Capital in 2002. She remained an employee of the company with the title "inspirational president", though she was no longer involved with the products. In 2014, General Mills bought Annie's Homegrown for $820 million. Though she does not directly work with General Mills, she remains optimistic about the continuation of Annie's brand ideals for environmental and community responsibility.

== Personal life ==
Withey and Martin were married in 1983 when Withey was 20 years old. They divorced in the early 1990s but kept working on their businesses together.

She later married Rob Miller, an organic farmer, and lives on a farm in Hampton, Connecticut, with their two daughters, Molly and Phoebe. As a family, they run Full Moon Farm, which supplies local restaurants and coops. She remained in Connecticut despite Annie's Homegrown relocating its headquarters to Berkeley, California, in 2011. As of 2021, she keeps four cows, seven sheep, a burro, two horses, two flocks of chickens, a dog, and two house rabbits at her early 1900s Victorian-style farmhouse.

She has worked on environmentalism and youth programs for much of her life, and was featured by Vanity Fair in an "Earth People" feature.
