= CT Transit Hartford =

CT Hartford

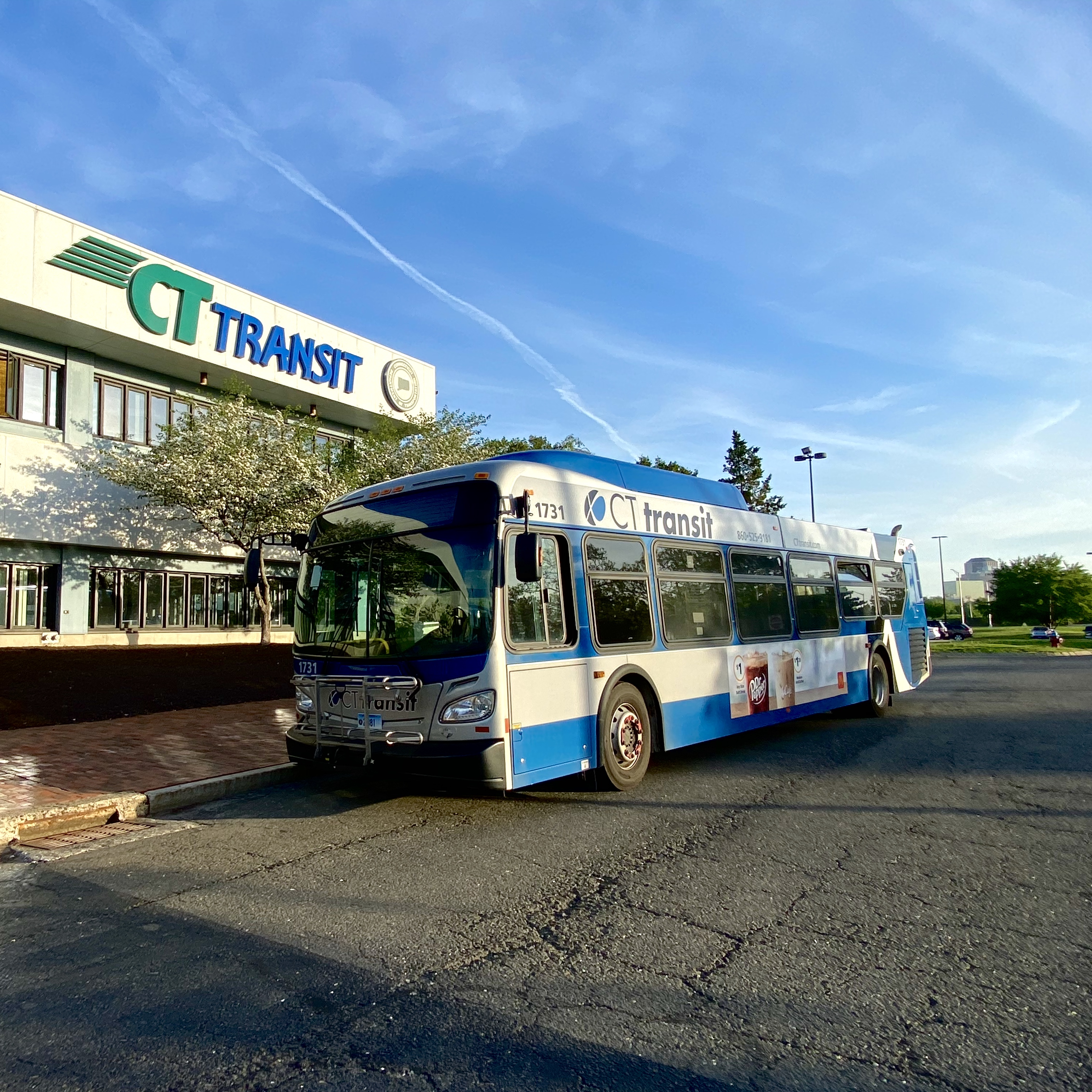
- CTtransit Hartford Division bus #1711 on Route 60 in Hartford.
- Parent: Connecticut Department of Transportation
- Founded: 1976
- Headquarters: 100 Leibert Road; Hartford, CT 06120
- Locale: Connecticut
- Service area: Hartford County
- Service type: Local and express bus service
- Routes: 43 (Including new fleet of 2024 New Flyer XE40 24-series BEB) local 5 flyer 22 express 8 BRT
- Fleet: 308 (CTtransit/CTfastrak branding)
- Operator: First Transit
- Chief executive: Cole Pouliot (general manager)
- Website: www.cttransit.com

CT Hartford is the largest division of Connecticut Transit, providing service on 43 local routes, 5 "flyer" limited stop routes and 18 express routes in 27 towns of Hartford County, including Bloomfield, East Hartford, Farmington, Glastonbury, Manchester, Middletown, Newington, New Britain, Rocky Hill, South Windsor, West Hartford, Wethersfield and Windsor, in addition to Hartford. Service is provided seven days a week in the region, with routes centered on Hartford. The Hartford Division provides connections with local routes in Bristol and New Britain.

Since 1979, the Hartford, New Haven and Stamford divisions of CTtransit have been operated by First Transit.

== Routes ==
For CTfastrak Routes 101-161 and Express Routes 923-925 & 928, see the CTfastrak page.

Express Routes All routes in the CTtransit system, regardless of the operator, are numbered 901-999

Route (new)	Route (old)	Route name	New Route Number & Terminus	Notes
901	1	Avon-Canton Express	901 (1): Avon-Canton; 901A (1A): Avon	Originally served Canton Town Garage until service was rerouted to serve the then-new Canton Park-n-ride on November 27, 2006.; One AM & PM round-trip only; Midday and most peak service consolidated with the 926 & 927 routes on August 22, 2021.
902	2	Farm Springs Express	902 (2): Corbins-Farm Springs	Connects with CTtransit New Britain Route 506F at the Batterson Park Park & Ride in Farmington.; Connects with CTfastrak Routes 121, 128, and 144 at the Corbins Park & Ride in New Britain.; Service to Corbins Park & Ride eliminated on August 22, 2021
903	3	Buckland Express	903 (3/17): Buckland-Vernon Express; 903B (3): Buckland Only Express	The 903/917 (formerly 3/17) express bus is operated by Collins Bus Service.; Route originally had midday service in both directions; Midday service to Hartford was discontinued when midday service was combined with the Vernon Express (which operates only from Hartford) in January 2005; Select evening busses will terminate at the Buckland Park and Ride and continue service as Route 83 to Hartford.; Route was extended to Vernon and replaced 917 service on August 22, 2021
904	4	Glastonbury Express	904 (4P): Glastonbury; 904S (4): Glastonbury-South Glastonbury; 904/914 (4/14): Glastonbury (St. Paul's Only)-Marlborough-Colchester	Originally had a variant (labeled 4/8) that ran to Hebron Avenue to St Dustan's Church; eliminated in May 2003; Connects with Route 95 outside of the Fox Run Mall in Glastonbury.; Service to South Glastonbury eliminated on August 22, 2021.
905	5	Enfield-Windsor Locks Express	905 (5): Windsor Locks-Enfield; 905 (5): Windsor Locks-Enfield-Thompsonville-Mass Mutual Connection to Springfield	905S Service to Somers Correctional Facilities discontinued on August 22, 2021.; 905E and 905W variants discontinued on August 22, 2021.
906	6	Cromwell Express	906 (6): Cromwell	Connects with Middletown Area Transit routes 584 (D), 585 (E), and 590 (M).; Connects with CTtransit route 512.; Originally ran to Middletown; service truncated to Cromwell in May 2003.; Midday and some peak service consolidated with the 919 route on August 22, 2021
909	9	Farmington-Unionville Express	909 (9): Farmington-Unionville	
910	10	Rocky Hill-Century Hills Express	910 (10): Rocky Hill-Century Hills	Runs in conjunction with Route 47R to Century Hills.
912	11	Simsbury-Granby Express	912 (11): Simsbury-Granby	
913	***new***	Buckland-Storrs Express	913: Buckland-Storrs; 913X: Storrs/Hartford Union Station	Service starts on Monday August 14, 2017.; Connects with Routes 80, 82, 83, 91, 92, and 903 at Buckland Park & Ride and Buckland Hills Mall in Manchester.; Connects with WRTD at UConn Main Campus to Willimantic.; Additional service provided by Peter Pan Bus Lines' Hartford-Providence service.
914	14	Marlborough-Colchester Express	914 (14): Marlborough-Colchester; 914C (14C): Colchester; 914M (14M): Marlborough; 904/914 (4/14): Glastonbury-Marlborough-Colchester	Midday Service rerouted to Serve Glastonbury on April 23, 2006
918	18 (nee 30 & 31)	Coventry-Willimantic Express	918 (18, nee 30): Willimantic; 918C (18C, nee 31): Coventry	Operated by Peter Pan/Arrow.; Connection to WRTD in Willimantic available.; Reverse-peak and midday service (to Hartford) was added on August 22, 2021; Additional weekday, and new weekend service provided by Peter Pan's Hartford-Providence service started August 22, 2021.
919	19 (nee 60)	Meriden Express	919 (19, nee 60): Meriden	Operated by DATTCO.; Service between Centennial Plaza and Bee Street Park & Ride in Meriden discontinued on August 22, 2021; Service rerouted via Cromwell (replacing some 906 trips) on August 22, 2021.; Service to Country Club Road Park & Ride added on August 22, 2021.
921	21 (nee 40)	Middletown-Old Saybrook Express	921 (21, nee 40): Middletown-Old Saybrook	Operated by DATTCO.; Connects with CTtransit Hartford 55 route at the Silver St Park & Ride (Middletown).; Connects with 9-Town Transit and ShoreLine East in Old Saybrook.; Reverse-peak and midday service (to Hartford) was added on August 22, 2021
923	23	Bristol Express	923 (23): Bristol	Operated by DATTCO.; Rerouted away from I-84 via CT Fastrak Busway to/from Hartford in April 2015; Midday and reverse-peak service added in April 2015, eliminated on August 22,2021
926	26 (nee 70)	Winsted Express	926 (26, nee 70): Winsted	Formerly operated by Kelley Transit.; Operated by Hartford starting February 2019.; Midday consolidated 926/927 service to Hartford and reverse-peak service added on August 22, 2021; Stops in Avon and Canton added to replace most 901 service on August 22, 2021
927	27 (nee 71)	Torrington Express	927 (27, nee 71): Torrington	Formerly operated by Kelley Transit.; Operated by Hartford starting February 2019.; Midday consolidated 926/927 service to Hartford and reverse-peak service added on August 22, 2021; Stops in Avon and Canton added to replace most 901 service on August 22, 2021; Connection available to Route 450X: Waterbury
928	None	Southington-Cheshire-Waterbury Express	928 : Southington-Cheshire-Waterbury	Operated by DATTCO.; Service originated in April 2015, operating at except rush hours in the peak direction; Peak direction service added to replace former 924 and 925 routes on August 22,2021
950	20 (nee 42)	New Haven Express	950 (20, nee 42): New Haven	Operated by Peter Pan/Arrow.; Connection available with CTtransit New Haven route 224 at the Devine St Park & Ride in North Haven.; Meriden Transit Center stop added to replace route 919 on August 22, 2021.; Rush hour peak direction service to/from Hartford from Country Club Road Park & Ride discontinued on August 22, 2021.

Former Express Routes

Route (new)	Route (old)	Route name	New Route Number & Terminus	Notes
902C	2C	Corbins Express	902C (2C): Corbins	Connected with CTfastrak Routes 121, 128, and 144 at the Corbins Park & Ride in New Britain.; Service eliminated on August 22, 2021.
905E, 905W, 905S, 905/915	5E/W/S	Enfield-Somers-Windsor Locks Express	905E (5E): Enfield; 905E (5E): Enfield-Thompsonville-Mass Mutual Connection to Springfield; 905S (5S): Enfield-Somers (Non-Holiday weekends only); 905W (5W): Windsor Locks; 905W (5W): Windsor Locks-North St; 905/915 (5/15): Windsor-Windsor Locks-Enfield; 905-915 (5/15): Windsor-Windsor Locks-Enfield-Thompsonville; 905E/915: Windsor-Enfield	Route 905E connected with PVTA Route G5 to Springfield, MA at Mass Mutual.; Route 905E connected with the Magic Carpet (Enfield) Transit bus routes at Enfield Square Park & Ride.; Route 905W serves C&S Wholesale Grocers and H.P. Hood in Suffield on select trips (effective Dec. 14, 2015).; Routes eliminated on August 22, 2021, when all peak and midday 905 service was streamlined to operate via both Windsor Locks and Enfield Square.
907	7	Newington Express	907 (7): Newington	Stopped outside of the CTDOT; Service eliminated on August 25, 2024; last day of operation August 23, 2024; Service to Newington Park & Ride served by new Route 125 on weekdays only
912S	11S	Simsbury Express	912S (11S): Simsbury; 54X: BLUE HILLS EXT-Monrovia Nursery-Granby	Service notation eliminated when all service extended to Granby on August 22, 2021
915	15	Windsor Express	915 (15): Windsor; 905/915 (5/15): Windsor-Windsor Locks-Enfield; 905E-915 **new**: Windsor-Enfield	Service eliminated on August 22, 2021, replaced by local bus service to/from Hartford, and some 905 trips to/from Enfield Square
917	17 (nee 50)	Vernon-Tolland Express	917 (17, nee 50): Vernon; 917T (17, nee 50): Vernon-Tolland; 903/917T (3/17, nee 3/50): Buckland-Vernon	Operated by Collins Bus Service.; Service to Exit 68 Park-and-Ride in Tolland began on September 23, 2013; Service replaced by routes 903 and 913 on August 22, 2021

Local routes
All local CTtransit buses in the Hartford area, except for Routes 91 and 92, start or end in Downtown Hartford.

Route	Route name	Old Route Letter (until 2009)	New Route Number & Terminus	Notes	
30	Bradley Flyer	BDL	30X: Bradley Int'l Airport via I-91; 30N: Retired August 2021.	Serves the Hartford Union Station & Connecticut Convention Center (Effective 11/14/2010).; Route 30N operates late nights and early mornings only. Retired in August 2021; Slated to become full express service with dedicated fleet by Winter 2018. Plan was later scrapped.; All stops are made to the Connecticut Convention Center and Poquonock Park and Ride both inbound and outbound.; Runs every 40 minutes during the day Monday through Saturdays.; No longer service Kennedy Road. Refer to Route 34.; Only service Ella Grasso Turnpike as an outbound route.	
31	Park St-New Park Ave	K3; K3A; K3B; K/A	31: West Hartford Place; 31A: West Hartford Place via Kane St Retired March 10, 2023; 31B: West Hartford Place-Charter Oak Marketplace (renamed as 31); 31/63: Hillside Ave (Retired March 11, 2023)	31 runs at 12:45 am on Sunday and Monday mornings.; Serves the following CTfastrak stations: Parkville, Kane St., and Flatbush Ave.; Continues to Route 42 (Barbour St).; All 31 will travel on New Park Avenue to W. Hartford Place outbound, and continue inbound stopping at Charter Oak Marketplace on all stops. Similar to the 31B.; Route 31/63 is the last bus trip (12:40 a.m.) of the night. Retired March 11, 2023; 31A, W. Hartford Place via Kane Street retired on March 10, 2023.	
32	Windsor Ave	N2 N6 N2	32: Windsor Avenue; 32B: Windsor Center-Bloomfield Ave; 32M: Windsor Center via Matianuck Ave	All trips on Route 32 continue to the Poquonock Park & Ride in Windsor, except routes 32B, and 32M.; Goes on Windsor Street instead of Weston Street.; Route 32/40 operates on nights and Sundays only. Retired on August 21, 2021; Operates daily with extended services.; Starts and End at Central Row.; Starts at Central Row into Market Street.; Continues to Route 43 (Campfield Ave).; 32B operates only on weekday mornings. It goes from Windsor station (Connecticut), then heads inbound starting Bloomfield Avenue, Matianuck Ave, Bina Ave, and on Windsor Avenue.; 32M operates only on weekday afternoons. It is the reversal of Route 32B.	
33	Park St-Park Rd	K4; K5	33:Trout Brook Drive; 33W: Westfarms	Serves the CTfastrak Parkville Station.; Continues to Route 40 (North Main St).	
34	Kennedy Road via I-91	N3	34: Kennedy Road; 34A: Kennedy Road to Halfway House Road 34X: Kennedy Road via I-91.	Service I-91 both inbound and Outbound. Refer to Routes 32, and 36 for any service on Windsor Avenue; Serves Poquonock Park & Ride in Windsor.; 34X goes on Weston Street but continues on I-91 North.; No longer continues on Poquonock Avenue after going through Poquonock Park and Ride (aka the Bradley Connector). Refer to Route 24; Goes on Kennedy Road in place of Routes 30X, and 905.; Service on Old County Road, and Ella Grasso Turnpike.; Still service International Drive.; Starts and End at Central Row.; Start at Central Row and continues on Market Street on Outbound Routes; Runs Daily.	
35	Westfarms Flyer	WFM	35X: Westfarms via I-84	The Westfarms Flyer has been discontinued on Sunday December 13, 2015, due to low ridership. The last trip ever on the Westfarms Flyer left Downtown Hartford at 10:45 p.m. on Saturday December 12, 2015. Routes 33W, 39W, 64W, and CTfastrak Routes 128 and 144 will still provide service to Westfarms 7 days a week.	
36	Windsor Ave-Day Hill Rd	N7; N7x	36: Griffin Center; 36X: DAY HILL RD-Griffin Center via I-91	Serves the Poquonock Park & Ride in Windsor.; Continues to Route 43 (Campfield Ave).; Starts & Ends its run at North Griffin Road. Services Voya, Addison Corporate, and Amazon Fulfillment Center.; Starts and Ends at Central Row.; Starts at Central Row and continues into Market Street.; No longer turns into the Route 54 from Poquonock Park & Ride at 9:35 pm and 11:35 pm.; Weekdays only.	
37	New Britain Ave via Jefferson St	Q4; A	37: Charter Oak Marketplace; 63: HILLSIDE AVE-Charter Oak Marketplace	Route 37 serves Hartford Hospital and CT Children's Medical Center. On weekdays only, route 37 also serves West Hartford Place.; Connects to CTfastrak Route 153: Flatbush Ave Station, Elmwood Center, West Hartford Center, and Copaco Center.; Continues to Route 46 (Vine St).; Extended Weeknight and Saturday Night Service	
38	Weston St	W3; W4	38: CTTRANSIT-Post Office; 38C: CTtransit	38: CTTRANSIT- Post Office operates on weekdays only.; Starts at Central Row Northside, continues up Pearl Street, into Ann Uccello as an outbound route.; Goes on Market street inbound to start at Central Row.	
39	New Britain Ave via Retreat Ave	Q3; Q2	39: Elmwood Center (Retired on November 4, 2022); 39W: Westfarms	Serves the CTfastrak Elmwood Station.; Serves Hartford Hospital.; All stops lead to Westfarms Mall.; Continues to Route 46 (Vine St).; Continues to Route 94 (Park Ave) on Sundays.; Extended Weeknight Service	
40	North Main St	K2; K/T; BDL; N2	40: CT DSS (Hartford)–Wilson Park & Ride; 40/52: Blue Hills Ave(Retired in August 2021)	Route 40/52 is the last bus trip (12:40 a.m.) of the night. Retired in August 2021.; Only an outbound route at 12:45 am On Sunday and Monday morning (Overnight on weekends).; Continues to Route 33 (Park St).	
41	Hartford/New Britain	P1; N/A	41(P1): New Britain via Newington Center; HNB: Hartford/New Britain via I-84	Co-operated by DATTCO.; Connects to all New-Britain area routes in Downtown New Britain.	
42	Barbour St	K1	42: Tower Ave; 42/46: Tower Ave-Coventry St	Additional weeknight and Saturday night service.; The combined Route 42/46 operates all day on Sundays.; Continues to Route 31 (Park St).	
43	Campfield Ave	N1	43: Folly Brook Blvd-Wolcott Hill Park & Ride	Continues to Routes 32, & 36 (Windsor Ave).; No Service on Sundays	
44	Garden St	S2	44: Charlotte St-Unity Plaza	Continues to Route 59 Monday to Saturdays	
45	Berlin Tpke Flyer	Retired August 24, 2024	BTF	45X: Stew Leonard's via I-91; 45X: CTDOT-Stew Leonard's via I-91; 45X: CTDOT-Stew Leonard's-Eversource via I-91	Supplemental service for the 47B bus.; Connection available in Newington to New Britain (Route 512).; Retired on August 24, 2024. Refer to CT Fastrak Route 125 for any service on the Berlin Turnpike.
46	Vine St	Q1; K1	46: Coventry St-Elizabeth Ave; 42/46: BARBOUR ST-Tower Ave-Coventry St	Stops in front of the Northend Senior Center on Coventry St. in Hartford (all times).; The combined Route 42/46 operates only on Sundays.; Continues to Routes 37 and 39 (New Britain Ave).; Additional weeknight and Saturday night service.	
47	Franklin Ave	T3; T9 T1 T3 T/F	47: Wolcott Hill Park & Ride-Jordan Ln; 47B: Berlin Tpke-CTDOT; 47B: Berlin Tpke. Retired August 24, 2024. 47R: Rose Hill; 47R: Rose Hill-Corporate Ridge; 47W: Silas Deane Hwy-Wethersfield Shop Ctr (nights & Sunday only); 47/61: Jordan Ln-Broad St	Route 47B retired August 2024. Please refer to CT_Fastrak Route 125 for any service on the Berlin Turnpike; Route 47W serves Silas Deane Hwy. in Wethersfield. Operates weeknights, Saturday night, and All Day Sunday.; Route 47W operates every 35 minutes on Sundays only.; Route 47/61 is the last bus trip (12:40 a.m.) of the night (weeknights only); Route 47R operates on weekdays only; Continues to Routes 50, 52, and 54 (Blue Hills Ave).	
50	Blue Hills Ave-Cottage Grove Rd	T4; T5; T6	50A: Copaco–Cigna/MetLife; 50B: Copaco–Bloomfield Center; 50C: Copaco	Route 50A operates on weekdays only. Starts and End at Cigna and Metlife.; Route 50B runs daily to substitute the retired route 92B that used to go to Sacred Heart Park and Ride on Saturdays; 50C ends and starts at Copaco Shopping Center in Bloomfield, CT.; Continues to Route 47 (Franklin Ave).	
52	Blue Hills Ave	T7; T8; K/T	52R: Rockwell Corner; 52W: Wedgewood Dr; 40/52: NORTH MAIN ST-Blue Hills Ave (Retired in August 2021)	Route 40/52 is the last bus trip (12:40 a.m.) of the night. Retired in August 2021. Refer to 50C that departs at 12:45 am.; Continues to Route 47 (Franklin Ave).	
53	Wethersfield Ave	U1; U2; U7; T3	53: Jordan Ln; 53W: DMV-Old Weth-Wethersfield Shop Ctr-Exec Sq; 55: MIDDLETOWN via Wethersfield Ave & Silas Deane Hwy; 47W: FRANKLIN AVE-Silas Deane Hwy-Wethersfield Shop Ctr	Continues to Route 56 (Bloomfield Ave) or Route 58 (Albany Ave).	
54	Blue Hills Ave-Blue Hills Ext	T10; T10x	54: Blue Hills Ext; 54X: Amazon via I-91; 54X: BLUE HILLS EXT via I-91	Serves the Amazon Fulfillment Center on Iron Ore Rd in Windsor before ending at the Poquonock Park & Ride on Weekends only.; Continues to Route 47 (Franklin Ave).; Route 54 local operates 7 days a week; Route 54X operates daily and ends at Amazon.; 54 does not service North and South Griffin Road on weekends.; 54X doesn't service North and South Griffin Road.; 54X doesn't operate as an inbound route on weekend evenings	
55	Middletown	U7; M1&U7x	55: Wethersfield Ave-Silas Deane Hwy.-Downtown Middletown; 55X: Silas Deane Hwy.-Downtown Middletown via I-91	No service on Sundays; limited Saturday service available.; Route U7x Express (now Route 55X) runs the former M1 route to Middletown.; Some trips serve Connecticut Valley Hospital on Silver Street.; Connection available to the Middletown Area Transit buses, 9-Town Transit to Old Saybrook, and Express Route 921.; Continues to Route 56 (Bloomfield Ave) & Route 58 (Albany Ave).	
56	Bloomfield Ave	U4; U6; U5	56B: Bloomfield Center; 56D: Dorothy Dr; 56F: Federation Home	Serves the University of Hartford.; Continues to Route 53 (Wethersfield Ave) & Route 55 (Middletown).	
58	Albany Ave	U3; S	58: Bishops Corner; 58A: Mark Twain Dr	Continues to Route 53 (Wethersfield Ave) & Route 55 (Middletown); Connects with Routes 62, 72, and 153 at Bishops Corner.	
59	Locust St	G1	59: Brainard Ind Park-Regional Market	Continues to Route 44 during the weekday.; Provides service to Trinity Health Stadium	
60	Farmington Ave	E	60: West Hartford Center	Only runs as the last Farmington Avenue bus daily.; Runs 3 times during the weeknights and once on weekends.	
61	Broad St	F2; F4; F3; T/F	61: Jordan Ln; 61D: Silas Deane Hwy; 61R: Ridge Rd; 47/61: FRANKLIN AVE-Jordan Ln-Broad St	Route 47/61 is the last bus trip (12:40 a.m.) of the night. Weeknights; Service along Jordan Lane in Wethersfield 7 days a week is provided by CTfastrak Route 144.	
62	Farmington Ave-North Main St	E2	62: Bishops Corner		
63	Hillside Ave	A3; A K/A	63: Charter Oak Marketplace; 63M: Mountain St; 31/63: PARK ST-New Park Ave-Hillside Ave (Retired on March 11, 2023)	Connects to CTfastrak Route 153: Flatbush Ave Station, West Hartford Place, West Hartford Center, and Copaco Center.; Route 31/63 is the last bus trip (12:40 a.m.) of the night. Retired on March 11, 2023	
64	Farmington Ave-South Main St	E5; E3	64: Webster Hill Blvd (Retired on August 6, 2022); 64W: Westfarms		
66	Farmington Ave-Farmington	E8; E6; E1; E7	66: Westgate; Health-Unionville; 66H: UConn Health; 66T: UConn Health-Tunxis Comm College	Service to the UConn Health Center 7 days a week is provided by CTfastrak Route 121.; 66T connects to Route 503 and 541 at Tunxis Community College on weekdays only; 66 going to Westgate only operates on Sundays	
69	Capitol Ave	N/A; W2	69F: Capitol Avenue via Fenn Road Veterans' Hospital	No longer goes on the Berlin_Turnpike to the Connecticut Department of Transportation in Newington Connecticut. Refer to CT Fastrak Route 125 for any service on the Berlin Turnpike.; Starts and End at the Newington VA Medical Center.; Services both the Newington Junction, and Cedar Street Station in the same run.; No Sunday Service.; Goes through Elmwood Center along with routes 39W, and 128	
72	Asylum Ave	A1; A2	72A: Bishops Corner-Cigna/MetLife; 72F: Fern St	Weekdays only.; Additional weeknight service for the 72A.; Turns to Route 87 on weekdays.	
74	Granby St	S1; S	74: Copaco-Seabury; 74C: Copaco; 74W: Copaco-Wedgewood Dr	Serves St Francis Hospital.; Route 74C service operates only when school is in session.; Doesn't operate on Sundays.	
76	Ashley St	F1; F	76: St Francis Hosp-Bowles Park; 76C: St Francis Hosp-Copaco	Route 76C service operates on nights and Sundays only.	
80	Buckland Flyer	BKM	80X: Buckland Hills via I-84	Saturdays only, except during the holiday season.; Additional Service on Saturday Mornings.; Converts to Route 87 on Saturdays	
82	Tolland St-Buckland Hills	Z3; Z2	82: Buckland Hills; 82/84: Buckland Hills-Rockville	Trips start/end at the Union Station Transit Center on Union Place.; Route 82/84 is a combined service route to Buckland Hills and Rockville, operating weeknights after 6:00 p.m. and all day on weekends.	
83	Silver Ln	B1; B2; B3; B4; N/A	83A: Manchester Business Pk via MCC; 83B: Manchester Business Pk via McKee St; 83C: Buckland Hills via MCC; 83D: Buckland Hills via McKee St; 83E: Buckland Hills	Trips start/end at the Union Station Transit Center on Union Place.; On weekdays only, Route 83 serves the Spencer Street Park & Ride.; Service bypasses MCC on Sundays only.; Service to MCC is also operated by Route 85, and MCC via Silver Lane by CTfastrak Route 121.; 83E only operates on Sundays; 83A and 83B only operates on Weekdays	
84	Tolland St-Rockville	Z1; Z2	84: Rockville; 82/84:Buckland Hills-Rockville	Trips start/end at the Union Station Transit Center on Union Place.; Route 82/84 is a combined service route to Buckland Hills and Rockville, operating weeknights after 6:00 p.m. and all day on weekends.	
85	MCC Flyer	Bx	85X: MCC via I-84	Operates only during fall and spring semesters on weekdays only (late August to May).; Doesn't operate on most federal holidays except Columbus Day, and Veterans Day and it's observed days.; Additional service to MCC is also operated by CTfastrak Route 121 and Route 83.	
86	Burnside Ave	Y3; Y4	86: Mayberry Village via Scotland Rd; 86R: Mayberry Village via Roberts St	Weekdays only.	
87	Brewer St	J J1 J2	87: EAST RIVER DR-Founders Plaza; 87F: Founders Plaza-Forest St; 87G: EAST RIVER DR-Founders Plaza-Goodwin College; 87H: Founders Plaza-Hills St	87H retired August 23, 2024; 87F, and 87G operate on weekdays.; 87F now extends to Manchester Community College (Connecticut) now known as CT State Manchester; No longer stops on Market Street heading inbound. Continues off on the Bulkeley Bridge to go in Main and Asylum Streets to convert to Route 72 on weekdays; Turns to the 80X on Saturdays	
88	Burnside Ave-Manchester	YM; YM2; YM1	88: Manchester Center via Center St; 88C: Lydall St via Center St; 88M: CT DSS (Manchester) via Middle Tpke West		
91	Forbes St Crosstown	X1⇋X2	91: Buckland Hills⇋Putnam Bridge Plaza⇋Wethersfield Shop Ctr	Serves Town Line Rd. in Rocky Hill (Walmart/Stop & Shop).; Continues to Route 92 from Buckland Hills (Mon-Sat).	
92	Tower Ave Crosstown	L1⇋L2; L1⇋L3	92: Buckland Hills⇋South Windsor⇋Copaco; 92: Buckland Hills	Stops in front of the Northend Senior Center on Coventry St. in Hartford (weekdays only).; No longer continues to Bloomfield Center on Saturdays. Refer to route 50B; Continues to Route 91 from Buckland Hills.; Stops at South Windsor Park and Ride both inbound and outbound along with Route 96; No service on Sundays.	
94	Park Ave	H2	94: Prestige Park	AM: Outbound via Prestige Park, inbound via Goodwin.; PM & Sundays: Outbound via Goodwin, inbound via Prestige Park.; Turns to the 39W on Sundays	
95	Glastonbury	O O1; O2 O3	95: MAIN ST-High & Brewer; 95A: O'CONNELL DR-Country Ln; 95C: Glastonbury Center via Welles Village; 95C: Glastonbury Center via Main St; 95H: Hubbard St; 95P: MAIN ST-Putnam Bridge Plaza-Somerset Square	Morning trips to Glastonbury and afternoon trips from Glastonbury serve the Industrial Park area.; On weekends, Route 95 makes a side trip to Goodwin College to or from the Glastonbury area.	
96	John Fitch Blvd	H1	96: East Windsor Hill via Nutmeg Rd South; 96: East Windsor Hill via Main St; 96E: Warehouse Point	AM: Returns to Hartford via Main St. in South Windsor.; PM: Returns to Hartford via Nutmeg Rd. South in South Windsor.; 96E services Warehouse Point in East Windsor, and Windsor Locks Railroad Station on weekdays only; Stops at S. Windsor Park and Ride (Except for Saturday afternoons); No service on Sundays	

Other routes

Route name	Old Route Letter/Name	Type of Service	Notes
Rockville Shuttle	ZZ	Sunday shuttle service between Depot Square in Manchester and Rockville.	* Discontinued on Sept. 11, 2016 due to the extension of Route 82 to Rockville.
dash	Star Shuttle	Downtown Hartford loop serving CT Convention Center, PeoplesBank Arena, Union Station, and Capital Community College.	

== See also ==
- Connecticut Transit New Britain and Bristol
- Connecticut Transit New Haven
- Connecticut Transit Stamford
- Northeast Transportation Company

All of the above provide CTtransit route service.
