= Canton Valley, Connecticut =

Census-designated place in Connecticut, United States

- Census-designated place
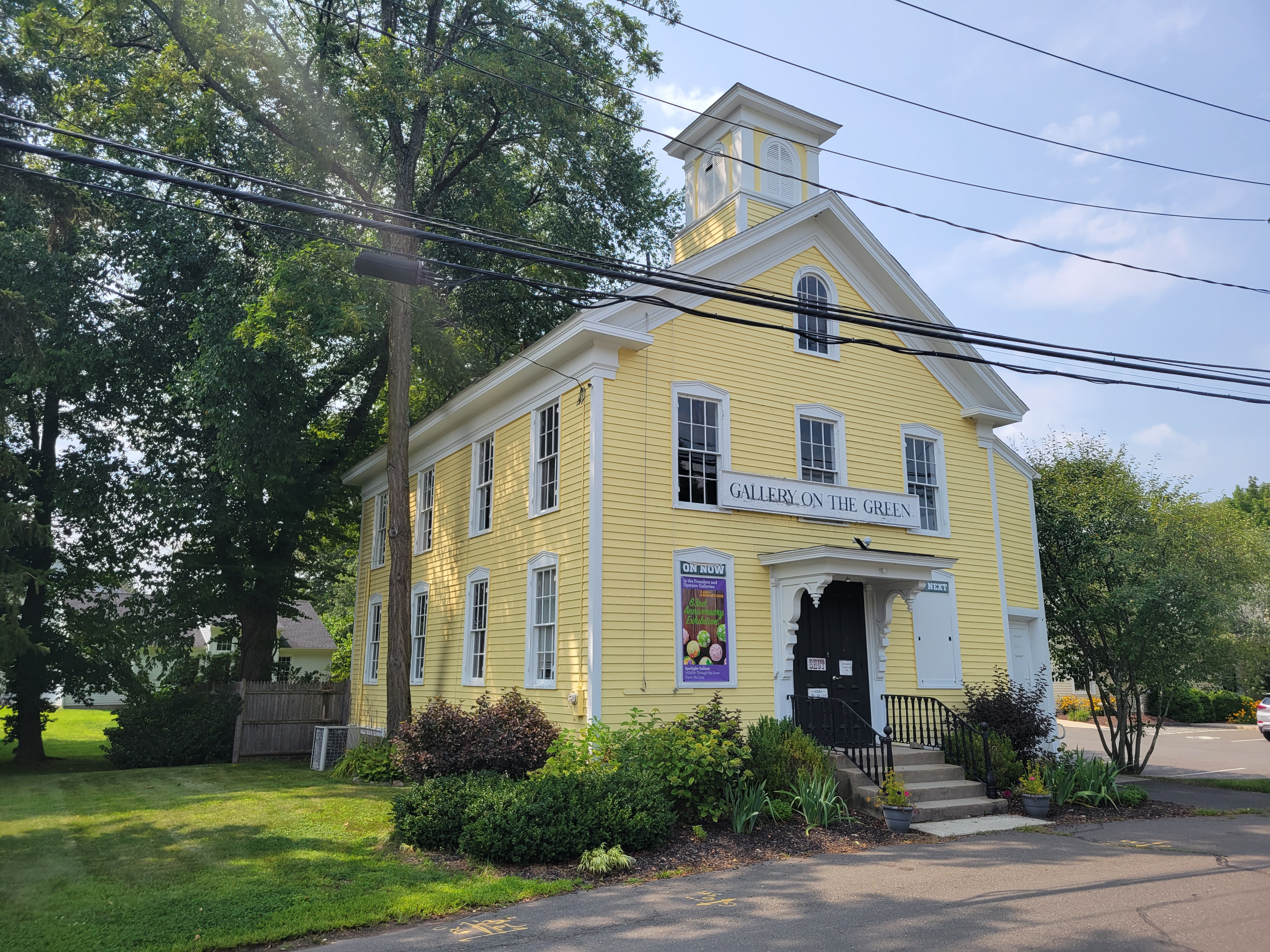
- Gallery on the Green

- Location within Connecticut Location within the United States
- Coordinates: 41°49′27″N 72°53′36″W
- Country: United States
- State: Connecticut
- County: Hartford
- Town: Canton

Area
  - Total: 1.8 sq mi (4.6 km^{2})
  - Land: 1.8 sq mi (4.6 km^{2})
  - Water: 0 sq mi (0.0 km^{2})
- Elevation: 342 ft (104 m)

Population (2017)
  - Total: 1,489
  - Density: 840/sq mi (320/km^{2})
- Time zone: UTC-5 (Eastern)
  - Summer (DST): UTC-4 (Eastern)
- ZIP code: 06019
- Area code: 860
- FIPS code: 09-12370
- GNIS feature ID: 2378341

Canton Valley (commonly known simply as Canton) is a village and census-designated place (CDP) in the town of Canton in Hartford County, Connecticut, United States. As of the 2020 census, Canton Valley had a population of 1,623.

== Geography ==
Canton Valley ("Canton") is located in the southern part of the town of Canton. U.S. Route 202 and U.S. Route 44 run in a concurrency as the Albany Turnpike, the main road through the center of the village, leading east to Avon and west to Torrington (US 202) and northwest to Winsted (US 44). Connecticut Route 177 (Lovely Street) leads south from Canton Valley to Unionville. Dowd Avenue leads southwest from Canton Valley to Collinsville, the largest community in the town of Canton.

According to the United States Census Bureau, the Canton Valley CDP has a total area of 1.8 square miles (4.6 km^{2}), all land.

== Demographics ==
=== 2020 census ===
As of the 2020 census, Canton Valley had a population of 1,623. The median age was 48.8 years. 18.8% of residents were under the age of 18 and 19.3% of residents were 65 years of age or older. For every 100 females there were 92.1 males, and for every 100 females age 18 and over there were 91.3 males age 18 and over.

100.0% of residents lived in urban areas, while 0.0% lived in rural areas.

There were 763 households in Canton Valley, of which 22.3% had children under the age of 18 living in them. Of all households, 42.6% were married-couple households, 20.3% were households with a male householder and no spouse or partner present, and 31.8% were households with a female householder and no spouse or partner present. About 38.8% of all households were made up of individuals and 19.6% had someone living alone who was 65 years of age or older.

There were 815 housing units, of which 6.4% were vacant. The homeowner vacancy rate was 2.7% and the rental vacancy rate was 3.4%.

Racial composition as of the 2020 census
Race	Number	Percent
White	1,478	91.1%
Black or African American	9	0.6%
American Indian and Alaska Native	4	0.2%
Asian	30	1.8%
Native Hawaiian and Other Pacific Islander	0	0.0%
Some other race	18	1.1%
Two or more races	84	5.2%
Hispanic or Latino (of any race)	75	4.6%

=== 2000 census ===
As of the 2000 census, there were 1,565 people, 749 households, and 409 families residing in the CDP. The population density was 886.7 inhabitants per square mile (342.4/km^{2}). There were 764 housing units at an average density of 432.9 per square mile (167.1/km^{2}). The racial makeup of the CDP was 96.93% White, 0.58% African American, 0.32% Asian, 1.09% from other races, and 1.09% from two or more races. Hispanic or Latino of any race were 1.15% of the population.

There were 749 households, out of which 25.0% had children under the age of 18 living with them, 43.4% were married couples living together, 9.3% had a female householder with no husband present, and 45.3% were non-families. 40.5% of all households were made up of individuals, and 18.8% had someone living alone who was 65 years of age or older. The average household size was 2.09 and the average family size was 2.84.

In the CDP, the population was spread out, with 22.2% under the age of 18, 3.9% from 18 to 24, 33.0% from 25 to 44, 24.3% from 45 to 64, and 16.5% who were 65 years of age or older. The median age was 40 years. For every 100 females, there were 88.1 males. For every 100 females age 18 and over, there were 82.2 males.

The median income for a household in the CDP was $46,543, and the median income for a family was $64,028. Males had a median income of $45,938 versus $32,298 for females. The per capita income for the CDP was $25,206. About 6.6% of families and 7.4% of the population were below the poverty line, including 7.8% of those under age 18 and 1.7% of those age 65 or over.
