= Collinsville Renewable Energy Promotion Act =

- Long title: To reinstate and transfer certain hydroelectric licenses and extend the deadline for commencement of construction of certain hydroelectric projects.
- Announced in: the 113th United States Congress
- Sponsored by: Rep. Elizabeth H. Esty (D, CT-5)
- Number of co-sponsors: 0

Codification
- Acts affected: Federal Power Act, National Environmental Policy Act of 1969,
- U.S.C. sections affected: 16 U.S.C. § 806, 16 U.S.C. § 801, 42 U.S.C. § 4321 et seq., 16 U.S.C. § 797
- Agencies affected: Federal Energy Regulatory Commission, Council on Environmental Quality,

Legislative history
- Introduced in the House as H.R. 316 by Rep. Elizabeth Esty (D-CT) on January 18, 2013; Committee consideration by United States House Committee on Energy and Commerce, United States House Energy Subcommittee on Energy and Power, United States Senate Committee on Energy and Natural Resources; Passed the House on February 12, 2013 (voice vote); Passed the Senate on May 22, 2014 (Unanimous consent) with amendment; House agreed to Senate amendment on June 23, 2014 (Roll Call Vote 340: 379-3); Signed into law by President Barack Obama on June 30, 2014

The Collinsville Renewable Energy Promotion Act (H.R. 316; Pub. L. 113–122 (text) (PDF)) is a U.S. public law that was introduced into the 113th United States Congress, which passed in the United States House of Representatives on February 12, 2013. The bill allows the town of Canton, Connecticut, to take over two lapsed licenses from the Federal Energy Regulatory Commission (FERC) in order to refurbish two old local dams. The dams would be used to produce hydroelectric power.

== Background ==
This summary is based largely on the summary provided by the House Report 113-7, a public domain source.

The Upper and Lower Collinsville Dams on the Farmington River were built to provide hydroelectric power to an ax factory, which was shut down in 1966. The dams have not produced power since that time, but continue to block upstream fish passage.

On February 23, 2001, FERC issued original licenses to Summit Hydropower to redevelop hydroelectric power capacity at these dams. The Upper Collinsville Dam project was to have a generation capacity of 373 kilowatts, while the Lower Dam was to have a capacity of 920 kilowatts. As part of this licensing process, an environmental assessment was completed. The licenses required Summit to commence project construction within two years from the issuance of the licenses.

Section 13 of the Federal Power Act requires licensees to commence construction of hydroelectric projects within the time fixed in the license, which shall be no more than two years from the issuance of the license, and authorizes the Commission to issue one extension of the deadline, for no more than two years.

On November 26, 2002, FERC granted Summit a two-year extension to commence project construction at both sites, moving the deadline to February 23, 2005. Because construction did not commence by that date, the Commission sent Summit a notice of probable termination of the licenses on November 2, 2007. Summit did not respond to the notice. FERC terminated the licenses on December 4, 2007. Summit did not seek rehearing of the termination order.

The town of Canton, Connecticut, intends to proceed with the two hydroelectric projects that Summit originally had proposed. On January 9, 2009, FERC granted the town a preliminary permit to undertake the necessary feasibility studies. The town has stated that it intends to pursue Low Impact Hydropower Institute certification for the projects and to provide for fish passage.

Identical legislation passed the House of Representatives in both the 111th and 112th Congresses as H.R. 4451 and H.R. 5625, respectively. H.R. 4451 was agreed to in the House by voice vote, under suspension of the rules, on June 16, 2010. H.R. 5625 passed the House by voice vote, under suspension of the rules, on June 26, 2012.

== Provisions/Elements of the bill ==
This summary is based largely on the summary provided by the Congressional Research Service, a public domain source.

The Collinsville Renewable Energy Promotion Act would authorize the Federal Energy Regulatory Commission (FERC) to:

(1) reinstate the license for either or each of the projects numbered 10822 and 10823, and
(2) extend for two years after the date on which either or each such project is reinstated the time period during which the licensee must commence project construction.

The Collinsville Renewable Energy Promotion Act also directs the FERC to:

(1) transfer the reinstated licenses to the town of Canton, Connecticut, if it reinstates them and extends the time period during which the licensee is required to commence project construction; and
(2) complete an environmental assessment for the projects and update the environmental analysis performed during the licensing process.

Finally, the Collinsville Renewable Energy Promotion Act sets a deadline for the FERC to:

(1) reach a final decision concerning the projects, and
(2) complete the license transfer if it decides to reinstate either or both licenses.

The Collinsville Renewable Energy Promotion Act provides a variety of exemptions from provisions of the Federal Power Act to the two projects listed in the bill.

== Procedural history ==
The bill was introduced to the House by Rep. Elizabeth Esty (D-CT) on January 18, 2013. It was referred to the United States House Committee on Energy and Commerce and the United States House Energy Subcommittee on Energy and Power. The bill had no co-sponsors and was not amended while in the House of Representatives. On February 12, 2013, the bill was passed under a motion to suspend the rules with a voice vote. This procedure typically indicates that a bill is broadly non-controversial. The bill was freshman Representative Esty's first bill in Congress.

The bill was received by the United States Senate on February 13, 2013 and then referred to the United States Senate Committee on Energy and Natural Resources. The Senate passed the bill by unanimous consent on May 22, 2014 after making an amendment in the nature of a substitute.

The House voted on June 23, 2014 to agree to the Senate's amendment of the bill. The vote was 379-3 in Roll Call Vote 340. President Barack Obama signed the bill into law on June 30, 2014.

== Public perception ==
The bill received very little attention from the national press. It was briefly covered in local media of Canton, Connecticut and the surrounding areas. One op-ed writer was strongly opposed to the bill, claiming that it was locally known as the "Collinsville White Elephant Act." The op-ed writer argued that rather than being a win-win situation, the new power plants would only serve to increase the electricity bills of local residents and provide additional revenue for the local government (potentially for them to misspend). He based this assessment on existing state electricity laws and problems associated with net metering.

== See also ==
- Federal Power Act
- Net metering
