= CT Transit Stamford =

Connecticut Transit bus service in Stamford area

CT Stamford

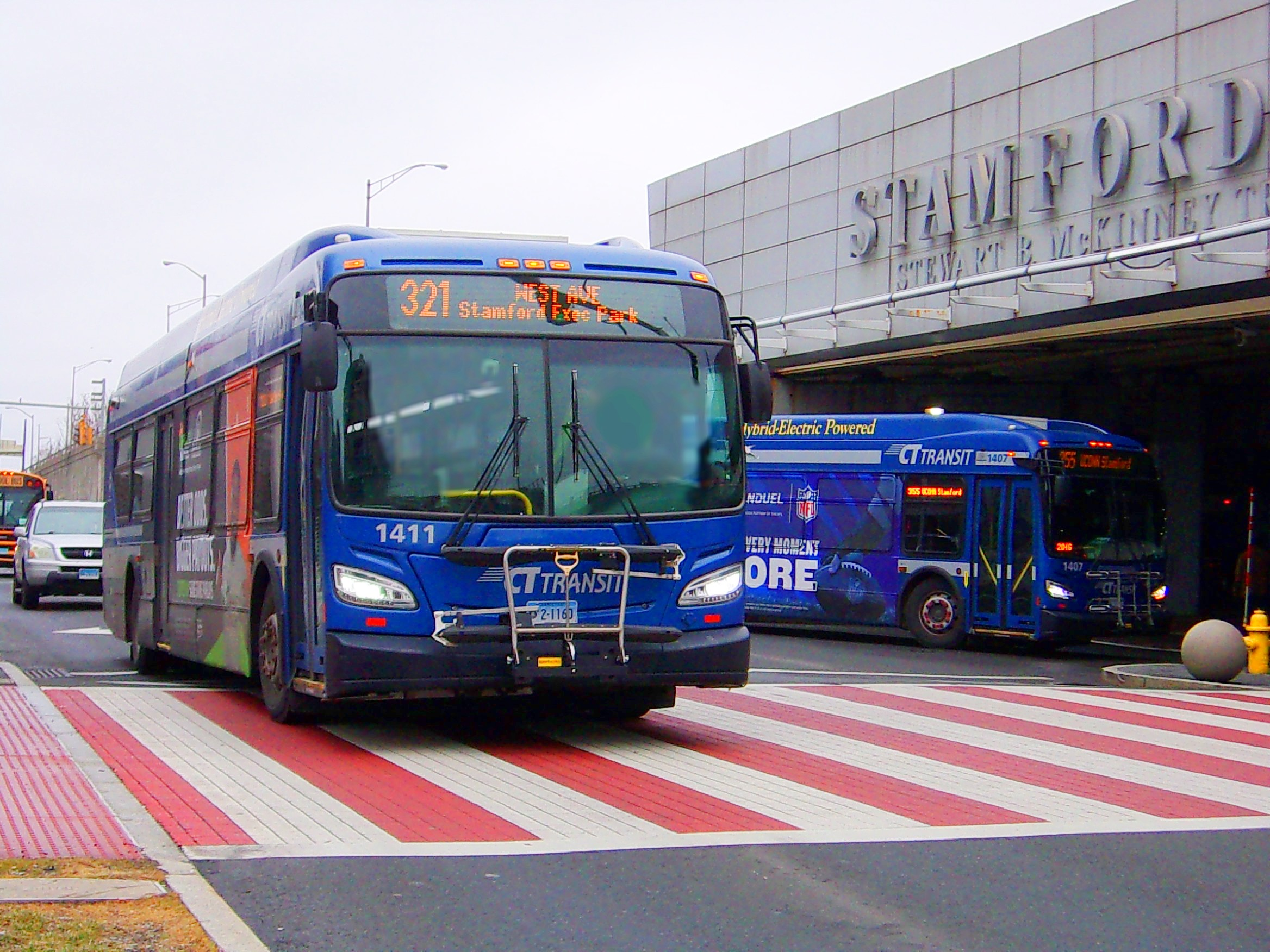
- Parent: Connecticut Department of Transportation
- Founded: 1976
- Headquarters: 26 Elm Court; Stamford, CT 06902
- Locale: Connecticut
- Service area: Southwestern Connecticut
- Service type: Local bus service
- Routes: 14 local 4 commuter shuttle 1 express
- Hubs: Stamford Transportation Center
- Fleet: 41 (Including new 2024 New Flyer XE40 24-series BEB)
- Daily ridership: 6,488 (weekday); 4,125 (Saturday); 2,280 (Sunday)
- Operator: RATP Group
- Chief executive: Andrew Miranda (Division Manager)
- Website: Official Website

CT Transit Stamford is the division of CT Transit for the Stamford, Connecticut metropolitan area. It provides service on 20 bus routes in Stamford and nearby towns and cities. All routes originate from the Stamford Transportation Center, in Downtown Stamford, and connect to other neighborhoods in Stamford, as well as Greenwich, Darien, Norwalk, as well as Port Chester and White Plains in New York state. CT Transit Stamford's service area overlaps that of the Norwalk Transit District (including the Greenwich Connector it operates in Greenwich), HARTransit's Route 7 Link in Norwalk, Greater Bridgeport Transit's Coastal Link, and the Bee Line Bus in Port Chester and White Plains.

As of 2023, CT Transit Stamford is operated by an American subsidiary of France's state-owned RATP Group.

== History ==
Starting in 1979, the Hartford, New Haven, and Stamford divisions of CT Transit were operated by First Transit.

Prior to 2002, CT Transit Stamford routes were identified by letters rather than numbers, just like the systems in Hartford and New Haven. Some bus stop signs outside of downtown Stamford and Greenwich still display the route letters. On Sunday, August 14, 2016, buses serving the Stamford area, with the exception of the I-Bus, were numbered 301 through 399.

On December 27, 2022, the Connecticut Department of Transportation announced it would switch its operator if its Hartford, New Haven, and Stamford divisions of CT Transit from First Transit to RATP Dev USA, a division of France's state-owned RATP Group. The contract became effective at the start of 2023, and lasts for four years, and includes a clause that the Connecticut Department of Transportation can extend the contract for two more years twice.

== Routes ==
These are the routes operated by CT Transit in the Stamford Division.

=== Local, Express, and Commuter Connections ===
Route	Route Name	Terminus	Notes
311	Port Chester	311: Port Chester Via West Putnam Avenue- Greenwich Station 311B: Port Chester Via Hamilton Avenue- Greenwich Railroad Station	Connects to Bee Line System Route 13 and 61 in Port Chester and NTD Wheels Central and West Loops in Greenwich.
312	West Main Street	312: Adams Corner	Route 312 is a shorter variation of Route 311.
313	West Broad Street	313: Stamford Hospital-Connecticut Avenue	
321	West Avenue	321: Baxter Avenue	Loops through Southwest Stamford.
324	Fairfield Avenue	324: Waterside; 324S: Waterside-Soundview Farms	
326	Pacific Street	326: South End 326C: Cummings Park 326S: Shippan Point	A split route of the Former Route 44. Serves the South End of Stamford.; Returns to the Transportation Center via Atlantic Street.
327	Shippan Ave via Transitway	327X: Shippan Point via Transitway	Formerly part of the old Route 44.
328	Cove Road	328: Cove Island Park; 328/344: Cove Island Park via Glenbrook Road	Routes 328/344 operate outbound to Cove Island Park, then return to the Stamford Transportation Center via Glenbrook Road.
331	High Ridge Road	331: Stamford Museum; 331B: Briar Brae Road; 331S: Smith House	
333	Newfield Avenue	333: Tully Health Center-Newfield Green; 333D: Tully Health Center-Davenport Ridge; 333/334: Tully Health Center-Springdale Station-Hope Street	The combined Routes 333/334 operates outbound via Newfield Avenue and Weed Hill Road to Springdale Station then returns to the Stamford Transportation Center via Hope Street.
334	Hope Street	334: Springdale Station; 333/334: Newfield Avenue-Tully Health Center-Springdale Station-Hope Street	The combined Routes 333/334 operates outbound via Newfield Avenue and Weed Hill Road to Springdale Station then returns to the Stamford Transportation Center via Hope Street.
335	Washington Boulevard	335: Bulls Head	Formerly part of the old 32–Long Ridge Road route.
336	Long Ridge Road	336: Rock Rimmon Road; 336R: Roxbury Road	
341	Norwalk	341: Norwalk via Darien Station; 341C: Norwalk via Darien Station & CT State Norwalk	Connects to most NTD Wheels Routes in Norwalk Wheels Hub, Route 1, and CT State Norwalk; Connects to Route 7 Link to Danbury.; Connects to Coastal Link to Bridgeport and Milford.
342	East Main Street	342: Blachley Road	Route 342 is a shorter variation of Route 341.
344	Glenbrook Road	344: Darien Station; 328/344: Cove Road–Cove Island Park–Glenbrook Road	Routes 328/344 operate outbound to Cove Island Park, then return to the Stamford Transportation Center via Glenbrook Road.
345	NCC Flyer	345X: CT State Norwalk via I-95	Route 345X is a supplement for Route 341C only. It runs Monday - Thursday when classes are in session.
349	Cove Island Park/Glenbrook/Springdale	349: Cove Island Park/Glenbrook/Springdale	A new route introduced in March 2023 that provides a cross-town connection between Stamford's East Side, Glenbrook and Springdale neighborhoods. This is currently the only route that does not run into Downtown Stamford or the Stamford Transportation Center.
351	Stamford Connector: Downtown Loop	351: Downtown Loop	
355	UConn Connector	355: UCONN Stamford	Free shuttle service for UCONN Students. Fare is same as other local services.; Operates only during school semesters.; Started service in Fall 2019.
971	I-Bus Express Stamford/White Plains	971: White Plains via I-95 & Greenwich; 971: White Plains via I-95	Connects to many Bee-Line, Hudson Link, and other routes at White Plains TransCenter. Connects to NTD Wheels Greenwich Central, West Loop, and Route 311 at Greenwich Station.

== See also ==
- Connecticut Transit Hartford
- Connecticut Transit New Britain and Bristol
- Connecticut Transit New Haven
- Northeast Transportation Company
