= Smartfood =

American popcorn brand

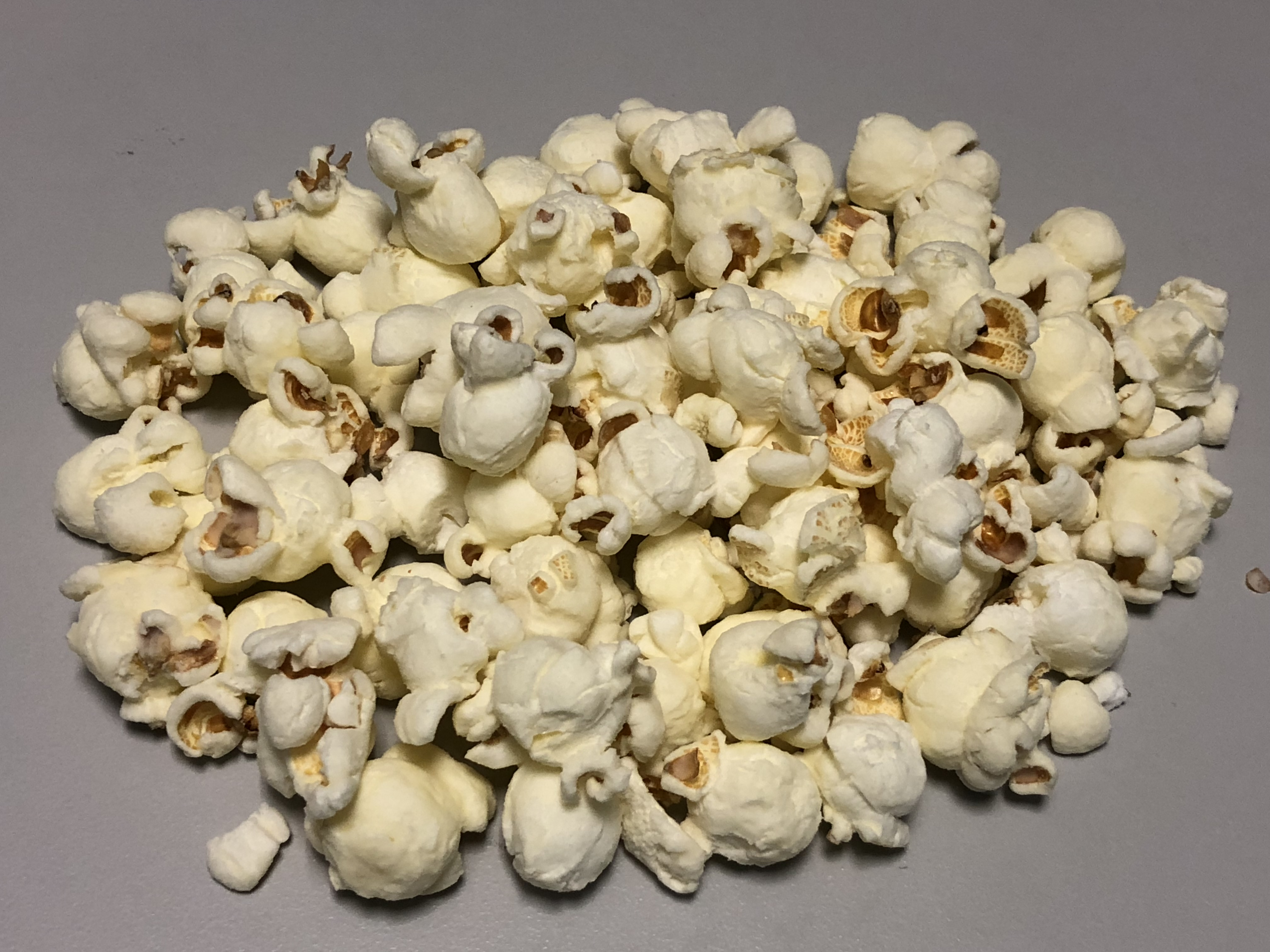
- Product type: Popcorn
- Current owner: Frito-Lay
- Country: United States
- Introduced: 1985; 41 years ago
- Website: smartfood.com

Smartfood is an American brand of pre-popped, flavored popcorn, founded in 1984 by Annie Withey, Andrew Martin, and Ken Meyers in Marlborough, Massachusetts. Frito-Lay purchased Smartfood in 1989 for $15 million.

== History ==
Smartfood was first created in 1985 by Andrew Martin - chairman and CEO, Ken Meyers- VP of operations, and Martin's wife Annie Withey- VP of consumer relations, in Hampton, Connecticut. Smartfood was first marketed under the registered brand name in 1985, and was manufactured in Marlborough, Massachusetts. Smartfood was brought to market with the help of the Yandow family.

According to Martin, “Unlike the cheese popcorn already on the market, ours was made with real cheese and it didn't glow in the dark. We wanted quality and we were up against the negative consumer image, because pre-popped popcorn in a bag was considered garbage, not worth the money because it is not fresh and you can make it better and cheaper at home."

In January 1989, the company was sold to Texas-based Frito-Lay for 15 million.

Withey and Martin later formed Annie's Homegrown, which markets macaroni and cheese, pasta, and other organic products.

In 2012, Frito-Lay expanded the Smartfood brand with additional flavors. The logo was updated in 2019. A writer for Eater observed that the recipe was changed in 2021.

In 2024, Smartfood was the highest-selling brand of ready-to-eat popcorn.

== See also ==
- List of popcorn brands
