= The Annex, New Haven =

Neighborhood in New Haven, Connecticut

Coordinates: 41.29°N 72.9°W

The Annex is a residential neighborhood in the city of New Haven, Connecticut. Originally part of East Haven, the neighborhood was voluntarily ceded by East Haven and annexed by the city of New Haven in the 1880s. It is located on the eastern side of New Haven Harbor across from Long Wharf. The City of New Haven defines the neighborhood to be the region bounded by Upson Terrace and East Shore Park on the south (border with Morris Cove), the city of East Haven on the east, Warwick Street and East Ferry Street on the northeast (border with Fair Haven Heights), the Quinnipiac River on the northwest, and New Haven Harbor on the west.

== Demographics ==
The neighborhood roughly corresponds to census tract 1427. As of the 2000 census, the total population of the neighborhood was 5,529. Of the population, 61.40% identified as White, 18.21% as Black, 0.34% as Native American, 2.66% as Asian, 14.29% as some other race, and 3.09% as two or more races. Of the total population of any race, 26.08% identified as being Hispanic or Latino, while 30.89% identified as being of Italian ancestry.
