= Annie's Homegrown =

Food company based in California

Annie's, Inc.
- Type: Subsidiary
- Industry: Organic products
- Founded: 1989; 37 years ago Hampton, Connecticut, U.S.
- Founder: Annie Withey; Andrew Martin
- Headquarters: Berkeley, California, U.S.
- Area served: United States; Canada
- Key people: Annie Withey
- Products: Macaroni and cheese, soup, pasta, salad dressing, crackers, fruit snacks, snack mix, frozen pizza bites, waffles, breakfast cereal, cheese puffs, snack bars, graham crackers, pancakes, ice pops, cookies, barbecue sauce, mustard, ketchup
- Owner: General Mills
- Website: www.annies.com

Annie's Homegrown (or simply Annie's) is an American organic food company owned by General Mills. The company was founded in Hampton, Connecticut, by Annie Withey and Andrew Martin, who had previously founded Smartfood popcorn along with Ken Meyers. It is best known for its macaroni and cheese product line, which comes in shell form and rabbit shapes and is the second-best selling macaroni and cheese in the United States behind Kraft. The company also produces Annie's Naturals, which includes condiments, dressings, and barbecue sauces.

== History ==
Annie Withey, creator of the Smartfood popcorn brand alongside her then-husband Andrew Martin, co-founded Annie's Homegrown with him in 1989. Initially, the company only sold "natural" macaroni and cheese in New England supermarkets. During the early years of the company, Withey's phone number was listed on every box of macaroni and cheese, and her product was advertised through guerrilla marketing and sold by individuals ordering it cases at a time. Annie's completed a direct public offering in 1995 that raised $1.3 million. The company's rabbit mascot, Bernie, was designed by Thomas J. Paul Inc. Bernie appeared in the seal of approval called the "Rabbit of Approval" and another slogan called "Bunny of Approval" in 2020.

In 1999, John Foraker and his company Homegrown Natural Foods, which made flavored olive oils and mustards, invested $2 million in Annie's. An agreement was reached that would buy out Withey and Martin's shares in the company and make Annie's a private company. Withey became Annie's "inspirational president", largely removing herself from the company, and the company began distributing its products to chains like Costco, Kroger, and Safeway.

Solera Capital became the majority investor in the company with $23 million in 2002. They also added Foraker's company Homegrown Naturals (including brands Consorzio and Fantastic Foods) to the business and moved Annie's headquarters from Boston to Napa, California, in 2004. One year later, the company bought out Annie's Naturals, a (sometimes) organic salad dressing and condiment company founded by Annie Christopher of North Calais, Vermont. Later in 2011, Annie's headquarters relocated from Napa to Berkeley, California, and the company filed with the SEC in December of that year to raise money in an initial public offering.

In January 2012, Annie's announced the introduction of a certified organic rising crust frozen pizza line exclusive to Whole Foods Market.

Annie's opened their first bakery manufacturing plant in April 2014, purchased from Safeway Inc. for $7.4 million and located in Joplin, Missouri. General Mills acquired Annie's in September that same year for $820 million, by which point Annie Withey had completely cut ties with the company. In August 2017, once the acquisition by General Mills was complete, President of Annie's Homegrown John Foraker announced his resignation on LinkedIn.

== Products ==
Annie's manufactures a wide range of products besides boxed macaroni and cheese. These include snack foods like fruit snacks, cookies, cheese crackers and canned pasta meals. Packaging for the company's boxed products, as reported in 2004, is made from recycled paperboard, printed with water-based inks, and finished with an aqueous coating to avoid a glossy look, which is intended to emphasize the company's natural food labeling.

== Litigation and criticism ==
In 2021, a class action lawsuit was brought against General Mills for claims on Annie's macaroni and cheese products that they were "made with goodness", alleging that the description omitted that several products included ortho phthalates, some of which are regulated by the United States, Canada, and the European Union due to their linkage to various health issues. General Mills issued a statement several months prior to the lawsuit that they were moving to eliminate phthalates from their products after they were discovered in a 2017 report by the Coalition for Safer Food Processing and Packaging. The suit was limited in 2025 to only pertain to the omission of facts, not that the products' contents were affirmatively misrepresented.

Annie's macaroni and cheese had its recipe changed in September 2024 to replace milk and butter with corn starch, which was met with negative reviews, though revenues did not decrease throughout the year.

== See also ==
- List of food companies
