= Canton Center Historic District =

United States historic place

- U.S. National Register of Historic Places
- U.S. Historic district
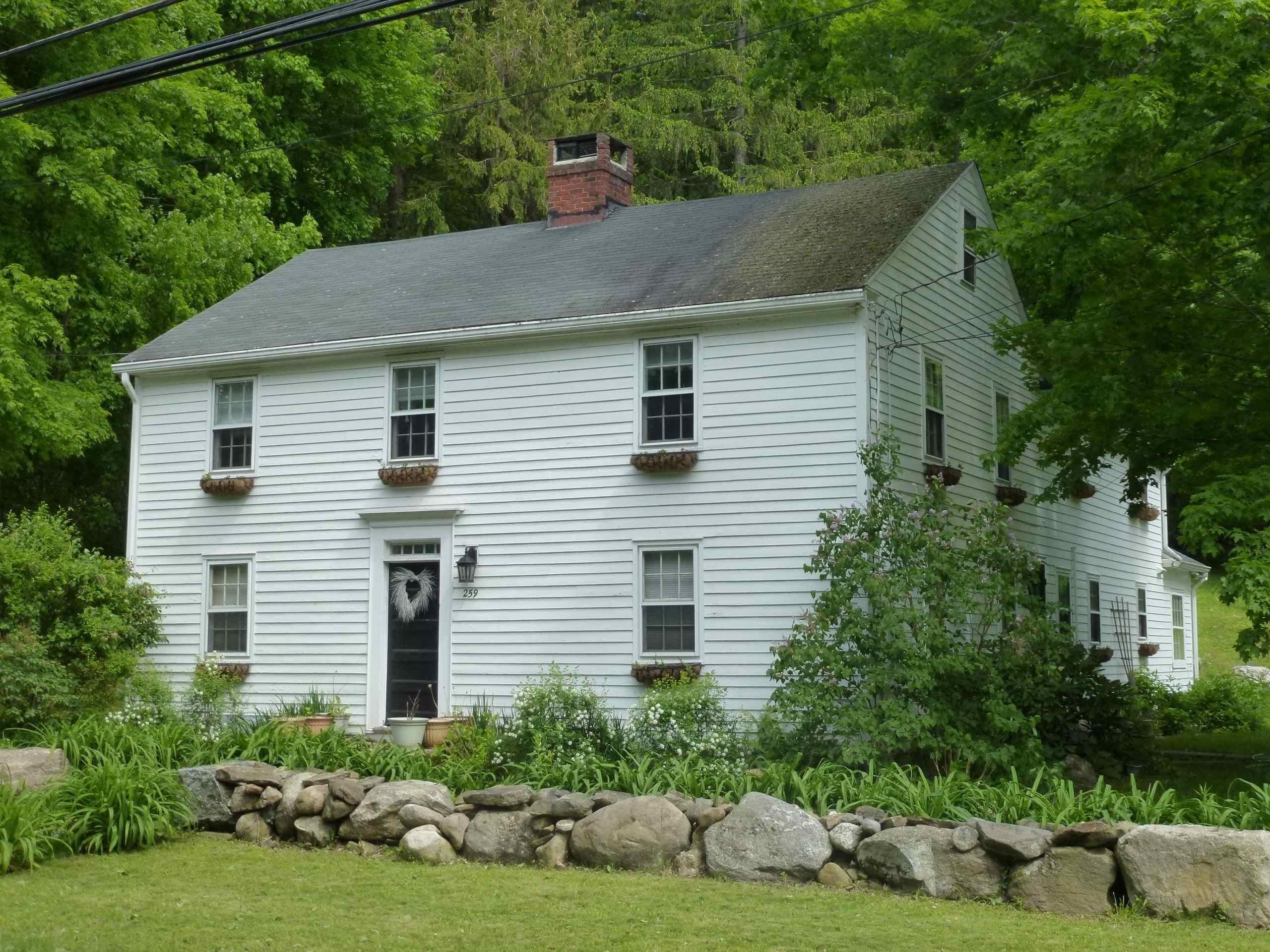
- Jesse Barber House (1789)

- Location within Connecticut Location within the United States
- Location: Roughly along Barbourtown, East Mountain, Humphrey, West, and West Mountain Roads, Canton, Connecticut
- Coordinates: 41°51′28″N 72°54′58″W
- Area: approximately 500 acres (200 ha)
- Architectural style: Late Victorian; Greek Revival
- NRHP reference No.: 97000831
- Added to NRHP: October 7, 1997

The Canton Center Historic District encompasses the historic rural town center of Canton, Connecticut, United States. Extending mainly along Connecticut Route 179, near the geographic town center, is a well-preserved example of a rural agricultural center in Connecticut, a role served until about 1920. The district includes many examples of Late Victorian and Greek Revival architecture. It was listed on the National Register of Historic Places in 1997.

== Description and history ==
The area that is now the town of Canton was settled in the 18th century as part of Simsbury. In 1750, it was given status as a separate parish, and it was incorporated in 1806. The town center organized itself along a stretch of the town's major north–south road, now Route 179, that roughly parallels Cherry Brook. It was here that the Congregation Church was located (current building dating to 1814), and a general store and other local services arose. Cherry Brook was used as a power source for modestly scaled local enterprises, including sawmills and tanneries. This rural center was eventually supplanted by Collinsville in the early 20th century as a more important commercial and civic hub, and development has consequently been limited since circa 1920.

The historic district covers about 500 acres (200 ha) of mainly rural landscape, and is roughly linear, extending along Route 179 between East Mountain and North Mountain Roads. A roughly triangular section bounded by West and Meadow Roads extends the district west of the main road. There are 84 contributing buildings, most of which are either primary buildings (houses, schools, etc.) or major secondary buildings such as barns. Most of the buildings are wood frame residences, in Federal or Greek Revival styles, although there are a few examples of later Victorian architecture. No buildings appear to date from the earliest time of the area's settlement. One of the oldest surviving houses in the district is the Caleb Case House, built in 1785. Non-residential buildings include the church, a general store and blacksmith's shop, and several district school buildings which have been altered for other uses. Major modern intrusions include a Jehovah's Witnesses hall and the 1941 Cherry Brook School.

== See also ==
- National Register of Historic Places listings in Hartford County, Connecticut
