= West Rock, New Haven =

Neighborhood in New Haven, Connecticut

Coordinates: 41.3384°N 72.9608°W

West Rock is a neighborhood of the city of New Haven, Connecticut.

The neighborhood is dominated by the southern end of West Rock Ridge State Park. It also contains the campus of Southern Connecticut State University and Common Ground High School. The north end of the official neighborhood contains the Brookside neighborhood.

The public housing in the neighborhood has been redeveloped in recent years, after dilapidation and neglect, under the Federal HOPE VI program. These include Brookside, Rockview and Ribicoff (now Twin Brook).

For many years, the community was separated from neighboring Hamden, Connecticut by a chain link fence on the Hamden side of the border. The fence was a source of much political and racial conflict between the two municipalities. The neighboring communities and road network are now reconnected.
