= Connecticut Post Mall =

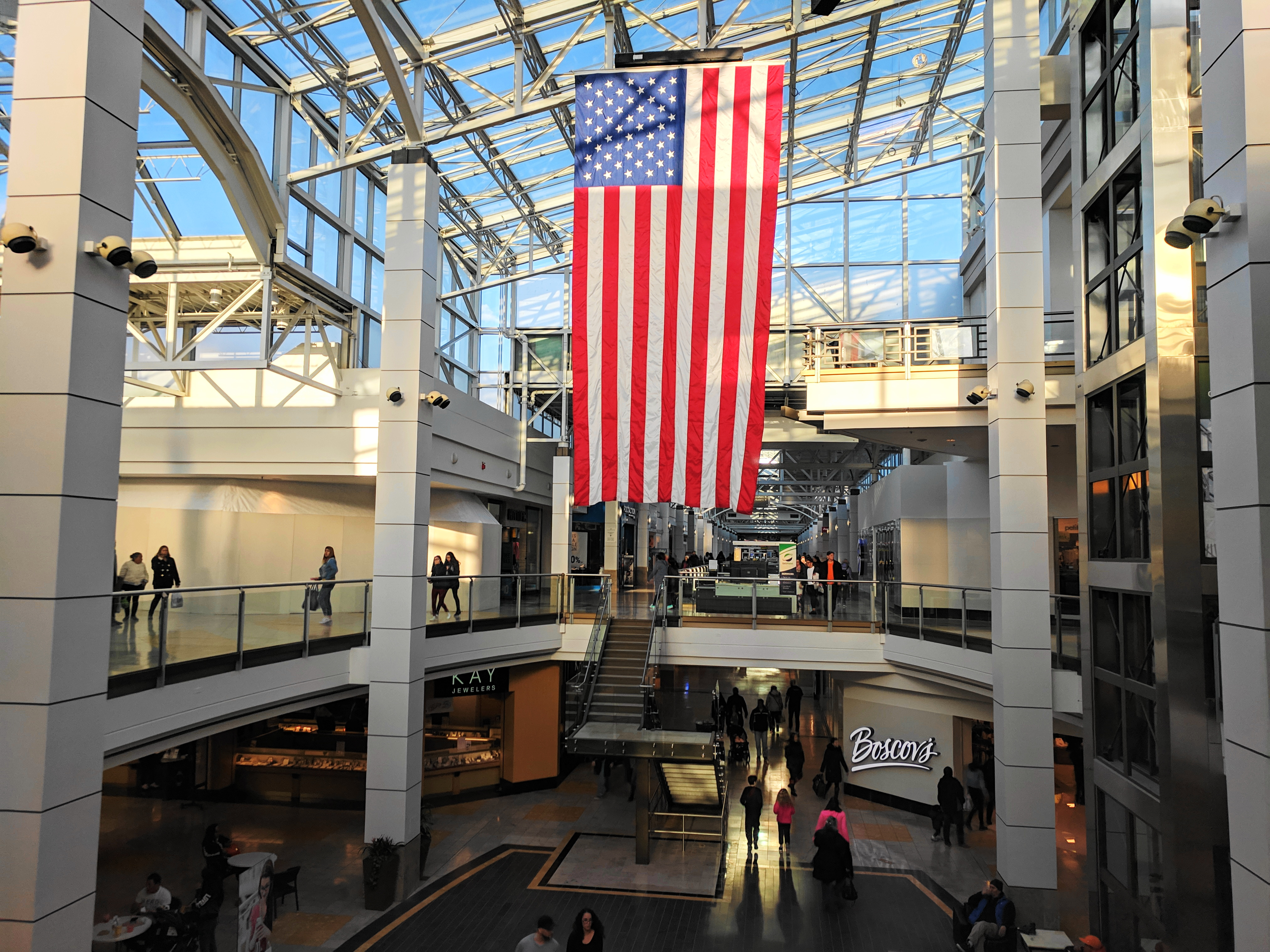
- Central Atrium of Connecticut Post Mall
- Location: Milford, Connecticut, United States of America
- Coordinates: 41°14′13″N 73°2′16″W
- Address: 1201 Boston Post Road, Milford, CT 06460
- Opened: 14 September 1960
- Renovated: 1980-81 1991-94 2004-06
- Developer: Sol G. Atlas
- Owner: Centennial Real Estate Co., Montgomery Street Partners (Blum Capital Partners), USAA Real Estate Co.
- Num. of stores: 115
- Num. of anchor tenants: 5
- Floor area: 1,300,000 sq ft
- Website: www.shopconnecticutpostmall.com

Connecticut Post Mall (formerly Westfield Connecticut Post) is a super-regional shopping center located at 1201 Boston Post Road in Milford, Connecticut. The center comprises 1.3 million square feet of leasable space and features 125 stores. It is the largest mall in the state of Connecticut.

== General History ==
Initial plans for the mall, originally named the Connecticut Post Shopping Center, were unveiled in 1957 by developer Sol G. Atlas. The plans proposed construction of an open-air center comprising 918,000 square feet of retail space featuring 80 stores, with surface parking for 5,600 cars. The site, totaling 75.4 acres, was previously owned by the Woodruff Seed Company.

The Atlas firm selected a Milford architect, Jesse James Hamblin, to design the center.

Development of the site started in late 1957, with construction on structures beginning in early 1958. The center was completed in 1960.

== Initial Reception ==
The center opened to the public on September 14, 1960. The opening ceremony drew 65,000 attendees, including U.S. Senator Prescott Bush (R-CT) and U.S. Representative Robert Giaimo (D-CT).

The center cost $30 million to construct (approximately $326 million in 2025 USD when adjusting for inflation) and at the time of opening was both the largest development project between Boston and New York and the largest shopping center in the state of Connecticut.

Many of the property’s original tenants opened flagship locations in the center, including:

Stop and Shop, Inc.:

- 33,000 square foot store
- Largest supermarket in the state of Connecticut

S.S. Kresge Co. (Kmart)

- Company's largest location in the state of Connecticut

Liggell-Rexall Drug Store

- 15,000 square foot store
- Company's largest location in the state of Connecticut

== Notable Changes by Decade ==
The Connecticut Post Mall has been the subject of several rehabilitative construction projects over the course of its life. Notable renovations of the property occurred in 1980-81; 1991-94; and 2004-06. A summary review of relevant events at the property by decade follows below:

=== 1960 - 1970 ===
The center gained its first anchor and major department store with the addition of a three-level, 155,000 square foot Alexander’s in August 1962.

In April 1965 the Milford Cinema, a single-screen movie theater owned by the General Cinema Corp., opened in a newly constructed stand-alone facility on the southwest corner of the mall’s property.

=== 1970 - 1980 ===
In 1972 the Milford Cinema added a second-screen.

In May 1976 a major fire broke out at the mall’s south end, resulting in the destruction of several stores. The damaged area was rebuilt as a two-level 86,000 square foot anchor store. The new space was ultimately occupied by Caldor and opened in April 1977.

The mall’s center court, adjacent to Alexander’s, was partially enclosed with an atrium in the late 1970s. The concourses of the mall extending north and south from the center remained open-air until 1981.

In December 1979 the mall was sold to a U.S. subsidiary of Australia-based Westfield, Ltd.

=== 1980 - 1990 ===
In 1980 Westfield began a two-year, multi million dollar renovation of the mall. As part of the renovation, the mall’s remaining concourses were enclosed with glass atriums and central HVAC was installed. The project was completed in 1981.

Upon completion of the renovation, the center was renamed the Connecticut Post Mall.

Notable tenant arrivals and departures during the 1980s included the addition of a B. Dalton bookstore in 1984, and the departure of the Alexander’s anchor in 1988.

The Milford Cinema expanded to a four-screen facility in 1982.

=== 1990 - 2000 ===
Between 1990 and 1994 the mall underwent another substantial renovation.

In 1991 a number of cosmetic upgrades were made, including the installation of marble floors throughout the main concourses; the construction of glass enclosed vestibules at concourse entrances; and the addition of a new, third-floor food court - the Skyview Cafe.

In 1994 the mall’s lower level, bisected by a 1,300 foot-long underground tunnel originally used for deliveries, was converted to additional retail space. Elevators, escalators, and staircases were installed alongside the now two-tier main concourse to connect the lower level with the upper level, creating the modern-day layout of the mall’s interior.

The cost of the renovations performed during this period totaled $100 million.

In 1998 the property was renamed the “Westfield Shoppingtown Connecticut Post”.

Notable tenant arrivals and departures during the 1990s included:

- The addition of a J.C.Penney department store in 1991 (in the anchor previously occupied by Alexander's)
- The addition of a newly built, 150,000 square foot G. Fox & Co. department store in 1991 (the mall's third anchor; G. Fox was replaced by Filene's in 1993)
- The departure of Caldor (1999); and,
- The departure of Stop and Shop (1999)

The Stop and Shop store was demolished following its closure and was replaced by a fourth anchor - a two-level 178,000 square foot Sears department store. The location opened in April 2000.

=== 2000 - 2010 ===
In 2003, Westfield officials proposed a large expansion of the mall. The plan proposed construction of a 480,000 square foot addition at the mall’s south end.

The City of Milford approved Westfield’s plans in April 2003. A groundbreaking ceremony for the $118 million-dollar project was held in October 2004 and site work began in December 2004.

Site work for the expansion entailed the closure and demolition of the Milford Fourplex Cinemas in January 2005.

With the expansion, a number of new amenities and stores joined the mall, including:

- A 125,000 square foot Target anchor store
- An 84,000 square foot Gaylan's (Dick's) sporting goods anchor store
- A 14-screen, 55,000 square foot National Amusements Cinema de Lux movie theater
- A new 12-stall food court
- Two new 500-vehicle parking garages
- A full-floor, 75,000 square foot addition to the Filene's anchor

The Skyview Cafe located on the third-floor of the mall’s center court was closed as part of the expansion.

Aside from its 2006 expansion, the mall experienced limited change through the remainder of the decade.

B. Dalton Books closed in April 2005 after 21 years at the center; Filene’s was replaced by Macy’s in September 2006; and the National Amusements Cinema de Lux movie theater was sold and rebranded as Rave Motion Pictures in June 2010.

=== 2010 - 2020 ===
The mall maintained its existing footprint during the 2010s, but began to experience challenges due to the rise of e-commerce.

In March 2011, Borders Books closed its location at the mall as a result of the company’s corporate bankruptcy proceedings. LA Fitness joined the center in 2012, and Rave Motion Pictures was rebranded as Cinemark in June 2013.

In December 2015, Westfield management announced its sale of the property after 36 years of ownership. The sale was part of a $1.1 billion deal involving four other Westfield-owned retail centers.

The mall was sold to a group of companies, including Centennial Real Estate Co., Montgomery Street Partners (Blum Capital Partners), and USAA Real Estate Co.

Centennial Real Estate was retained to manage the property, and the center was renamed the Connecticut Post Mall following the sale.

In July 2017, J.C.Penney closed its location at the mall after 26 years in business. J.C.Penney filed for bankruptcy in May 2020.

In the Spring of 2018, Dave & Busters opened a 35,000 square foot location in the mall. In October 2018, Boscov’s department store opened in the anchor formerly occupied by J.C.Penney.

In December 2018, Sears closed its location at the mall after 18 years in business. Sears had filed for bankruptcy two months prior in October 2018.

On December 26, 2018 and December 26, 2019, multiple fights involving groups of unattended minors occurred inside the mall. The incidents attracted a heightened police presence and local media attention. The property was closed early in response to both incidents, and a new attendance policy for minors was implemented as a result.

== Redevelopment Plans: 2020 - Present ==
At the start of the 2020s, the mall was struggling to drive foot traffic. In 2020, Centennial Real Estate officials disclosed that the mall had experienced a 20% drop in visitors over the preceding five years. Officials also disclosed that between 2017 and 2020, 25 tenants had vacated the property.

The COVID-19 pandemic exacerbated the property’s challenges, as Connecticut Governor Ned Lamont (D) mandated the closure of non-essential businesses, including malls, between March and May of 2020 to slow transmission of the virus in the state.

=== 2020 Redevelopment Proposal ===
In an effort to revitalize the center and respond to the changing tastes of consumers, Centennial officials announced plans to build a luxury residential development on a vacant portion of the mall’s property. Then Milford mayor Ben Blake vocally opposed Centennial’s plan.

In September 2020, Centennial applied for a change to the city’s zoning regulations to allow the construction of residential buildings on mall property. In presenting their application to the city, Centennial officials stated that the mall was in “urgent need of investment and redevelopment”.

Centennial’s application was denied by the Milford Planning and Zoning Board in October 2020 by a 5-3 vote. In qualifying the denial, city officials expressed an unwillingness to permit housing at the mall, and instead voiced their preference for the development of general or medical offices, and incubator or co-working spaces at the site.

=== 2021 Redevelopment Proposal ===
In May 2021, Centennial officials announced a new, more comprehensive, two-phase redevelopment plan for the property, taking into consideration the preferences of the city’s planners.

Phase 1 of the revised proposal included the construction of 300-units of housing in two buildings surrounding a newly built and publicly accessible plaza.

Phase 2 of the project entailed an extensive redevelopment of the existing mall building, and consisted of:

- Demolition and reconstruction of the existing section of the mall between the former Sears anchor and Macy's
- Construction of 200 units of housing
- New leasable commercial space for office, medical, and lab science tenants
- New public outdoor plazas and open spaces
- A redesign of the mall's US-1 facing facade and parking surfaces

Centennial submitted a revised application for a change to the city’s zoning regulations to allow the construction. Centennial’s revised application was denied by the Milford Planning and Zoning Board in October 2021 by a 7-3 vote.

In qualifying their second consecutive denial, Board members cited concerns about Centennial’s proposed mixed use improvements leading to increased competition for retailers and housing demand in downtown Milford.

Centennial filed a lawsuit against the City of Milford in January 2022 to appeal its repeated denials.

=== 2023 Redevelopment Proposal ===
In October 2023, Centennial officials submitted a third application for a change to the city's zoning regulations to allow for the addition of up to 750 units of housing at the mall. Housing would be added to the site in phases, with each of three phases entailing the addition of 250 housing units over a period of ten years.

Centennial's request for an amendment to the city's zoning regulations was approved unanimously by the city's Planning and Zoning Board on October 3, 2023.

Formal design plans for the property's redevelopment are still in the planning stages as of March 2025 according to Centennial representatives.
