= Waterbury and Milldale Tramway =

Former streetcar line in Connecticut, US

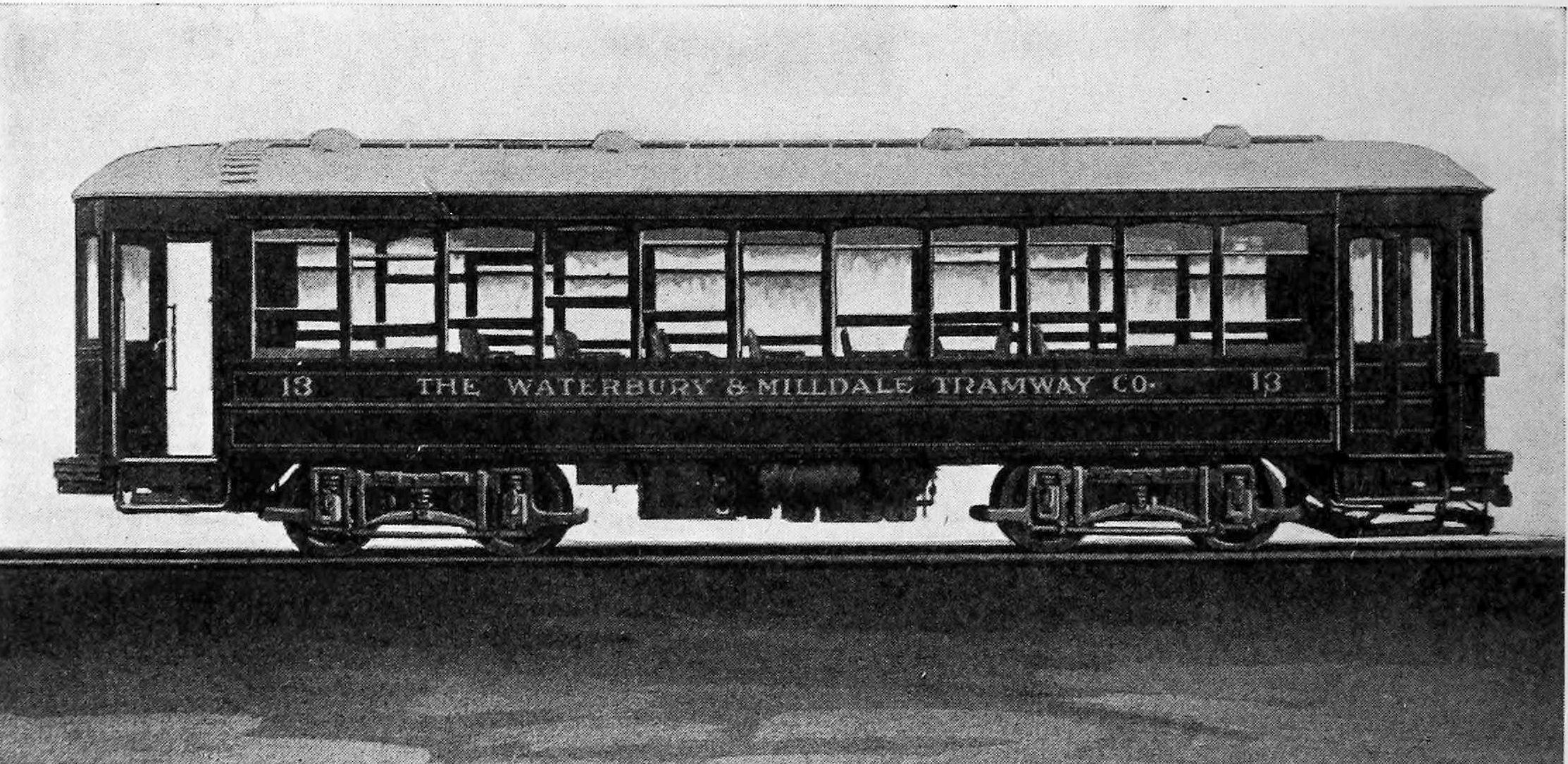
- Waterbury and Milldale Tramway streetcar in 1916

Overview
- Fleet: 8
- Headquarters: 144 Bank Street, Waterbury, Connecticut
- Locale: Waterbury, Wolcott, and Southington, Connecticut
- Dates of operation: November 19, 1913–October 29, 1933

Technical
- Track gauge: 1,435 mm (4 ft 8 1/2 in)
- Length: 8.702 miles (14.00 km)
- No. of tracks: 1
- Operating speed: 15 miles per hour (24 km/h) average

The Waterbury and Milldale Tramway was a streetcar line that operated between Waterbury and Milldale, Connecticut, United States. The line was 8.702 miles (14.00 km) long, including 1.385 miles (2.23 km) of trackage rights on a Connecticut Company line to reach downtown Waterbury. The company was chartered in June 1907 and began construction in mid-1912. It opened in stages, with the first section entering service on November 19, 1913, and the full line open on December 19, 1914. The line was soon unprofitable; the east portion was abandoned in October 1927, and the remainder in October 1933. A bus route that replaced the western portion continues to run as CTtransit route 425, operated by the Northeast Transportation Company. The Waterbury and Milldale was locally known as the "Green Line" after its green-painted streetcars, which included a pair of unique cars.

== Route ==
Route of the Waterbury and Milldale Tramway

The company's single line was 8.702 miles (14.00 km) long. Its west end was at Exchange Place in downtown Waterbury, the main transfer point of the Waterbury Traction Company (later the Waterbury Division of the Connecticut Company). The first 1.385 miles (2.23 km) ran east on East Main Street using trackage rights on the Waterbury Traction Company's Cheshire line. It turned onto the company's own trackage on Meriden Road. A carhouse was located off Meriden Road in the East End neighborhood of Waterbury.

The line left Meriden Road near Hitchcock Lake in southern Wolcott and crossed the Meriden–Waterbury Turnpike on a bridge at the top of Southington Mountain. It followed a private right-of-way down the side of the mountain, then joined the turnpike in the Marion neighborhood of Southington. The line followed the turnpike under the Canal Line to Milldale, where it connected with Connecticut Company lines to New Britain and Meriden.

The entire Waterbury and Milldale line was single track, while the Connecticut Company line on East Main Street was double tracked. Four passing sidings totaling 0.245 miles (0.394 km) were located along the line. Of the 7.317 miles (11.78 km) of mainline belonging to the Waterbury and Milldale, about 6 miles (10 km) were on private right-of-way (including sections alongside a road), while the remaining portion was on roads. Average operating speed was 15 miles per hour (24 km/h).

== History ==
=== Construction ===
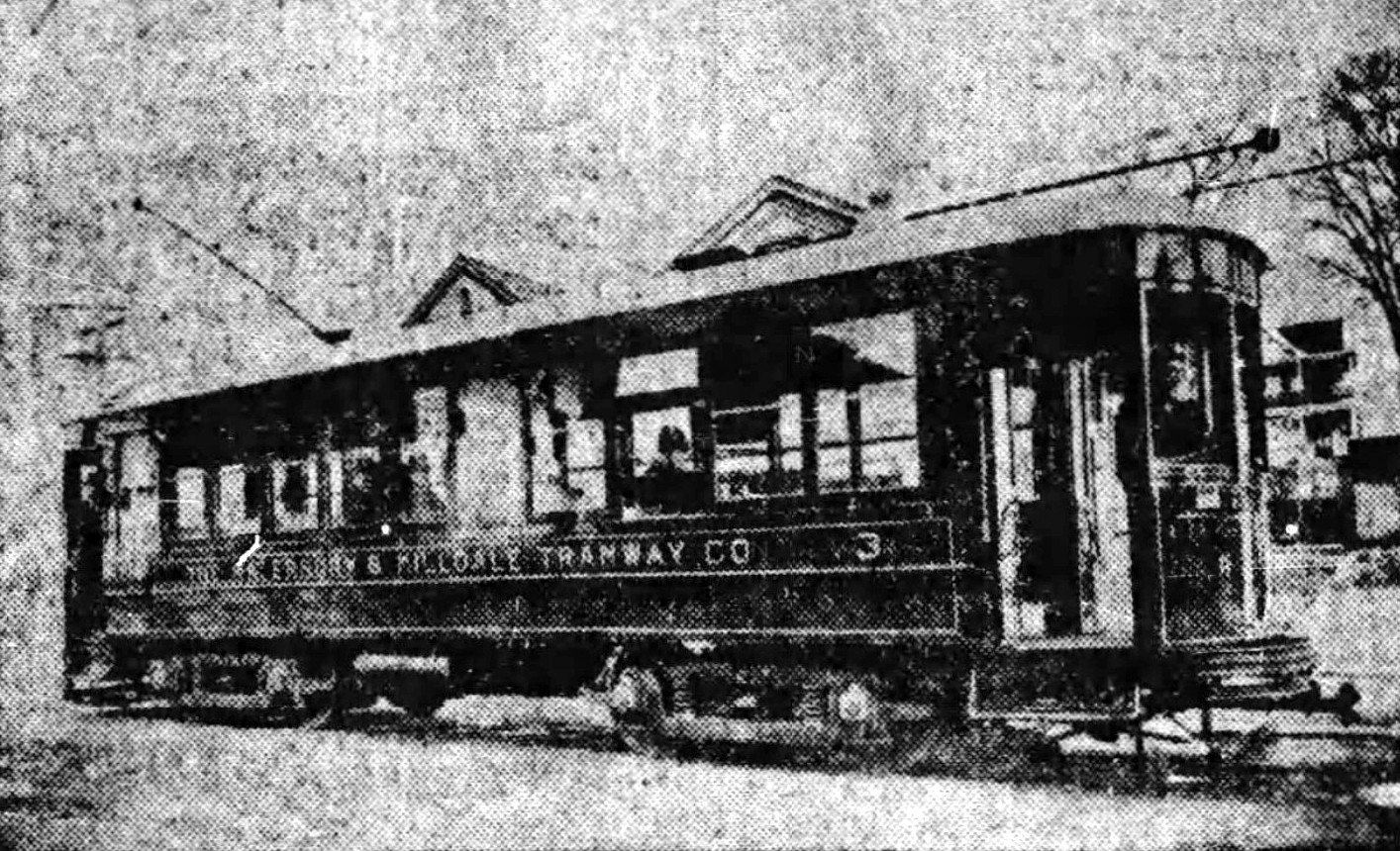
The first trip to Milldale on December 29, 1914

A streetcar line between Waterbury and Milldale was first proposed in 1899. The first attempt to incorporate the Waterbury and Milldale Tramway was rejected by the state legislature in July 1905. A second attempt to charter the company was approved by the legislature on June 5, 1907, over the veto of governor Rollin S. Woodruff. An extension to the charter was granted in August 1911. Construction ultimately began in October 1912. To satisfy the terms of the charter extension, one-quarter of the line was completed that December. A contract to complete the line as far east at Hitchcock Lake was awarded in July 1913.

The first 0.7 miles (1.1 km) from East Main Street to the Mill Plain School (at Woodtick Street) opened on November 19, 1913. This segment was operated with a single streetcar, which was stored in a Connecticut Company barn because the line had not yet reached the Waterbury and Milldale barn. Service was extended to Hitchcock Lake in late 1913 or early 1914. Morris Park, an existing summer resort on Hitchcock Lake, quickly expanded due to traffic brought by the streetcar line.

Construction of the extension over Southington Mountain to Milldale began in the spring of 1914. It required heavier construction than the previous sections, including blasting to remove boulders from the alignment. The Waterbury and Milldale paid three-eighths of the cost of the Canal Line underpass in Milldale; the town paid one quarter and the New York, New Haven and Hartford Railroad three eighths. Service over the full line to Milldale began on December 19, 1914. Service ran every half-hour, with a Waterbury–Milldale trip costing fifteen cents. Connections with Meriden–Southington cars were made at Milldale. For passengers travelling between Waterbury and Meriden, this represented a savings of fifteen minutes, five cents, and one transfer over the previous routing via Cheshire.

In 1915, the Connecticut Company petitioned the state to allow the Waterbury and Milldale to lay a second track – parallel to the existing Connecticut Company track – about 1,500 feet (460 m) east from Milldale to Dickerman's Corner to provide a better connection with the Connecticut Company line to Cheshire. The state denied the request in July 1915. In December 1916, the company created a subsidiary, the Waterbury and Bristol Tramway, to build a connecting line from Mill Plain to Bristol. The line was not built, but bus operating rights were retained. As did many streetcar companies, the Waterbury and Milldale sold residential electric power; by 1924, it supplied much of Wolcott. Connecticut Light and Power purchased the Wolcott power distribution rights and equipment in 1927.

=== Decline ===
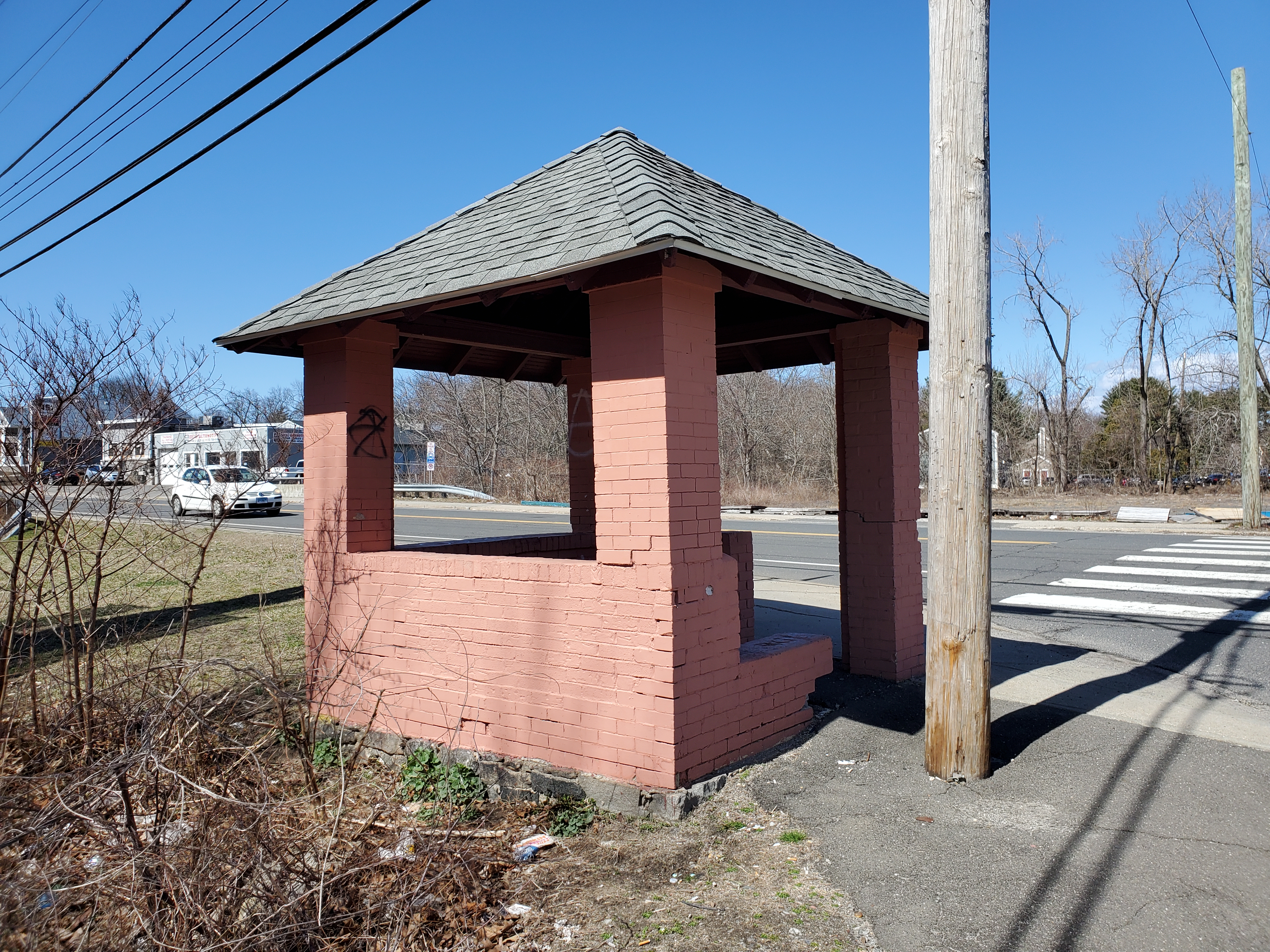
The remaining shelter seen in 2023

Competition from streetcars and automobiles decimated rural streetcar systems in the 1920s. Paving of the Waterbury–Cheshire Road began in 1925, creating an fully paved road between Waterbury and Meriden that avoided the steep grade of Southington Mountain, and the Waterbury–Milldale Turnpike was rebuilt on a straighter alignment later that decade. From 1925 to 1927, the Waterbury and Milldale and the New England Transportation Company (the bus subsidiary of the New York, New Haven and Hartford Railroad) engaged in litigation over which company would have the right to run Waterbury–Hartford bus service. In September 1927, the Waterbury and Milldale agreed to sell its bus franchise and buses to the competing company. It began operating a Waterbury–Hartford bus service on October 16, 1927, at which the Waterbury and Milldale ended streetcar service east of Hitchcock Lake.

In October 1933, the Waterbury and Milldale agreed to sell the operating rights to its route to Cooke Street Line, a local bus company. The final day of streetcar operation was October 29, 1933. Cooke Street Line began operating hourly Exchange Place–Hitchcock Lake buses plus half-hourly Exchange Place–Frost Road buses on October 30. The Waterbury and Milldale retained ownership of its private right-of-way, of which the portion along Meriden Road was purchased by the state for road widening. On April 3, 1936, the stockholders voted to dissolve the company. The right-of-way on Southington Mountain was sold at auction that December.

Cooke Street Line added a Waterbury–Dickerman's Corner route in June 1938, restoring service to the full length of the former streetcar line. Service was again cut back to just the Waterbury–Hitchcock Lake route in January 1969. The Connecticut Railway and Lighting Company (CR&L) took over the Cooke Street Line operations on October 1, 1969. The Northeast Transportation Company in turn took over CR&L operations in Waterbury, including the Hitchcock Lake line, in late 1972. Long numbered as route 25, it became route 425 in June 2017 as part of a statewide renumbering of CT Transit routes. A small brick waiting shelter from the Waterbury and Milldale Tramway is still extant at Woodland Road in Waterbury.

== Rolling stock ==
The Waterbury and Milldale Tramway owned eight streetcars over its operating span. Initial service was operated with four cars built by the Wason Manufacturing Company. Two additional "semi-convertible" cars (which had windows that could be fully raised on hot days) were acquired from Wason in 1916. The Waterbury and Milldale purchased additional cars numbered 112 and 114 from the American Car Company in 1921. The only double-truck center-entrance Birney cars ever produced, they were originally ordered in 1918 then cancelled by the Cape Breton Electric Company of Nova Scotia. The company was popularly known as the "Green Line" after the green-painted streetcars.
