= Waterbury Traction Company =

Streetcar operator in Connecticut, U.S.

The Waterbury Traction Company was a streetcar transit operator serving the region around Waterbury, Connecticut. Originally formed in 1884 as the Waterbury Horse Railroad Company, which began service in 1886. The company was reorganized in 1893 as the Waterbury Traction Company, rebuilding and electrifying its routes by the summer of 1894.

Connecticut Lighting and Power Company bought out Waterbury Traction Company in June 1899. The name of the new consolidated company was changed to Connecticut Railway and Lighting Company in 1901. In 1906, the streetcar lines were leased to the Consolidated Railway, which later became the Connecticut Company, a subsidiary of the New York, New Haven and Hartford Railroad.

== Connecticut Company (1906-1936) ==
By 1908, it was possible to travel by trolley from Waterbury to Thomaston, Naugatuck. Derby, and New Haven. Increased competition from improved roads and more affordable automobiles began to take its toll on the trolley lines. The interurban route to Thomaston was abandoned in 1929, and was not converted to bus operation. Independent operation resumed in 1936 when Connecticut Company was no longer able to maintain lease payments due to parent New Haven entering receivership.

== From trolley to bus (1936-1973) ==
Connecticut Railway and Lighting company resumed operation of the former Waterbury Traction lines in 1936. All local streetcar operations in Waterbury ended on May 22, 1937, and the route to New Haven closed a month later.

Connecticut Railway and Lighting Company bus operation continued over many of the same routes for years. All operations came to an end in 1973, and the transit franchises were surrendered to the North East Transportation Company, operating buses on a contract basis for CT Transit.
