= Bridgeport Traction Company =

American streetcar company in Connecticut

Overview
- Headquarters: Bridgeport, Connecticut
- Locale: Bridgeport, Connecticut
- Dates of operation: 1893–1972
- Predecessor: Bridgeport Horse Railway Company; Bridgeport Railway Company; East End Railway Company
- Successor: Connecticut Railway and Lighting Company

Technical
- Track gauge: 4 ft 8 1/2 in (1,435 mm)
- Electrification: 600v DC

The Bridgeport Traction Company was a streetcar transit company in the area around Bridgeport, Connecticut. The company was incorporated in 1893 through the consolidation of the Bridgeport Horse Railroad Company, Bridgeport Railway Company, and the East End Railway Company. The East End Railway Company was established in 1895 as the Bridgeport and West Stratford Horse Railroad Company. The Bridgeport Horse Railroad Company was incorporated in 1864. The Bridgeport Railway Company was formed in 1893. At the time, streetcars were a more affordable form of transportation for those commuting between Bridgeport and Norwalk. Using streetcars to get to their destination was half the price of using the train. In 1899 president Andrew Radel formed a company that was intended to control the world's oyster trade.

In 1901, Bridgeport Traction Company was sold to the Connecticut Railway and Lighting Company. From 1906 to 1936, its routes were controlled by the Connecticut Company, a subsidiary of the New York, New Haven and Hartford Railroad which controlled many of the streetcar operators across the state. The leases on the former Connecticut Railway and Lighting Co. routes were voided in 1936 for nonpayment while the New Haven was in receivership. CR&L resumed operation under its own name, and streetcar lines in Bridgeport, Derby, and Waterbury were replaced with buses in 1937. Bus transit operations continued until 1972. The transit franchises were succeeded by the Greater Bridgeport Transportation Authority soon after.
