= Connecticut Railway and Lighting Company Car Barn =

- U.S. National Register of Historic Places
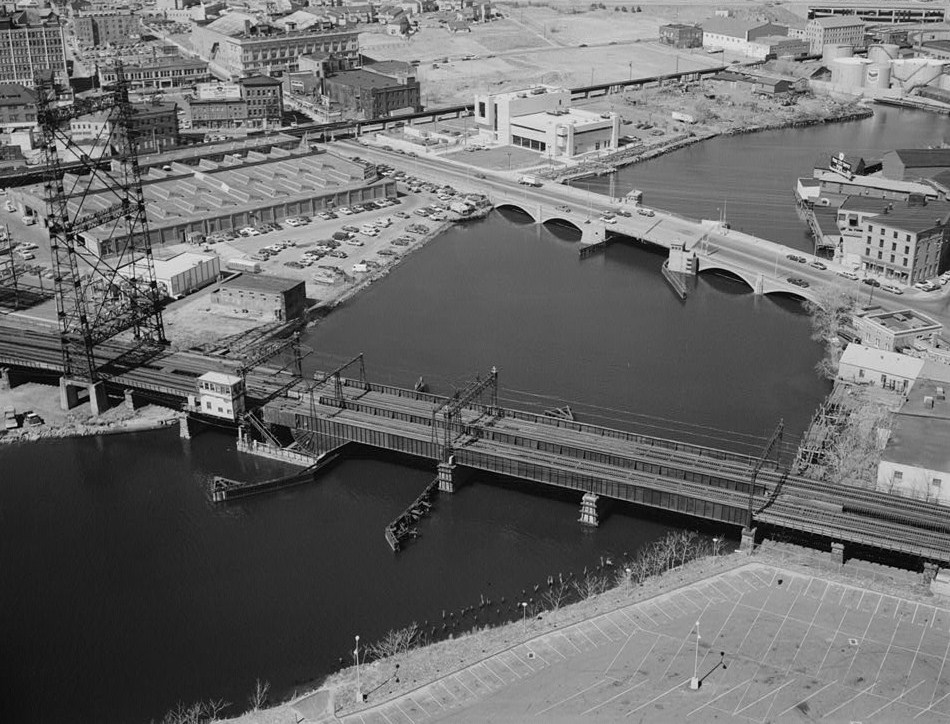
- Car barn (demolished) was the large building on the distant shore between the rail bridge (replaced) and the Congress Street road bridge (dismantled)

- Location within Connecticut Location within the United States
- Location: 55 Congress Street, Bridgeport, Connecticut
- Coordinates: 41°10′56″N 73°11′17″W
- Area: 5.7 acres (2.3 ha)
- Built: 1910
- Architect: Connecticut Railway & Lighting Co.
- Demolished: 2008
- MPS: Downtown Bridgeport MRA
- NRHP reference No.: 87001405
- Added to NRHP: December 3, 1987

The Connecticut Railway and Lighting Company Car Barn was historic streetcar maintenance facility in Bridgeport, Connecticut. Built in 1910 and enlarged in 1920, it served as a maintenance barn first for electric streetcars and then buses for many years, and was one of the few surviving reminders of the city's early public transit system. The building was listed on the National Register of Historic Places on December 3, 1987. It was demolished in 2008 to make way for construction of the Connecticut Superior Court juvenile facility that now stands on its site.

== Description and history ==
The Connecticut Railway and Lighting Company Car Barn was located on the east side of downtown Bridgeport, on a parcel of more than 5 acres (2.0 ha) bounded on the north by Congress Street, the west by Housatonic Street, the east by the Pequonnock River, and the south by a railroad right-of-way. The building had three parts: the western two-story office wing, the main garage in the eastern wing, and an extension of the garage to the south. It was built with load-bearing brick walls, and was a typical example of early 20th-century industrial design. The garage portion of the structure was covered by a series of parallel shed-roof monitor sections.

The barn was built in 1910, and served as the principal repair and storage facility for the Connecticut Railway and Lighting Company which provided Bridgeport's streetcar service in the early 20th century. It was adapted for bus repairs following the conversion of streetcar to bus service after World War II, and later served as a maintenance yard for the city's public works department.

== See also ==
- Bridgeport Traction Company
- Pequonnock River Railroad Bridge
- History of Bridgeport, Connecticut
- National Register of Historic Places listings in Bridgeport, Connecticut
