= CT Transit =

Brand of commuter bus operations in Connecticut, USA

CTtransit

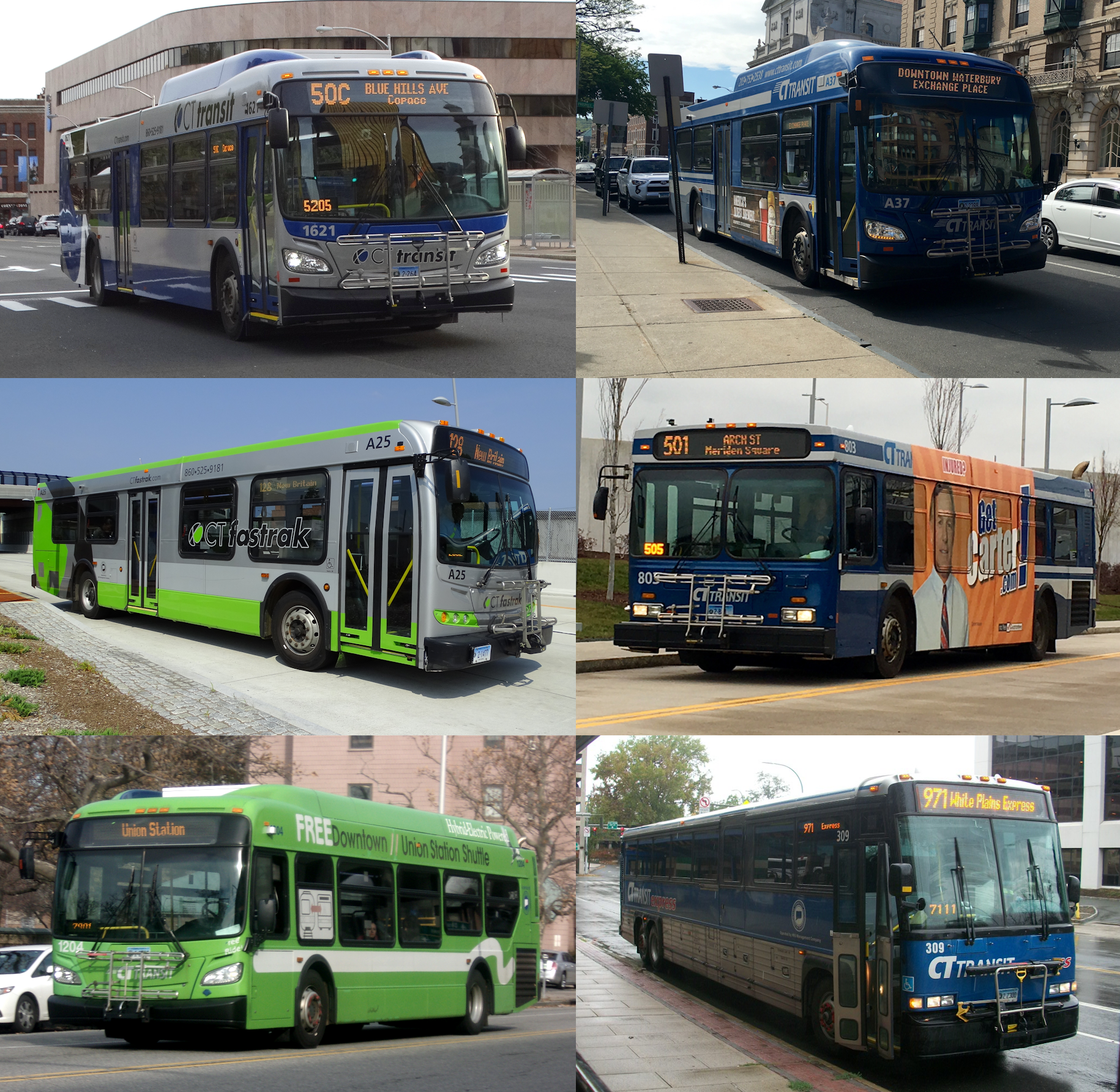
- A collage of different CT Transit services. Clockwise from top-left: a Hartford local bus; a Waterbury local bus; New Britain to Meriden; the White Plains express; the Union Station shuttle; CT Fastrak to New Britain.
- Parent: Connecticut Department of Transportation
- Founded: 1976
- Headquarters: Hartford, Connecticut
- Locale: Connecticut
- Service area: Metropolitan areas of Stamford, Hartford, New Haven, Waterbury, Meriden, New Britain, Bristol, and Wallingford
- Service type: Intrastate bus service
- Routes: 177 unique scheduled routes and shuttles as of 2023
- Operator: Various
- Chief executive: Thomas E. Stringer, Jr., HNS
- Website: www.cttransit.com

CT Transit (styled as CTtransit) is a public transportation bus system serving many metropolitan areas and their surrounding suburbs in the state of Connecticut. CT Transit is a division of the Connecticut Department of Transportation, although it contracts a number of private companies for most of its operations. CT Transit began operations in 1976 as Connecticut Transit after the Connecticut DOT's acquisition of the Connecticut Company. Initially serving only the Hartford, New Haven, and Stamford areas, CT Transit's service now extends throughout much of Connecticut. CT Transit provides local "city bus" service in Bristol, Hartford, Meriden, New Britain, New Haven, Stamford, Wallingford and Waterbury in addition to a number of express routes connecting to outlying suburbs and other regions of the state.

In 2015, CT Transit began operation of CT Fastrak, the first bus rapid transit system in Connecticut and second in New England.

== History ==
=== Background (1901–1950s) ===
Although private transportation has existed in Connecticut since its initial settlement, public transportation in Connecticut dates back to the 19th Century with the introduction of horse-drawn trolley lines in many towns across the state. In 1901 the Connecticut Railway and Lighting Company (CR&L) was formed to operate and extend electric powered trolley services. These operations were leased to the Consolidated Railway Company in 1906 and, a year later, merged with the New York, New Haven and Hartford Railroad.

In 1910, the New Haven Railroad formally sublet all of its street railway operations, including CR&L, to the Connecticut Company. By 1924, the Connecticut Company operated some 1,640-passenger cars over a network of 834 miles of track.

Although street railway services remained through much of Connecticut, as early as the 1920s underperforming street- and heavy-rail lines began to be replaced by motor coach services. The first replacement of street railways with buses in Connecticut occurred in Stamford in 1921, with the rate of replacement accelerating during the 1930s and 1940s.

In 1936, following financial setbacks during the Great Depression and being unable to maintain lease payments, the Connecticut Company was forced to divest the CR&L, representing nearly 35% of line mileage it operated prior to the divestment (152 miles of a total 438). The newly independent CR&L no longer operated any rail services, while its former lessee began eliminating street railway lines as a cost-cutting measure. Although World War II put a pause on significant service changes, it was not long after the last trolley lines were taken out of service.

=== Immediate predecessors (1950s–1976) ===
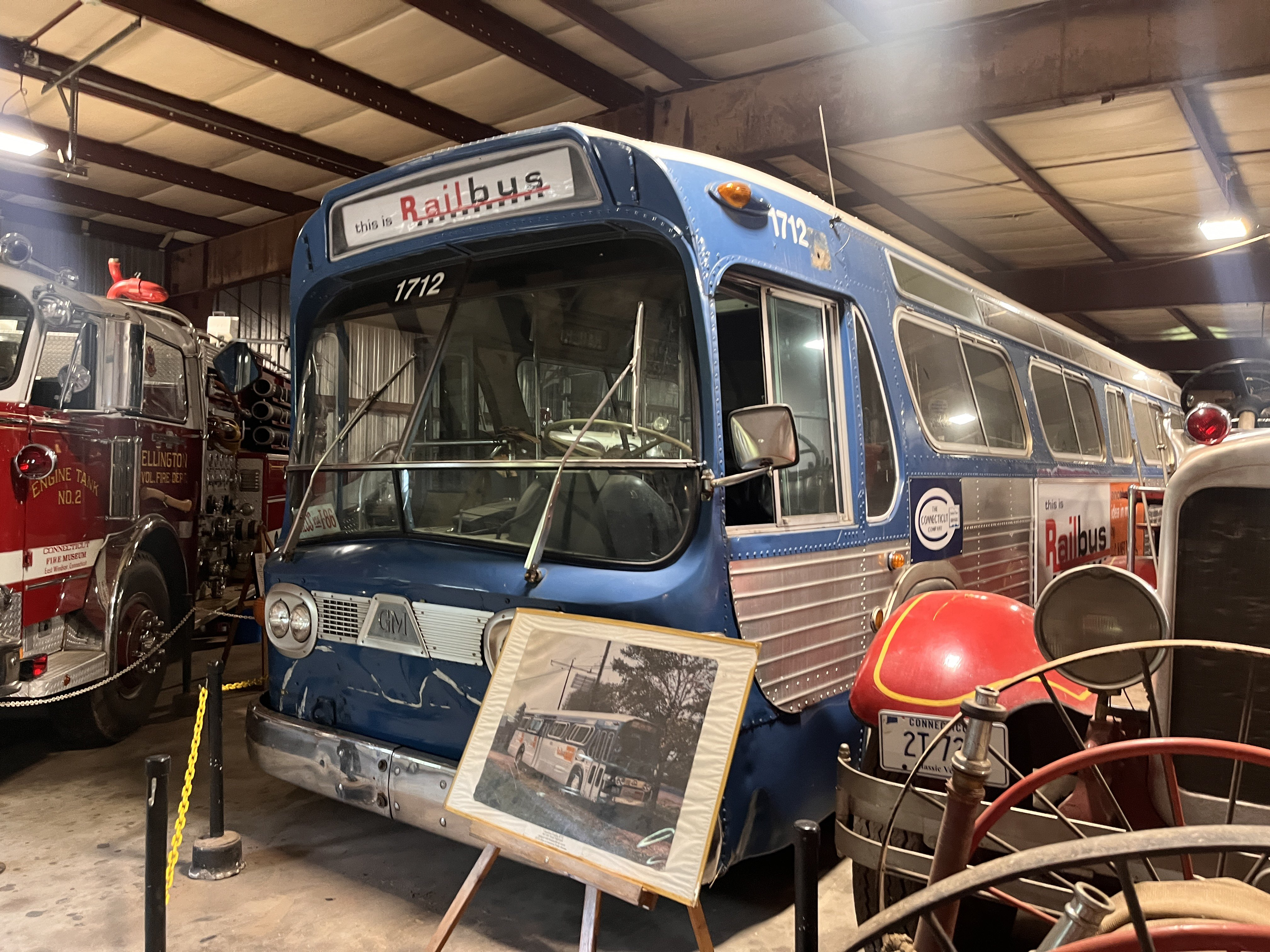
The Railbus was a late-1960s Connecticut Company experiment to combine rail and bus services to increase revenue. Now preserved at the Connecticut Trolley Museum.

Although Connecticut's bus services were still profitable in the early-1950s, by the 1960s profitability had significantly decreased. In June 1964 the Connecticut Company was sold to transportation and insurance magnate E. Clayton Gengras for $3,225,000. It was hoped by Hartford's chamber of commerce that under Gengras the Connecticut Company could become the core of a new "mass transit district" since it was no longer affiliated with the bankrupt New Haven Railroad. Pursuant to Gengras' plan to "make some money with [the Connecticut Company]", revenues did increase significantly following his acquisition. Despite these higher revenues, even in 1964 there were concerns over the long-term viability of Hartford's bus operations in private hands. George J. Ritter, a member of the "in standby" Greater Hartford Mass Transit District (MTD/GHTD), stated that "the new Connecticut Company is no savior for mass transit in Hartford... we still have a sick company." Gengras' reduction in Connecticut Company expenses was mostly through the discontinuation of less profitable services, although there were notable layoffs, fare increases, and attempts to capitalize through a number of experimental services. Some of these experimental services included deluxe express buses with free newspapers, downtown Hartford shuttles, the Railbus, which could run both on rail and road, vacation tours, and park-and-ride commuter on-demand express bus reservations using computers ("bus by request").

These changes, notably service reductions and layoffs, created much dissatisfaction among employees, resulting in a 27-day long strike in 1965 among all Connecticut Company divisions.

Under Gengras the company first expanded in October 1967 when it acquired the Middletown area H&W Transit Company, although even this was ineffective at increasing ridership with declines in riders' perceived quality of Connecticut Company services and the reduction of its routes' frequencies. In September 1968 the Connecticut Company expanded again when it acquired the Silver Lane Bus Company of Manchester.

In August 1971 a "massive" reduction in service was planned, with all Sundays trips to be eliminated, as well as most on evenings and Saturdays. In total the cuts represented around two thirds of all evening trips from Monday to Saturday should they be implemented. The drastic nature of these cuts prompted many in state and local government to propose action. State Senator Joe Lieberman urged the consideration of the state to at least subsidize bus services, but even go so far as to assume some of their operations or operate them outright if necessary. The still "in standby" GHTD sought to gather funds from the state to acquire the Connecticut Company before any service cuts could be approved by the Connecticut Public Utilities Commission (PUC).

Although there was considerable support for GHTD to acquire the Connecticut Company, the PUC ruled that the Connecticut Company "could continue to provide service" while GHTD "could not do so". On September 4 the Connecticut Company's reduced schedules were implemented, although four Hartford routes were run with marginal daytime service on Sundays.

In September 1971, days before its reduced schedules took effect, the Connecticut Company filed a request with the PUC in an attempt to suspend all of its services in its Stamford division, as well as to increase fares in Hartford and New Haven. Neither of these requests were approved.

The first state relief for the Connecticut Company came in April 1972 when it paid for new buses, although no further subsidy was provided.

Particularly due to the 1973 strikes of the employees of the Connecticut Company and CR&L, the Connecticut Department of Transportation became more involved with bus services in Connecticut. CTDOT noted in its annual Transportation Master Plan that year that "if the present trend continues, there will be minimal local bus service by 1980" and that "the service that exists today has not been capable of attracting or persuading the automobile driver to abandon his auto ride to the bus". In the following years, CTDOT began providing more aid to Connecticut transit districts.

The CR&L surrendered its last operating transit franchises in 1973, and in June 1976 Gengras sold the three remaining divisions of the Connecticut Company (Hartford, New Haven, and Stamford) to the State of Connecticut.

=== Public ownership (1976–present) ===
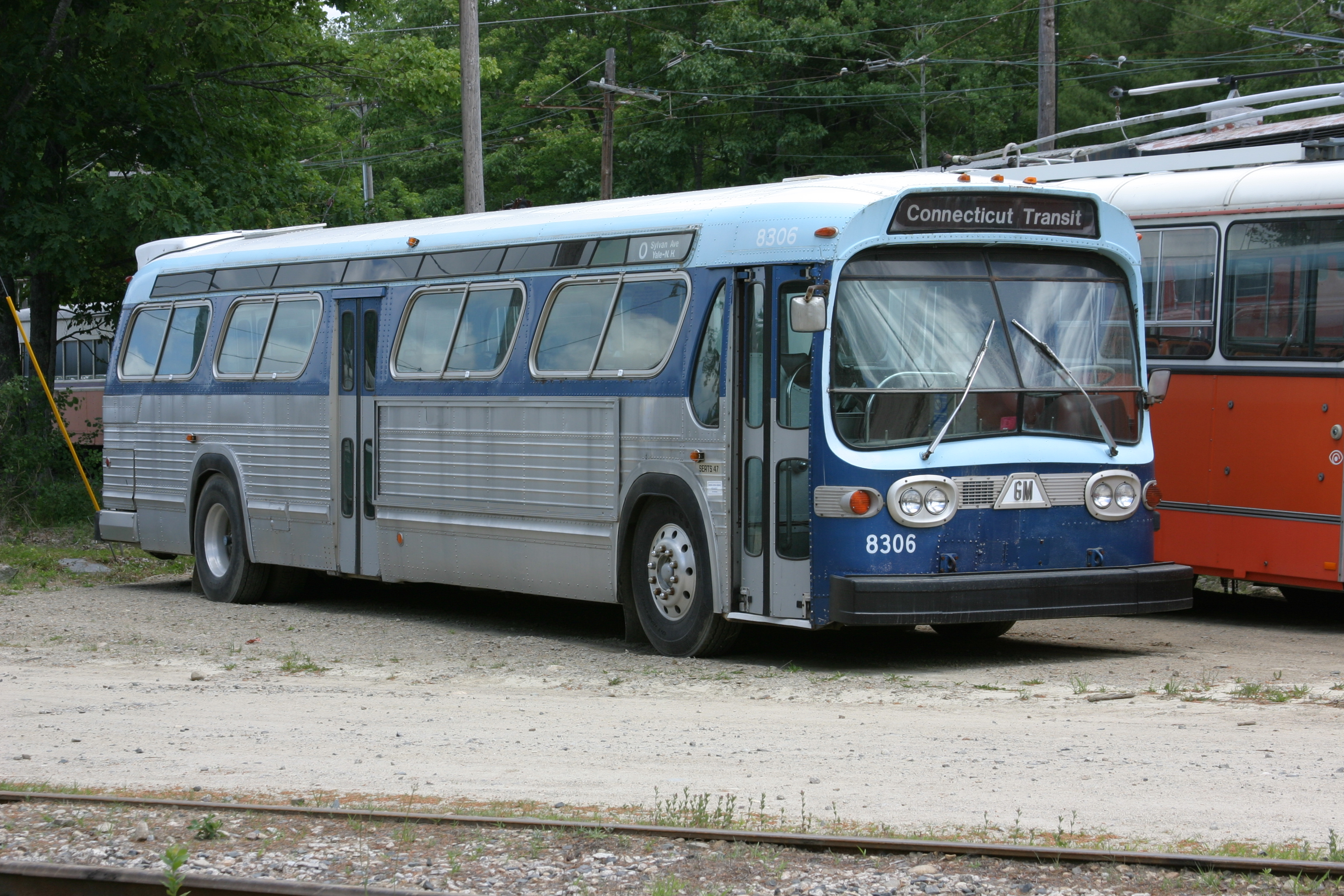
Connecticut Transit bus #8306, built in 1983, at the Seashore Trolley Museum

When the Connecticut Department of Transportation acquired the assets of the Connecticut Company, it contracted with a private management company to operate the system. Beginning in 1979, First Transit operated CT Transit's three original divisions in Hartford, New Haven, and Stamford through its subsidiary HNS Management. Although HNS Management operates the buses and operations themselves, it is CTDOT which manages matters such as procurement, routes, and planning. In December 2022, CTDOT announced it had switched its operating contract from First Transit to RATP Dev USA, an American subsidiary of France's state-owned RATP Group.

On April 1, 2022, CTDOT announced it had suspended fares on all public transit buses in Connecticut, which was launched in response to sharp ridership decreases following the outbreak of the COVID-19 pandemic, and heightened inflation. By September 2022, bus ridership in some CT Transit Divisions had exceeded pre-Covid levels. Fares resumed on April 1, 2023.

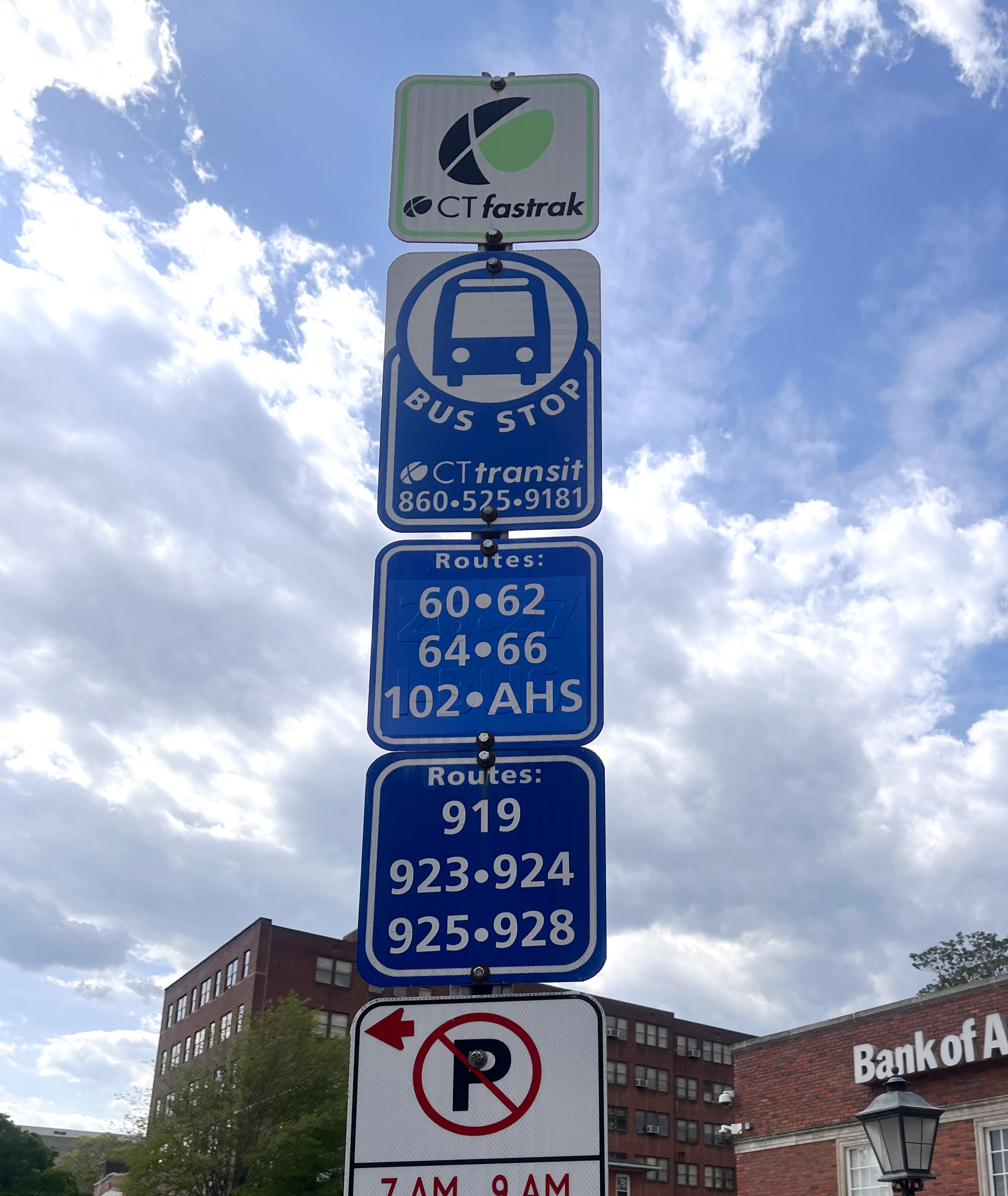
A CT Transit bus stop in Downtown Hartford with local, express, shuttle, and Fastrak bus services.

== Organization ==
CT Transit is managed by CTDOT and HNS Management is the company's largest contractor, (largely) operating the Hartford, New Haven, and Stamford divisions. However, CT Transit contracts a number of different companies and agencies with the CTDOT-led "core" providing supervision and coordination between them. In some ways CT Transit serves as a "brand" under which companies can operate their services while being part of a larger system. Because of its reliance on contractors however, CTDOT route planning can be significantly impacted by operators' decisions, and contract disputes have led to service cuts when agreements could not be reached.

Routes were first assigned letter designations in the Hartford area by the Connecticut Company in December 1964.

=== Divisions ===
CT Transit is arranged into five divisions, although some divisions serve more than one city. In addition, some divisions' services are operated by a single contractor while others are operated by multiple. Given CTDOT's supervisory role however, changes to improve consistency among the different divisions were made in the 2000s and 2010s, and today the divisions themselves have little effect beyond administration and direct operations. CT Transit's divisions are:

- Hartford: Operated by RATP Dev USA, an American subsidiary of France's state-owned RATP Group. Inter-agency connections to Enfield, NWCTD, PVTA, RVT, WRTD.
- New Britain and Bristol: Operated by HNS, New Britain Transportation, Dattco. Inter-agency connection to RVT.
- New Haven: Operated by RATP Dev USA. Inter-agency connections to GBT, Milford, Norwalk, RVT.
- Stamford: Operated by RATP Dev USA. Inter-agency connections to New Haven Line, Bee-Line, GBT, HART, Hudson Link, Milford, Norwalk.
- Waterbury, Meriden and Wallingford: Operated by Northeast Transportation Company. Interagency connections to NWCTD, RVT.

=== Funding ===
CTtransit's annual revenue is primarily made up of fare revenue, advertising, and reimbursements for services through contracts with state agencies (primarily access to jobs). The State of Connecticut funds the operations of CTtransit in the amount of the annual operating deficit.

== Services ==
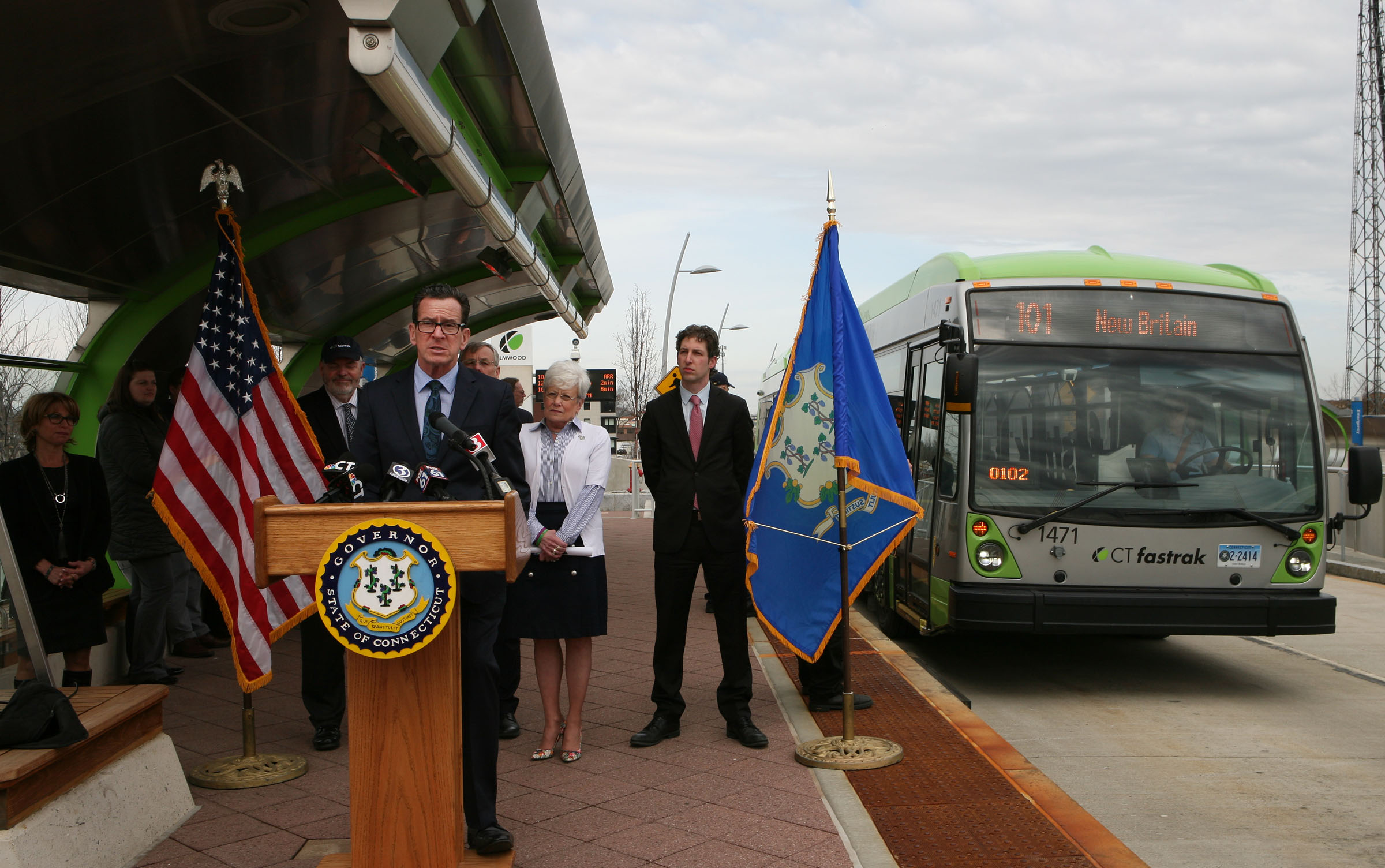
An event held for CT Fastrak's third anniversary in 2018 at Elmwood Station. Then-governor Dannel Malloy is standing at the podium.

=== CT Fastrak ===
Although originally conceived in the late-1990s, CT Fastrak opened in 2015 as the first bus rapid transit system in Connecticut and second in New England.

=== Express Routes ===
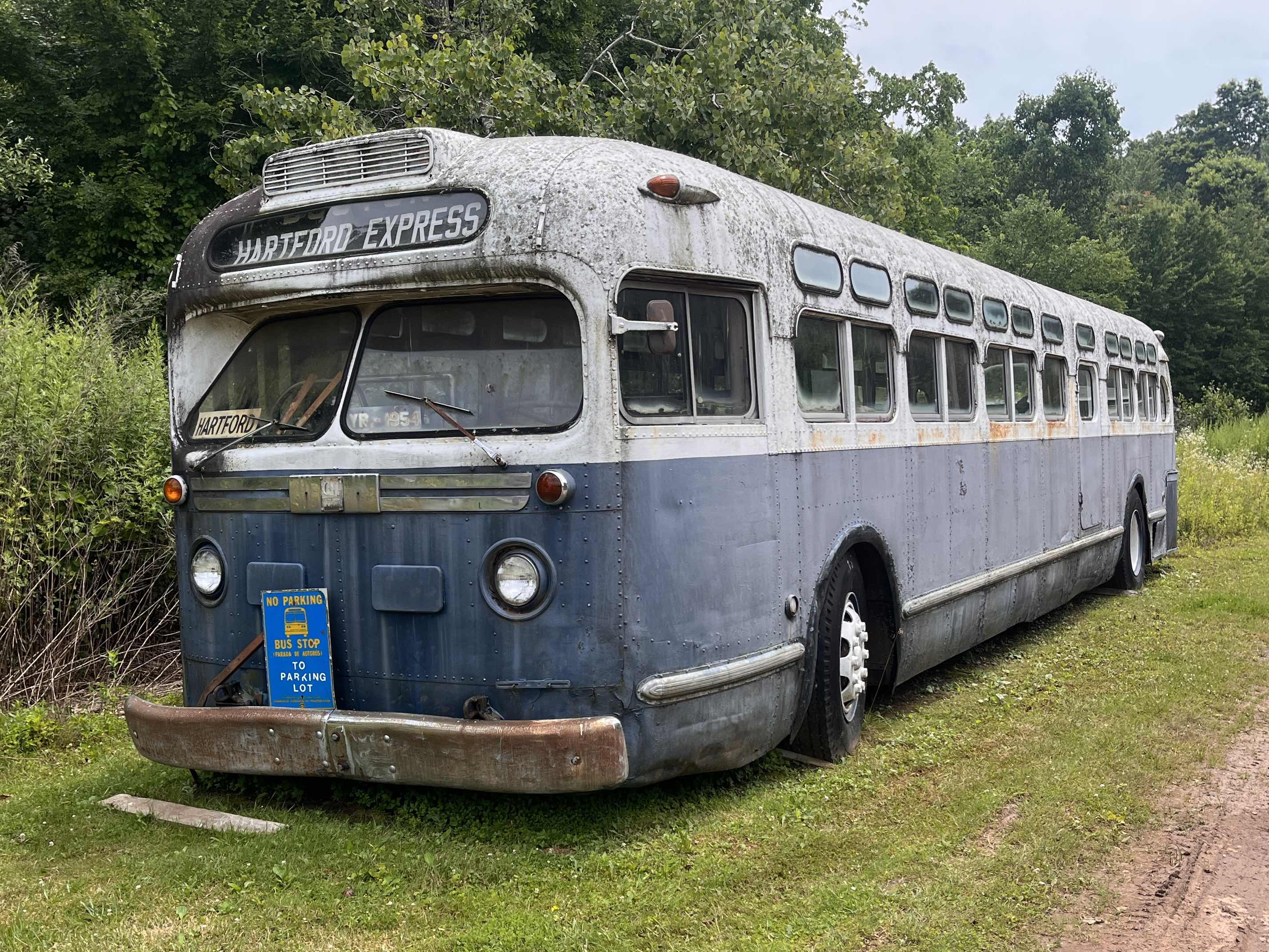
An early Hartford Express bus owned by the Connecticut Trolley Museum

Although early attempts at deluxe commuter express buses by the Connecticut Company were a failure, the organization did begin to seriously consider regularly-operating express buses as early as 1970 with plans for an express bus from Unionville and Farmington to Hartford via I-84.

The first express routes operated by CT Transit were those inherited from the Connecticut Company which were initiated from 1972 until the company's acquisition by the Connecticut Department of Transportation (CTDOT) in 1976. The creation of the routes was prompted by the CTDOT hoping to "decrease automobile traffic into the major urban areas". The first express route operated was from Hartford to the Corbins Corner area of West Hartford, and began operation on January 17, 1972. The route was initially part of a pilot program which was extended due to promising results. 15 express routes were in operation by the time CT Transit (then Connecticut Transit) was created, with 13 operating around Hartford, and 2 operating around New Haven respectively.

CT Transit's first new express route came in 1998 with the creation of the I-Bus (now Route 971) between Stamford and White Plains, New York. Originally begun as a pilot funded by the Departments of Transportation of Connecticut and New York, the route would be added to regular service as CT Transit's only interstate express route.

Despite the introduction of the I-Bus, a number of express routes were combined or eliminated over the years following their initial introductions. Although some new routes such as the CI (Correctional Institutes) and IND (Windsor/Bloomfield Industrial) briefly existed around the turn of the millennium, the total number of express routes in 2003 was down to 12, all of which were in the Hartford area. Still intended mostly for commuters, only three routes offered any sort of mid-day service alongside that during rush hour. To meet its budget that year, schedules were constrained even further despite the reduced number of routes. Although unsuccessful, the proposed cuts also originally included eliminating express service to Unionville.

Around 2008, previously having all of its express services operated by HNS, CT Transit began contracting commuter services from other operators in Connecticut including Dattco and Peter Pan. With other operators' services, new routes extended the CT Transit system, such as to Torrington and Winsted. These new routes also provided express connections between CT Transit divisions, such as with the Hartford-New Haven Express and Waterbury Express respectively.

After the creation of CT Fastrak, some routes were altered to serve new CT Fastrak stations. Also, express service to UConn began, operated by Peter Pan, Dattco, and HNS, which was originally planned to be part of an expanded Fastrak service known as "Fastrak East"

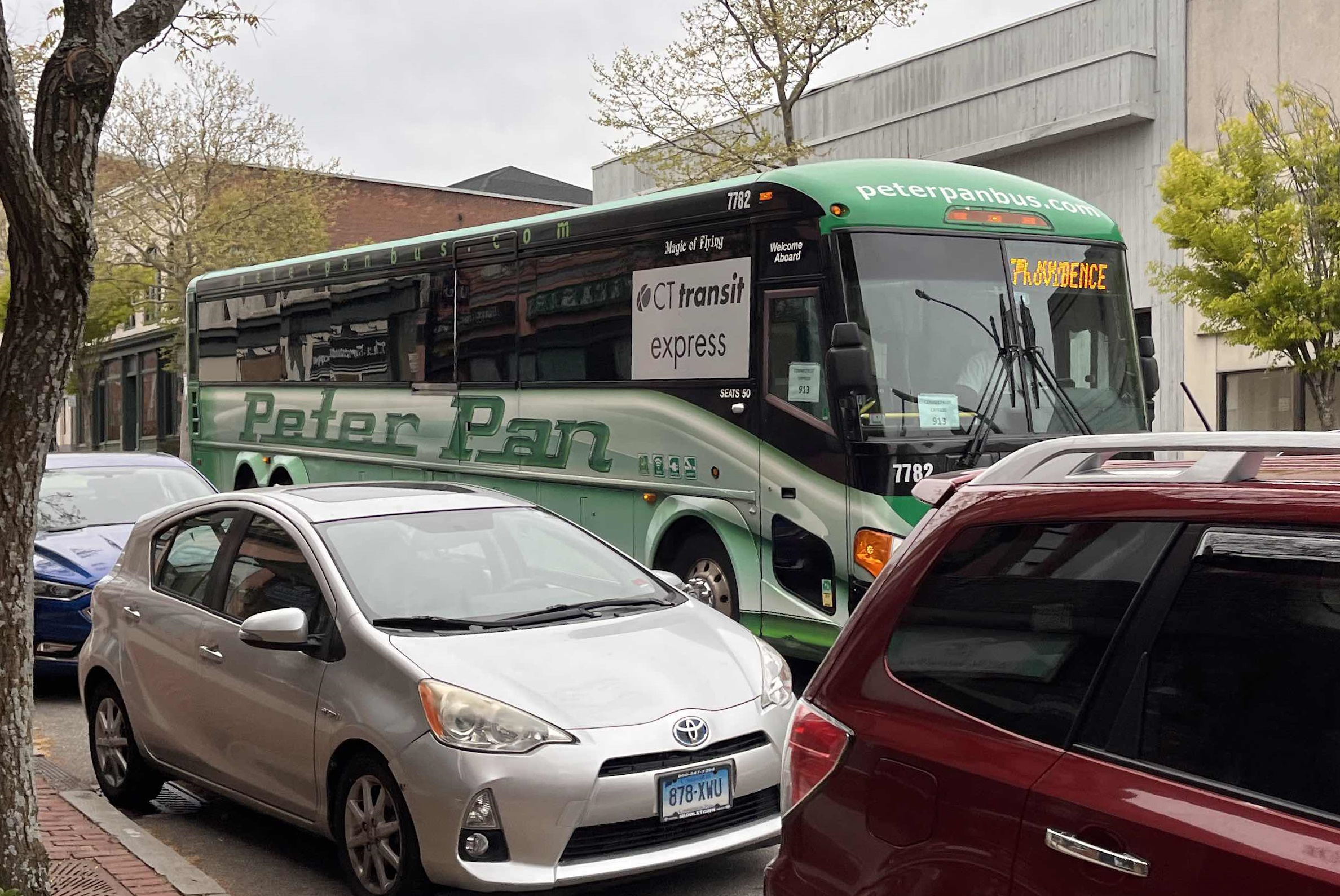
Peter Pan's Hartford-Providence route in Downtown Willimantic in April 2023. As is indicated by a decal on the windows, the bus is in CT Transit contract service, although only while in Connecticut.

In August 2021, due to the decreased ridership resulting from the COVID-19 pandemic, many of CT Transit's routes were consolidated or had their service reduced, and express routes were no exception. Routes 917 (Tolland Express), 924 (Southington-Cheshire Express), 925 (Waterbury Express) were suspended, and their services were partially integrated into other routes. Beginning in August 2021, CT Transit contracted Peter Pan's services in the state of Connecticut along its Hartford-Providence route. Designated Route PPB, Peter Pan buses are used, although both Peter Pan and CT Transit fares are accepted for intrastate travel in Connecticut.

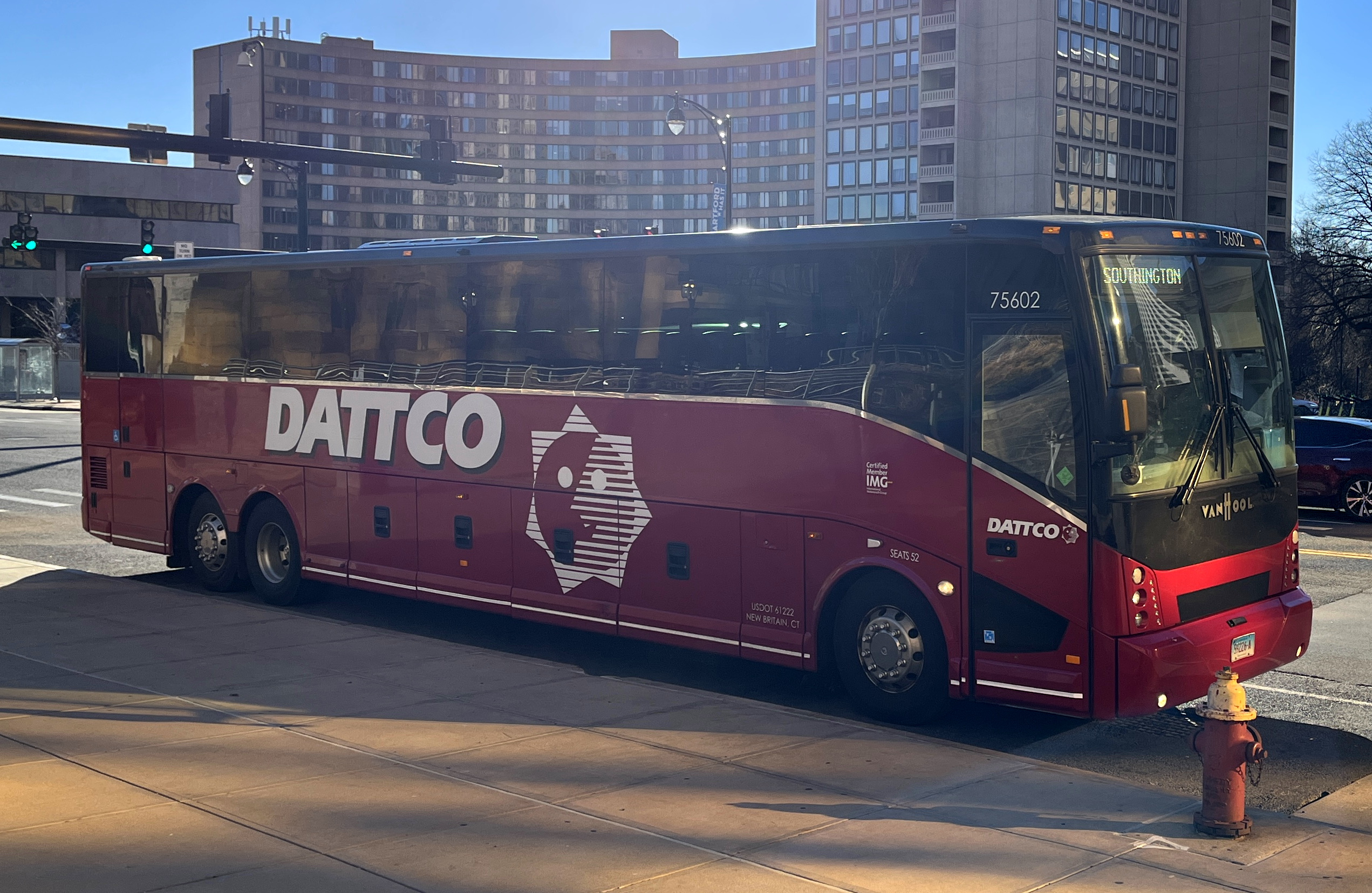
The Dattco Southington Express on February 18, 2022, its last day of service

A contract dispute between the CTDOT and Dattco in late-2021 caused the Dattco-operated express routes, which were contracted by CT Transit starting in 2008, to be dropped from CT Transit. The three routes affected by the contract dispute were 921 (Middletown/Old Saybrook Express), 923 (Bristol Express), and 928 (Southington-Cheshire-Waterbury Express). Although Dattco continued operating the routes themselves in the immediate aftermath, service was significantly reduced, operating only a few times per day on each route, and in the case of the former Route 928, it was shortened from Waterbury only to Cheshire. Citing mounting costs, Dattco ended service on all three routes on February 18, 2022. After a four-month gap in service, a contract agreement was reached in June. With a new contract, Route 928 resumed operation as part of CT Transit once more on June 22, and Routes 921 and 923 resumed later in August 2022.

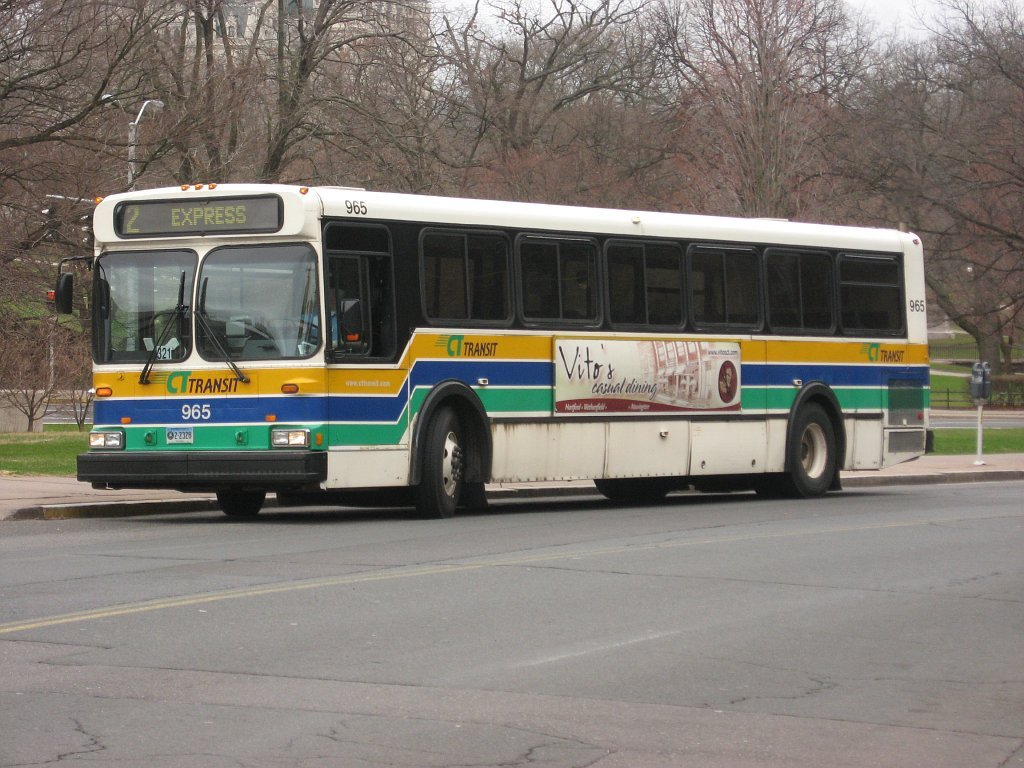
A CT Transit Express bus serving Route 2 (now 902) in 2007. The bus uses CT Transit's blue, green, white, and yellow color scheme from that time.

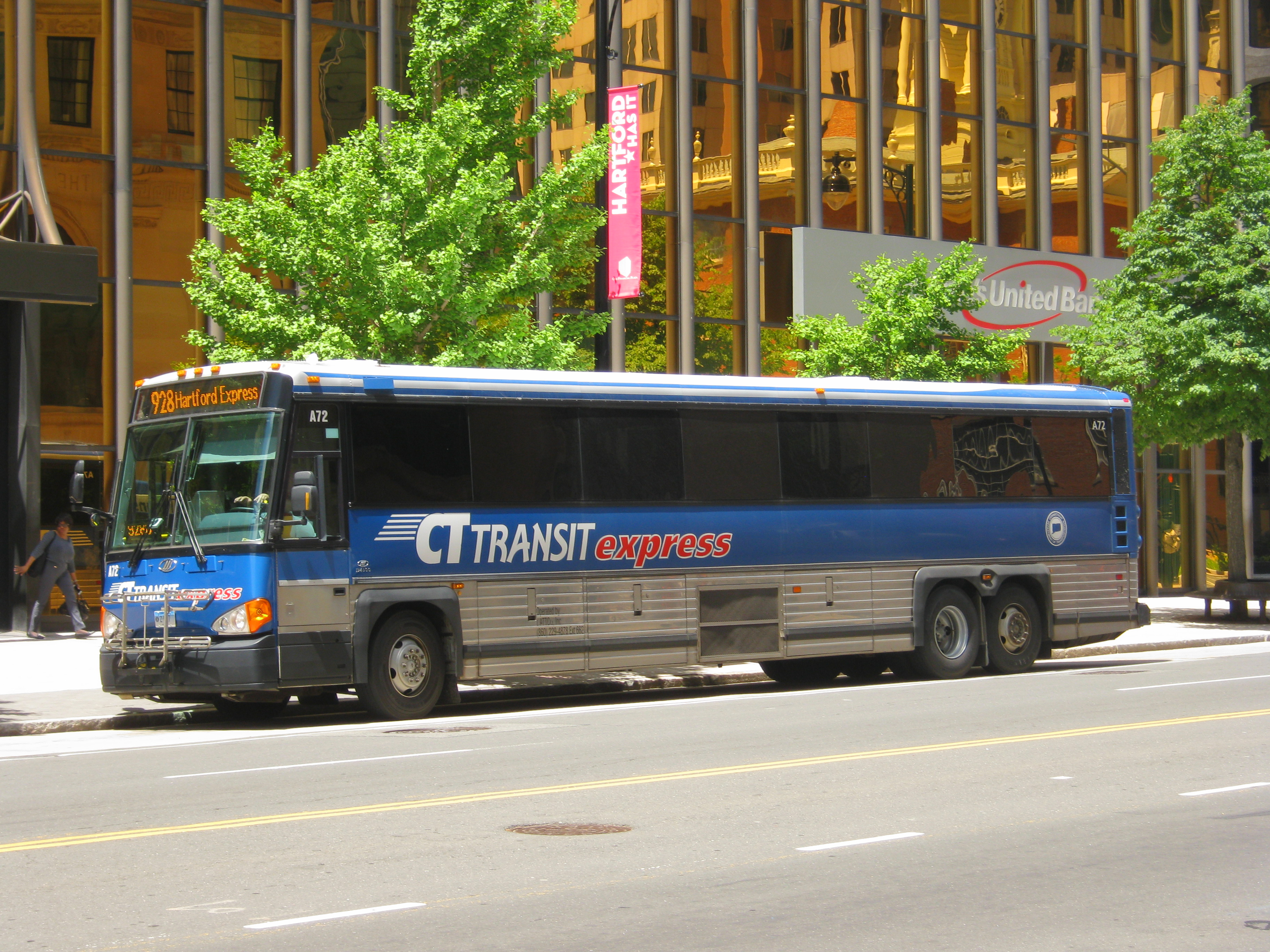
A CT Transit express bus in Hartford serving Route 928 in 2018. The bus uses CT Transit's current blue and silver color scheme.

=== Paratransit ===
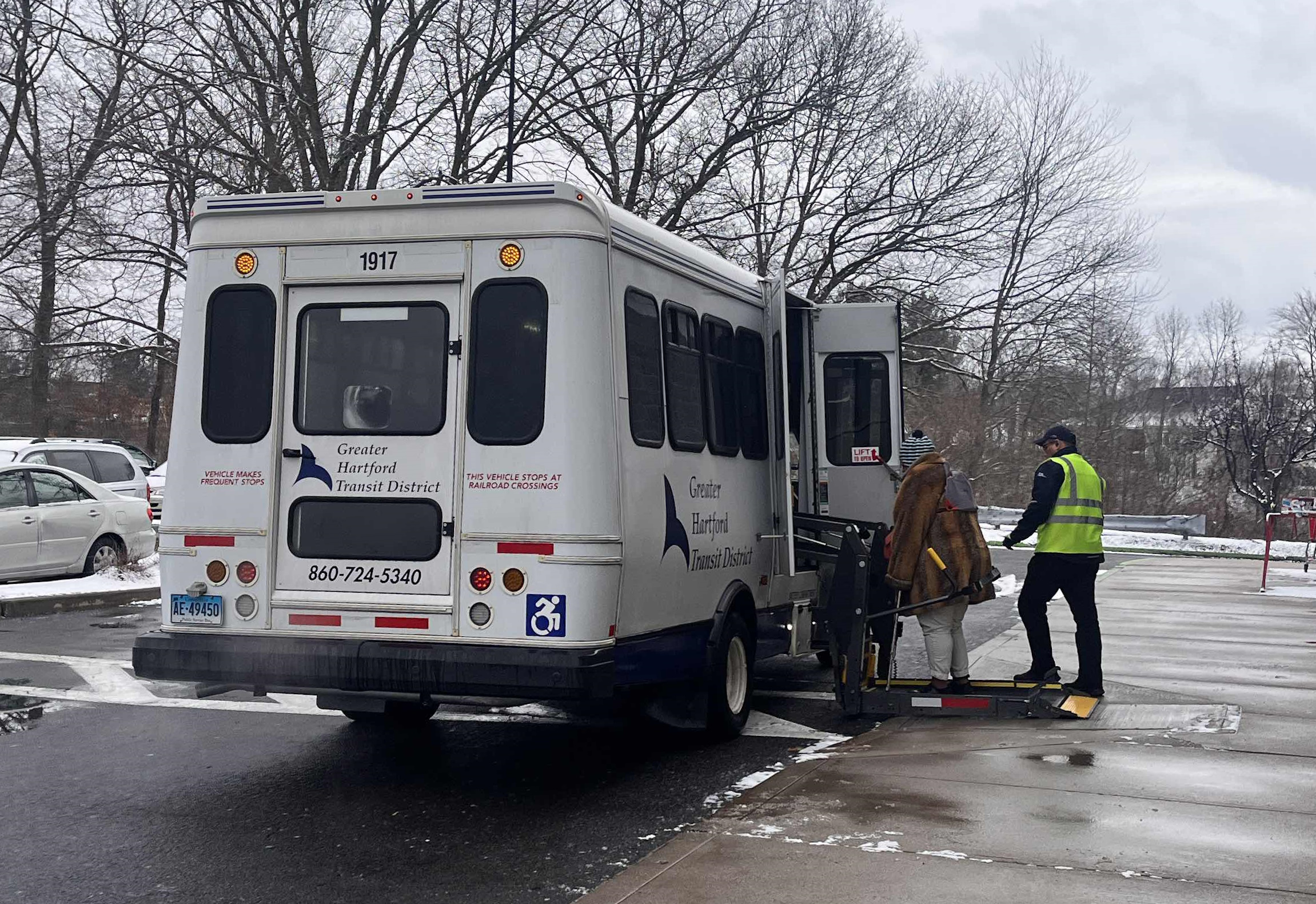
A woman in Manchester boarding a GHTD bus. CT Transit serves this same location, although its buses lack many accessibility features.

==== CT Transit and GHTD ====
In 1991 the Greater Hartford Transit District (GHTD), began paratransit services through a collaboration between CT Transit and the CTDOT. The GHTD's paratransit dial-a-ride services intend to provide ADA access to areas where CT Transit's routes cannot by deviating .75 miles from existing routes and utilizing accessible vehicles. However, unlike many other paratransit services, the GHTD's operation as an accessible "alternative" to CT Transit's routes means that it mirrors where CT Transit buses already serve, at the same times the buses normally operate. GHTD's mirroring of CT Transit services has created difficulties for some riders who live in areas underserved by CT Transit bus services.

==== NETPS/CT Transit Paratransit ====
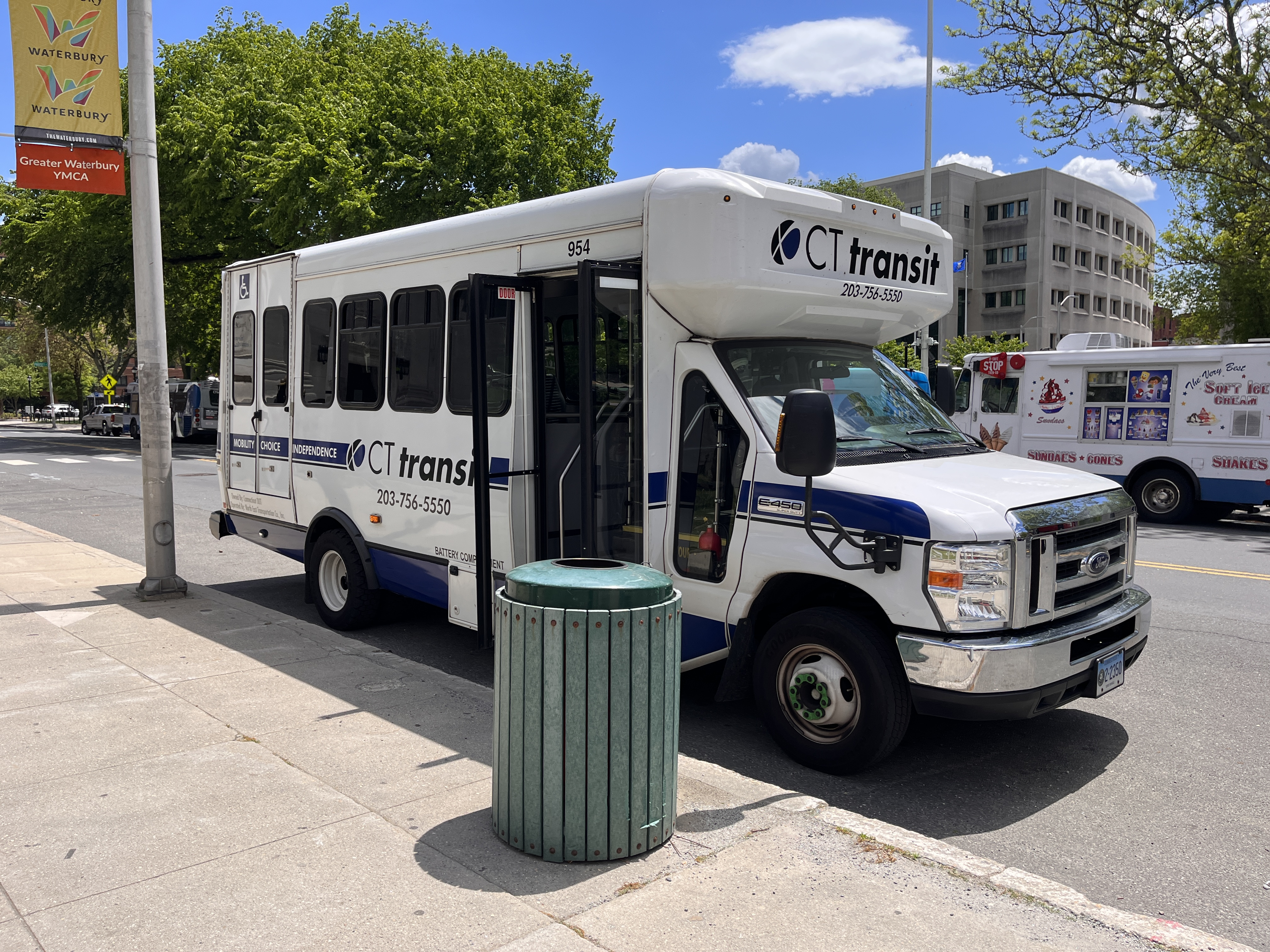
An NET-operated CT Transit paratransit bus in Waterbury

In most areas of Connecticut, CT Transit does not operate paratransit services. However, in the Meriden, Wallingford, and Waterbury areas the Northeast Transportation Company (NET), operates paratransit services under CT Transit livery. NET's service provides dial-a-ride access to residents living in specific Waterbury-area towns as well as accessible alternatives to CT Transit routes for those who within .75 miles of them. NET's paratransit is officially referred to as NETPS (Northeast Transportation Paratransit Service), synonymous with the service offered before NET became a CT Transit contractor.

== Environment ==
In February 2012, CT Transit acquired a PureCell stationary fuel cell system for their headquarters on Leibert Road in Hartford. The fuel cell provides 400 kilowatts (kW) of power to the 330,000 square feet (31,000 m^{2}) facility. Thermal energy from the fuel cell will be used to pre-heat two boilers that support the building's primary heating system.

By generating power on-site with a fuel cell, CTtransit will prevent the release of more than 827 metric tons of carbon dioxide annually – the equivalent of planting more than 191 acres (77 ha) of trees. The reduction in nitrogen oxide emissions compared to a conventional power plant are equal to the environmental benefit of removing more than 102 cars from the road. In addition to the reduction in greenhouse gas emissions, the PureCell system will enable CTtransit to save nearly 3.6 million gallons of water annually.

As of July 2022, CT Transit operated 12 electric buses. In July 2022, one caught fire, requiring the hospitalization of three people. This incident resulted in the temporary suspension of electric buses from CT Transit's fleet, which ended on July 31, 2023.
