= Magic Carpet Bus =

Bus service in Enfield, Connecticut

Coordinates: 41.9964°N 72.5537°W

- Parent: Town of Enfield
- Founded: January 2013
- Locale: Enfield, Connecticut
- Service area: Enfield, Connecticut
- Service type: Local bus service
- Routes: 2
- Operator: Enfield Transit (Town of Enfield, Connecticut)
- Website: Official Website

The Magic Carpet Bus is a local bus service in Enfield, Connecticut. The system operates two routes in downtown Enfield and provides transfer to CT Transit service to Hartford. ADA paratransit is also operated as part of the Magic Carpet system within .75 miles of its routes.

Starting in the 1990s Enfield had local bus service in the form of PVTA Route Red 16, which originated in Springfield and continued down to Enfield center and Asnuntuck Community College. In 2002 the route was cancelled, as the town of Enfield was unable to pay the $70,000 PVTA required of it that year.

Between 2002 and 2012 Enfield was served by only two public bus routes. One route was run by CT Transit (Route 5; now 905) and the other by PVTA (Route G5), with both meeting at the Enfield MassMutual office.

With a grant from the United States Department of Housing and Urban Development received by the Capitol Region Council of Governments, a report regarding public transport in Enfield was created in 2012. From this report, it was concluded that two local bus routes be created, each following a similar route in opposing directions of one another.

Magic Carpet service began in January 2013 and operates on two routes, the Blue Line and the Yellow Line. Blue Line service typically begins at 7 AM and ends at 11 PM and Yellow Line service typically begins at 7:30 AM and ends at 6:30 PM, Monday through Friday. The Blue Line also operates 7 AM to 9 PM on Saturday.
