= Stamford Street Railroad =

Streetcar operator in Connecticut, U.S.

The Stamford Street Railroad Company
Overview
- Locale: Stamford, Connecticut
- Dates of operation: 1886–1905
- Successor: Connecticut Company

The Stamford Street Railroad Company, often shorted to the Stamford Company, was a street railway company serving Stamford, Connecticut. It began in 1886 as the Stamford Horse Railroad Company, and operated independently for nearly a decade until it was acquired by the New York, New Haven and Hartford Railroad in 1895. It was then acquired by the Consolidated Railway Company (renamed the Connecticut Company shortly thereafter) on September 26, 1905. The Connecticut Company continued to operate streetcars in Stamford until November 1933.

== History ==
=== Stamford Horse Railroad Company ===
Starting in 1866, there had been discussions about creating a horse-drawn streetcar company to service Stamford, Connecticut. A charter for such a company was secured in 1870, but it expired before any plans could be made.

A new charter such a service was licensed in 1886, creating the Stamford Horse Railroad Company. Beginning on January 31, 1887, horse-drawn streetcars began running in Stamford.

During its early days, the Stamford Company lost money, and had numerous disputes with the Borough of Stamford.

The Stamford Horse Railroad Company went bankrupt in December 1888.

=== Stamford Street Railroad Company ===
Following its bankruptcy, the Stamford Horse Railroad Company underwent a period of reorganization. As part of the reorganization, the company was sold, and the Connecticut General Assembly approved its use of electricity to power its cars. The Stamford Horse Railroad Company was reorganized as the Stamford Street Railroad Company in 1889. Despite its name change, the Stamford Company continued to run horse-drawn streetcars into the early 1890s. In 1892, the company announced it would launched its first electric railroad, which ran along Shippan Avenue towards Shippan Point. In 1894, trolleys were approved to replace horse-drawn streetcars.

=== As a subsidiary ===
The New York, New Haven and Hartford Railroad acquired a controlling stake in the Stamford Street Railroad Company on or about April 1, 1895.

Around the time of its acquisition by the New York, New Haven and Hartford Railroad, the Stamford Company was in an unfavorable financial condition, and incurred a deficit of $27,381.88, per report filed on September 30, 1895. In the years following its acquisition, the New Haven Company paid considerable sums of money to improve its financial standing, restore its depleted working capital, and to provide part of the funds needed for electrification, and other projects.

In October 1895, the company sold off its horses to fully replace with electric-powered trolleys. As of that year, the company had 7 miles (11 km), which increased to 10 miles (16 km) the next year.

The New York, New Haven and Hartford Railroad opened trolley service along the New Canaan Branch in the summer of 1898, which was connected to Stamford's existing trolley service.

On September 26, 1905, the Consolidated Railway Company (the Connecticut Company) acquired the assets of the Stamford Company. Stamford Street Railroad was then merged with the Greenwich Tramway and the New York & Stamford Railway, and the combined entity was called the Stamford Street Railway, which boasted about 50 miles (80 km) of tracks.

In 1914, the system connected to the nearby city of Norwalk.

Jitney service began in Stamford in the spring of 1915, signalling the beginning of an era of competition with buses. In the following years, an increasing number of Stamford's streetcar tracks were paved over to make room for automobiles. In the summer of 1921, the Church Street spur in the neighborhood of Glenbrook was discontinued, and local service was replaced with a bus service.

The Connecticut Company continued to operate streetcars in Stamford until November 11, 1933, when the last streetcar left Stamford for good at 11:35pm.

== Operations ==
During the time of the Stamford Horse Railroad Company (from 1886 to 1888), the company charged a fare of fare within 5¢ the Stamford borough limits. Customers could also buy 11 tickets for 50¢. Tickets came with one free transfer.

Throughout its history, the Stamford Street Railroad had several lines, including a handful that connected Stamford to nearby towns and cities. To Stamford's west, the company ran a line along West Main Street to connect to Greenwich and Port Chester, as well as one along Southfield Avenue, which connected to Fairfield Avenue and Shore Road in Greenwich. To its east, the company ran a line along East Main Street and up the Post Road (contemporary U.S. Route 1) to Darien and Norwalk, where it connected to local streetcars there, as well as Roton Point, a popular amusement park at the time. Within Stamford's South End, the company also ran service along State Street, Railroad Pace, South Pacific Street, Manhattan Street, Walnut Street, and up Atlantic Street north to Downtown. Within Downtown, lines ran along Atlantic Street, briefly along Broad Street, Summer Street up to Bull's Head, and Elm Street. Towards the southeast, branching off of Elm Street, service was run along Cove Road in the Cove neighborhood, and along Shippan Avenue and Fairview Avenue in Shippan and Shippan Point. Service also extended northeast along Glenbrook Road to Camp Avenue in the Glenbrook neighborhood.

The company had 7 miles (11 km) of track in 1895, and 10 miles (16 km) as of 1896. As of its September 26, 1905 acquisition by the Consolidated Railway Company (the Connecticut Company), the Stamford Street Railroad had 18.389 miles (29.594 km) of main track, and 0.390 miles (0.628 km) of sidings, for a total track length of 18.779 miles (30.222 km). After its combination with the Greenwich Tramway and the New York & Stamford Railway, the resulting entity had about 50 miles (80 km) of tracks.

The company's electric trolley originally ran at a speed of about 15 miles per hour (24 km/h), although after concerns were lodged that this was too fast, the cars' speeds were reduced to 8 miles per hour (13 km/h).

Originally, Stamford had enacted an ordinance requiring streetcars to continuously ring a bell when crossing and intersection or passing another car. After noise complaints were lodged, including a poem published in the Stamford Advocate, the ordinance was amended so as not to mandate the continuous bell ringing.

== Rolling stock ==
As of 1895, the company had 13 streetcars. An 1896 description of new cars purchased said that "the upper part of the body is red and the lower part is sort of cream", and featured a mahogany trim.

As of its September 26, 1905 acquisition by the Consolidated Railway Company (the Connecticut Company), the Stamford Street Railroad had 33 streetcars.

== See also ==
- Connecticut Company
- New York, New Haven and Hartford Railroad
