= Connecticut Company =

US electric street railway company

- Connecticut Company (blue) and other New Haven electric railway subsidiaries

Overview
- Locale: New England, United States
- Dates of operation: 1907–1976

The Connecticut Company was the primary electric street railway company in the U.S. state of Connecticut, operating both city and rural trolleys and freight service. It was controlled by the New York, New Haven and Hartford Railroad (New Haven), which also controlled most steam railroads in the state. After 1936, when one of its major leases was dissolved, it continued operating streetcars and, increasingly, buses in certain Connecticut cities until 1976, when its assets were purchased by the state government.

== History ==
=== Formation and expansion ===
In 1895, after it acquired control of the New York and New England Railroad, the New Haven controlled almost 90% of the steam railroad mileage in Connecticut. That same year, it gained control of its first street railway, the Stamford Street Railroad, on about April 1. That company, which operated local lines in the city of Stamford, was in bad shape financially, and the owners of a majority of its stocks and bonds, wishing to get rid of their investments, found a willing buyer in the New Haven. The second acquisition was also a local system, the Meriden Electric Railroad in Meriden, which the New Haven bought on October 18, 1895, from its president.

However, the next electric railway the New Haven gained control of was a long rural trolley line in eastern Connecticut. Sanderson & Porter, construction contractors, were building the People's Tramway between Danielson and Putnam, parallel to the New Haven-controlled Norwich and Worcester Railroad, and on September 18, 1899 the New Haven signed a contract with Sanderson & Porter to control the line. This agreement was modified on July 18, 1901, by which time Sanderson & Porter had gained control of the Worcester and Webster Street Railway and Webster and Dudley Street Railway in Massachusetts, and subscribed to the stock of the Thompson Tramway, which planned to connect the two segments, thus forming a continuous line between Danielson and Worcester, Massachusetts. Under the terms of this new agreement, the Thompson Tramway was renamed Worcester and Connecticut Eastern Railway on January 24, 1902, and later that year received the stocks of the three other companies, as well as the newly incorporated Danielson and Norwich Street Railway, which was to continue the line south to Norwich. The arrangement was completed on September 29, 1902, when the Worcester and Connecticut Eastern leased the two Massachusetts companies and acquired the property of the two Connecticut companies. Almost simultaneously the New Haven gained control of the line, which, after the completion of several segments in 1903, extended from Worcester south to Central Village, with branches in Connecticut from Elmville to East Killingly (where it connected with the Providence and Danielson Railway to Providence, Rhode Island) and Central Village to Moosup.

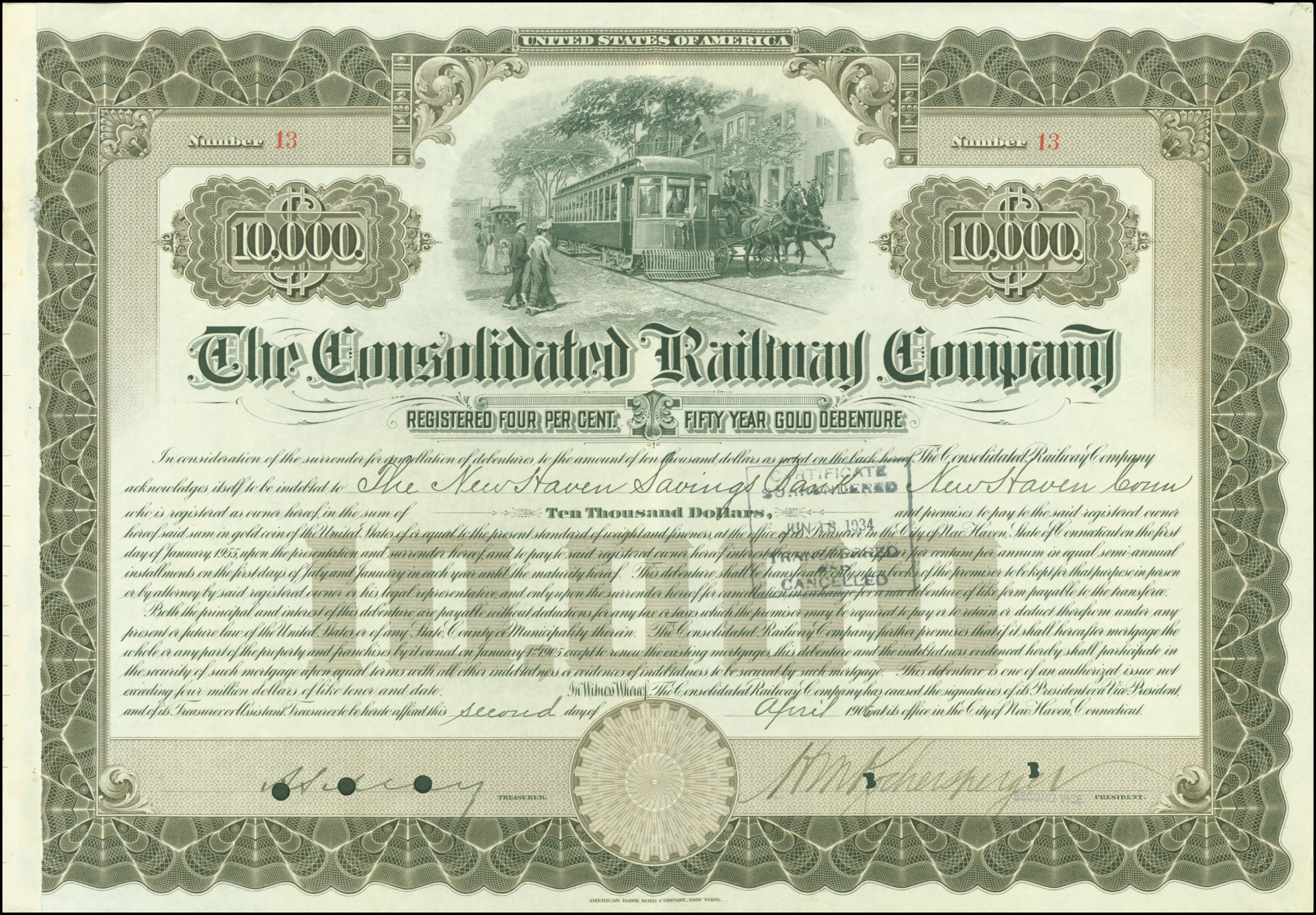
Gold Debenture of the Consolidated Railway Company, issued 2. February 1906

The New Haven used this new acquisition as an initial corporate shell for its electric subsidiaries, renaming it Consolidated Railway on May 18, 1904, and transferring the property of the Meriden Electric to it later that month and the stock of the Stamford Street Railroad to it in October. In the meantime, the New Haven bought control of the Fair Haven and Westville Railroad and conveyed its property to the Consolidated in late May. This company served the city of New Haven and surrounding areas, including intercity lines, in conjunction with the Connecticut Railway and Lighting Company, to Bridgeport (connecting at Woodmont) and Derby, the latter completed in late 1903. The Stamford Street Railroad also, in late 1903, opened a connection with the Greenwich Tramway, thus completing the trolley link between New Haven and the New York state line. The Wallingford Tramway was incorporated in 1903, and its unfinished property was conveyed to the Worcester and Connecticut Eastern on May 14, 1904, four days before the renaming. This company's line, from Wallingford south to the end of a Fair Haven and Westville line at Montowese, was completed by the Consolidated in late 1904, forming the final piece of a continuous electric railway route between New York City and Boston via Hartford, Springfield, and Worcester.

During the next few years, the New Haven, through the Consolidated Railway, acquired control of and later the property of many electric railways throughout the state. In order, these acquisitions were:

- Worcester and Southbridge Street Railway (Worcester to Sturbridge, Massachusetts): control May 25, 1904
- New London Street Railway (New London local lines), Norwich Street Railway (Norwich local lines), and Montville Street Railway (connection between the two): control July 30, 1904; property September 29, 1904
- Worcester and Blackstone Valley Street Railway (Worcester to Northbridge, Massachusetts): control September 22, 1904
- Middletown Street Railway (Middletown local lines and the charter of the Middletown and Meriden Traction Company to Meriden): control October 25, 1904; property November 28, 1904
- Greenwich Tramway and New York and Stamford Railway (extending the Stamford Street Railroad through Greenwich into New Rochelle, New York): control December 29, 1904; property (of the former only) September 19, 1905
- Berkshire Street Railway (long rural line in western Massachusetts): control January 18, 1905
- Springfield Street Railway (Springfield, Massachusetts local and suburban lines): control April 11, 1905
- Hartford Street Railway (Hartford local lines, including lines to Rainbow Park in Windsor, Newington, Wethersfield, East Windsor Hill, the East Hartford and Glastonbury Street Railway to South Glastonbury, and the Farmington Street Railway to Unionville): control April 3, 1905; property (except the Farmington Street Railway) September 19, 1905
- Suffield Street Railway (Suffield to Massachusetts state line, connecting with the Springfield Street Railway): control April 1905; property September 19, 1905
- Branford Lighting and Water Company (East Haven to Branford): control June 29, 1905; property September 19, 1905
- Willimantic Traction Company (Baltic, near Norwich, to Willimantic): control October 7, 1905; property December 6, 1905
- Worcester Consolidated Street Railway (Worcester, Massachusetts local and suburban lines): control in or after December 1905
- Hartford, Manchester and Rockville Tramway and Stafford Springs Street Railway (East Hartford to Stafford Springs via Rockville): control January 25, 1906; property (of the former only) March 26, 1906
- Hartford and Worcester Street Railway (franchise only): January 25, 1906
- Hartford and Middletown Street Railway (franchise only): March 13, 1906
- Torrington and Winsted Street Railway (Torrington to Winsted): control June 22, 1906

The property of the Stamford Street Railroad, control of which had been acquired in 1895, was conveyed to the Consolidated on September 26, 1905.

The effect of these transactions was to give the New Haven control of a large system of electric railways in Connecticut and Massachusetts, many of them connecting with each other. In the meantime, the United Gas Improvement Company of Philadelphia had put together its own system, including most of the mileage in Rhode Island and over one-quarter of the mileage in Connecticut, through subsidiaries Rhode Island Company and Connecticut Railway and Lighting Company. The latter owned the lines in the coastal towns between Stamford and West Haven, connecting with New Haven properties at both ends, as well as a rural line extending through the Naugatuck Valley from Stratford north to Seymour with local lines in Derby and vicinity. To the north, it controlled local and suburban lines in New Britain and Waterbury, connecting with the New Haven's lines at Newington and Mount Carmel. The Meriden, Southington and Compounce Tramway, also controlled by the United Gas Improvement Company, extended from the New Haven's local lines in Meriden to Lake Compounce, intersecting the ends of Waterbury and New Britain lines at Milldale and Southington. A continuous route between Stratford and Waterbury via Derby and Seymour was completed in 1907 by lessor Naugatuck Valley Electric Railway. The New Haven came to an agreement with the United Gas Improvement Company on December 19, 1906, whereby the Consolidated Railway leased the property of the Connecticut Railway and Lighting Company, and acquired the stock of the Meriden, Southington and Compounce Tramway, Rhode Island Company, and various power companies operating in Connecticut.

=== Formation of the Connecticut Company in 1907 ===
Expansion continued with the acquisition by the Consolidated Railway of control of the Waterbury and Pomperaug Valley Street Railway (Waterbury-Woodbury) on April 20, 1907 and the Thomaston Tramway (Waterbury-Thomaston) on May 29, 1907. Two days later, on May 31, the Consolidated was merged into the New Haven, and the Thomaston Tramway was renamed Connecticut Company, becoming the operator of all of the New Haven's electric railway properties formerly operated by the Consolidated. The Columbia Traction Company, which owned no railway but valuable charter privileges relating to power generation, was acquired by the New Haven on June 24 and merged with the Connecticut Company on June 30, 1909. The property of subsidiaries formerly controlled by the Consolidated was also conveyed to the New Haven for operation by the Connecticut Company, including the Meriden, Southington and Compounce Tramway (June 29, 1907), the Torrington and Winchester Street Railway (June 29, 1907), the Farmington Street Railway (December 31, 1907), and the Stafford Springs Street Railway (June 30, 1908). This left the New Haven as owner of all the property operated by the Connecticut Company except for that owned by the Connecticut Railway and Lighting Company, as well as the portion of the coastal line in West Haven owned by the West Shore Railway, which had been leased to the Fair Haven and Westville Railroad prior to its acquisition in 1904, and the short South Manchester Light, Power and Tramway Company, similarly leased to the Hartford, Manchester and Rockville Tramway. The largest expansions of the system were made by electrifying various existing steam lines of the New Haven and running trolleys over them, providing connections in 1906 from Middletown west to Meriden and north to Cromwell, connecting at the latter point with a new rural trolley line to Hartford, and a link between Norwich and Central Village. In 1907 an alternate line between East Hartford and Rockville was added to these operations. The segment from Middletown via Westfield to Berlin was also electrified for use by the Connecticut Company, but was later operated exclusively by the New Haven using larger passenger cars.

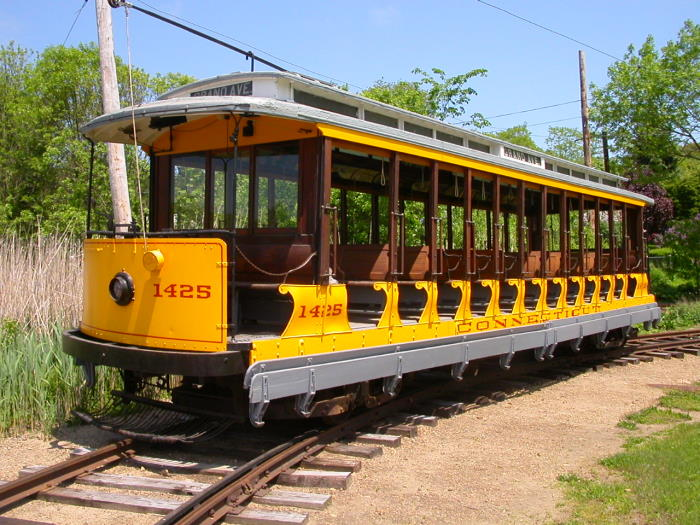
A Connecticut Company open streetcar, preserved at the Shore Line Trolley Museum

On February 28, 1910, the New Haven conveyed to the Connecticut Company almost all of the latter's operated trackage, with the exception of three short segments near the state lines: the former Suffield Street Railway from Suffield to Massachusetts (not connected to any other Connecticut lines), the portion of the former Worcester and Connecticut Eastern Railway from West Thompson to Massachusetts, and the portion of the former Greenwich Tramway from the Mianus River to New York. Except for the latter line, which was leased to New Haven subsidiary New York and Stamford Railway, the New Haven took over operation of these pieces, renting equipment, power, and labor from their Massachusetts connections, the Springfield Street Railway and Worcester Consolidated Street Railway. The purpose of retaining these lines was to keep the Connecticut Company an intrastate carrier, hopefully not subject to Interstate Commerce Commission jurisdiction. On June 13, 1913, the stock of the Connecticut Company was transferred from direct control by the New Haven to indirect control through subsidiary New England Navigation Company. Less than one month later, on July 7, the Shore Line Electric Railway, a rural trolley system operating between New Haven and Westerly, Rhode Island, leased the eastern Connecticut lines of the Connecticut Company, mainly comprising the New London-West Thompson line, including the right to operate over the New Haven's steam line between Norwich and Central Village.

=== Trusteeship and Bus Replacement ===
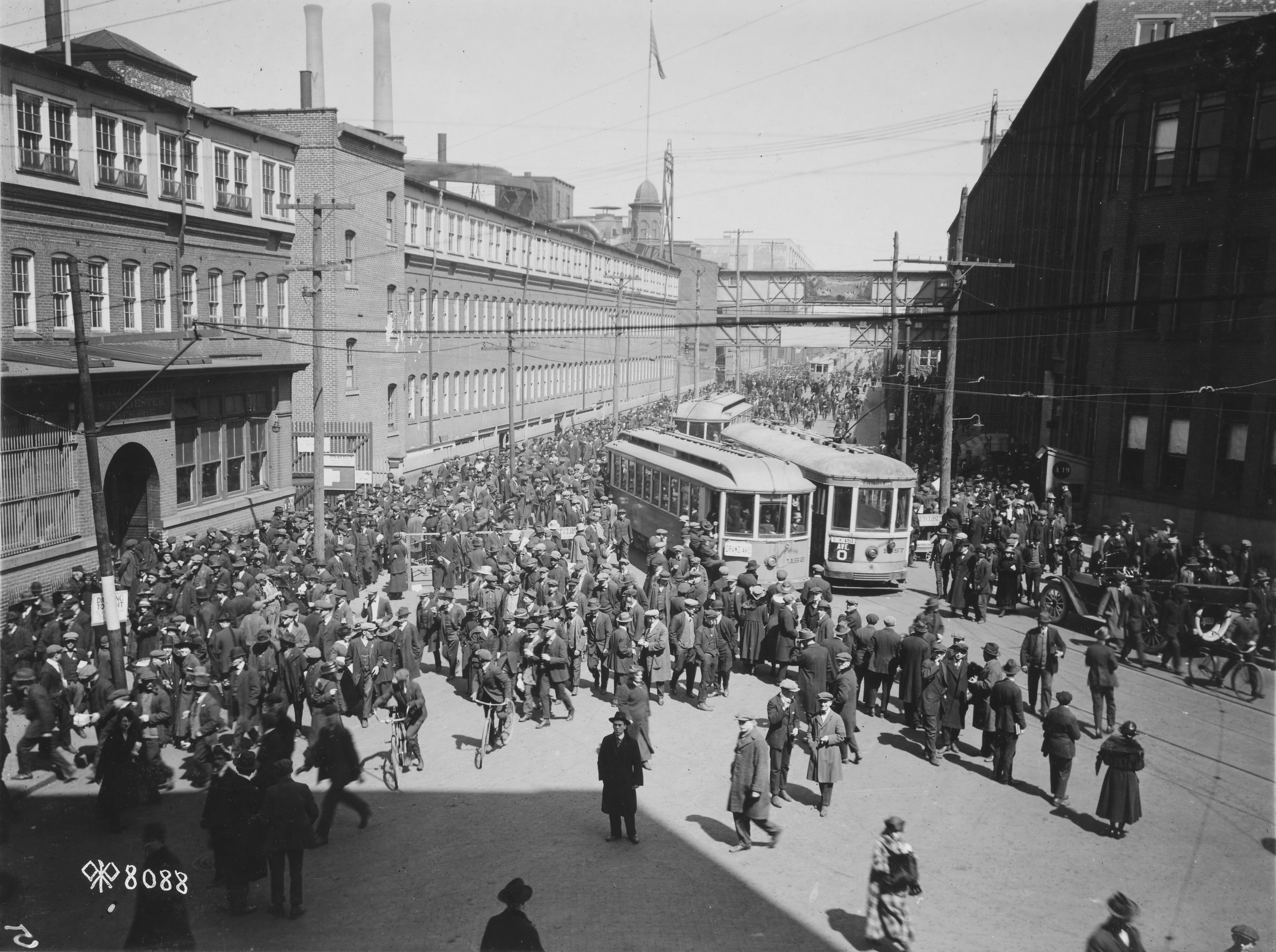
Connecticut Company trolleys in New Haven. Photo taken in April, 1918 at the intersection of Winchester Avenue and Munson Street.

In July 1914, the Attorney General of the United States filed suit against the New Haven, citing violations of the Sherman Antitrust Act in relation to its effective monopoly of steam and electric railways and water transportation in New England. Control of the electric railways in Massachusetts had already been transferred to the New England Investment and Security Company, a voluntary association created by the New Haven on June 25, 1906; the New Haven divested itself of this company in accordance with a May 1909 ruling of the Supreme Court of Massachusetts. The Connecticut Company and Rhode Island Company, each operating trolleys in their respective states, as well as the New Haven-controlled Boston and Maine Railroad, were, by decree of the District Court for the Southern District of New York, placed in the hands of voting trustees to separate them from the New Haven. The New Haven almost immediately sold its stock of the Boston and Maine, and its reorganization was completed in 1919. The Rhode Island Company was similarly reorganized into the United Electric Railways in 1921, losing its line into Connecticut in the process. But the New Haven was unable to find a purchaser for the Connecticut Company. Lucius Seymour Storrs, who had become vice president of the New Haven in 1912, took the presidency of the Connecticut Company in 1914 and remained there until his resignation in February 1925. The trusteeship was dissolved in December of that year, as judge Francis A. Winslow was convinced that there was little competition between the two companies, in part because of the lack of interest by others in purchasing the trolley lines, and the Connecticut Company was placed back under New Haven control.

During the trusteeship, the lease of the eastern Connecticut lines to the Shore Line Electric Railway was terminated on April 1, 1920. Just prior to the return to New Haven control, in early November 1925, the state authorized the system's first major abandonment and replacement with intercity buses, on the portion of this division north of Norwich. Abandonments progressed steadily through the 1920s and 1930s, with only city and suburban lines remaining after 1937. The Hartford Division was completely converted to buses on July 26, 1941, but trolleys continued to run on the streets of New Haven until September 25, 1948. The delay in conversion caused by World War II allowed the Branford Electric Railway Association to acquire, in 1947, a portion of the New Haven-Branford line that had been built on private right-of-way and create the Shore Line Trolley Museum.

Effective November 16, 1936, while the New Haven was in reorganization, the Connecticut Company terminated its lease of the Connecticut Railway and Lighting Company. That company's final trolley lines, mainly in the Bridgeport, Derby, and Waterbury areas, but also including joint intercity operations with the Connecticut Company, were replaced with buses in 1937. The Connecticut Company itself left New Haven control in June 1964, after defaulting on federal flood loans, and was reorganized under the same name and sold by the United States for $3,225,000. The old corporation, which still owned a portion of the old Glastonbury line, was renamed East Hartford Freight Company, and continued to operate non-electric freight service on Main Street in East Hartford to Pratt & Whitney until 1967.

In October 1972, the Connecticut Railway and Lighting Company, then operating buses in and near Bridgeport, Waterbury, and New Britain, ceased all service because of lack of money. The next month, Connecticut Company drivers and mechanics went on strike, and service, then concentrated on Stamford, New Haven, and Hartford, did not resume until the state began subsidizing it in March 1973 with federal assistance. Finally, in May 1976, the state purchased the Connecticut Company's property and began operating buses as Connecticut Transit. The Greater Bridgeport Transit Authority now serves Bridgeport, but Waterbury and New Britain operations have been taken over by Connecticut Transit.

== Operations ==
Despite having a connected network between cities, the Connecticut Company was not an interurban, and many intercity trips required changes of cars along the way. Most trackage was in or alongside public roads. By 1920, the system comprised 601.742 miles (968.410 km) of first main track in eleven divisions.

The New Haven Division included about fifteen local lines radiating from downtown New Haven. Intercity lines led east to East Haven and Stony Creek, north to Wallingford and Mount Carmel (towards Hartford and Waterbury), west to Derby, and southwest along the shore to Woodmont. Local lines connected Derby to Ansonia and Shelton, with intercity lines north to Beacon Falls (in the direction of Waterbury) and south towards Bridgeport. Bus service in the New Haven area is now operated by Connecticut Transit New Haven.

The Hartford Division was the largest, with about twenty local radial lines from downtown Hartford and half as many intercity lines. On the west side of the Connecticut River, trolleys went north and northwest to Rainbow Park, connecting at Windsor with the Hartford and Springfield Railway to Springfield, Massachusetts. Other lines went northwest to Bloomfield, west to Unionville, southwest to Newington (connecting there with the New Britain Division), and south to Wethersfield and Rocky Hill, connecting at the latter point with the Middletown Division. A single line crossed the Bulkeley Bridge into East Hartford, where lines radiated north to East Windsor Hill and another Hartford and Springfield Railway connection, east to Manchester and then northeast through Rockville to Stafford Springs, and south to South Glastonbury. Between East Hartford and Rockville, trolleys could follow public roads or use the New Haven's steam trackage. Connecticut Transit Hartford now operates buses on most of these routes.

About halfway between New Haven and Hartford was the Meriden Division, with seven radial lines in the city of Meriden. Extensions of these stretched south to Wallingford and a transfer to the New Haven Division, and west to Milldale and then north to Lake Compounce and the New Britain Division or south to Cheshire and the Waterbury Division. A third line east to Middletown over New Haven trackage was part of the Middletown Division, which comprised eight radial lines in and around that city, including service southwest to Middlefield, northeast over the Connecticut River to Portland, and north, partially over New Haven trackage, to Rocky Hill and the Hartford Division. Connecticut Transit Meriden has replaced the former division, but local bus service in Middletown is operated by Middletown Area Transit.

In the Waterbury Division were about ten routes radiating from downtown Waterbury. These included intercity lines south to Beacon Falls and the New Haven Division, west to Woodbury, northwest to Watertown, north to Thomaston, and east to Cheshire and then south to the New Haven Division at Mount Carmel. Connecticut Transit Waterbury has taken over these local routes.

The New Britain Division was between Meriden and Hartford, connecting with those divisions at Lazy Lane in Southington and at Newington. Six other radial lines were operated, one extending southeast to Berlin. Connecticut Transit New Britain now runs buses over most of these routes.

The isolated Torrington Division was a single line between Torrington and Winsted, with a branch to Highland Lake. It was abandoned in 1929.

Along the coast, near the New York state line, was the Stamford Division, with eight lines from downtown Stamford, two extending west and southwest into Greenwich and one east to the Noroton River. There the Norwalk Division began, extending through Darien to Norwalk, which had five radial lines coming off a loop between Norwalk and South Norwalk. The Bridgeport Division also entered Norwalk, extending east through Westport (with several local lines there) and Fairfield into Bridgeport. That city had about twelve radial lines, two running east into Stratford, where intercity lines continued north to the Derby Division in Shelton and east to the New Haven Division at Woodmont. Buses in these three divisions are currently operated by Connecticut Transit Stamford, the Norwalk Transit District, and the Greater Bridgeport Transit Authority.

Finally, the New London Division, which was leased to the Shore Line Electric Railway from 1913 to 1920, was not connected to the rest of the system except via that company's New Haven-New London line. Local lines in New London included several loops and radial lines south to Ocean Beach and northwest along Broad Street. A third line went north to Norwich, which had five more radial routes, one northwest to Yantic and another northeast to Taftville, where it split. One branch headed northwest through Willimantic to South Coventry, while the other entered New Haven trackage from Taftville to Central Village. A short branch headed east from Central Village to Moosup, while the main line continued north on its own tracks to West Thompson, with a branch from Elmville to East Killingly and a connection there with the Rhode Island Company's leased Providence and Danielson Railway. Where it exists, bus service here is now provided by Southeast Area Transit.
