= North East Transportation Company =

Bus operator in Connecticut, USA

North East Transportation Company Inc.

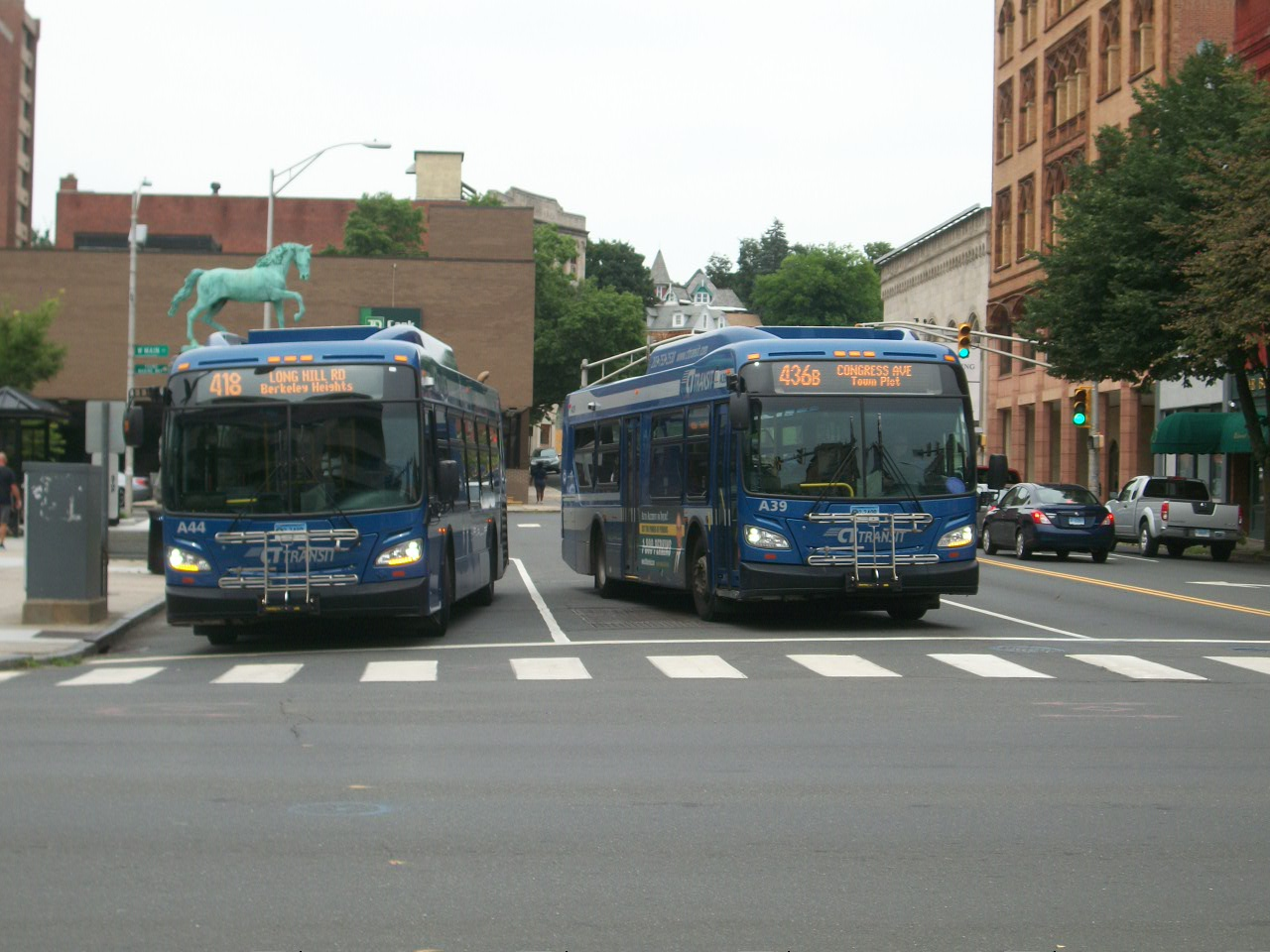
- CTtransit New Flyer XDE35 A44 and A39 in Downtown Waterbury
- Founded: October 1925
- Headquarters: 761 Frost Bridge Road, Watertown, Connecticut
- Locale: Connecticut
- Service area: Waterbury, Naugatuck, Torrington, Meriden, and Wallingford
- Service type: Local bus service; paratransit
- Alliance: CT Transit
- Chief executive: Barbara Kalosky
- Website: northeastbus.com

The North East Transportation Company (abbreviated as NET, sometimes written as Northeast Transportation) is a bus operator based in the Naugatuck Valley area of Connecticut. NET currently serves as a contractor under CT Transit providing local bus and paratransit services in Meriden, Wallingford, and Waterbury. Despite being part of the CT Transit system, these cities' routes are fully operated by North East Transportation and are overseen by local transit authorities.

== History ==
The North East Transportation Company was founded in October 1925 as a merger of multiple existing jitney operators in Waterbury

After CR&L's surrender of its bus operations in 1973, North East Transportation existed as the only bus operator in its service area. NET's routes were overseen by the Connecticut Department of Transportation, although it was not until the 1990s that they began to use CT Transit buses, or the early-2000s when their services formally became part of the CT Transit system.

Having previously operated out of a former brass manufactory in Waterbury for 36 years, NET moved to a new facility in Watertown in 2019. The new facility was constructed by STV Inc. and took the place of a former drive-in theater.

== Waterbury, Meriden and Wallingford Operations ==
Since the integration of the CTDOT's Waterbury, Meriden, and Wallingford bus services into the CT Transit system in 2008, NET has operated these routes as part of the eponymous CT Transit Waterbury, Meriden and Wallingford Division.

=== Meriden ===
In 1980, NET took over operation of Meriden's bus routes from State of Connecticut using equipment leased from New Britain Transportation. The municipal Meriden Transit District oversees NET's operations in the city, although its routes always have been managed by the CTDOT.

=== Wallingford ===
After North East Transportation took over Meriden's bus routes in 1980 it began its first public bus service to Wallingford.

=== Waterbury ===
Waterbury was the original home of North East Transportation, and it was the agency contracted by the Greater Waterbury Transit District (GWTD) in 1985, including for its paratransit ACCESS program.

== See also ==
- CT Transit New Britain & Bristol
- Greater Bridgeport Transit Authority
- Northwestern Connecticut Transit District
