= Highland Lake (Winchester, Connecticut) =

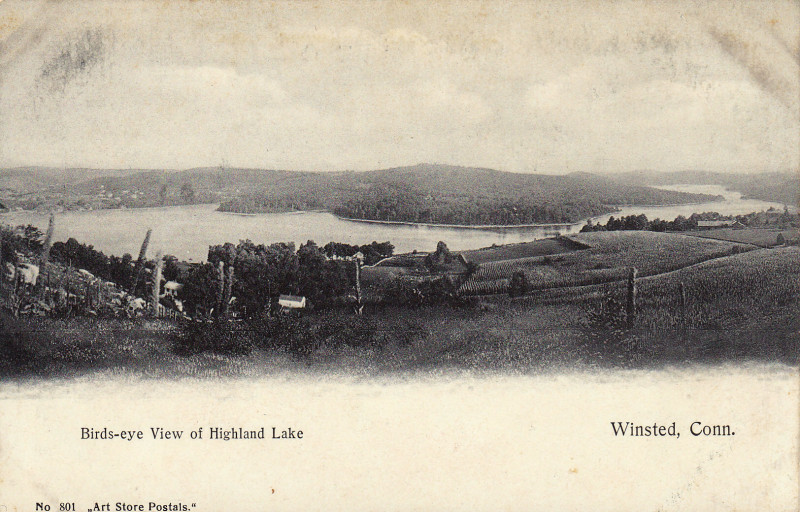

- Location within Connecticut Location within the United States
- Location: Winchester, Connecticut, United States
- Coordinates: 41°54′01″N 73°05′32″W
- Type: Reservoir
- Max. length: 3 miles (4.8 km)
- Max. width: 0.5 miles (0.80 km)
- Surface area: 445 acres (180 ha)
- Max. depth: 63 ft (19 m)
- Surface elevation: 886 ft (270 m)

Highland Lake is a body of water located within the boundaries of Winchester, Connecticut. It has a surface area of 445 acres (180 ha) and an average depth of 24 feet (7.3 m). The lake is long but not wide, extending approximately three miles (4.8 km) from north to south but only one-half mile (0.80 km) at its widest. It narrows at two points and therefore divides into three distinct sections, known (from north to south) as First Bay, Second Bay, and Third Bay. Highland Lake achieves its maximum depth of 63 feet (19 m) toward the center of Second Bay.

The lake is used for boating and fishing. The Connecticut Department of Environmental Protection stocks the lake annually with fish, and considers it a Trophy Trout and Bass Management Lake.

Highland Lake is encircled by Wakefield Boulevard, which is a little over seven miles (11 km) long.
