= Connecticut Railway and Lighting Company =

Streetcar and bus transit operator

Overview
- Reporting mark: CRL
- Locale: Bridgeport, Connecticut
- Dates of operation: 1901–1972
- Successor: Greater Bridgeport Transit District in 1975 (now called Greater Bridgeport Transit Authority)

Technical
- Track gauge: 4 ft 8 1/2 in (1,435 mm)
- Electrification: 600v DC

Connecticut Railway and Lighting Company was a streetcar and bus transit operator serving the region around Bridgeport, Norwalk, Derby, New Britain and Waterbury, Connecticut. It was formed in 1901 by United Gas Improvement Company of Philadelphia to manage the streetcar operations of the Connecticut Light and Power Company, which at the time included Central Railway and Electric Company, Norwalk Street Railway, and the Waterbury Traction Company. The newly formed Connecticut Railway and Lighting acquired Bridgeport Traction Company, Derby Street Railway, Milford Street Railway, Shelton Street Railway, Meriden, Southington and Compounce Tramway Company, and the Cheshire Street Railway. Connecticut Railway and Lighting was leased to the Consolidated Railway and in turn the Connecticut Company between 1906 and 1936. Streetcar operations were discontinued in 1937 when all lines were converted to bus. Transit operations continued until 1972, when all remaining bus operations were suspended and taken over by Connecticut Transit, except in Bridgeport- by the Greater Bridgeport Transit District in 1975.

== Early history (1895–1906) ==
Founded in 1895 was the Gas Supply Company, it was authorized by legislature to manufacture and distribute gas fuel throughout Fairfield County, Connecticut. The name of the Gas Supply Company was changed in 1899 to Connecticut Lighting and Power Company, and its authority expanded to generating and distributing electricity. In 1901, the name was changed to Connecticut Railway and Lighting Company. A number of streetcar and electric utility companies were acquired during the intervening years, building up a large system in the Naugatuck Valley and surrounding region. All of the property controlled by CR&L was leased to the Consolidated Railway in 1906, which in turn was leased to the Connecticut Company.

== Connecticut Company control (1906–1936) ==
In 1906 the CR&L streetcar lines were leased to the Connecticut Company, a subsidiary of the New York, New Haven and Hartford Railroad created to control and operate the majority of electric trolley lines across the state. When the New Haven entered receivership, the Connecticut Company leases were cancelled in 1936 for lack of payment.

== CR&L Lines (1936–1972) ==
Connecticut Railway and Lighting Company resumed independent operation of its lines in 1936, but worked quickly to convert the remaining streetcar lines to bus operation by 1937. Stockholders wished to get out of the transit business, and so those operations were sold off in 1943. A number of under-performing bus routes were discontinued over the years until all service was suspended in 1972. The transit franchises were succeeded by Connecticut Transit, except in Bridgeport by the Greater Bridgeport Transportation Authority after its formation in 1975. Between 1972 and 1975, remaining local bus routes in Bridgeport were taken over fully or in part by CR&L's competing smaller bus companies: Gray Line, Chestnut Hill, Bridgeport Auto Transit, and Stratford Bus Line. A former Milford CT school and charter bus company- Cross Country Coach, purchased a few of CR & L's older buses to operate a regional route between Norwalk, Bridgeport, and New Haven. This was a restoration of two former CR & L routes, which commenced in 1973 and continued until Cross Country Coach ceased operations in the early 1980s.

== See also ==
- Connecticut Railway and Lighting Company Car Barn
- Connecticut Railway and Lighting Company on Metro-Wiki
- Former Bridgeport CT Bus Companies on Metro-Wiki

=== List of affiliated and controlled companies ===
- Norwalk, Bridgeport and Bethel Traction Company
- Thomaston and Watertown Electric Railway Company
- Naugatuck Valley Electric Railway Company
- Cheshire Street Railway Company
- Greenwich Gas and Electric Lighting Company
- Norwalk Gas Light Company
- Norwalk and South Norwalk Electric Light Company
- Naugatuck Electric Light Company
- Southington and Plantsville Tramway Company
- Waterbury Traction Company
- Norwalk Street Railway Company
- Central Railway and Lighting Company
- Norwalk Tramway Company
- Westport and Saugatuck Street Railway Company
- Milford Street Railway Company
- Bridgeport Traction Company
- Derby Street Railway Company
- Shelton Street Railway Company
- Norwalk, Bridgeport and Bethel Traction Company
