= Greater Bridgeport Transit Authority =

Public transit authority in Greater Bridgeport, Connecticut

Greater Bridgeport Transit

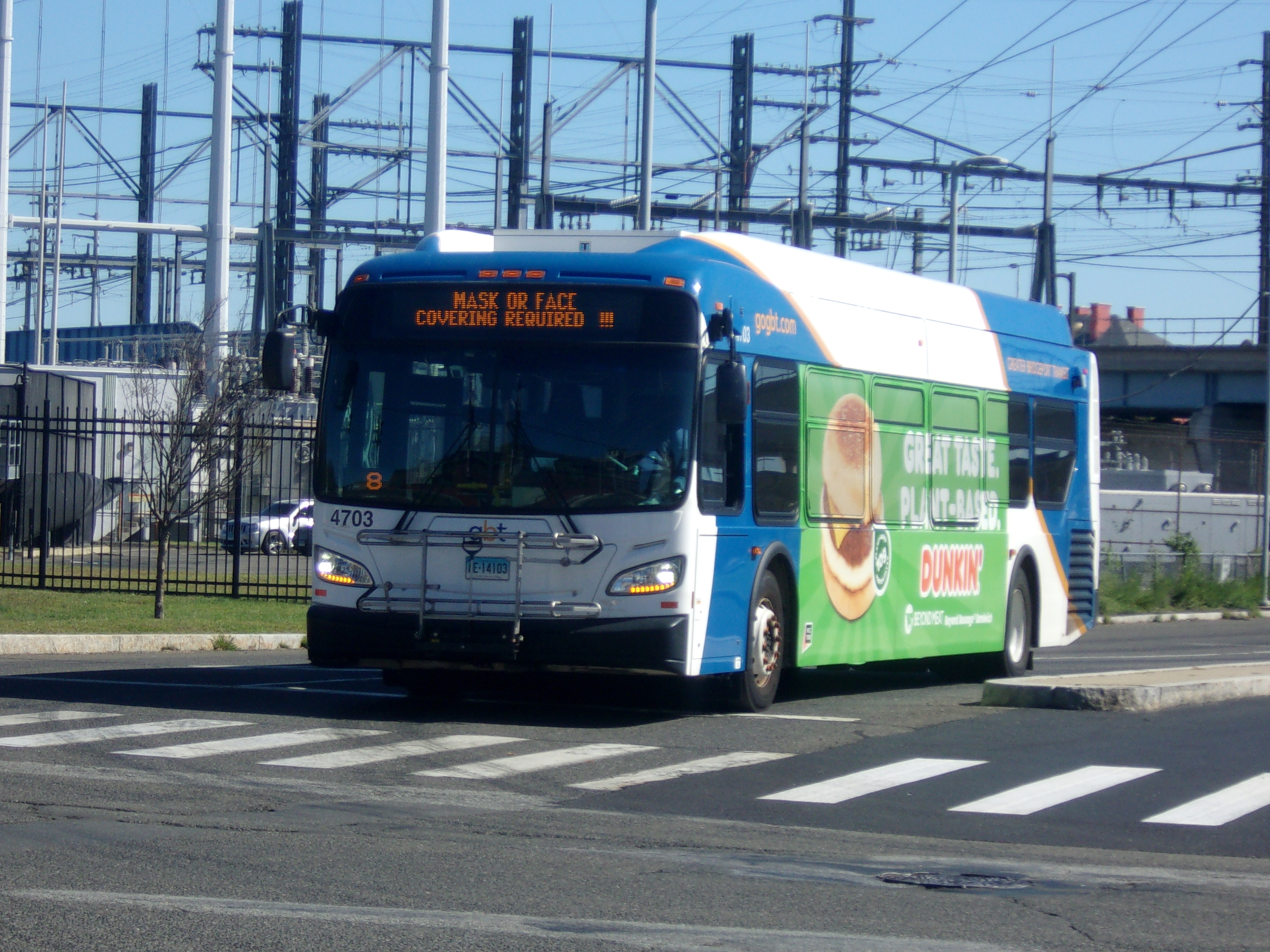
- A 2017 GBT NFI XD40 bus outside the Bridgeport Transportation Center
- Parent: Greater Bridgeport Transit
- Founded: 1971
- Headquarters: 1 Cross Street; Bridgeport, CT 06610
- Locale: Greater Bridgeport
- Service area: Greater Bridgeport
- Service type: Local and regional bus service
- Routes: 16 (Routes 7, 9B, 19, 22X, and 23 operate Monday-Friday; Route 17 operate Monday-Saturday; remaining routes operate 7 days a week) (one in conjunction with Norwalk Transit District and Milford Transit District)
- Hubs: Bridgeport Bus Terminal
- Fleet: 57 (With four 2003 New Flyer D40LF & three New Flyer D35LF from retired fleet used for spares/training)
- Daily ridership: 22,100
- Fuel type: Diesel/Diesel Electric/Battery Electric
- Operator: Greater Bridgeport Transit
- Chief executive: Douglas C. Holcomb, AICP
- Website: Greater Bridgeport Transit

Greater Bridgeport Transit (GBT) is a transit service serving the Greater Bridgeport region of the U.S. state of Connecticut. Greater Bridgeport Transit was established in 1971 in anticipation of diminished bus service by the Connecticut Company, which officially ceased operations in Bridgeport in 1972. GBT provides local bus service to the cities/towns of Bridgeport, Trumbull, Stratford, Milford, Fairfield, Westport, Shelton, and Monroe. The fleet is composed of mainly New Flyer Xcelsior and New Flyer Low Floor, as well as Gillig Low Floor, three Proterra ZX5 models, and two Proterra Catalyst BE40 models, which have since been pulled from regular service for "unknown reasons".

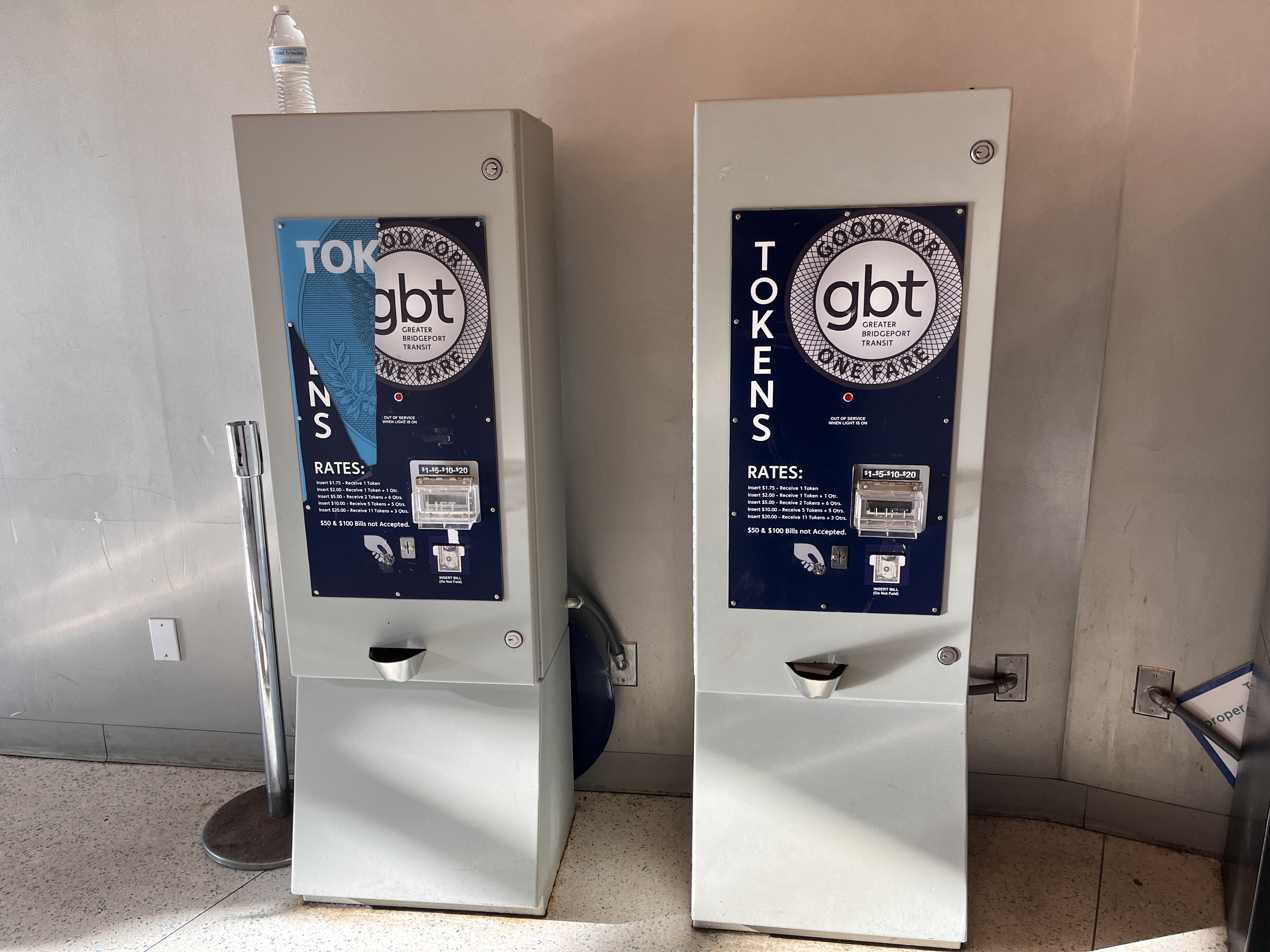
GBT's token machines, located inside the Bridgeport Transportation Center

GBT uses a system called ZipTrip for fare collection. This acts as any other pass or transfer would, permitting free, unlimited rides in any direction until expiration. It was first introduced in 2007, before which payment was made in cash or tokens. The token vending machines at the bus station have since been rendered inoperable.

== Routes and Schedules ==
- 1 University of Bridgeport/Seaside Park to Dock Shopping Center (Stratford) via Barnum Avenue (US 1) Monday-Sunday
- 3 Bridgeport Intermodal Transportation Center to Westfield Trumbull Mall (Trumbull) via Madison Avenue Monday-Sunday
- 4 Bridgeport Intermodal Transportation Center to Westfield Trumbull Mall (Trumbull) via Park Avenue Monday-Sunday
- 5 Bridgeport Intermodal Transportation Center to Wordin Park (Black Rock) via Fairfield Avenue/Commerce Drive Monday-Sunday
- 6 Bridgeport Intermodal Transportation Center to Westfield Trumbull Mall (Trumbull) via Noble Avenue/Reservoir Avenue/Old Town Road Monday-Sunday
- 7 Bridgeport Intermodal Transportation Center to Carolton Hospital (Fairfield) via Commerce Drive Monday-Friday
- 8 Bridgeport Intermodal Transportation Center to Westfield Trumbull Mall (Trumbull) via Main Street Monday-Sunday
- 9 Seaside Park to Hawley Lane Mall (Nichols) or Quarry Road (Trumbull) via East Main Street and Iranistan Avenue Monday-Sunday
- 10 Fairfield Woods & Stillson Roads (Fairfield) to Stratford & Beardsley Avenues via Hollister Avenue and Black Rock Turnpike Monday-Sunday
- 13 Bridgeport Intermodal Transportation Center to Success Park via Central Avenue Monday-Sunday
- 15 Bridgeport Intermodal Transportation Center to Hawley Lane Mall & Derby Metro-North Station (Derby) via Broadridge Avenue, Route 108, & Bridgeport Avenue SR 714. Monday-Sunday
- 17 Bridgeport Intermodal Transportation Center to Success Park via Boston Avenue/North Avenue (US 1) Monday-Saturday
- 19 (Formerly 19x) Bridgeport Intermodal Transportation Center to Stop & Shop (Monroe) via Route 25 and SR 111 (Final outbound trip 5:43 P.M.) Monday-Friday
- 22x Bridgeport Intermodal Transportation Center to Bridgeport Avenue and Commerce Drive (Shelton) via Route 8 & SR 714 (Final outbound trip 5:45 P.M.) Monday-Friday
- 23 Bridgeport Intermodal Transportation Center to Derby Metro-North Station (Derby) via Main Street/River Road (Route 110) (Final outbound trip 7:10 P.M.) Monday-Friday
- Coastal Link Norwalk WHEELS Hub (Norwalk) to Connecticut Post Mall (Milford) Monday-Sunday

== Coastal Link ==
GBT also partially maintains bus service on the Coastal Link (formerly Route 2) seven days a week. providing service from the Connecticut Post Mall in Milford, Connecticut to the Bridgeport bus station in Bridgeport, Connecticut which also connects to rail service at the Bridgeport station (Connecticut) for the New Haven Line and from there on to the Wheels Hub in Norwalk, Connecticut. The service runs in conjunction with Milford Transit District and Norwalk Transit District using their buses as well. Frequency is roughly every 30 minutes.

== Fares and passes ==
- ZipTrip 120-Minute

$1.75

- ZipTrip 1-Day Unlimited

$4.00

- ZipTrip 7-Day Unlimited

$17.50

- ZipTrip 31-Day Unlimited

$70.00

- ZipTrip Half-Fare

Seniors, persons with disabilities, and holders of a Medicare card pay half fare all the time with proper ID.

- ZipTrip Youth Pass

Use the GBT Bus System weekdays for a 31-day period for $45 with proper ID. Must be 17 years of age or younger.

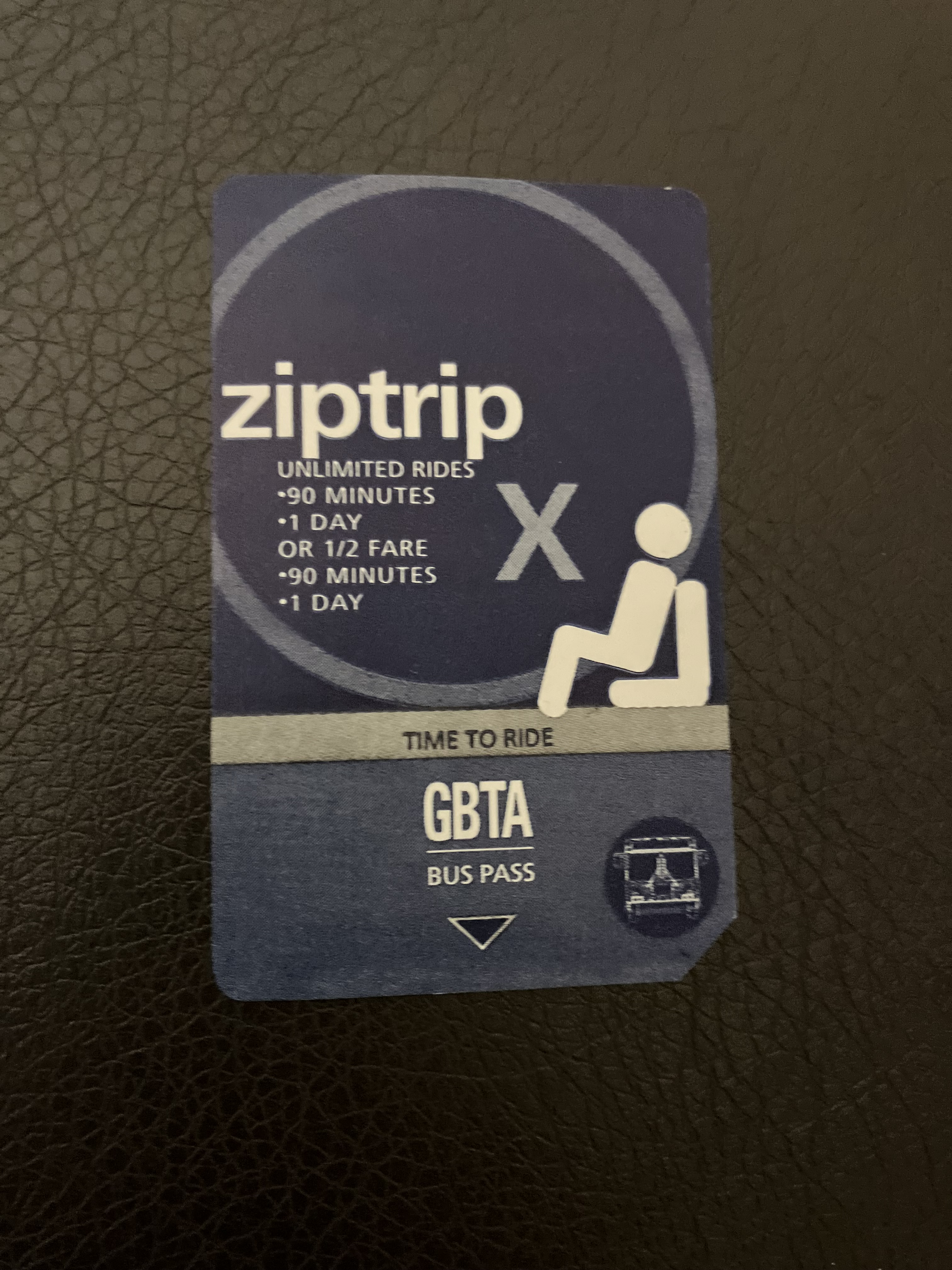
a ZipTrip ticket dispensed by a GBT bus.
