= List of nature centers in Connecticut =

Connecticut Nature Centers (Hover mouse over pog to popup clickable link)

This is a list of nature centers and environmental education centers in the state of Connecticut.

To use the sortable tables: click on the icons at the top of each column to sort that column in alphabetical order; click again for reverse alphabetical order.

| Name | Location | County | Summary |
|---|---|---|---|
| Ansonia Nature and Recreation Center | Ansonia | New Haven | website, town owned and operated 150-acre park and nature center |
| Audubon Center at Bent of the River | Southbury | New Haven | Part of the National Audubon Society, 700 acres with 15 miles of trails |
| Audubon Greenwich | Greenwich | Fairfield | website, part of the National Audubon Society, main sanctuary is 285 acres with 7 miles of trails |
| Barnard Nature Center at West River Memorial Park | New Haven | New Haven | website, operated by the City, partnership with the Barnard Environmental Magnet School across the street, focus is the West River |
| Barnes Nature Center | Bristol | Hartford | website, operated by the Environmental Learning Centers of Connecticut |
| Bartlett Arboretum and Gardens | Stamford | Fairfield | Contains 91 acres (37 hectares) of parkland, gardens, landscapes and hiking trails |
| Bauer Park | Madison | New Haven | website, 65 acre park and former farm |
| Brookfield Nature Center | Brookfield | Fairfield | website, 16 acre park and former farm with walking trails and brook |
| Bushy Hill Nature Center | Essex | Middlesex | website, over 700 acres |
| Chatfield Hollow State Park | Killingworth | Middlesex | 356 acres, Oak Lodge Nature Center open seasonally |
| Connecticut Audubon Society Birdcraft Museum and Sanctuary | Fairfield | Fairfield | Operated by Connecticut Audubon, 6 acres, natural history museum |
| Connecticut Audubon Society Center at Fairfield | Fairfield | Fairfield | Operated by Connecticut Audubon, 152 acres with 7 miles of trails |
| Connecticut Audubon Society Center at Glastonbury | Glastonbury | Hartford | Adjacent to the 48-acre town-owned Earle Park, focus is Connecticut River ecosystem |
| Connecticut Audubon Society Coastal Center at Milford Point | Milford | New Haven | Operated by Connecticut Audubon, located on an 8.4-acre (34,000 m2) barrier beach and situated next to the 840-acre Charles E. Wheeler Wildlife Management Area |
| Connecticut Audubon Society Center at Pomfret | Pomfret | Windham | Adjacent 702-acre Bafflin Sanctuary, also hosts art exhibits |
| Connecticut Audubon Society Center at Trail Wood | Hampton | Windham | 168 acres, former home of author Edwin Way Teale |
| Darien Nature Center | Darien | Fairfield | website, located in 26-acre Cherry Lawn Park |
| Denison Pequotsepos Nature Center | Mystic | New London | website, maintains 77 acres with 8 miles of trails from the Denison Homestead |
| Earthplace | Westport | Fairfield | 62 acre sanctuary with 2 miles of trails, natural history museum |
| Eleanor Buck Wolf Nature Center | Wethersfield | Hartford | website, operated by the Town |
| Flanders Nature Center & Land Trust | Woodbury | Litchfield | Protects 2,000 acres of open space in several towns including seven nature preserves and sanctuaries |
| Goodwin Forest Conservation Education Center | Hampton | Windham | Operated by the CT DEEP in the 2000-acre James L. Goodwin State Forest |
| Henry Hamel Environmental Center | Seymour | New Haven | website, operated by the Seymour Land Trust |
| Highstead Arboretum | West Redding | Fairfield | Over 100 acres and 2 miles of trails, open to members |
| Hungerford Nature Center | Berlin | Hartford | website, a demonstration farm, exotic animals, trails, and science exhibits; operated by the New Britain Youth Museum |
| Kellogg Environmental Center | Derby | New Haven | website, operated by the CT DEEP, offers workshops, exhibits, nature activities, and lectures for the general public |
| Meigs Point Nature Center | Madison | New Haven | Located at Hammonasset Beach State Park, open year-round |
| New Canaan Nature Center | New Canaan | Fairfield | 40 acres |
| New Pond Farm | Redding | Fairfield | website, 102 acres with small working farm |
| Northwest Park Nature Center | Windsor | Hartford | 473 acres, features natural history, geology and meteorology exhibits, adjacent barn with farm animals |
| Platt Nature Center | Killingworth | Middlesex | website, 9 acres |
| Pratt Nature Center | New Milford | Litchfield | website, 201 acres |
| Oak Grove Nature Center | Manchester | Hartford | 52 acres, open for programs by the Lutz Children's Museum |
| Old Quarry Nature Center | Danbury | Fairfield | 80 acres |
| Riverbound Farm | Cheshire | New Haven | Quinnipiac Valley Audubon Society, 23 acres, center open once a month |
| Roaring Brook Nature Center | Canton | Hartford | website, adjacent to the 165-acre Werner's Woods state preserve, affiliated with The Children's Museum, Connecticut |
| Rocky Neck State Park | East Lyme | New London | 710 acre park and beach, small nature center open seasonally |
| Sessions Woods Wildlife Management Area | Burlington | Hartford | 771-acre state preserve, conservation education programs |
| Sharon Audubon Center | Sharon | Litchfield | 1,200 acres, includes a raptor aviary, herb garden, bird and butterfly garden, and a sugarhouse |
| Sherwood Island State Park Nature Center | Westport | Fairfield | Open seasonally, 234-acre park and beach, tidal wetlands on Long Island Sound |
| Shoreline Outdoor Education Center | North Guilford | New Haven | website, located on 6 acres of town property |
| Soundwaters | Stamford | Fairfield | website, education about Long Island Sound, located in Cove Island Park |
| Stamford Museum and Nature Center | Stamford | Fairfield | 118 acres, art, history and nature museum, 10 acre working farm; trails connect to the Bartlett Arboretum |
| Stratton Brook State Park | Simsbury | Hartford | Nature center is open seasonally |
| Trumbull Nature & Arts Center | Trumbull | Fairfield | website |
| Webb Mountain Discovery Zone | Monroe | Fairfield | 171 acres, outdoor learning center, owned by the town |
| Westmoor Park | West Hartford | Hartford | 162 acres, self-funded, features demonstration farm |
| West Rock Nature Center | New Haven | New Haven | website, operated by the City, 43 acres on West Rock Ridge |
| White Memorial Conservation Center | Litchfield | Litchfield | 4,000 acre-preserve, nature museum |
| Woodcock Nature Center | Wilton | Fairfield | website 149 acres with 5 miles of trails including boardwalks and viewing platforms, preserve and trails open to the public year-round, self-funded, public programs, and summer camps |

== Resources ==
- Connecticut Outdoor and Environmental Education Association
