= Milford Point =

Beach in Connecticut, United States

- Beach
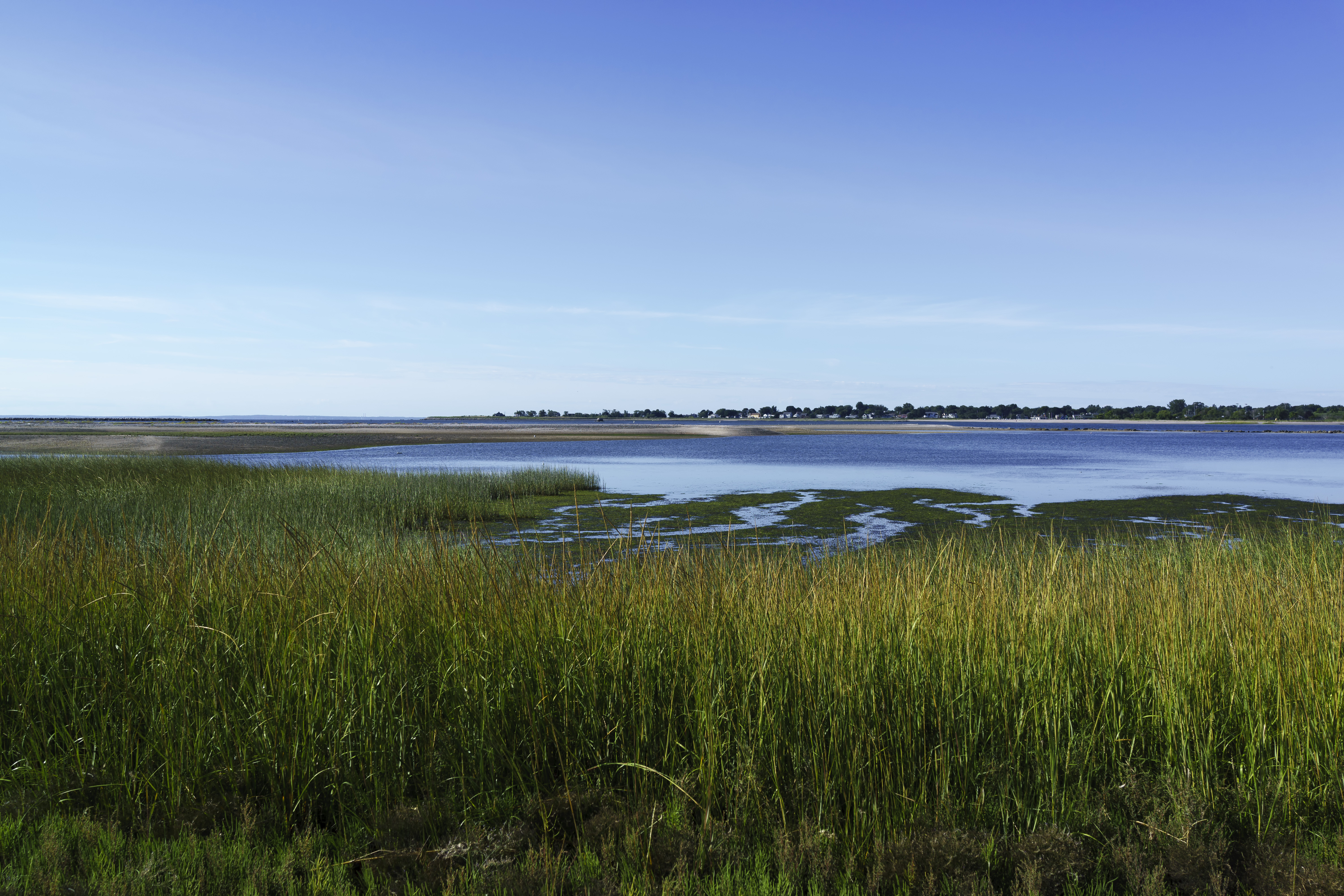
- Milford Point viewed from the Housatonic River

- Coordinates: 41°10′22.35″N 73°6′34.39″W
- Location: Milford, Connecticut
- Elevation: 1 m (3.3 ft)

Milford Point is a 23-acre (0.093 km^{2}) barrier beach on the shoreline of Milford, Connecticut. The long peninsula is the southwest extremity of the city, located at the mouth of the Housatonic River on Long Island Sound.

A sandspit landform, the Point serves as a fortress, protecting the Charles Wheeler Salt Marsh (WMA), a tidal wetland and habitat to 315 different species of waterfowl, shorebirds, and waders. Milford Point is considered one of Connecticut's top birdwatching destinations, as the environment provides foraging and resting areas for tens of thousands of shorebirds each year, making it one of the most essential migration stopover areas on the Sound.

Ownership of Milford Point is divided between the U.S. Fish and Wildlife Service and the State Department of Environmental Protection. Additionally, the Connecticut Audubon Society leases a portion of land from the state, which is used as a bird sanctuary and educational facility called the Audubon Coastal Center at Milford Point.

Milford Point is also one of ten land units that make up the Stewart B. McKinney Wildlife Refuge.

== History ==
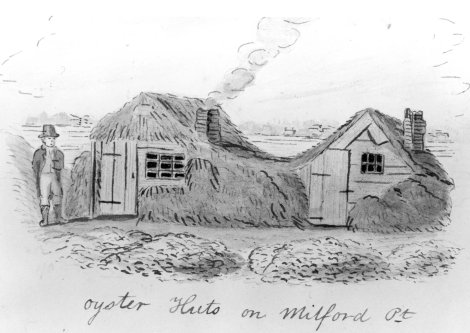
Oyster Huts on Milford Point a sketch by John Warner Barber (1836).

Prior to colonization, this area was the site of a Native American village called Poconock. By 1752, it was a destination for fishing and oystering, in which oystermen would spend their winters living in small huts covered in seaweed.

Eventually, Milford Point would become a place for leisure. The Milford Point Hotel (originally called the Smith Hotel and later the Ford Hotel), was particularly notable. Known for its excellent shore dinners, it is said to have hosted nearly all of the prominent men of Connecticut. The hotel and property was given to the state of Connecticut in the 1930s, and it became a Coast Guard reconnaissance center during WWII. The Connecticut Audubon Society began leasing the site in 1995 and repurposed the former hotel into a visitor center for their Coastal Center.
