= Milford Point Hotel =

- U.S. National Register of Historic Places
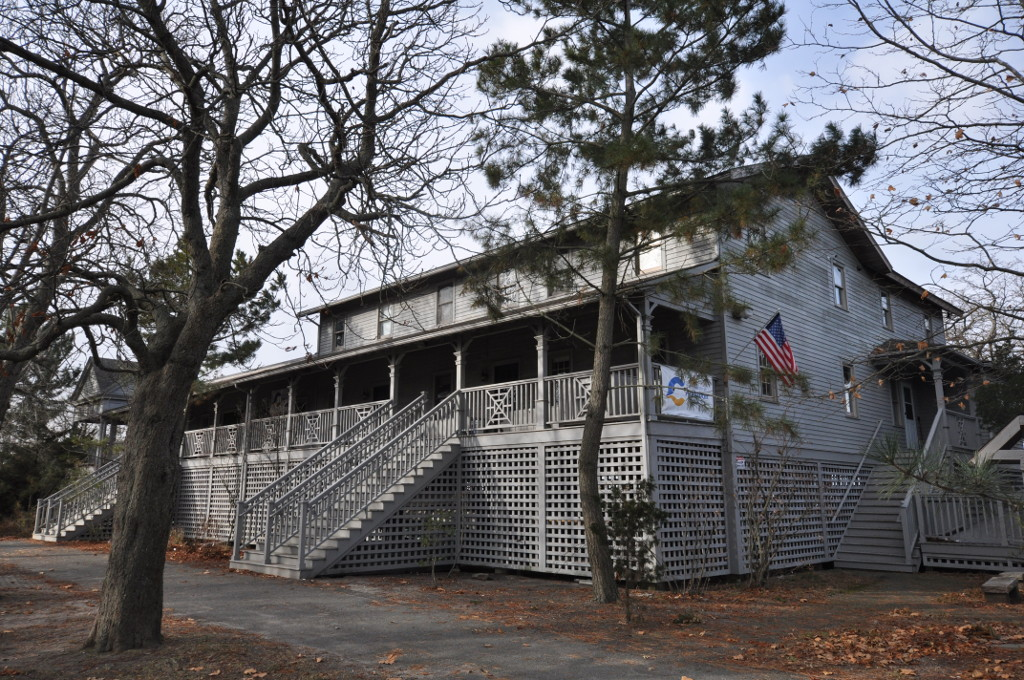

- Location within Connecticut Location within the United States
- Location: 1 Milford Point Road, Milford, Connecticut
- Coordinates: 41°10′33″N 73°6′7″W
- Area: 3 acres (1.2 ha)
- Built: 1847
- Architectural style: Italianate
- NRHP reference No.: 87002417
- Added to NRHP: January 22, 1988

The Milford Point Hotel is a former hotel building at 1 Milford Point Road in Milford, Connecticut. Built in 1847, it is one of the oldest surviving seaside coastal hotel buildings in the state. It was listed on the National Register of Historic Places in 1988. It now serves as the visitors center for the Connecticut Audubon Society Coastal Center at Milford Point.

== Description and history ==
The former Milford Point Hotel is located near the tip of Milford Point, the most southwesterly part of the city. The point forms the eastern edge of the mouth of the Housatonic River, and is an area of conservation and wildlife management lands owned by the state and the Connecticut Audubon Society. The hotel building is a 2-1/2 story wood frame structure, with a gabled roof and clapboarded exterior, set on a raised foundation obscured by latticework. A single-story shed-roofed porch extends across the front, with Italianate square posts rising to jigsawn brackets. The interior retains much of its original layout, with three main public chambers on the first floor, and a corridor providing access to small guest rooms on the second.

The hotel was built in 1847 by George T. Smith, and provided a seaside vacation experience to travelers arriving on the recently completed railroad which ran along the coast. This type of small boarding house was once a common sight on Connecticut's coast, but is now rarely seen. Its current setting, well back from the shoreline of Long Island Sound, is the result of natural sand deposition. Its Italianate features are probably the result of a major update of the property that took place in 1875. In the 1930s, the hotel and surround land were given to the state, which formed the wildlife management and nature preserve areas where it now stands. In World War II, the building was used as a military lookout station. It now houses the visitors center of the Connecticut Audubon Society's Coastal Center at Milford Point.

== See also ==
- National Register of Historic Places listings in New Haven County, Connecticut
