= Duck Island (Milford, Connecticut) =

Island in New Haven County, Connecticut, United States

Coordinates: 41.1744°N 73.1084°W

Duck Island is the one of two islands in the Charles E. Wheeler Wildlife Management Area at the mouth of the Housatonic River. It is approximately 100 feet (30 m) from the end of Milford Point Road, near the Connecticut Audubon Society Coastal Center at Milford Point. The island is uninhabited and is designated as a Department of Environmental Protection Natural Area Preserve, though people may visit the island outside of bird nesting season. The maximum elevation on the island is ~16 feet (4.9 m).

The island is within the boundaries of the City of Milford, Connecticut and is owned and managed by State of Connecticut.

== Transportation ==
All transportation to and from the island is by boat.
