= Harriet Risley Foote =

American rosarian and educator

Harriet Risley Foote in 1886

Harriet Risley Foote (1863-1951) was an American rosarian and educator. She designed numerous rose gardens for the wealthy Gilded Age elite, including Henry Ford and Arthur Curtiss James, and Annie Burr Jennings.

== Biography ==
Harriet Risley Foote was born in Waterville, New York in 1863. She attended Waterville Academy as a teenager and then enrolled in Smith College in 1882. After graduation in 1886, she worked as a teacher of chemistry and physics at Holyoke High School. She married the rector of Holyoke Episcopal Church, Reverend Henry Lewis Foote, in 1891. In 1895, the couple moved to the coastal town of Marblehead, Massachusetts. Henry became the rector of St. Michael’s Church in Marblehead.

== Rosarian ==
In 1895, Harriet Risley Foote began growing roses at the rectory garden of St. Michael’s Church in Marblehead, Massachusetts. She wrote to rose nurseries in Europe to import many rose varieties that had not yet been brought over to the United States. It’s reported that her rectory garden had over 250 varieties of roses and 650 individual plants at its peak. In 1906, the couple moved to a new home at the corner of Devereux and Beach Streets in Marblehead where Harriet began a new large scale rose garden. Henry died in 1918 and, after becoming a widow, Harriet purchased neighboring lots and expanded the rose garden at her home. At its peak, it consisted of four acres.

Several articles in House Beautiful were written about Harriet Risley Foote and her rose garden in the 1920s. In 1948, she published Mrs. Foote’s Rose Book, a practical guide to cultivating roses where she shared her methods. Some of these methods are unconventional in rose cultivation circles. She won several awards throughout her career, including a Massachusetts Horticultural Society gold medal in 1923 for a rose garden she designed at The Cedars, a special award for horticultural achievement from the National Council of State Garden Clubs in 1945, and a gold medal from the American Rose Society in 1933.

In addition to her own garden in Marblehead, Harriet Risley Foote was commissioned to design and supply the roses for several private residences. She collaborated with well known landscape architects including Herbert Kellaway, Arthur Shurtleff, and the Olmsted Brothers firm.

== Projects ==
- Rose garden at Castle Hill, the estate of Richard and Florence Crane in Ipswich, Massachusetts, ca. 1910.
- Rose garden at Beacon Hill House, the residence of Arthur Curtiss James in Newport, Rhode Island, ca. 1914.
- Rose garden at Sunnie-holme, the residence of Annie Burr Jennings in Fairfield, Connecticut, ca. 1916.
- Rose garden at The Cedars, the summer home of Henry Sargent Hunnewell in Wellesley, Massachusetts, ca. 1923.
- Rose garden at Fair Lane, the estate of Henry Ford and Clara Bryant Ford in Dearborn, Michigan, 1926.
- National Rose Museum, Virginia, 1934 (not realized).
