= Nells Island =

Island in New Haven County, Connecticut, United States

Coordinates: 41.184819°N 73.11622°W

Nells Island is the larger of two islands in the Charles E. Wheeler Wildlife Management Area at the mouth of the Housatonic River. It is directly across the river from the American Shakespeare Theatre in Stratford, Connecticut. The island is uninhabited but is designated as a "miscellaneous open space" by the City of Milford. It is about 3 feet (0.91 m) above sea level.

The island is within the boundaries of the City of Milford, Connecticut and is owned and managed by the State of Connecticut.

== Transportation ==
All transportation to and from the island is by boat.

== Internal links ==
Charles E. Wheeler Wildlife Management Area
