= Sharon Audubon Center =

Wildlife sanctuary in Sharon, Connecticut, United States

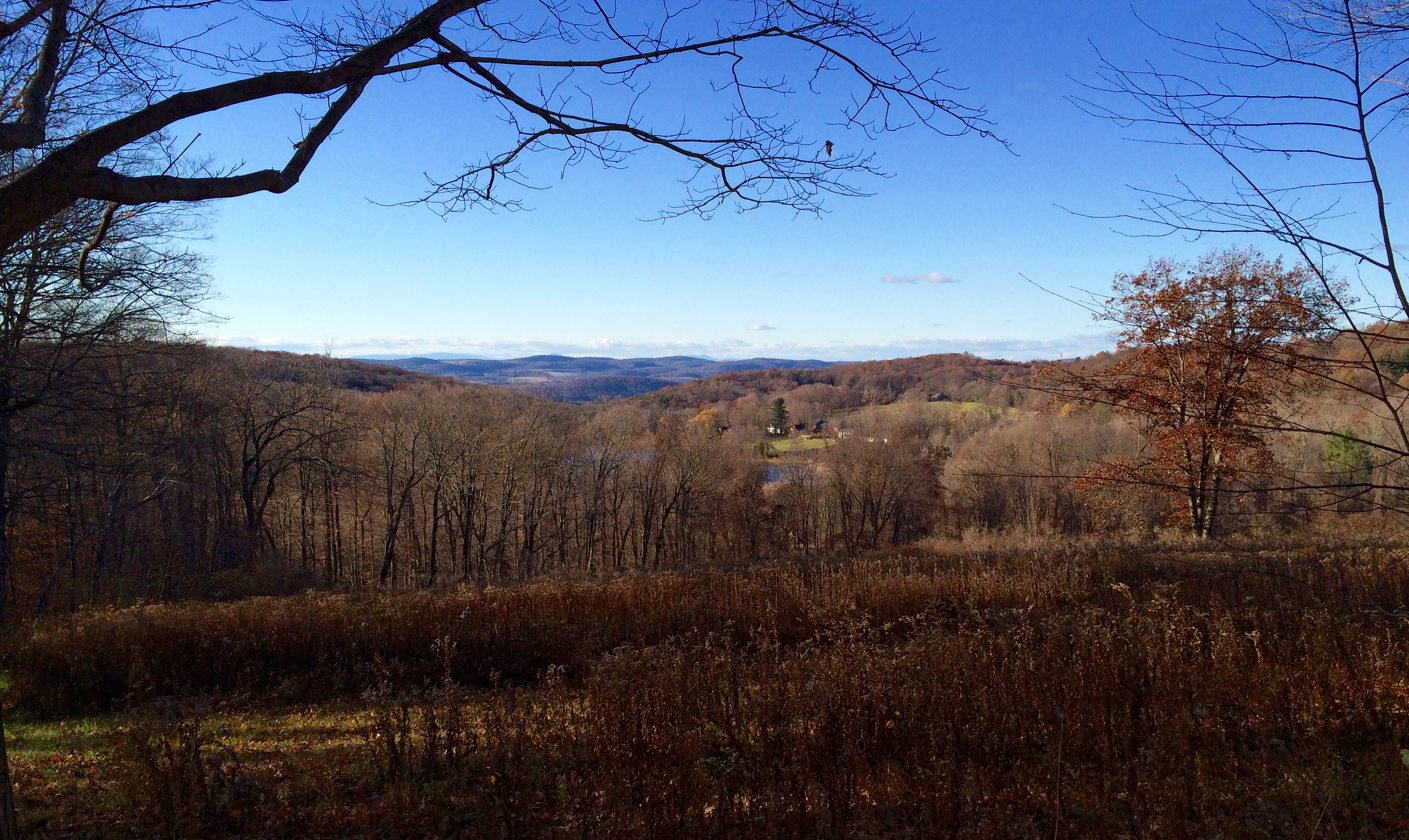
- View of the Sharon Audubon Center fields, Bog Meadow Pond and the Taconic Mountain range.
- Interactive map of Sharon Audubon Center
- Type: Nature center and wildlife sanctuary
- Location: 325 Cornwall Bridge Road; Sharon, CT, USA
- Coordinates: 41°51′25″N 73°27′18″W
- Area: 2,600 acres (1,100 ha)+
- Created: 1961
- Hiking trails: 11 mi (18 km) of trails
- Website: www.audubon.org/sharon

The Sharon Audubon Center is a wildlife sanctuary of the National Audubon Society in Sharon, Connecticut. The 1,147 acres (464 ha) of the Sharon Audubon Center property is primarily forest land with two ponds with 11 miles (18 km) of trails for visitors to use. Its facilities include a raptor aviary, a herb garden, a garden to attract birds and butterflies, a sugar house, a memorial room to Hal Borland, a small museum and store. Sharon Audubon Center is located at 325 Cornwall Bridge Road.

Associated with the Sharon Audubon Center is the Emily Winthrop Miles Wildlife Sanctuary, which currently encompasses 1,500 acres (610 ha) of land that is situated in 5,000 acres (2,000 ha) of protected open space. The residential facility within the wildlife sanctuary is used by interns and scientists who are conducting work in the area; none of the buildings are currently open to the public. Parking and access is available at 99 West Cornwall Road.

The Sharon Audubon Center offers environmental education programs for school groups. The Center also has summer and weekend environmental programs for adults and children.

== Sharon Audubon Center ==
Prior to the creation of the Sharon Audubon Center, the land was owned by Clement and Keyo Ford who lived on a property known as Bog Meadow Farm. In 1961, the Fords donated the estate to the National Audubon Society to serve as an educational nature center for future generations.

The main building features the Hal Borland Room, a memorial to the nature writer whose work first appeared in The New York Times in 1941. Some of Borland's essays were collected and published as Sundial of the Seasons in 1964. The room includes photos, his books and typewriter.

=== Trails ===
The Sharon Audubon Center has a collection of trails available for visitors to walk, including the wheelchair accessible Lucy Harvey Multiple Use Interpretative area, totaling 11 miles (18 km). Hal Borland is also honored with a 0.75 miles (1.21 km) trail that begins near the "native wildflower garden and continues through brushland and deciduous forest to a streamside hemlock forest." The native wildflower garden includes Virginia bluebells, Aquilegia, and white violets. Another trail, the Fern Trail, is a narrow and rocky 1 mile (1.6 km) woodland trail that follows the northern shore of Ford Pond. Over 70 species of birds have been recorded on the trail and there are many varieties of ferns to be seen. The Ford Trail is a 1.6-mile (2.6 km) trail through the deciduous and hemlock forest. The Hazelnut Trail is a 1-mile (1.6 km) loop trail. The Woodchuck Trail is a 2.35-mile (3.78 km) trail through open fields and the deciduous forest. The Hendrickson Bog Meadow Trail is a 1.6-mile (2.6 km) loop trail through the deciduous forest and along Bog Meadow Pond's shore.

== Emily Winthrop Miles Wildlife Sanctuary ==
The Emily Winthrop Miles Wildlife Sanctuary was originally property owned by Emily Winthrop Miles, a poet, writer and artist, who acquired 740 acres (300 ha) of land in Sharon, Connecticut. In 1962, as part of her will, Miles donated the property to the National Audubon Society. The property now includes 1,500 acres of land that is situated amidst 5,000 acres of protected open space. The wildlife sanctuary includes forested land and two miles of Carse Brook Wetlands, home to endangered flora and fauna species.

== See also ==
- List of nature centers in Connecticut
