= Annie Burr Jennings =

American philanthropist

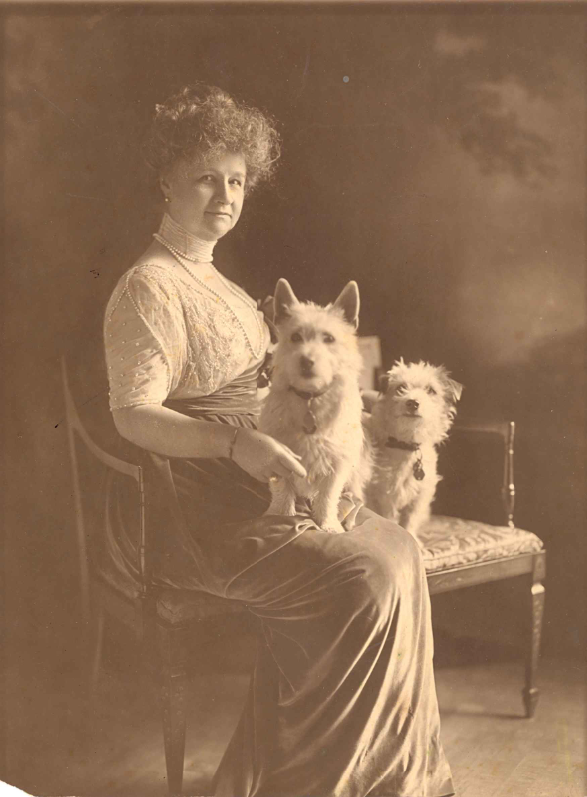
- Born: 1855; San Francisco, California
- Died: July 27, 1939 (aged 83); Fairfield, Connecticut

Annie Burr Jennings (1855 – 1939) was an American philanthropist, socialite, and landscape designer. For much of her life, she was a prominent resident of Fairfield, Connecticut where she funded many local infrastructure improvements and preservation efforts. Jennings was a distant relative of Aaron Burr.

== Biography ==
Annie Burr Jennings was born September 20, 1855. The Jennings family were original colonists to the Connecticut area around 1645. Her father, Oliver Burr Jennings, had moved the family to San Francisco to profit off the gold rush of the 1850s. He invested in John Rockefeller's Standard Oil Company in the 1860s-1870s and received a wealthy payout that would last generations. In the 1860s, the Jennings moved back to Fairfield, Connecticut and split their time between homes in New York City and Fairfield. Annie had two brothers and two sisters, one of which was the financier and politician Oliver Gould Jennings. Although she did not receive a college education, she likely received private tutoring while growing up and became a lifelong supporter and donor of Yale University.

Annie spent her family's wealth on philanthropic projects in and around Fairfield, Connecticut. In 1909, she built a private mansion at 375 Old Post Road in Fairfield that she named “Sunnie-Holme.” She never married and specified that Sunnie-Holme was to be destroyed after her death. She was a close friend of conservationist Mabel Osgood Wright. She was a distant relative of Aaron Burr and collected artifacts related to his life.

== Philanthropy ==
Using her family money, Annie Burr Jennings was a collector and philanthropist for most of her life. By the end of her life, the residents of Fairfield, Connecticut referred to her colloquially as the “First Lady of Fairfield.” Jennings was a member of the Connecticut Audubon Society and, alongside her friend Mabel Osgood Wright, funded the Birdcraft Museum and Sanctuary in 1914. With her brother, Oliver Gould Jennings, Annie was instrumental in the creation of the new Fairfield Memorial Library building in 1903, where there is a room named after her, and the Fairfield Historical Society. She donated land to the town for the establishment of the first high school, an American Legion building, and Jennings Beach. In 1914, she opened the grounds of her private mansion, Sunnie-Holme, to the public. She was a lifelong supporter of Yale University and would travel by private rail car to Yale to attend sporting events. Jennings also served on the board of the Woodbury Glebe House Restoration Committee, the Mount Vernon Ladies’ Association, the National Council for Historic Sites and Buildings, the Landmarks Society of Connecticut, and the Hroswitha Club, among other affiliations.

== Landscape Design ==
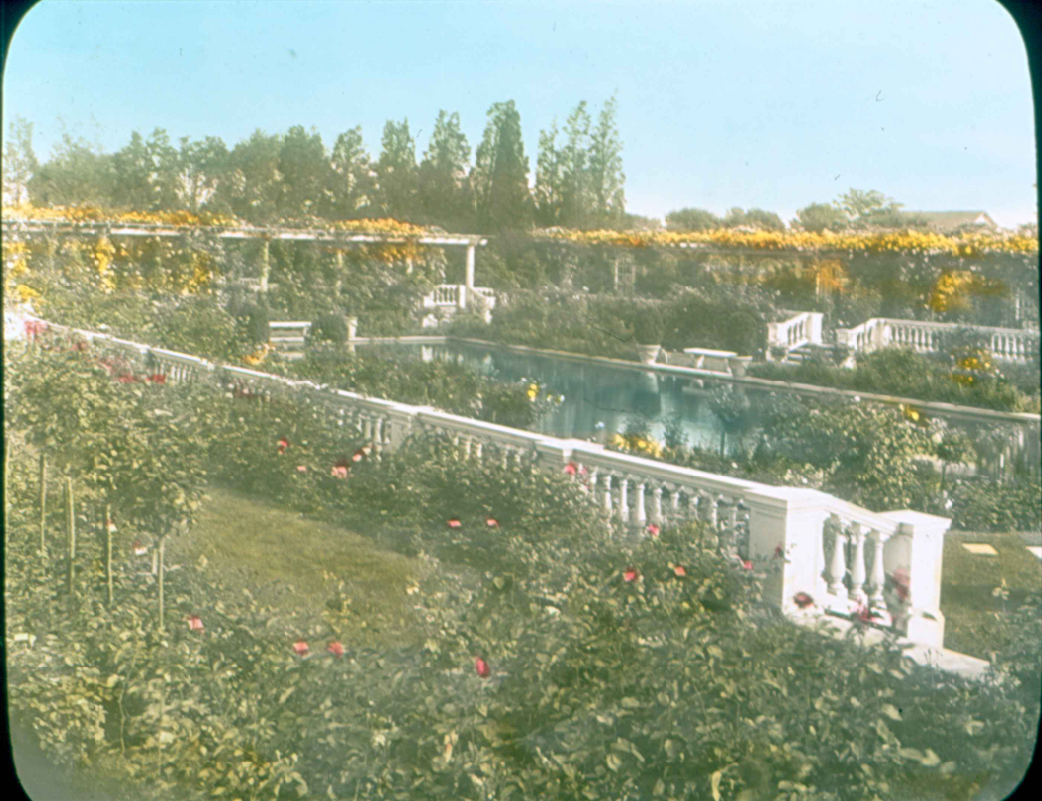
Sunnie-Holme Gardens

Annie Burr Jennings was a student of Gertrude Jekyll's garden writings as early as the 1910s. She designed some of the gardens at Sunnie-Holme in the style of Jekyll. At least five separately designed gardens existed on the grounds during Jennings’ life. The central formal rose garden was designed by Herbert Kellaway and Harriet Risley Foote. In 1916, the Olmsted Brothers visited the Sunnie-Holme gardens and advised on plantings. The gardens were open to the Fairfield public, although still privately owned and managed, in 1914. There are remnants of the gardens in place in what is now known as Sunnieholme Drive, but they were largely left to ruin after the Sunnie-Holme mansion was dismantled in 1940.

In 1926, Jennings traveled to Munstead Wood and met Gertrude Jekyll. She commissioned Jekyll to design a colonial-era garden plan for the Old Glebe House in Woodbury, Connecticut, which Jennings was involved in restoring at the time. This garden plan was not realized until its rediscovery in the 1970s and restoration of the garden to the Jekyll plan is still ongoing.

== Politics ==
While not involved in political office, as a wealthy citizen, Annie Burr Jennings supported various political causes of her time. She was an anti-suffragist and organized a chapter of the Connecticut Association Opposed to Woman Suffrage.
