= Emily Winthrop Miles =

American painter, sculptor, poet and photographer

- Born: March 10, 1893; New York, New York
- Died: December 25, 1962 (aged 69)
- Occupations: Sculptor, Painter, Poet, Photographer, Socialite

Emily Winthrop Miles (1893–1962) was an American painter, sculptor, poet, photographer and one of the contributors to the Audubon Sharon, which consists of the Sharon Audubon Center and the Emily Winthrop Miles Wildlife Sanctuary. She was also an avid collector of a wide range of glass and ceramics, her 948 pieces-of 18th Century glass and ceramics was donated to the Brooklyn Museum.

== Biography ==
She was a direct descendant of John Winthrop and the daughter of Grenville Lindall Winthrop, a Wall Street banker, and Mary Tallmadge Trevor Winthrop. Emily Winthrop grew up in New York City and at Groton Place, her family estate in Lenox, Massachusetts. She was noted in her community as an avid dog lover and an expert judge of Pekinese. She studied sculpture with Daniel Chester French, as well as with some of the best known women sculptors of the day, Abastenia St. Leger Eberle, Brenda Putnam and Harriet Frishmuth.

“In September 1924, Emily Winthrop eloped with the 33 year-old widowed estate chauffeur, Corey Lucian Miles (1891–1960), along with her sister, Kate, who eloped with Darwin Morse, formerly the Groton Place poulterer.” The four were married in Stockbridge and then moved to Santa Barbara, California before returning to Massachusetts a few years later.

== Work ==
Miles work can be found in art collections;

- Montclair Art Museum, Montclair, New Jersey
- Faces in American Art, 1957 exhibit, The Metropolitan Museum of Art, New York, New York
- Harvard University, Harvard Art Museums, Fogg Museum, Cambridge, Massachusetts
- Museum of Fine Arts, Springfield, Massachusetts
- Southern Vermont Art Center, Manchester, Vermont
- City University of New York, New York, New York

=== Collections ===
The Brooklyn Museum has a Emily Winthrop Miles Collection, bestowed in 1962 after her death and a Emily Winthrop Miles Fund. The collection features primarily 18th century Wedgwood decorative art pottery. She was also known to collect 18th and 19th century glass, 18th century drawings and paintings by John Gould, Auguste Rodin, Alexander Calder and John James Audubon and his son, John Woodhouse Audubon.
