= Mabel Osgood Wright =

American conservationist and writer

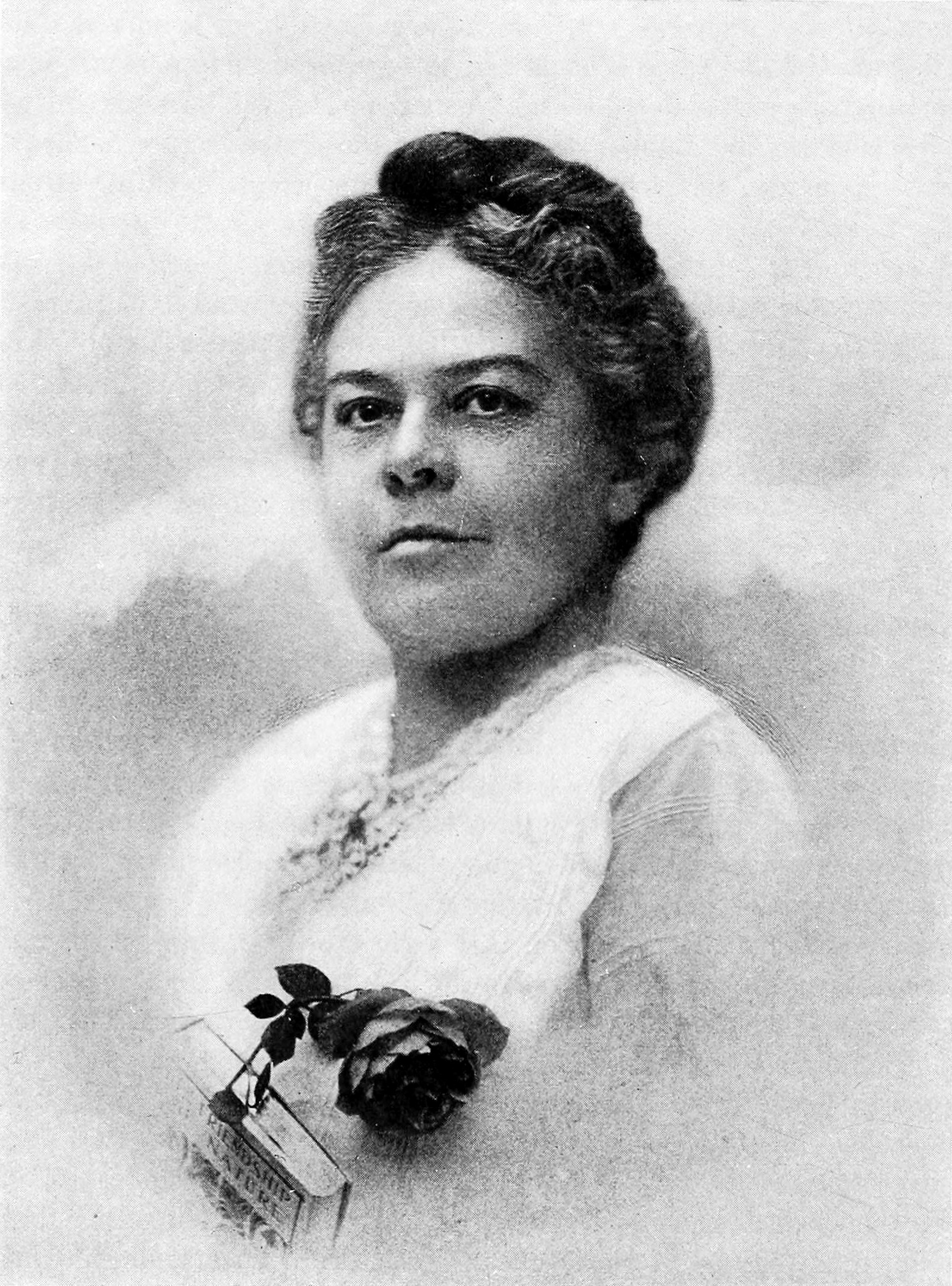
- Audubon Society Portrait
- Born: January 26, 1859; New York City, U.S.
- Died: July 16, 1934 (aged 75); Fairfield, Connecticut, U.S.
- Resting place: Oak Lawn Cemetery; Fairfield, Connecticut, U.S.
- Writing career
- Pen name: Barbara
- Subjects: nature, gardening
- Notable works: Birdcraft: A Field Book of Two Hundred Song, Game, and Water Birds

Mabel Osgood Wright (January 26, 1859 – July 16, 1934) was an American writer and conservationist. She was an early leader in the Audubon movement who wrote extensively about nature and birds.

== Early years and education ==
Mabel Osgood was the daughter of Samuel and Ellen Haswell (Murdock) Osgood. She was born in New York City on January 26, 1859, one of three daughters, and was educated at home and in private schools. Samuel Osgood was a Harvard-educated Unitarian minister and published author, who was associated with writers and businessmen including George Bancroft, Oliver Wendell Holmes, and J. P. Morgan. Osgood frequently accompanied her father to lectures at the New York Historical Society and other cultural events.

== Career ==
On September 25, 1884, she was married to James Osborne Wright, an Englishman; after an extended visit to England, the couple moved to Fairfield, Connecticut.

Although Wright wished to attend medical school at Cornell, she was encouraged by her husband and father to pursue writing instead. Wright's first printed work (apart from a few verses published anonymously in the Evening Post and the New York Times), was the essay "A New England May Day", which appeared in the Evening Post in 1893. This work was collected with other pieces into her first book, The Friendship of Nature, published by Macmillan in 1894. The book was illustrated with photographs taken by Osgood, and was praised by Wendell Holmes.

In 1894 and 1895, Wright studied at the American Museum of Natural History under Joel Asaph Allen and Frank Chapman, which culminated in the publication of her Birdcraft: A Field Book of Two Hundred Song, Game, and Water Birds (1895), one of the most popular bird guides of the early 20th century. A prototype of the modern field guide to birds for a popular audience, Birdcraft featured color reproductions from John James Audubon and other artists to illustrate species commonly encountered at home or in a neighboring park. A later edition credits Louis Agassiz Fuertes as a contributing artist. Frank Chapman described it as "one of the first and most successful bird manuals." Two years later, Wright's Citizen Bird: Scenes from Bird-life in Plain English for Beginners, a collaboration with Elliott Coues, appeared.

Wright helped organize the Connecticut Audubon Society, and became its first president in 1898, a position that she held for 26 years. Under her directorship, the Society supported several conservation legislative bills, including the International Migratory Bird Treaty Act in 1918. From 1905 to 1928, Wright was a director of the National Association of Audubon Societies (now the National Audubon Society). She also served as the editor of the Audubon Society's Bird Lore from 1899 to 1910 alongside William Dutcher, a leading ornithology journal that acted as a precursor to Audubon Magazine, and remained a contributing editor until her death.

Her work at Bird Lore included children's education, and she helped to establish "Bird Day" which promoted educational programming and conservation training for school children. Wright became an associate member of the American Ornithologists' Union in 1895, and was one of the first three women raised to elective membership in 1901. Joining her were Florence Merriam Bailey and Olive Thorne Miller.

Wright pioneered bird protection by establishing and designing Birdcraft Sanctuary in 1914, near her home in Fairfield. She obtained financial backing for the sanctuary from her friend, Annie Burr Jennings, a Standard Oil heiress. The refuge is the oldest private songbird sanctuary in the United States, and was designated as a National Historic Landmark in 1993.

From her beginnings as a writer about children, nature, and outdoor life, Wright's reception from the public was cordial. However, when she began to publish works of fiction, she concealed her identity as their author until they had won recognition independently, taking the pseudonym of "Barbara". Much of the material to which she gave attractive literary expression she found in the large garden at her home in Fairfield.

Although Wright is remembered more for her nature writing, some aspects of her fiction are notable. Some of these romances were unconventional in form, combining passages of fictional narrative with letters, diary entries, and nonfictional pieces of autobiography, social criticism, and gardening lore. It is true that her fictional range was narrow, limited demographically to the upper classes of Manhattan and New England and emotionally to scenes of domestic piety and sentimentality. But her observations of changing social patterns (the "new magnates" of the new century and increased suburbanization) and of the growth of feminism are worthwhile. Her ambivalence toward the changing role of women is interesting, with sympathy on the one hand and shrill attacks on careerism on the other.

On July 16, 1934, she succumbed to hypertensive myocardial disease with angina, and died in Fairfield. She is buried in Oak Lawn Cemetery in that town.

In 1998, Wright was inducted into the Connecticut Women's Hall of Fame.

== Selected works ==
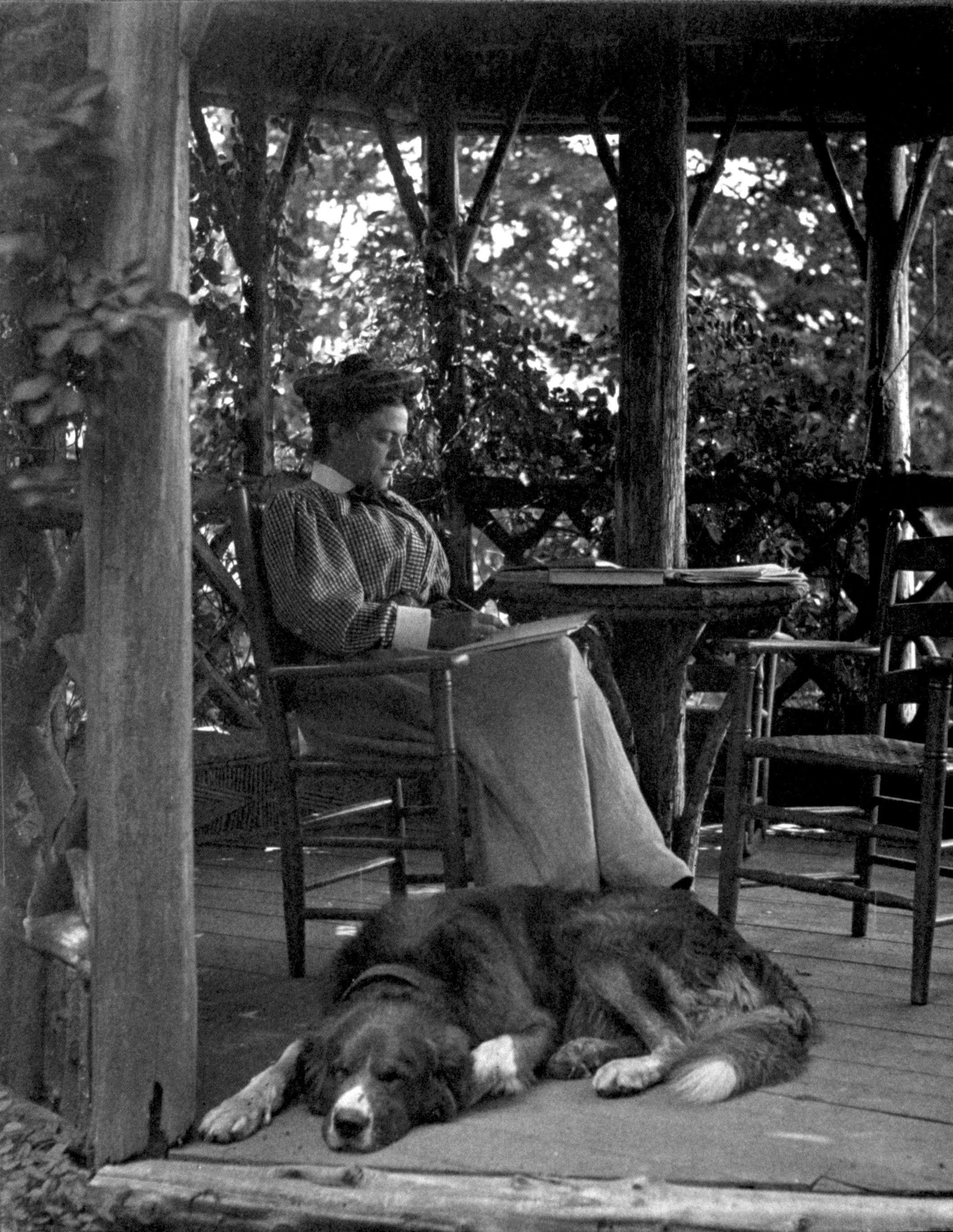
Mabel Osgood Wright photographed by her husband James Osborne Wright

- Wright, Mabel Osgood (1894). The Friendship of Nature:A New England Chronicle of Birds and Flowers. New York, NY: Macmillan.
- Wright, Mabel Osgood (1895). Birdcraft: A Field Book of Two Hundred Song, Game, and Water Birds. New York, NY: Macmillan.
- Wright, Mabel Osgood; Coues, Elliott (1897). Citizen Bird: Scenes from Bird-life in Plain English for Beginners. New York, NY: Macmillan.
- Wright, Mabel Osgood (1898). Four-footed Americans and Their Kin. New York, NY: Macmillan.
- Wright, Mabel Osgood (1901). Flowers and Ferns in Their Haunts. New York, NY: Macmillan.
- Wright, Mabel Osgood (1901). The Garden of a Commuter's Wife, Recorded by the Gardener. New York, NY: Macmillan. In the 1911 reprint edition, no name appears on the title page save "The Gardener."
- Wright, Mabel Osgood (1903). Aunt Jimmy's Will. New York, NY: Macmillan.
- Wright, Mabel Osgood (1903). People of the Whirlpool, From the Experience Book of a Commuter's Wife.
- Wright, Mabel Osgood (1906). The Garden, You, and I. New York, NY: Macmillan. Under the pseudonym "Barbara."
- Wright, Mabel Osgood (1906). The Heart of Nature. New York, NY: Macmillan.
- Wright, Mabel Osgood (1907). Gray Lady and the Birds: Stories of the Bird Year for Home and School. New York, NY: Macmillan.
- Wright, Mabel Osgood (1909). Poppea of the Post Office. New York, NY: Macmillan. Title page has "By Mabel Osgood Wright (Barbara)".
- Wright, Mabel Osgood (1922). The Making of Birdcraft Sanctuary. South Norwalk, CT: Gorham Press.

Mabel Osgood Wright's work also includes the following. Several of the works of fiction first appeared under the pseudonym of "Barbara".

- Tommy-Anne and the Three Hearts: A Nature Story (1896)
- Wabeno, the Magician (1899), a sequel to Tommy-Anne
- The Dream Fox Story Book (1900)
- Dogtown (1902)
- The Woman Errant (1904)
- The Open Window (1908)
- The Love that Lives (1911)
- The Stranger at the Gate (1913)
- My New York (1926)
- Eudora's Men (1931)
