= Connecticut Audubon Society Center at Fairfield =

Nature center and wildlife sanctuary in Connecticut, US

Coordinates: 41.2017°N 73.2924°W

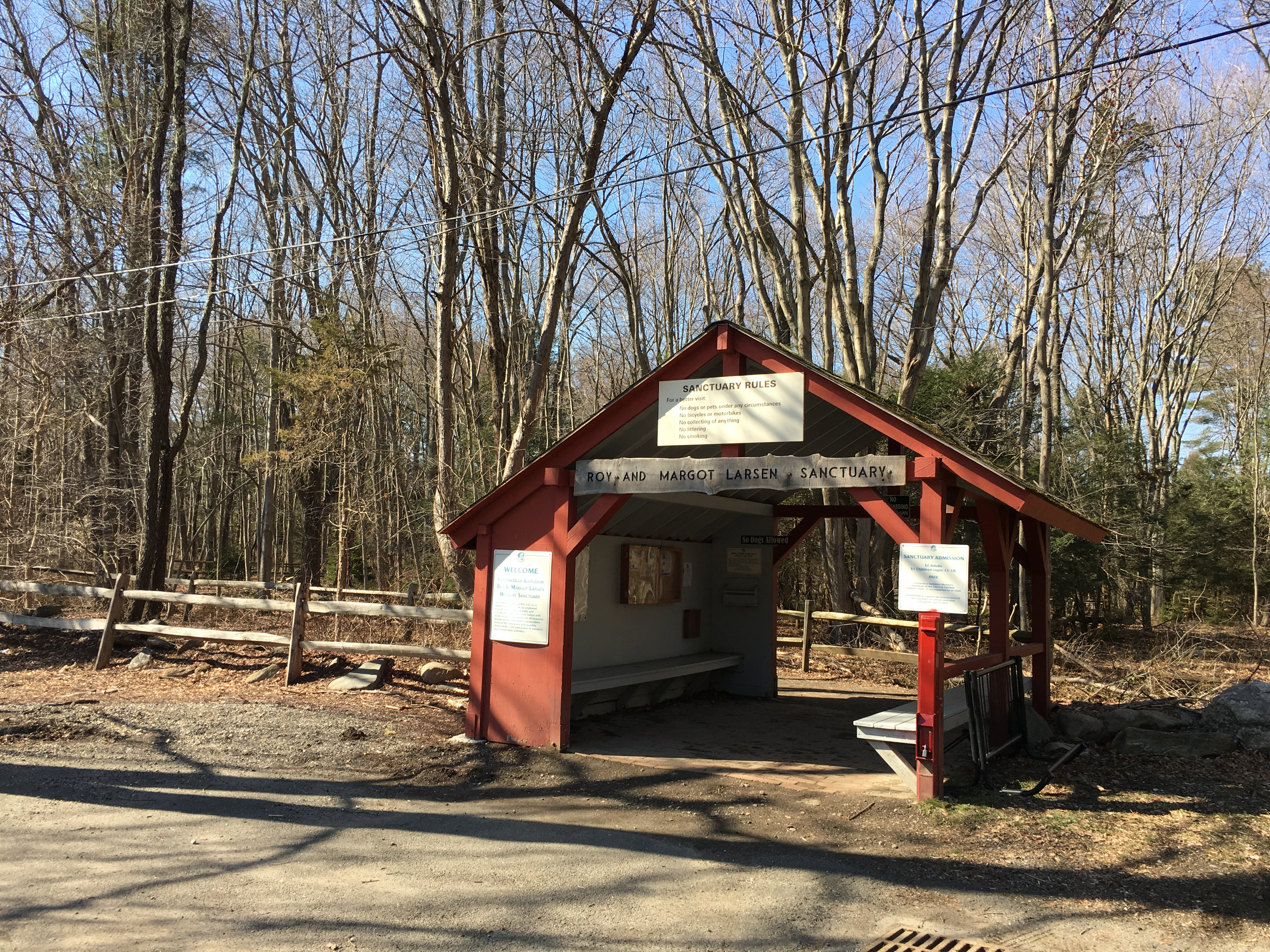
Connecticut Audubon Society Center at Fairfield - entrance to the Roy and Margot Larsen Wildlife Sanctuary

The Connecticut Audubon Society Center at Fairfield is a nature center and wildlife sanctuary in the Greenfield Hill area of Fairfield, Connecticut. Constructed in 1971, the center features classrooms for environmental education programs, live animals on display, natural history exhibits, a nature library, a solar greenhouse and a gift shop. Outside there is a compound with non-releasable rescued birds of prey, including owls, hawks, peregrine falcons, a turkey vulture and other raptors.

The center maintains the 152-acre (0.62 km^{2}) Roy and Margot Larsen Wildlife Sanctuary with 7 miles (11 km) of trails, including the Chiboucas Wheelchair-accessible Trail for the Disabled, a pond observation platform and interpretive signs. The trail habitats include woods, marsh, stream, pond and meadow.

Environmental programs are offered for youth, school groups, Scout troops and other organizations, as well as summer camp and after school classes. Issues relating to birds, their habits and related environmental topics are a special focus.

The Connecticut Audubon Society Center at Fairfield is one of five nature centers and 19 wildlife sanctuaries operated by the Connecticut Audubon Society, which is separate from the National Audubon Society. The building is closed on Sundays.
