= Woodcock Nature Center =

Nature center in Wilton, Connecticut, US

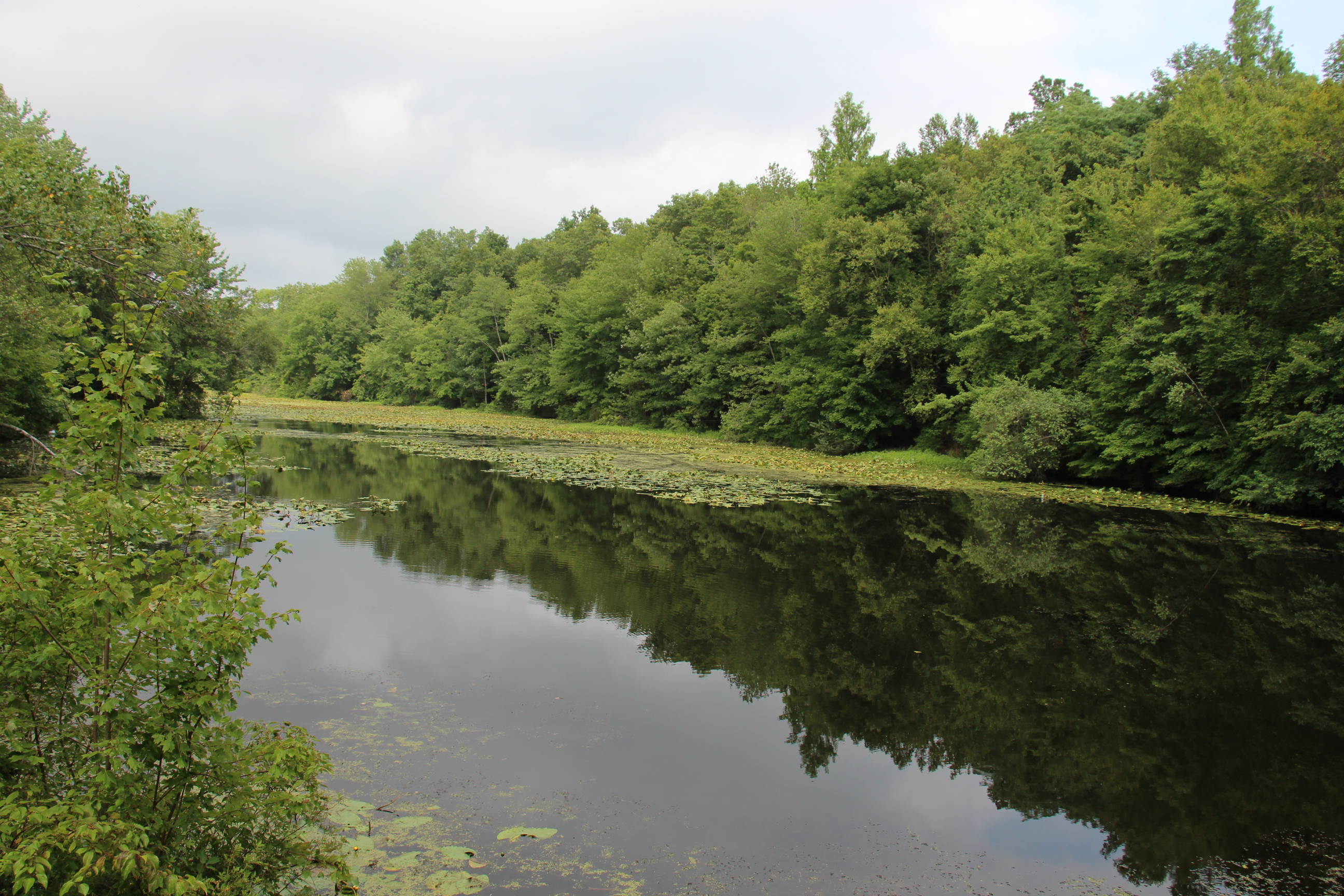
- Pond at Woodcock Nature Center
- Interactive map of Woodcock Nature Center
- Type: Nature center and wildlife sanctuary
- Location: 56 Deer Run Road; Wilton, CT, USA
- Coordinates: 41°14′51″N 73°28′25″W
- Area: 179 acres (72 ha)
- Created: 1972
- Website: www.woodcocknaturecenter.org

The Woodcock Nature Center is a non-profit nature center located at 56 Deer Run Road in Wilton, Connecticut. The center is situated on 179 acres (0.72 km^{2}) of state-protected land with 3 miles (4.8 km) of trails traversing a mixture of habitats, including woods with stands of maple, beech, oak and hickory trees, a pond and wetlands.

The center's building houses of local and exotic snakes, frogs and lizards, as well as a few rehabilitated birds of prey that were too injured to be released back into the wild.

The center offers summer camp, after school, and other programs for children and school groups.

== History ==
After a 1955 flood devastated the Norwalk River Valley, the state of Connecticut bought up and safety-dammed several feeder streams in order to control floods. About 1969, Ridgefield First Selectman J. Mortimer Woodcock arranged to lease 140 acres (0.57 km^{2}) of the property along Spectacle Creek in Wilton and Ridgefield (130 acres in Wilton) for a nature center, and in 1972 the Woodcock Nature Center was opened.
