= Charles E. Wheeler Wildlife Management Area =

Protected area in Connecticut, United States

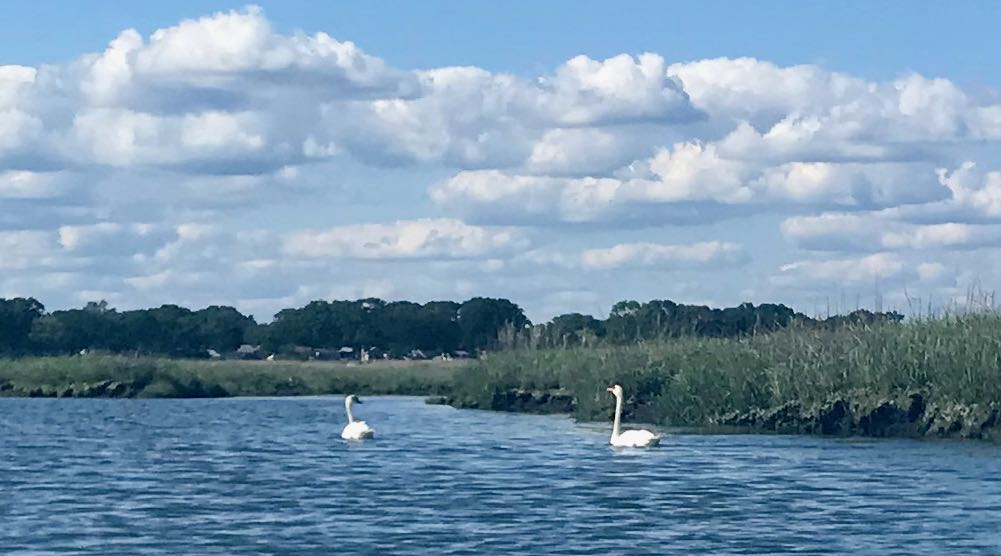
- Swans at high tide in Charles E. Wheeler WMA
- Interactive map of Charles E. Wheeler; Wildlife Management Area
- Location: Devon, Milford, New Haven, Connecticut, United States
- Coordinates: 41°10′52″N 73°06′35″W
- Area: 750 acres (300 ha)
- Administrator: Connecticut Department of Energy and Environmental Protection
- Website: Charles E. Wheeler WMA

Charles E. Wheeler Wildlife Management Area is a 750-acre (300 ha) brackish tidal marsh, nature preserve and hunting area owned by the state of Connecticut located in Devon (village), Milford, New Haven County, Connecticut.

The Charles E. Wheeler WMA is located on the eastern shore (Milford side) of the mouth of the Housatonic River. It is protected from Long Island Sound by a barrier beach known as Milford Point.

The main channel of the Housatonic River flows north and south to the west of the Charles E. Wheeler WMA, however a substantial amount of the water flows into and through the estuary itself particularly with the tide.

The US Army Corps of Engineers dredged the Housatonic River channel between the WMA and Stratford in both 1976 and 2012. Without dredging, sediment from upriver would expand the Nells Island salt marsh area into the main channel of the river, obstructing recreational boating and commercial shipping.

== Flora ==
Most of the WMA's wetlands, both those covered and those exposed at high tide, are covered with plants. The primary fauna are a low marsh smooth cordgrass (Spartina alterniflora Loisel) and a high marsh saltmeadow cordgrass (Spartina patens Aiton). The genus Spartina was merged into the genus Sporobolus in 2014 (based on research in the journal Taxon) but a report in the journal Ecology in 2019 (authored by an interdisciplinary team of experts) supported the creation of the separate genus Spartina.

== Fauna ==
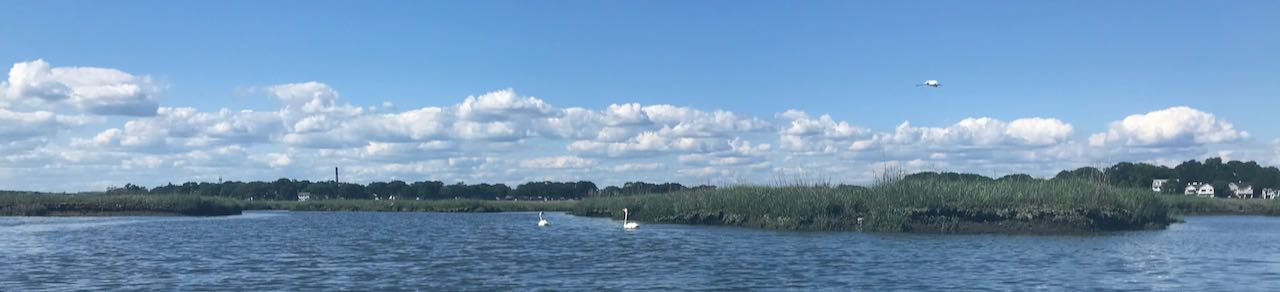
Wide view of swans at high tide in Charles E. Wheeler WMA

Along with the Milford Point barrier beach and associated sand bars, the WMA is one of the most important migratory bird stopover areas on Long Island Sound, particularly for shorebirds.

The WMA is a refuge for ducks, geese, swans and many other migratory birds.

There are also insects, crustaceans, fish and mammals.

== Recreation ==
Hunting, fishing, bird watching, photography and boating are all popular recreational pursuits in the WMA.

Hunting (of waterfowl only) is only allowed in season with permits.

Motorized and non-motorized watercraft are permitted and used for hunting, fishing and recreation (particularly kayaks, canoes, stand up paddleboards (SUPs) and rowboats with shallow drafts and narrow beams for deftly navigating the tidal creeks and estuarine channels).

Dangers to consider when visiting the WMA :

- Timing the tides in order to enter and leave the WMA by watercraft is a critical issue.
- It is easy to become lost in a maze of passages and miss the time window for leaving the WMA.
- The powerful tides can also create strong currents at critical choke points in the marsh.

The best time to enter and explore the WMA is at (or better yet, just before) high tide.

The narrowness and shallowness of the marsh channels and creek passages is a "deep" concern.

While many marsh creeks are navigable at high tide, many of the waterways inside the WMA become mud flats at low tide, which are extremely difficult to traverse. High tide in Long Island Sound off Milford, as well as Short Beach in Stratford, is several minutes ahead of high tide in the WMA.

== Access ==
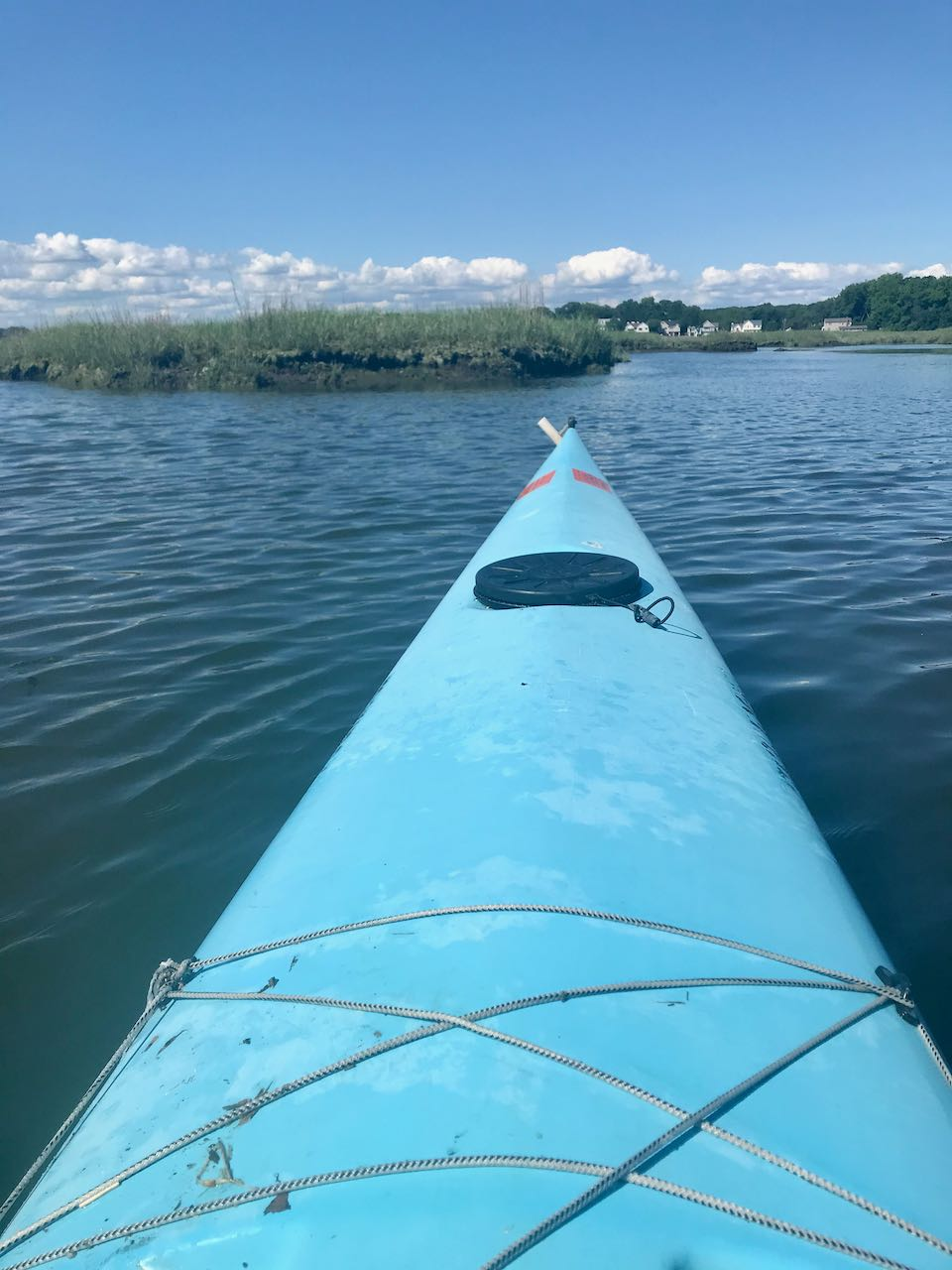
Sea Kayaking at high tide in Charles E Wheeler WMA

Access to the Charles E. Wheeler WMA is only possible from the water (e.g. watercraft) though there are several locations for viewing the salt marshes from the shore of Milford Point, the Connecticut Audubon Society Coastal Center or the Milford Conservation Land Trust property ("Nancy's Meadow") at the intersection of First Avenue and Milford Point Road in Devon's Laurel Beach neighborhood.

For both viewing the marshes and launching watercraft there are several car trailer and "cartop" launches near the WMA:

- The closest and easiest access to the WMA is an unimproved state boat launch and parking for cars and boat trailers with an unpaved road entrance at the Second Avenue end of Court Street in Milford, Connecticut. It is operated by the Connecticut Department of Energy and Environmental Protection.
- Also very close is a very limited public access location (with no dedicated parking) at the end of Deerwood Avenue near the junction with Third Avenue in Milford.
- On the Housatonic River one half mile north of the WMA is the Housatonic River State Boat Launch and parking lot under the I-95 bridge at the end of Naugatuck Avenue in Milford. Convenient to Interstate 95.

Launching watercraft from the Connecticut Audubon Society Coastal center is prohibited.

Launching from the Stewart B. McKinney National Wildlife Refuge Milford Point Unit is difficult as there is no public road access (only a private road and beach) though landing there temporarily is allowed.

The speed of vessels in the Charles E. Wheeler WMA is restricted by the Regulations of Connecticut State Agencies TITLE 15. Navigation and Aeronautics, specifically the DEEP Boating Safety section:

§15-121-B15m. Housatonic River regulation

... "(c) No person shall operate a motorboat in excess of Slow No Wake within: ... (2) the channel east of Nells Island and all channels, creeks or waterways within the Charles E. Wheeler Wildlife Management Area, including Nells Island;

...

== Topology ==
Several islands are a part of the Charles E. Wheeler Wildlife Management Area:

- Duck Island
- Nells Island

The adjacent Connecticut Audubon Society Coastal Center at Milford Point and Smith-Hubbell Wildlife Refuge & Bird Sanctuary focuses on conservation education with displays about area wildlife and meeting rooms. The Coastal Center offers educational programs, demonstrations, and workshops about wildlife (in particular migratory birds). Outside there are demonstration sites, self-guided hiking trails to the sand bars and beaches of Long Island Sound as well as to the WMA, both an observation tower and deck, bird houses and outdoor education classrooms.

Milford Point (also known as the Milford Point Unit), the curved peninsula barrier beach "arm" protecting the Charles E. Wheeler Wildlife Management Area, is one of eight units that make up the Stewart B. McKinney National Wildlife Refuge which are administered by the U.S. Fish and Wildlife Service. As one of the most important migratory bird stopover areas on Long Island Sound, a majority of the 8.5 acre Milford Point is protected from human contact for much of the year to protect nesting areas of the Piping Plover threatened bird species. Several semi-permanent sand bars in Long Island Sound are located just off Milford Point and some connect to Milford Point, particularly at low tide.

== History ==
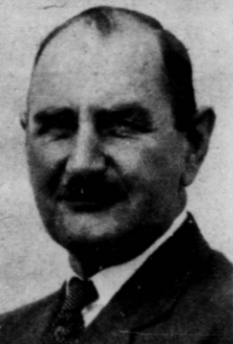
Charles E. Wheeler

Charles E. (Shang) Wheeler (1872-1949) was a Connecticut state senator and representative, outdoorsman, conservationist and celebrated amateur decoy carver as well as the general manager of the Connecticut Oyster Farms Company from 1912 to 1946) in nearby Milford, Connecticut.

According to the Milford Hall of Fame website, "Shang" Wheeler was also a "superior football player, amateur boxer, a nationally known breeder of Llewellyn setters, a champion fly caster who also created many new flies, and a political cartoonist." as well as a "among the nation's leading experts on oysters and their cultivation,".

Born in Westport, Fairfield, Connecticut, United States, he lived in Stratford, Fairfield, Connecticut, United States. He was a Republican member of the Connecticut House of Representatives from Stratford from 1923 to 1926 and a member of the Connecticut State Senate 25th District in 1927 to 1928 as well as from 1939 to 1940.

In 1953 a Special Act of the Connecticut General Assembly placed Nell's Island under the jurisdiction and control of the State Board of Fisheries and Game.

In 1955 a Special Act of the Connecticut General Assembly changed the name of Nell's Island to the Charles E. Wheeler Wildlife Management Area.

The WMA was named for Charles (Shang) Wheeler because of his work on conservation as well as to preserve the wetlands in the mouth of the Housatonic River as well as his fundraising work in 1935 to upgrade the U.S. Bureau of Fisheries lab at Milford Harbor which had been established in 1918 to study shellfish in Long Island Sound. In 1951 the Lab named a research vessel the R/V Shang Wheeler, which it used until 2001. The Milford Lab is now under NOAA's National Marine Fisheries Service and is known as a part of the Northeast Fisheries Science Center.

By 1950, the Housatonic River near the area then known as the "Milford Marsh" and Nells Island was in danger of "silting" in. On Wednesday, January 25, 1950 the United States House Committee on Appropriations of the 81st Congress held a hearing before the subcommittee on Deficiencies and Army Civil Functions regarding Department of Army Appropriations for 1951. Several Connecticut business leaders as well as government commissions and conservation groups had filed written recommendations to the US Congress to fund the "Housatonic River Dredging Project, Devon, Conn." to dredge the river channel but also pleaded with the committee not to dump the dredged material in Nells Island and the adjacent marshlands.

In 1976 and 2012 the Housatonic River channel between the WMA and Stratford was also dredged to keep the WMA's marshlands from expanding into the main channel of the river.

== See also ==
- Devon - Village in Milford Connecticut
- Duck Island (Milford, Connecticut)
- Nells Island
- Stewart B. McKinney National Wildlife Refuge
