= Connecticut Audubon Society Birdcraft Museum and Sanctuary =

Coordinates: 41.1443°N 73.2587°W

- Birdcraft Museum & Sanctuary
- U.S. National Register of Historic Places
- U.S. National Historic Landmark District
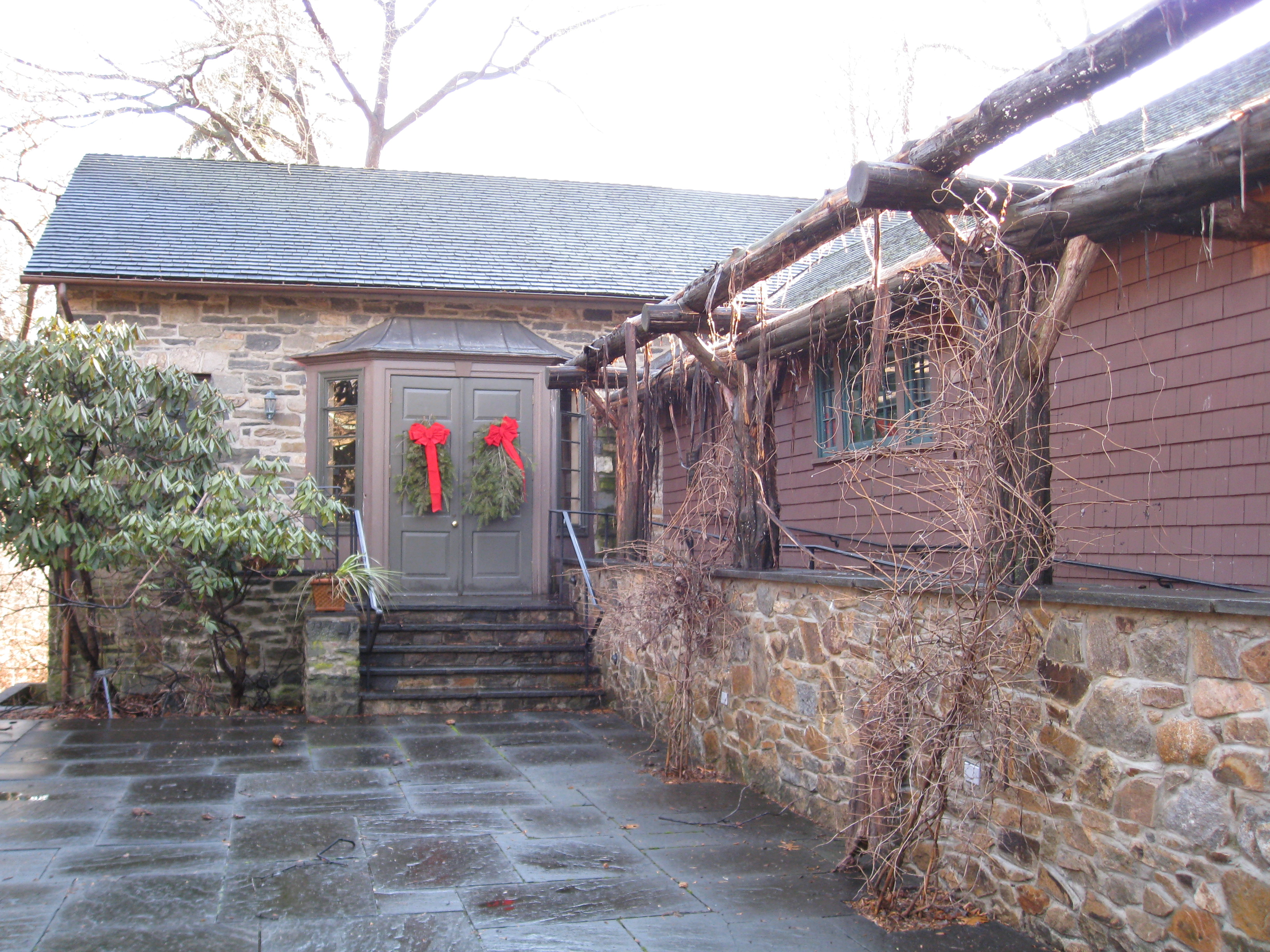

- Location within Connecticut Location within the United States
- Location: 314 Unquowa Road, Fairfield, Connecticut
- Area: 6.5 acres (2.6 ha)
- Built: 1914
- NRHP reference No.: 82004371

Significant dates
- Added to NRHP: June 23, 1982
- Designated NHLD: April 19, 1993

The Connecticut Audubon Society Birdcraft Museum and Sanctuary, also known as Birdcraft Museum & Sanctuary or simply Birdcraft Sanctuary, in Fairfield, Connecticut is the oldest private songbird sanctuary in the United States. It was established in 1914 by Mabel Osgood Wright.

The 6-acre (2.4 ha) site was originally planted as a refuge to attract, harbor and feed migratory and resident birds. The Connecticut Audubon Society has documented sightings of more than 120 species of birds at this site, and the organization has operated a bird banding station here since 1979. The natural history museum contains mounted preserved animals displayed in dioramas depicting Connecticut's wildlife as it existed at the end of the 20th century, as well as the Frederick T. Bedford Collection of African Animals.

Structures at the sanctuary include a frame bungalow and a museum building, the former built as a caretaker's residence. Significant man-made or man-sculpted features of the sanctuary include a pond, gardens, and meadows, as well as a chimney constructed as a nesting spot for chimney swifts. Most of these structures were built in 1914, although the museum and bungalow have both been enlarged (substantially in the case of the museum) since then.

The Birdcraft Museum and Sanctuary was listed on the National Register of Historic Places in 1982, and was declared a National Historic Landmark in 1993. Its establishment marked the revival of a bird conservation movement which had begun in the 1880s but languished and declined since then.

The property is one of six nature centers and 22 wildlife sanctuaries operated by Connecticut Audubon, which is not affiliated with the National Audubon Society.

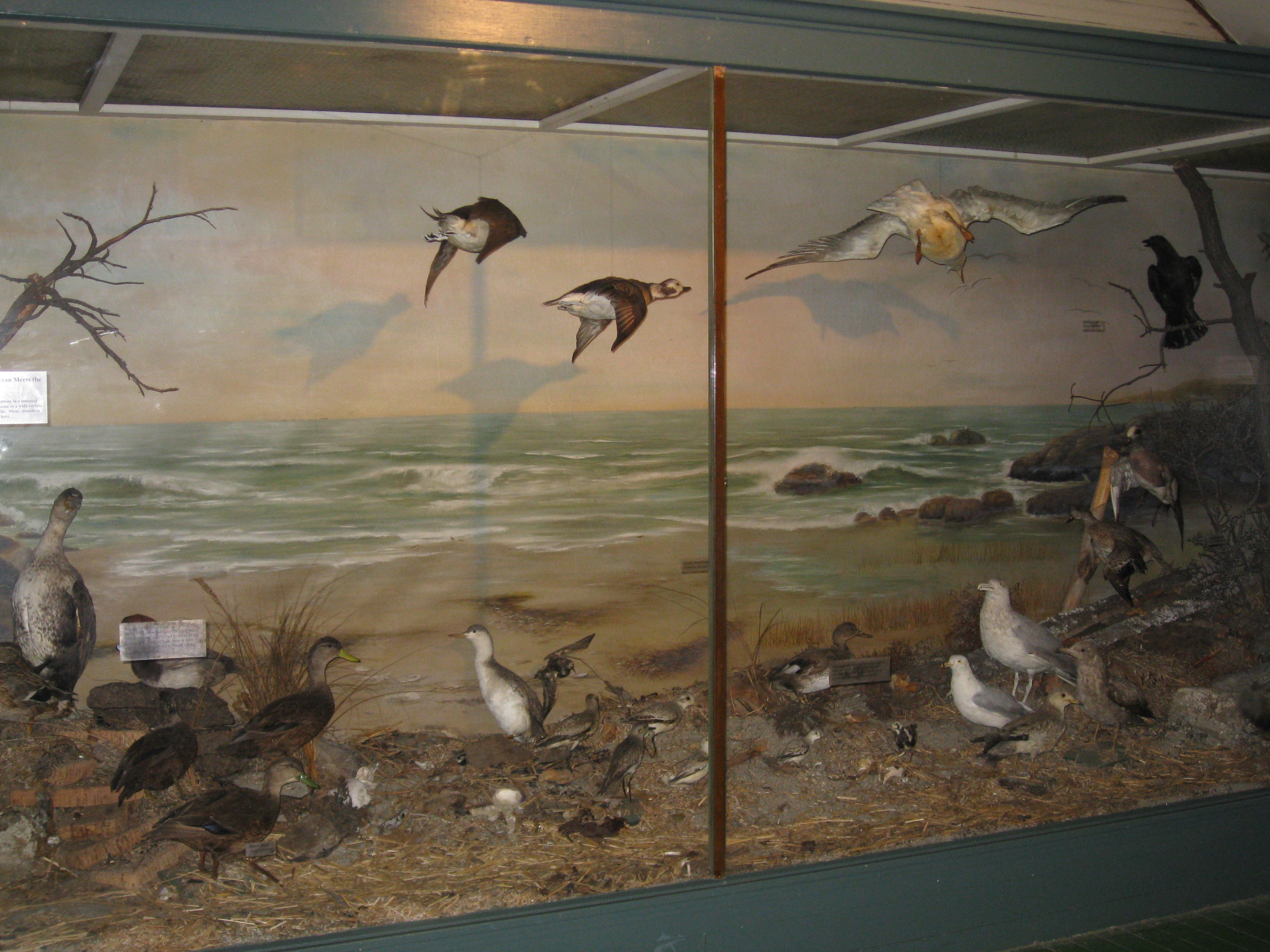
Shore Diorama

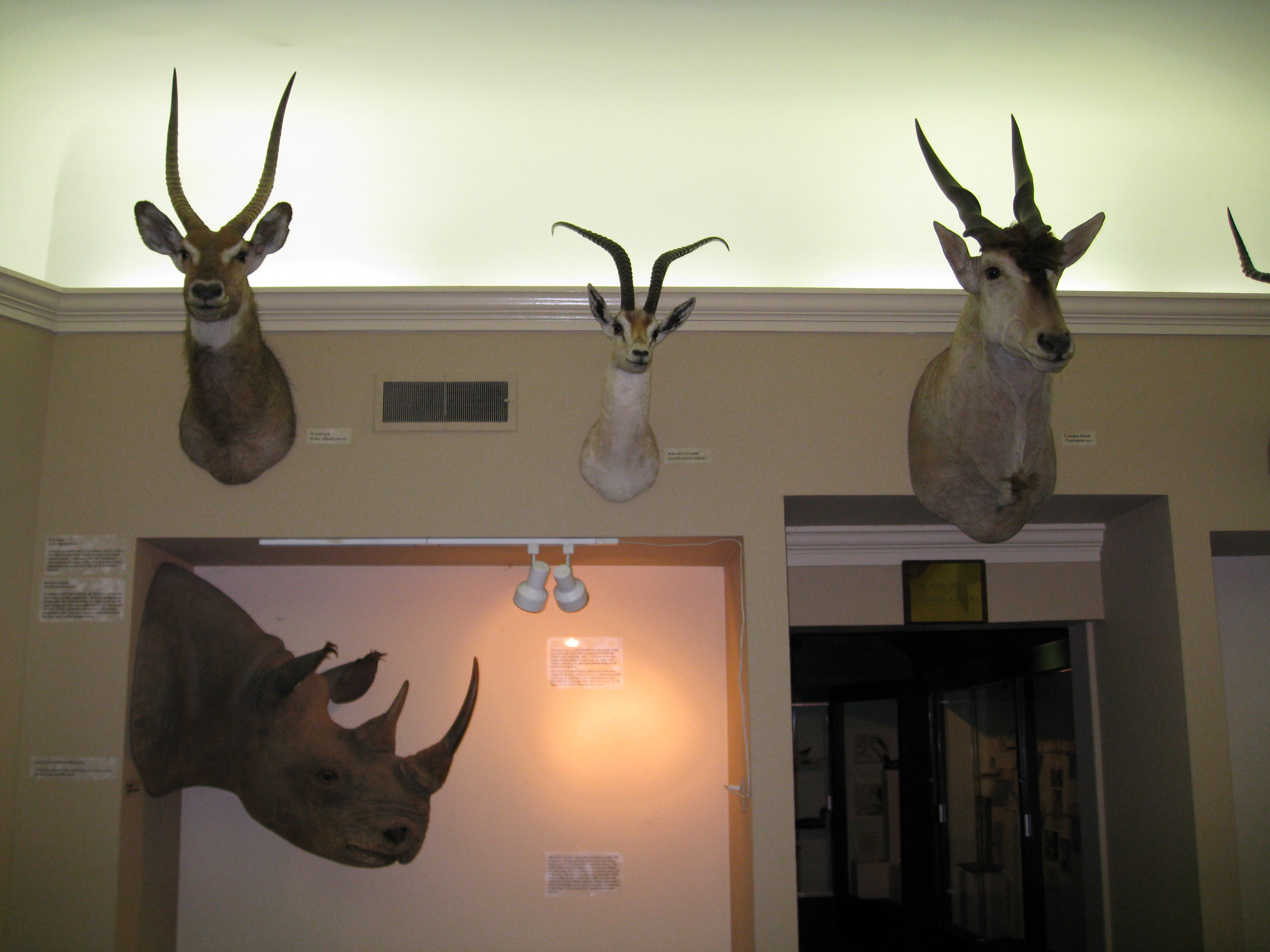
Part of the African animal collection

== See also ==
- List of National Historic Landmarks in Connecticut
- National Register of Historic Places listings in Fairfield County, Connecticut
