= Connecticut Audubon Society =

American non-profit organization

Coordinates: 41.1443°N 73.2587°W

The Connecticut Audubon Society

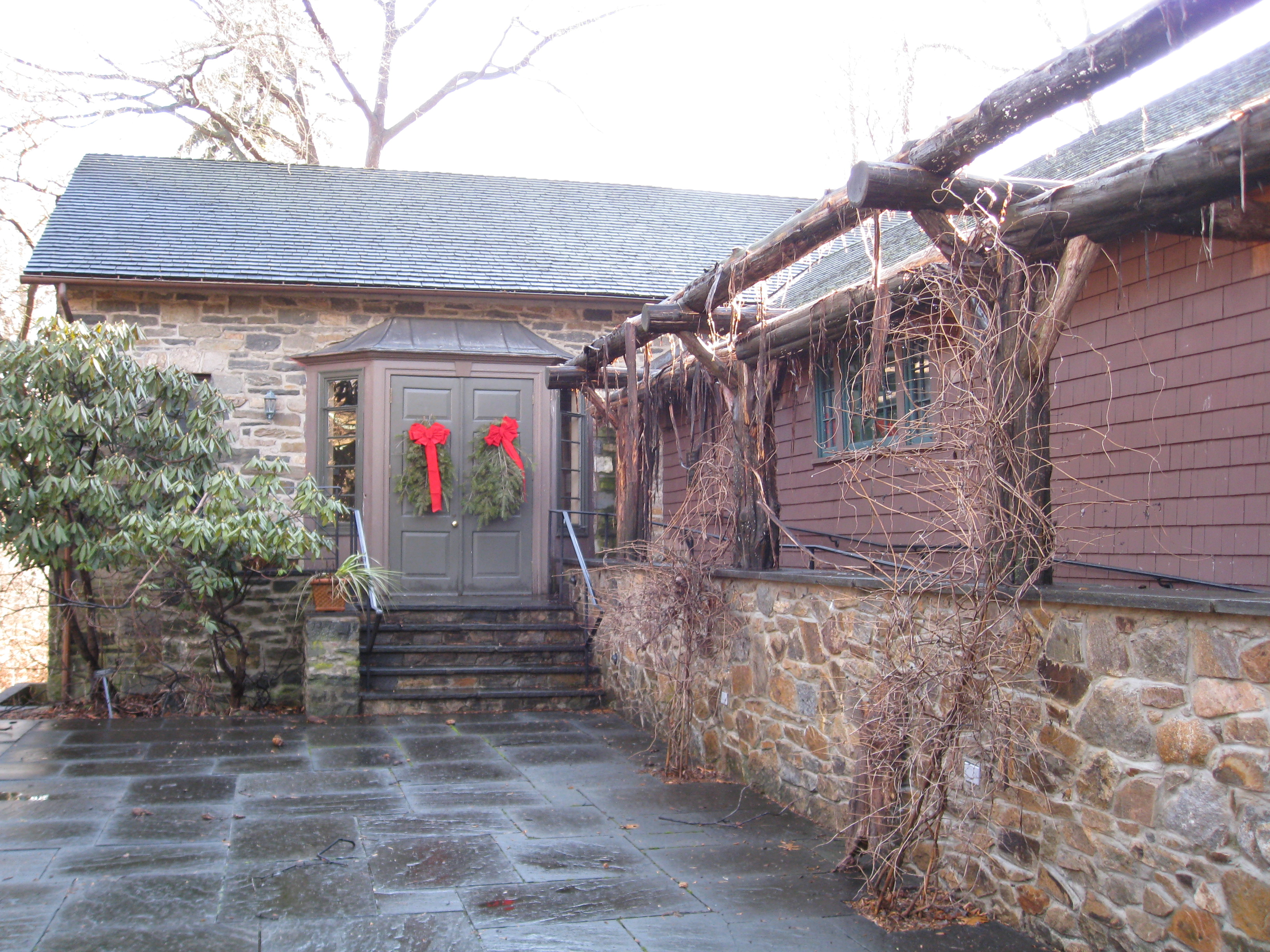
- Birdcraft Museum
- Formation: 1898
- Type: Non-profit organization
- Purpose: Conserving Connecticut’s environment through science-based education and advocacy focused on the state’s bird populations and habitats
- Headquarters: Fairfield, Connecticut
- Region served: Connecticut
- Executive Director: Joyce Leiz
- Main organ: Board of Directors
- Website: ctaudubon.org

The Connecticut Audubon Society, founded in 1898 and headquartered in Fairfield, Connecticut, is a nonprofit organization dedicated to "conserving Connecticut’s environment through science-based education and advocacy focused on the state’s bird populations and habitats." Connecticut Audubon Society is independent of the National Audubon Society (NAS), just as in the neighboring state of Massachusetts, where Massachusetts Audubon Society is independent of the NAS.

The Society operates nature education facilities in Fairfield, Milford, Pomfret, Old Lyme, and Sherman, and manages an additional 22 wildlife sanctuaries around the state, protecting over 3,400 acres of open space.

The Society uses science and advocacy to help protect the state's birds and their environment. The organization's Environmental Advocacy program is operated in Hartford, the state's capitol. The Society's scientists, citizen scientists, and volunteers monitor birds and their habitats around the state. Each year the Society publishes a report, titled Connecticut State of the Birds, that discusses the impact of habitat loss and other issues on local bird populations.

The Society also operates an EcoTravel office in Essex, Connecticut for bird watching trips around the state and the world.

== Centers ==
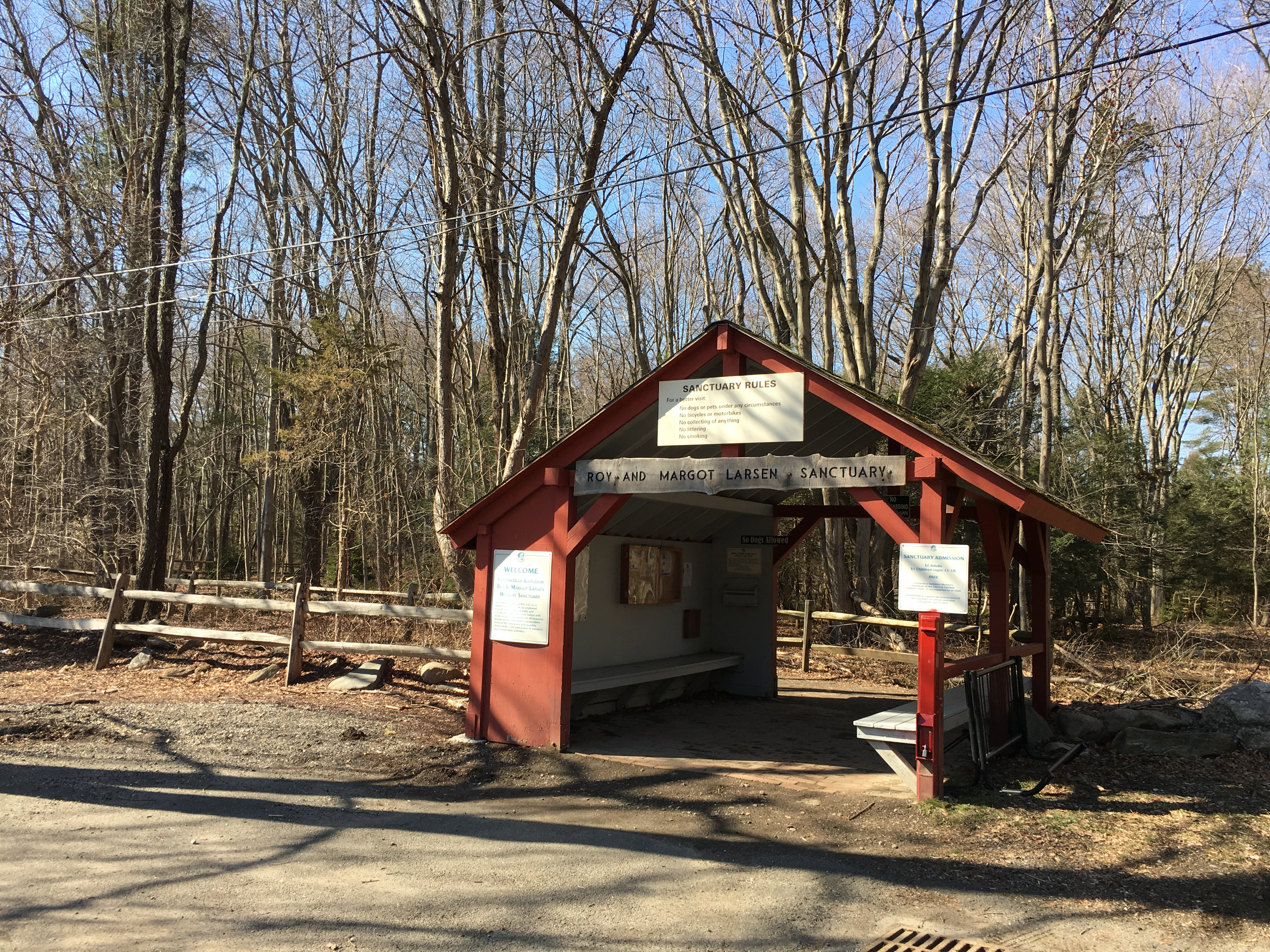
Connecticut Audubon Society Center at Fairfield - entrance to the Roy and Margot Larsen Wildlife Sanctuary

The Society's six centers feature education buildings, wildlife sanctuaries and trails on their properties, which are open to the public.

- Birdcraft Museum and Sanctuary - (6 acres), established in 1914 by Mabel Osgood Wright in Fairfield. It houses the Society's headquarters and a natural history museum (which is closed for renovation).
- Center at Fairfield - built in 1971, adjacent to the 155-acre Roy and Margot Larsen Wildlife with 7 miles of trails. It is the focus of environmental education programs and activities, and includes an outdoor birds of prey compound.
- Center at Milford Point - opened in 1995, located on the 8-acre Smith-Hubbell Wildlife Refuge and Bird Sanctuary on Long Island Sound in Milford, and includes a boardwalk, observation platform and 70-foot covered observation tower. It is situated next to the 840-acre Charles E. Wheeler Wildlife Management Area at the mouth of the Housatonic River.
- Deer Pond Farm, acquired through a gift in 2017, encompassed 835 acres, mostly in Sherman.
- The Roger Tory Peterson Estuary Center is dedicated to the conservation and preservation of the Connecticut River Estuary ecosystem and watershed.
- Center at Pomfret - opened in 2000, contains extensive grassland habitats and is situated on the 700-acre Bafflin Sanctuary in Pomfret.

== Other wildlife sanctuaries ==
Connecticut Audubon Society's other wildlife sanctuaries are open to the public unless noted.

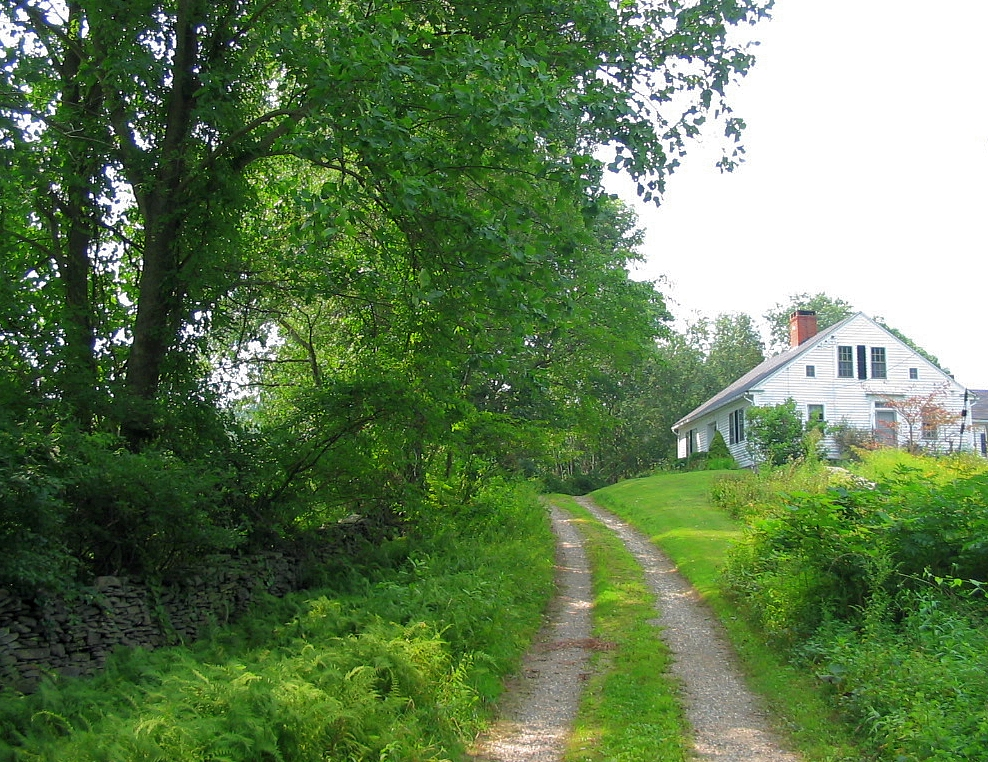
Trail Wood, home of naturalist Edwin Way Teale in Hampton, Connecticut

- Trail Wood - 168 acres, Hampton, former home of author and naturalist Edwin Way Teale
- Elsa Feiler Denburg Woodland Conservation Area - 10 acres, Fairfield, across the street from the Center at Fairfield
- Banks South Farm - 60 acres, Fairfield
- John W. Field and John Mahoney Sanctuary - 14 acres, Fairfield
- Grace Robinson Nature Sanctuary - 37 acres, Weston
- H. Smith Richardson Wildlife Preserve and Christmas Tree Farm - 74 acres, Westport, comprising a Christmas tree farm, field habitat, and evergreen plantation
- Edward Steichen Memorial Wildlife Preserve - 54 acres, Redding
- Richard G. Croft Memorial Preserve - 700 acres, Goshen
- Haddam Wildflower Gorge - 4 acres, adjacent to Hurd State Park, Haddam
- Harlo N. Haagenson Preserve - 65 acres, East Haddam
- Morgan R. Chaney Sanctuary - 233 acres, Montville
- Cromwell Meadows - 79 acres, Middletown, limited access
- Jane and George Pratt Valley Preserve - Bridgewater and New Milford, not open
- Hayes Meadow Tidal Marsh and N. B. Sargent Sanctuary - Fairfield, not open
- Wilcox Preserve - Stonington, not open
- Stratford Point - 28 acres, Stratford

== History ==
The Connecticut Audubon Society was founded in 1898 by Mabel Osgood Wright, Helen Glover, Theodora Wheeler, Harriet Glover, Lizzie Child and several other women who lived in Fairfield, with a mission of conserving birds and their environments in the State of Connecticut through science-based education and advocacy.

The Society's first sanctuary was created in 1914 in Fairfield through the donation of 10 acres of land by philanthropist Annie Burr Jennings, daughter of Oliver Burr Jennings. This property was the first-of-its-kind songbird refuge in the nation, and the museum at this sanctuary was listed on the National Register of Historic Places in 1982 and designated a National Historic Landmark in 1993.
