= Connecticut Audubon Society Coastal Center at Milford Point =

Coordinates: 41.1731°N 73.1101°W

The Connecticut Audubon Society Coastal Center at Milford Point is a nature center and bird sanctuary in Milford, Connecticut, established in 1995. Over 300 different species of bird have been observed at this location. The Coastal Center is located on an 8.4-acre (34,000 m^{2}) barrier beach—the Smith-Hubbell Wildlife Refuge & Bird Sanctuary—and is situated next to the 840-acre (3.4 km^{2}) Charles E. Wheeler Wildlife Management Area at the mouth of the Housatonic River. The Coastal Center provides easy access to Long Island Sound and its many habitats: tidal salt marshes, barrier beaches, tide pools and coastal dunes, and utilizes these habitats for environmental education for youth and adults. These various environments and habitats support a variety of bird, plant and animal communities for observation and study. The Coastal Center also contains educational exhibits and live animals.

The Coastal Center aims to promote awareness of Long Island Sound's ecosystem, the birds and habitats it supports and to foster their preservation, in keeping with the mission of the Connecticut Audubon Society.

The center is one of five nature centers and 19 wildlife sanctuaries operated by Connecticut Audubon Society, which is not part of the National Audubon Society.
