= Fairfield =

Fairfield may refer to:

== Places ==
=== Australia ===
- Fairfield, New South Wales, a western suburb of Sydney
  - Electoral district of Fairfield
  - Fairfield City Council,
  - Fairfield East
  - Fairfield West
  - Fairfield Heights
- Fairfield, Queensland
- Fairfield, Victoria
  - Fairfield railway station, Melbourne

=== Canada ===
- Fairfield, Greater Victoria, British Columbia
- Fairfield, New Brunswick

=== New Zealand ===
- Fairfield, Otago, a suburb of Dunedin
- Fairfield, Hamilton
- Fairfield, Lower Hutt, a suburb in the Hutt Valley

=== United Kingdom ===
- Fairfield, Bedfordshire, England
- Fairfield, Bury, Greater Manchester, England
- Fairfield, County Durham, England
- Fairfield, Derbyshire, England
- Fairfield, Tameside, a suburb of Droylsden, Greater Manchester, England
- Fairfield, Kent, England
- Fairfield, Liverpool, Merseyside, England
- Fairfield, Stogursey, Somerset, England, a historic house
- Fairfield, Worcestershire, England
- Fairfield, Evesham, Worcestershire, England
- Fairfield, Glasgow, Scotland
- Fairfield, Clackmannanshire, a location in Scotland
- Fairfield (Lake District), England, a mountain
- Fairfield (Croydon ward), London, an electoral ward
- Fairfield (Wandsworth ward), London, a former electoral ward

=== United States ===
- Fairfield, Alabama, in Jefferson County
- Fairfield, Covington County, Alabama
- Fairfield, California
- Fairfield, Connecticut
- Fairfield, Florida
- Fairfield, Idaho
- Fairfield, Illinois
- Fairfield, original name of Oakford, Indiana
- Fairfield, Franklin County, Indiana
- Fairfield, Iowa
- Fairfield, Kentucky
- Fairfield, Maine
  - Fairfield (CDP), Maine
- Fairfield, Michigan
- Fairfield, Minnesota
- Fairfield, Missouri
- Fairfield, Montana
- Fairfield, Nebraska
- Fairfield, New Jersey (disambiguation)
- Fairfield, New York
- Fairfield, North Carolina (disambiguation)
- Fairfield, North Dakota
- Fairfield, Ohio
- Fairfield, Oklahoma
- Fairfield, Pennsylvania
- Fairfield, Tennessee (disambiguation)
- Fairfield, Texas
- Fairfield, Harris County, Texas
- Fairfield, Utah
- Fairfield, Vermont
- Fairfield, Virginia (disambiguation)
- Fairfield, Washington
- Fairfield, Wisconsin, in Sauk County
- Fairfield (community), Wisconsin, in Rock County and Walworth County

== Businesses and organisations ==
=== Businesses ===
- Fairfield Enterprises, a former British machinery supplier
- Fairfield Geotechnologies, an American seismic service company
- Fairfield Greenwich Group, an American investment firm
- Fairfield Shipbuilding and Engineering Company, a former Scottish shipbuilder
- Fairfield Manufacturing, now part of Dana Incorporated, an American automotive manufacturer
- Bethlehem Fairfield Shipyard, a former shipyard in Baltimore, Maryland, US,

=== Educational institutions ===
- Fairfield Academy, Fairfield, New York, US
- Fairfield College, Hamilton, New Zealand
- Fairfield College Preparatory School, Fairfield, Connecticut, United States
- Fairfield Grammar School, Bristol, England
- Fairfield Methodist Schools, Dover, Singapore
- Fairfield Public School, Fairfield, Sydney, New South Wales, Australia
- Fairfield School, Dunedin, New Zealand
- Fairfield University, Fairfield, Connecticut, United States
  - Fairfield Stags, the athletic programs representing Fairfield University

== Other uses ==
- Fairfield (surname), including a list of people with the name
- Fairfield (typeface)
- HMS Fairfield, a Royal Navy Hunt-class minesweeper launched in 1919
- Fairfield (1825 ship)
- Fairfield F.C., a football team from Fairfield, Droylsden, Greater Manchester, England
- Fairfield F.C. (Scotland), a football team from Govan, Glasgow

== See also ==
- Fairfield Airport (disambiguation)
- Fairfield Historic District (disambiguation)
- Fairfield Hospital (disambiguation)
- Fairfield House (disambiguation)
- Fairfield Inn (disambiguation)
- Fairfield Plantation (disambiguation)
- Fairfield station (disambiguation)
- Fairfields, a civil parish in Milton Keynes, England
- Farfield, a boarding house at Gresham's school, Norfolk, England
- Fairfield Halls, in Croydon, London, England
- Fairfield Moravian Church, in Droylsden, Manchester, England
- Green Fairfield, a civil parish in Derbyshire, England
