= Fairfield train crash =

2013 crash in Connecticut, US

Fairfield/Bridgeport train crash
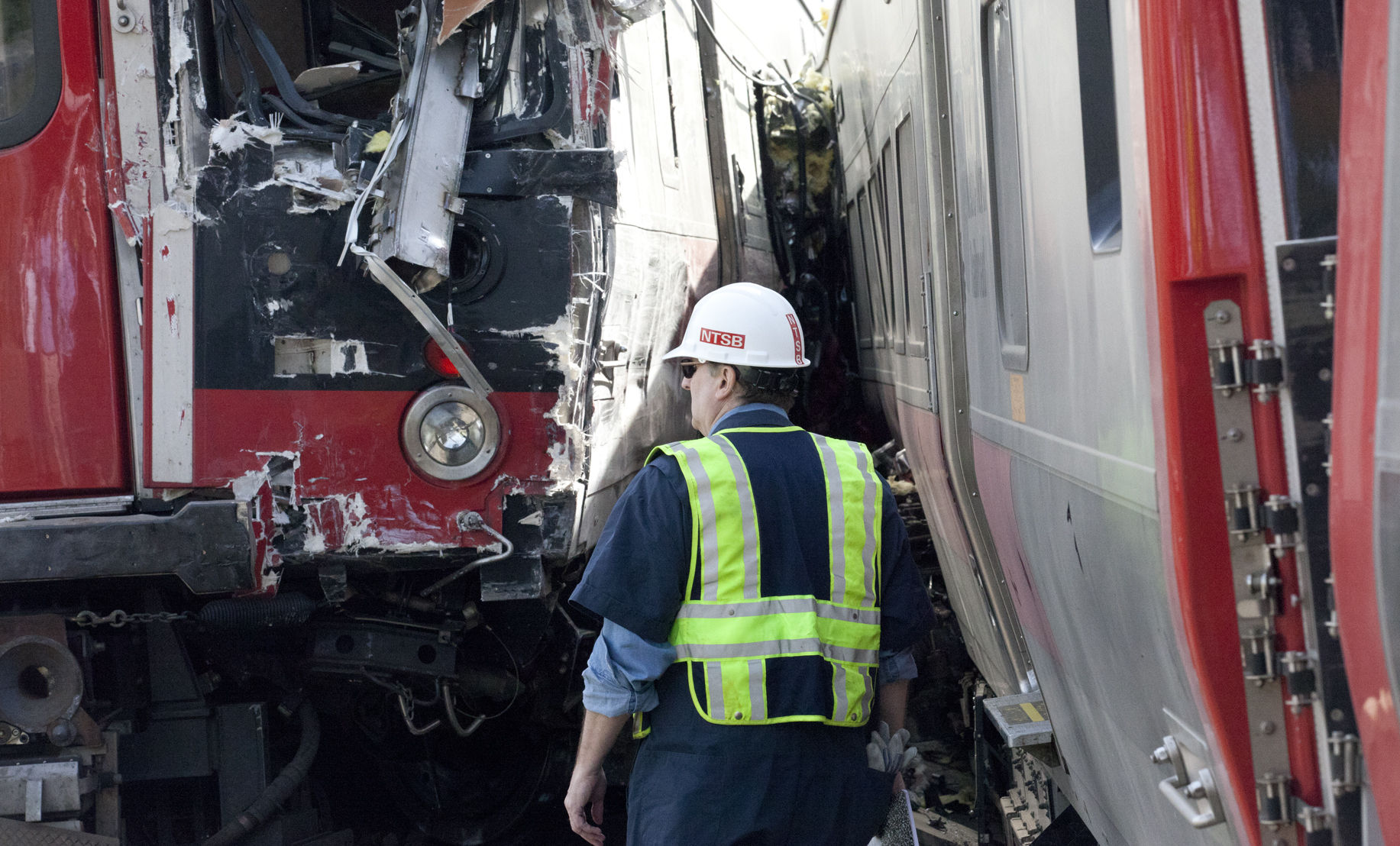

Details
- Date: May 17, 2013; 6:01 pm
- Location: Fairfield, Bridgeport, Connecticut
- Coordinates: 41°10′02.5″N 73°13′05″W
- Country: United States of America
- Line: New Haven Line
- Operator: Metro-North Railroad
- Incident type: Derailment and collision
- Cause: Broken joint bars

Statistics
- Trains: 2
- Passengers: approx. 500
- Deaths: 0
- Injured: 65
- Damage: $18.5 million

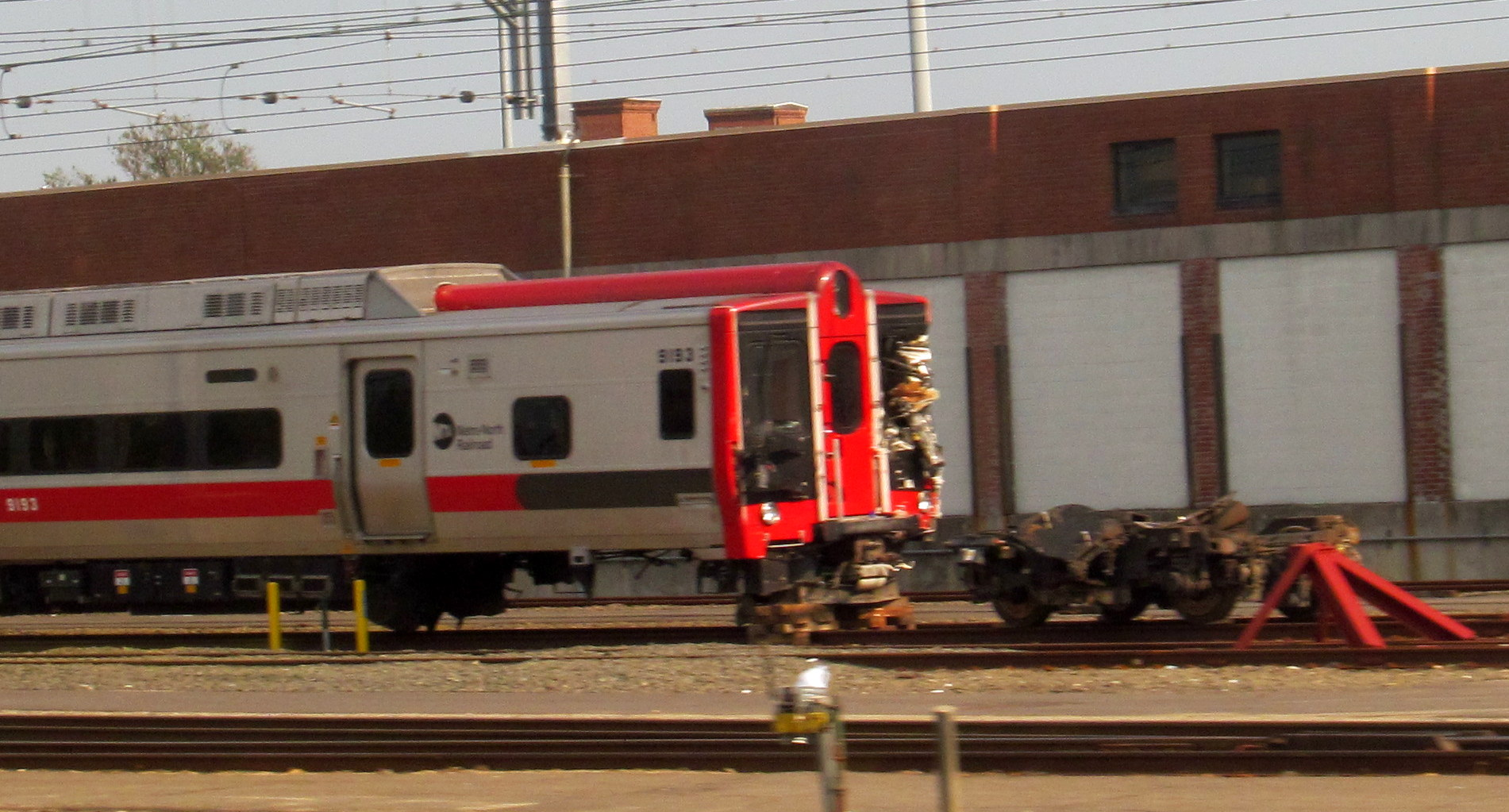
M8 cars damaged in the collision

The Fairfield/Bridgeport train crash occurred on May 17, 2013, when a Metro-North Railroad passenger train derailed between the Fairfield-Black Rock (then Fairfield Metro) and Bridgeport stations in Fairfield, Connecticut, in the United States. The derailed train fouled the adjacent line and a train heading in the opposite direction then collided with it. There were at least 65 injured among the approximately 250 people on board each of the two trains. Metro-North reported damages at $18.5 million.

== Crash ==
At 18:01 local time (22:01 UTC), a Metro-North Railroad passenger train from Grand Central Terminal, New York City to Union Station, New Haven, Connecticut derailed between the Fairfield Metro and Bridgeport stations. The derailed train, 8 cars, came to rest foul of the track used by trains traveling in the opposite direction and was hit by a train traveling on that track. The engineer of the second train applied emergency brakes and was able to slow from 70 mph to 23 mph before the collision occurred. Both of the involved trains consisted of Kawasaki M8 railcars, which first entered service in 2011 and were still being delivered at the time of the crash. There were about 250 people on each of the two trains. The crash blocked both tracks in use – two others were out of service for maintenance – resulting in Amtrak canceling its Northeast Corridor service between New York and Boston, Massachusetts. This was the first major crash on any of the MTA commuter rail systems in more than a decade, and it is also the first involving the M8 railcars.

=== Injuries ===
The injured were taken to hospitals in Bridgeport, Connecticut. St. Vincent Medical Center reported 46 people were treated there, with six being admitted in stable condition. Bridgeport Hospital said 26 people were treated there, of whom three were admitted, two in critical condition and one in stable condition. As of the morning of May 19, nine people still were hospitalized, with one in critical condition. The NTSB report states that there were 65 injuries, of which 53 were minor and 12 serious.

=== Cleanup ===
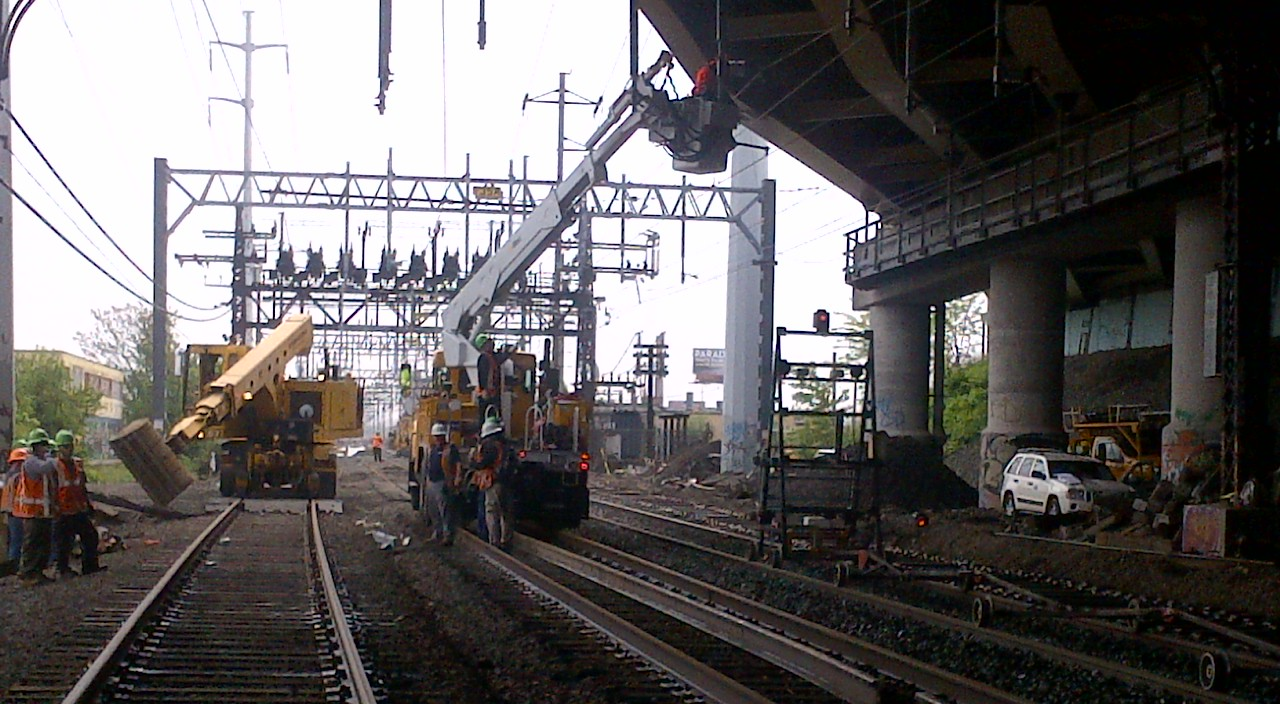
Metro-North crews work to rebuild tracks

As of 8 a.m. May 19, thirteen cars had been removed and the remaining three were expected to be removed by the early afternoon. By 4 p.m., all the cars were removed, and were moved to the Metro-North rail yard in Bridgeport.

=== Effect on regional transportation ===
Amtrak service between New York and Boston was suspended indefinitely, and Metro-North service also experienced problems. There was no train service at the Fairfield-Metro, Fairfield, or Southport stations on Monday, May 20. A bus link transported those that would have taken the train to Westport, where a limited westward service was scheduled for the morning and eastward from Westport in the evening. A shuttle train was put into service to run about every 20 minutes between New Haven and Bridgeport as well as an express bus shuttle service from Bridgeport to Stamford, and regular train connections to Grand Central Terminal. A limited number of Metro-North and Amtrak trains began to run between New York and New Haven during the afternoon of Tuesday, May 21. Full service resumed on Wednesday, May 22.

== Investigation ==
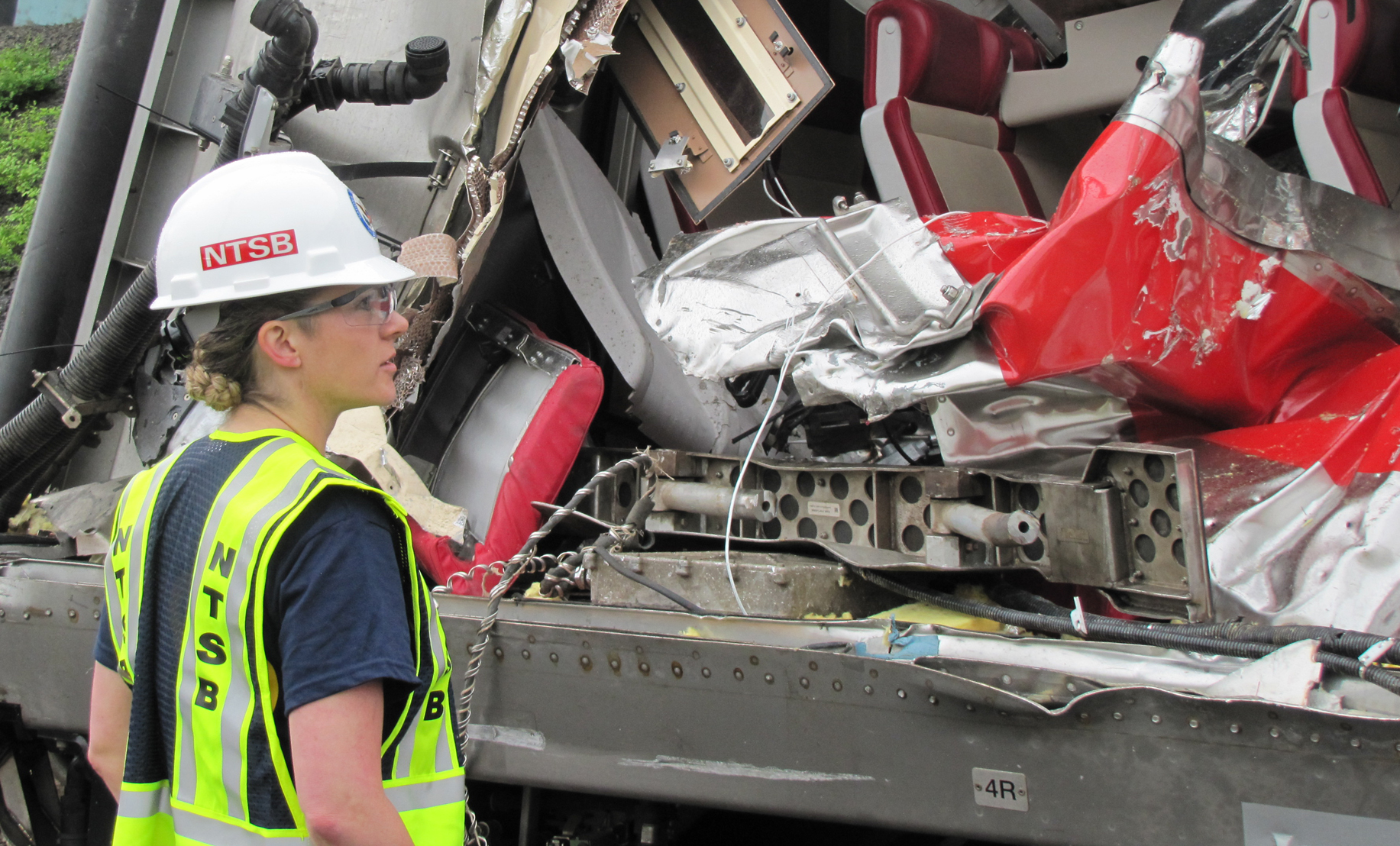
NTSB staff inspects wreckage

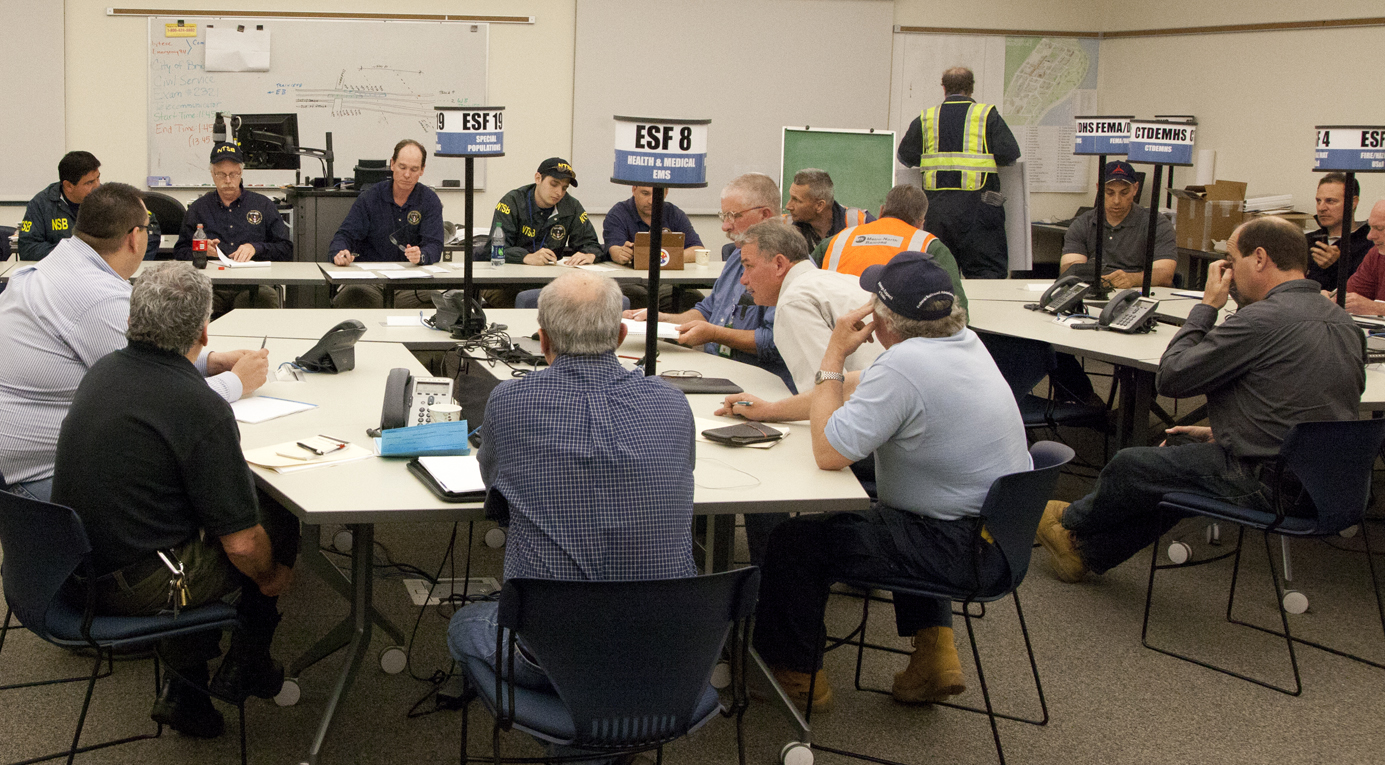
NTSB investigation team meets with experts in Fairfield

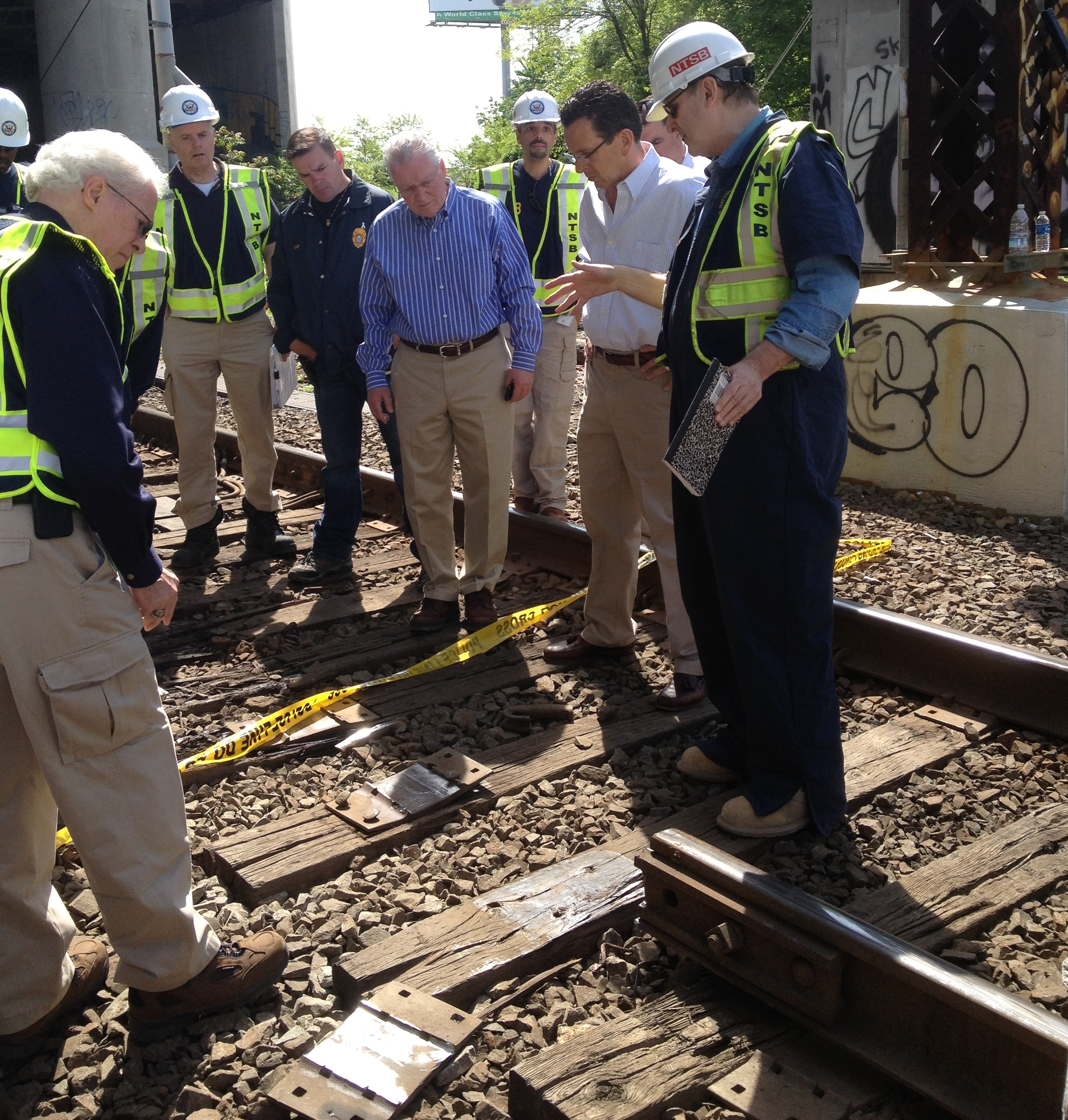
NTSB investigators at the scene of the crash with Connecticut governor Dannel Malloy on May 18

An investigation was opened by the National Transportation Safety Board (NTSB). A broken rail was under initial investigation as a potential cause of the crash, although it may also have been damaged during the crash sequence. The NTSB sent a portion of the track to a laboratory for analysis of a fracture and foul play was ruled out. The total investigation may take up to ten days. About 2,000 feet (610 m) of track was damaged, along with wires and signals.

An inspection two days before the crash revealed vertical movement of the track system around an insulated rail joint due to insufficient ballast. Metro North said that this problem was deemed not serious enough to require immediate repair. In April, a cracked joint bar was repaired in the same area of track.

The final NTSB report was issued on October 28, 2014. It states that the cause was broken compromise joint bars (used to join two different sizes of rail). The joint bars, in this case, were found to have fractured and broken causing the rail joint to break completely and causing the derailment. It was also discovered that inspections of the area had noticed in the days before the crash that there was insufficient ballast under the joint area causing the joint to flex repeatedly as well as an excessive mismatch in railhead height. This combination caused the failure from fatigue cracking.

The report also points out that Metro-North's inspection procedures were somewhat insufficient, in that inspections were performed from a hi-rail vehicle traveling on a center track, while the inspectors had to examine four tracks at once. From the inspector's point of view, they would be unable to see all parts of the track due to distance issues. There were also issues with inspections being rushed to prevent delaying trains and deferred maintenance.
