= Fairfield station =

Fairfield station or Fairfield railway station may refer to:

- Fairfield station (Metro-North), in Connecticut, United States
- Fairfield railway station (England), in Tameside, Greater Manchester
- Fairfield railway station, Brisbane, in Queensland, Australia
- Fairfield railway station, Melbourne, in Victoria, Australia
- Fairfield railway station, Sydney, in New South Wales, Australia
- Fairfield–Black Rock station, in Connecticut, United States
- Fairfield–Vacaville station, in California, United States
- Suisun–Fairfield station, in California, United States

== See also ==
- Fairfield (disambiguation)
