= Fairfield (surname) =

Fairfield is a surname. Notable people with the surname include:

- April Fairfield (fl. from 1996), North Dakota State Senate
- Don Fairfield (born 1929), American golfer
- Edmund Burke Fairfield (1821–1904), American minister, educator and politician
- John Fairfield (1797–1847), American attorney and politician
- John Fairfield (abolitionist) (died c. 1861), American abolitionist and member of the Underground Railroad
- Letitia Fairfield (1885–1978), English doctor, lawyer and war-worker
- Priscilla Fairfield Bok (1896–1975), American astronomer, astronomer
- William Fairfield (c. 1769 – 1816), Canadian businessman and political figure
- William Fairfield (Massachusetts politician) (1662–1742), American politician

== See also ==
- Senator Fairfield (disambiguation)
