= Green's Farms station =

Metro-North Railroad station in Connecticut

Green's Farms
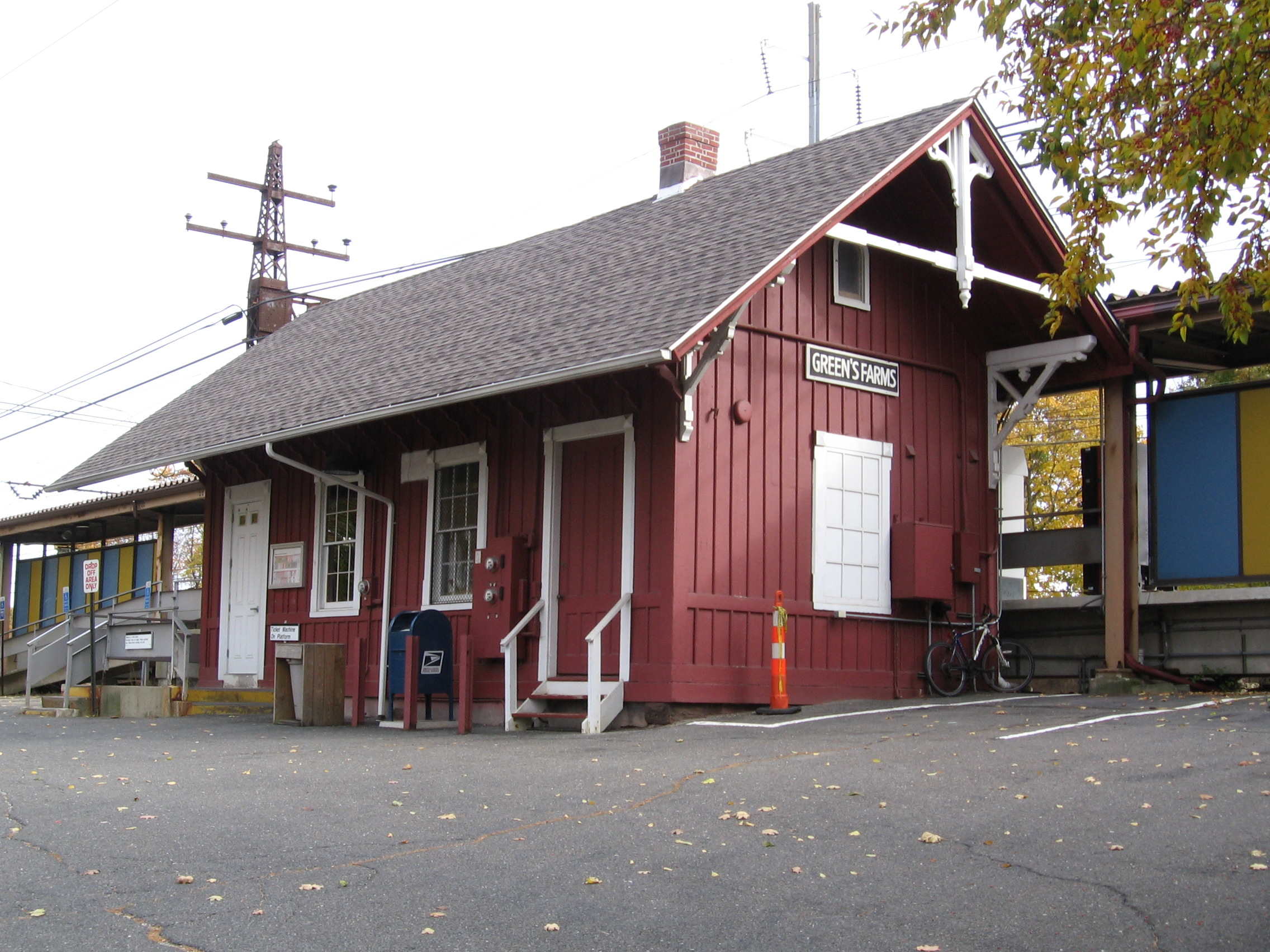
- The Green's Farms station building in November 2007

General information
- Location: 2 Post Office Lane; Westport, Connecticut
- Coordinates: 41.123316°N 73.315415°W
- Owner: ConnDOT
- Line: ConnDOT New Haven Line (Northeast Corridor)
- Platforms: 2 side platforms
- Tracks: 4
- Connections: Norwalk Transit District: G1, G2, Nyla Farms Shuttle

Construction
- Parking: 466 spaces
- Cycle facilities: Yes; bike racks

Other information
- Fare zone: 18

Passengers
- 2018: 846 daily boardings

Services
Preceding station	Metro-North Railroad	Following station
Westport toward Grand Central	New Haven Line	Southport toward New Haven or New Haven State Street
Former services
Preceding station	New York, New Haven and Hartford Railroad	Following station
Westport & Saugatuck toward New York	Main Line	Southport toward New Haven
Location

Green's Farms station is a commuter rail stop on the Metro-North Railroad's New Haven Line, located in Westport, Connecticut.

== Station layout ==
The station has two high-level side platforms, each six cars long, serving the outer tracks of the four-track Northeast Corridor. The station has 466 parking spaces, all owned by the state. Interstate 95 borders the parking lots to the north of the station on either side of New Creek Road.

Like other station houses on the New Haven Line, the one at Green's Farms is on the north side of the tracks, just east of New Creek Road, which runs beneath a railroad bridge. Access to the south side of the tracks is down a wooden staircase, under the railroad bridge at New Creek Road, and up another wooden staircase. Part of the platform near the station house is covered, and on the east end of the north platform another, rusty metal canopy covers a small area. A ticket machine is on the north platform near the station house. Bicycle stands are located to the east of the station house.
