= Metro-North train crash =

There are three events that may be referred to as the Metro-North train crash:

- Fairfield train crash, May 2013 – train derailed and collided with another train
- Spuyten Duyvil derailment, December 2013 – train derailed, tipped over, and fatally crashed
- Valhalla train crash, February 2015 – train collided with car at crossing and fatally crashed
