= Fairfield High School =

Fairfield High School may refer to:

== Australia ==
- Fairfield High School (New South Wales)

== United Kingdom ==
- Fairfield High School, Bristol, England
- Fairfield High School, Peterchurch, England
- Fairfield High School for Girls, Droylsden, Manchester, England
- Fairfield High School, Widnes, Cheshire, England

== United States ==
- Fairfield High Preparatory School, Fairfield, Alabama
- Fairfield High School (California), Fairfield, California
- Fairfield Community High School, in Fairfield, Illinois
- Fairfield Junior-Senior High School, Goshen, Indiana
- Fairfield High School, Fairfield Community School District, Fairfield, Iowa
- Fairfield High School, Fairfield USD 310, Langdon, Kansas
- Fairfield High School (Leesburg, Ohio)
- Fairfield High School (Fairfield, Ohio)
- Fairfield High School (Texas), Fairfield, Texas
- Fairfield Warde High School, formerly Fairfield High School, in Fairfield, Connecticut
- Fairfield Ludlowe High School, split off from Fairfield Warde, in Fairfield, Connecticut

== See also ==
- Fairfield (disambiguation)
- Fairfield Christian Academy, in Lancaster, Ohio, US
- Fairfield Union High School, in Lancaster, Ohio
