= Fairfield Block =

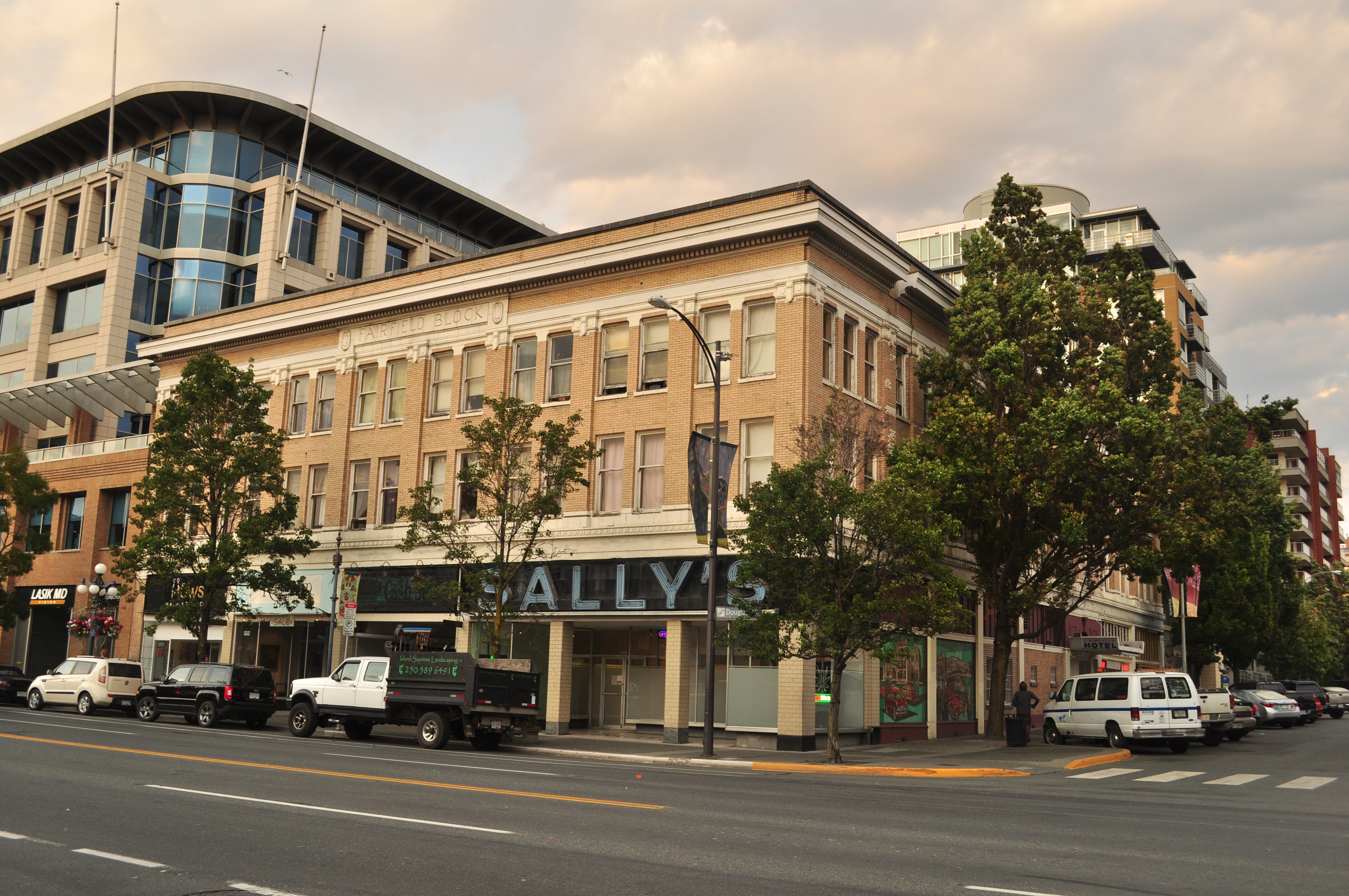
- The building's exterior in 2015
- Interactive map of the Fairfield Block area

General information
- Location: 1601 Douglas Street, Victoria, British Columbia, Canada
- Coordinates: 48.4288°N 123.3641°W
- Completed: 1912

Technical details
- Floor count: 3

Fairfield Block is a historic building in Victoria, British Columbia, Canada. It was completed in 1912 and has a total of three floors. Designed by architect Henry Sandham Griffith, the building is a notable example of Edwardian commercial architecture. Over the years, it has housed various businesses, including the popular Sally's clothing store in the 1950s and 1960s.

== See also ==
- List of historic places in Victoria, British Columbia
- Chinatown, Victoria
- Fairfield, Greater Victoria
