= Southport station (Metro-North) =

Metro-North Railroad station in Connecticut

Southport
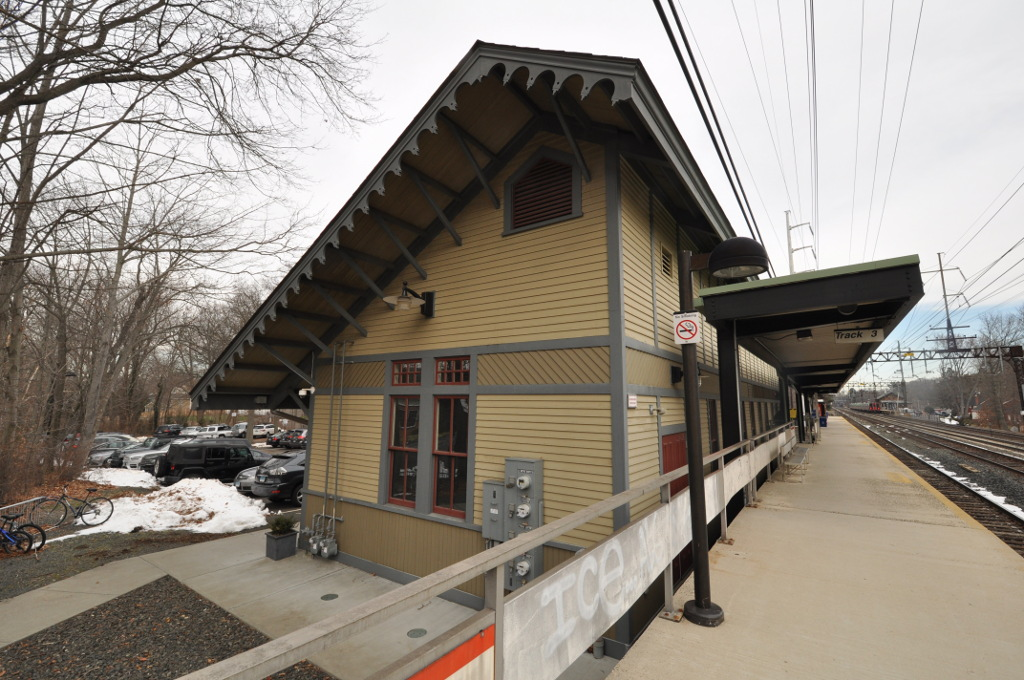
- The westbound station building in 2016

General information
- Location: 96 Station Street (eastbound); 100 Center Street (westbound); Southport, Connecticut
- Coordinates: 41.13589°N 73.28898°W
- Owner: Connecticut DOT; leased to Town of Fairfield
- Line: ConnDOT New Haven Line (Northeast Corridor)
- Platforms: 2 side platforms
- Tracks: 4
- Connections: GBTA: Coastal Link

Construction
- Parking: 179 spaces

Other information
- Fare zone: 18

History
- Opened: December 25, 1848
- Rebuilt: 1884, January 2008–February 2009

Passengers
- 2018: 358 daily boardings

Services
Preceding station	Metro-North Railroad	Following station
Green's Farms toward Grand Central	New Haven Line	Fairfield toward New Haven or New Haven State Street
Former services
Preceding station	New York, New Haven and Hartford Railroad	Following station
Green's Farms toward New York	Main Line	Fairfield toward New Haven
- Southport Railroad Stations
- U.S. National Register of Historic Places
- Built: 1884
- Architectural style: Stick/Eastlake
- NRHP reference No.: 89000927
- Added to NRHP: July 28, 1989
Location

Southport station is a commuter rail station on the Metro-North Railroad's New Haven Line, located in Southport, Connecticut. It is one of three railroad stations in the town of Fairfield, the others being Fairfield and Fairfield–Black Rock.

== History ==
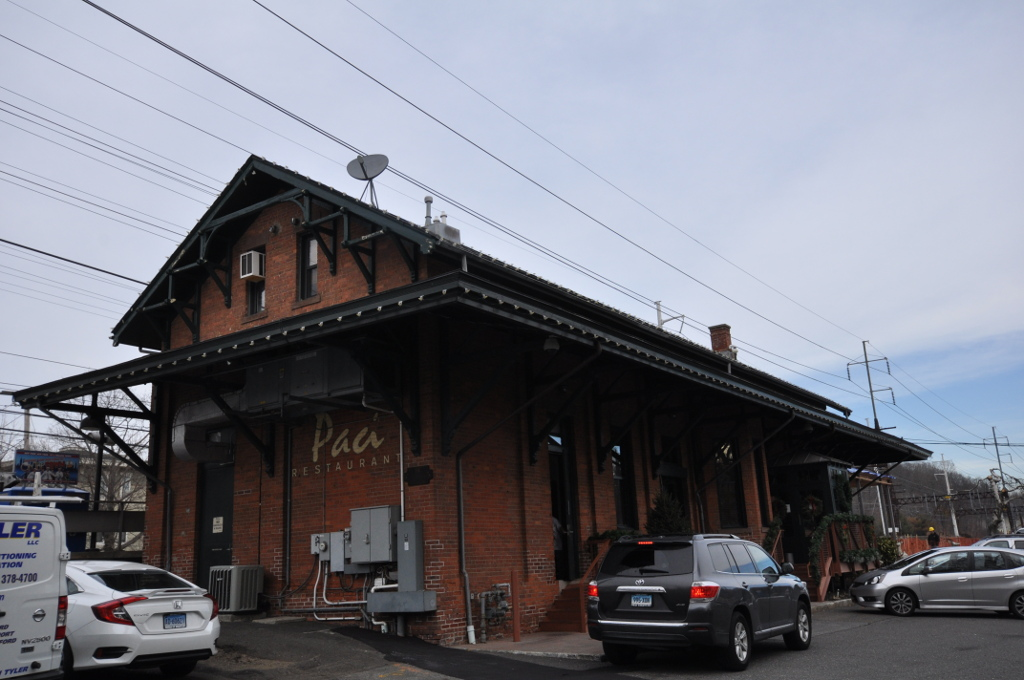
The former eastbound station in 2016

The station was opened in 1884, and the existing westbound and eastbound station buildings were constructed in the late 19th century by the New York, New Haven, and Hartford Railroad. The westbound building is wooden, built in the saltbox-style. The eastbound building is made of brick, and is no longer in railroad use. Instead, it houses a restaurant. The station agent was eliminated on January 15, 1972. In 1989, the station buildings were listed in the National Register of Historic Places as the Southport Railroad Stations.

The westbound station house, one of the few remaining original station houses on the New Haven Line, was gutted by a fire on January 4, 2008. The building housed both an art gallery and a passenger waiting area prior to fire. The majority of the artwork was saved. Most of the damage done to the building during the fire was caused by the water that was being used to extinguish the fire. It was predicted that the building would have to be entirely replaced, but it was decided instead to refurbish it after the damage was assessed to be less severe than originally thought. The refurbishment cost $3 million. A temporary waiting room was created for passengers at the station. The refurbishment was finished by the beginning of the next year, and was officially re-opened by then-governor Jodi Rell in February 2009.

== Station layout ==
The station has two offset high-level side platforms, each four cars long, serving the outer tracks of the four-track Northeast Corridor. It has 179 parking spaces, of which 99 are owned by the state.

== See also ==
- National Register of Historic Places listings in Fairfield County, Connecticut
