= East Norwalk station =

Metro-North Railroad station in Connecticut

East Norwalk
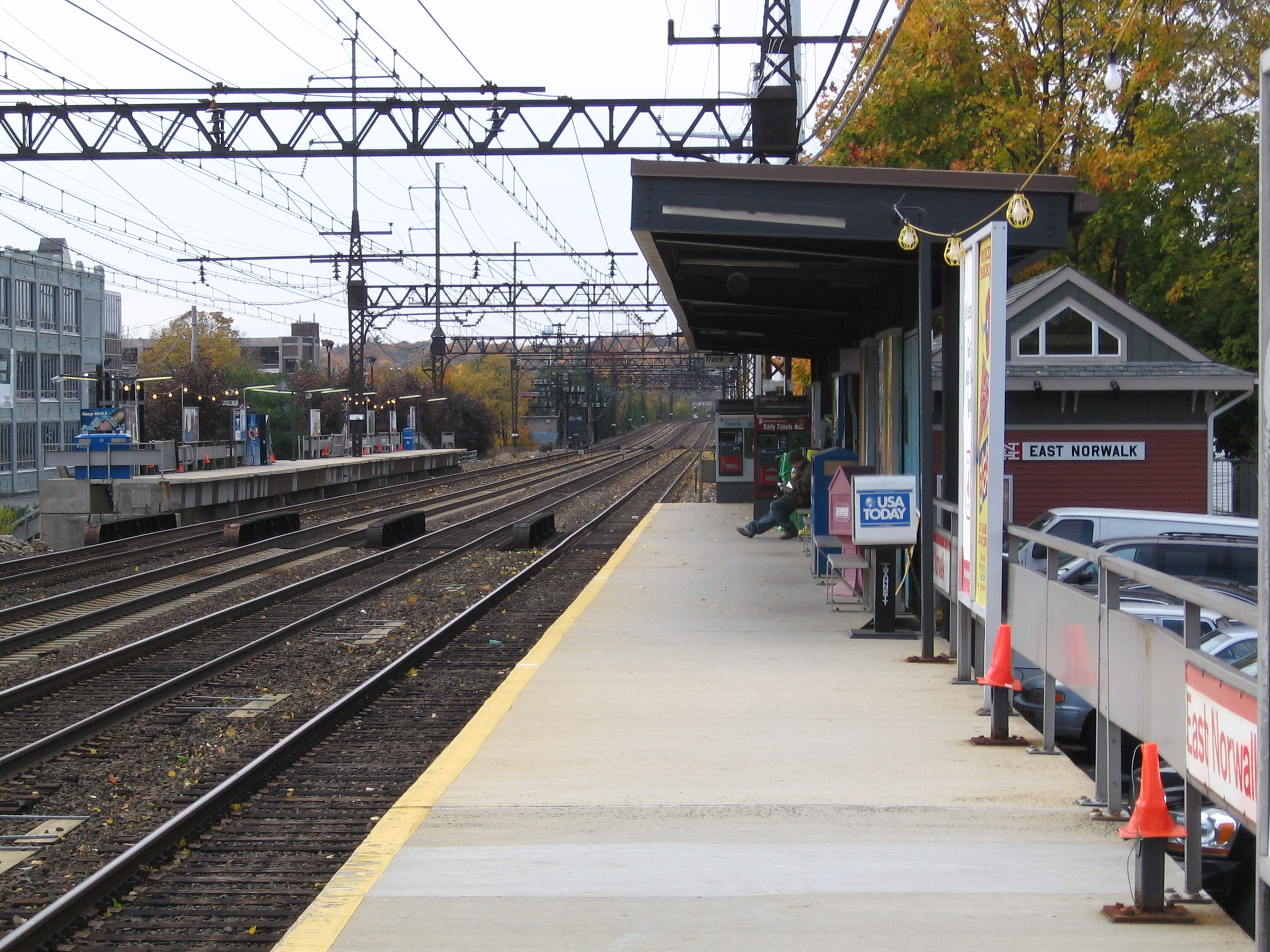
- East Norwalk station in November 2007

General information
- Location: 281 East Avenue; Norwalk, Connecticut
- Coordinates: 41.10400°N 73.40450°W
- Owner: ConnDOT
- Line: ConnDOT New Haven Line (Northeast Corridor)
- Platforms: 2 side platforms
- Tracks: 4
- Connections: Norwalk Transit District: 8, 11

Construction
- Parking: 231 spaces

Other information
- Fare zone: 17

Passengers
- 2018: 726 daily boardings

Services
Preceding station	Metro-North Railroad	Following station
South Norwalk toward Grand Central	New Haven Line	Westport toward New Haven or New Haven State Street
Former services
Preceding station	New York, New Haven and Hartford Railroad	Following station
Norwalk and South Norwalk toward New York	Main Line	Westport & Saugatuck toward New Haven
Location

East Norwalk station is a commuter rail station on the Metro-North Railroad New Haven Line, located in the East Norwalk neighborhood of Norwalk, Connecticut. The station building was constructed by Metro-North in the 1980s.

== Station layout ==
The station has two offset high-level side platforms, each four cars long, serving the outer tracks of the four-track Northeast Corridor. The platforms are offset, with the westbound platform west of East Street and the eastbound platform to the east.

The Founder's Stone Monument, which formerly located at East Avenue and Fitch Street, is adjacent to the station. It marks the earliest Norwalk settlement and adjacent first Meeting House (seat of government), which were located at its former site.

== History ==
East Norwalk station first opened in 1885 to serve the quickly growing East Norwalk neighborhood. The original station building was replaced c. 1897 by a smaller structure on the opposite side of the tracks. That station would continue to serve until c. 1939 when it was replaced by another structure across the tracks and subsequently removed. A separate westbound shelter was built some time around 1950, and both structures would serve until the current building was constructed by Metro-North in the 1980s.

The station was temporarily closed from August 17 to September 6, 2024, due to work on the Walk Bridge replacement project.
