= Senator Fairfield (disambiguation) =

John Fairfield (1797–1847) was a US Senator from Maine.

Senator Fairfield may also refer to:

- April Fairfield (fl. from 1996), North Dakota State Senate
- Edmund Burke Fairfield (1821–1904), Michigan State Senate
