= Westport station (Metro-North) =

Railroad station in Westport, Connecticut, US

Westport
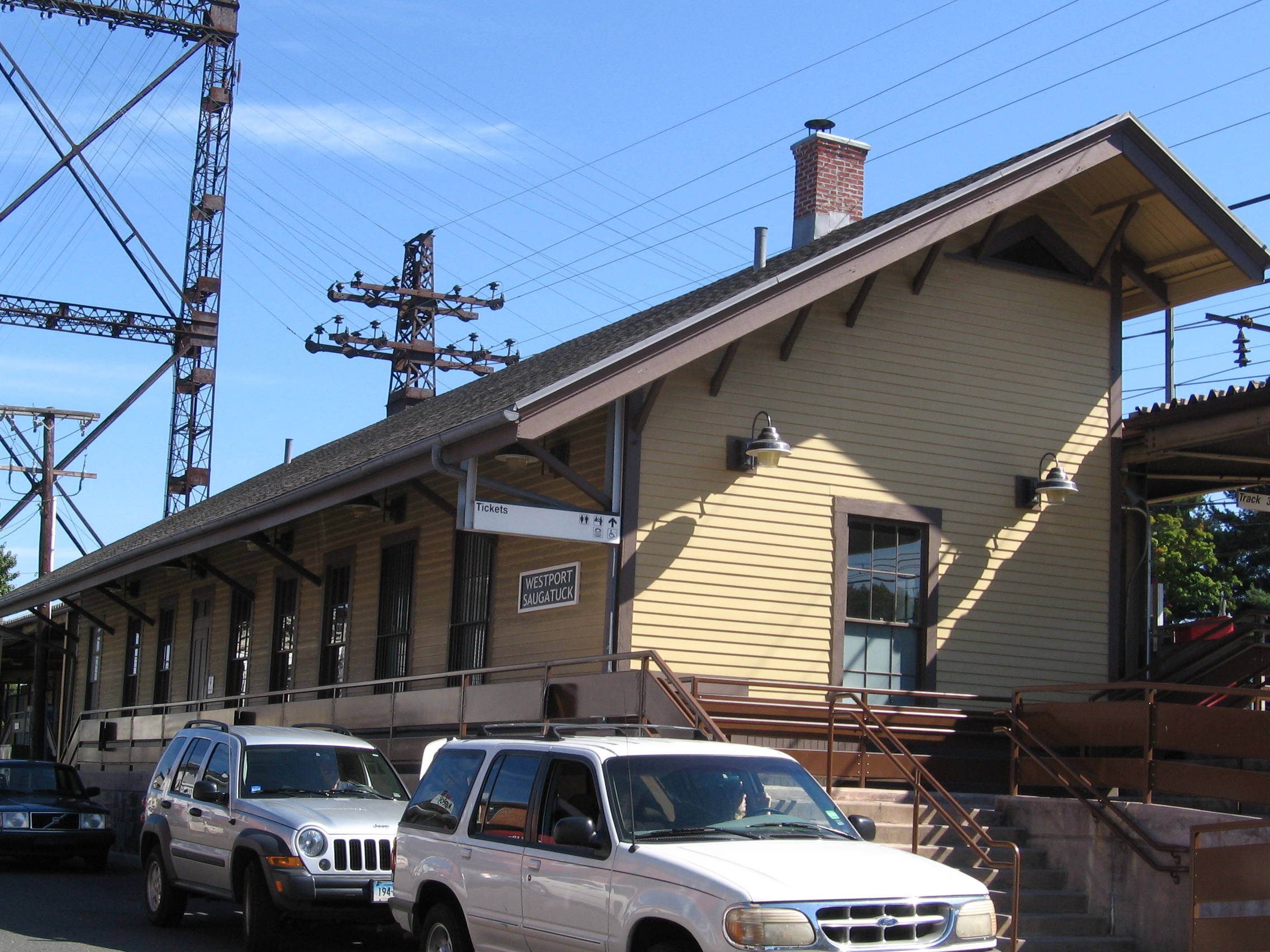
- Westport station in 2007

General information
- Location: 1 Railroad Place; Westport, Connecticut
- Coordinates: 41.119986°N 73.37142°W
- Owner: ConnDOT
- Line: ConnDOT New Haven Line (Northeast Corridor)
- Platforms: 2 side platforms
- Tracks: 4
- Connections: Norwalk Transit District: S1, S2, S3, S4, Imperial Avenue Shuttle, Nyla Farms Shuttle

Construction
- Parking: 1,454 spaces
- Accessible: Yes

Other information
- Fare zone: 18

History
- Opened: December 25, 1848

Passengers
- 2018: 2,625 daily boardings

Services
Preceding station	Metro-North Railroad	Following station
East Norwalk toward Grand Central	New Haven Line	Green's Farms toward New Haven or New Haven State Street
Former services
Preceding station	New York, New Haven and Hartford Railroad	Following station
East Norwalk toward New York	Main Line	Green's Farms toward New Haven
Location

Westport station (also known as Saugatuck station) is a commuter rail stop on the Metro-North Railroad's New Haven Line, located in Westport, Connecticut. It is located in the center of the Saugatuck section of town, a few miles south of downtown Westport, and is one of two stations serving Westport. The station was named Westport & Saugatuck in timetables of the New Haven Railroad and the early years of its corporate successor, Penn Central.

== Station layout ==
The station has two high-level side platforms serving the outer tracks of the four-track Northeast Corridor. The northern (New York-bound) platform is nine cars long, while the southern platform is ten cars long.

The station has 1,454 parking spaces, 1,126 of them owned by the state. The ticket office at the station was closed on July 7, 2010; tickets must be purchased from vending machines adjacent to the platforms.
