= Art Gallery of Greater Victoria =

Art museum in Victoria, Canada

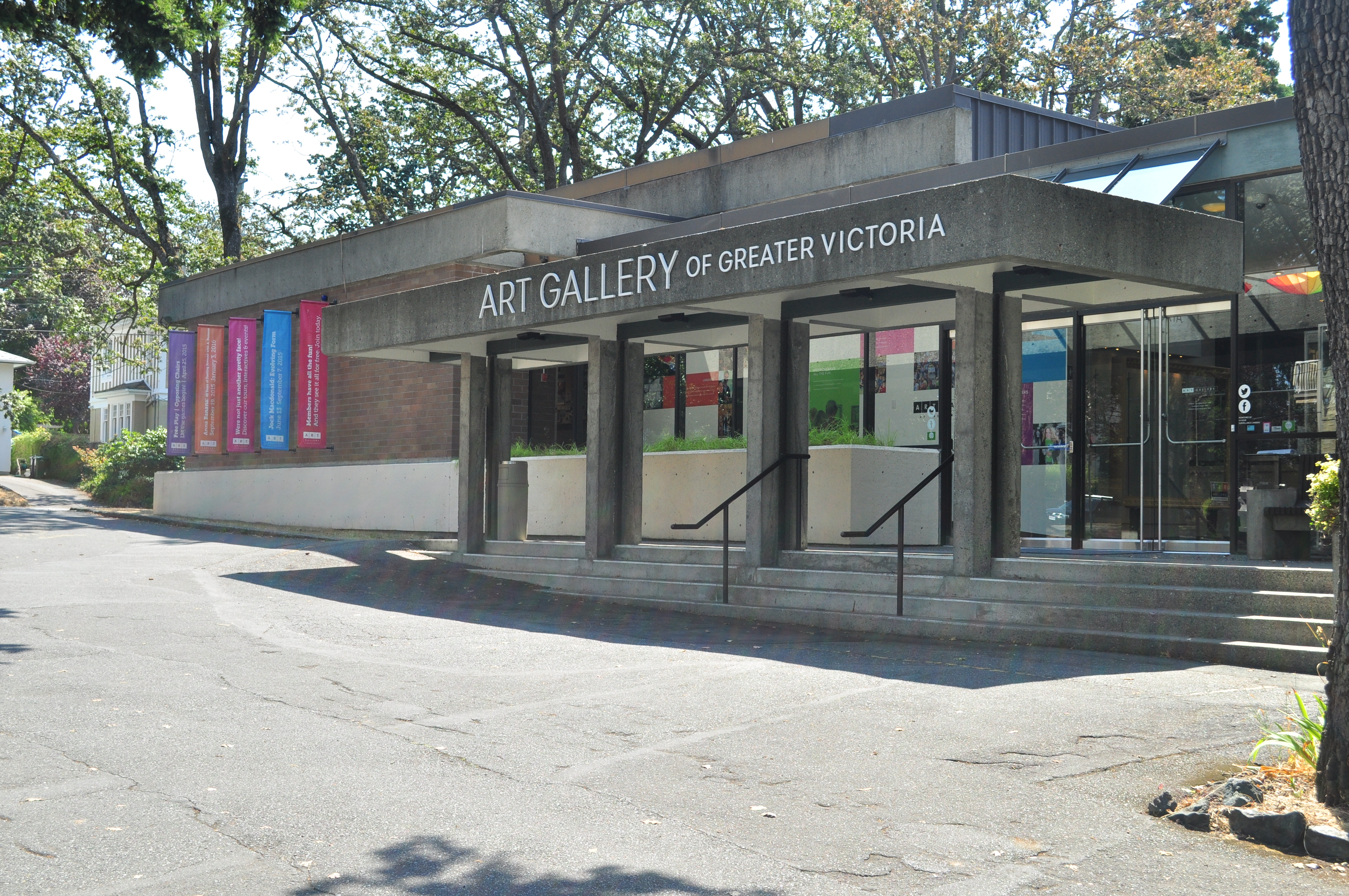
- Main entrance to the art gallery
- Established: 1946; 80 years ago
- Location: 1040 Moss Street, Victoria, British Columbia, V8V 4P1
- Coordinates: 48.4219°N 123.3476°W
- Type: Art museum
- Visitors: 54,998 (2015–16)
- Director: Nancy Noble
- Website: aggv.ca

The Art Gallery of Greater Victoria (AGGV) is an art museum located in Victoria, British Columbia, Canada. Situated in Rockland, Victoria, the museum occupies a 2,474.5-square-metre (26,635 sq ft) building complex; made up of the Spencer Mansion, and the Exhibition Galleries. The former building component was built in 1889, while the latter component was erected in the mid-20th century.

The institution was established in 1946 as the Little Centre in downtown Victoria. In 1951, the institution was gifted the Spencer Mansion in the neighbourhood of Rockland, and moved into the building in the same year. The institution was renamed the Art Gallery of Greater Victoria when it opened at the Spencer Mansion. From 1955 to 1978, the museum underwent a series of expansions to the building in order to expand the viewing space of its building.

Its collection works from Canadian artists, indigenous Canadian artists, and other artists from across the Pacific Rim. The museum has also organized and hosted a number of travelling arts exhibitions. The Art Gallery of Greater Victoria has the largest collection of works out of any art museum in British Columbia, with approximately 20,000 works in its permanent collection.

== History ==
The art museum was established by former members of the Vancouver Island branch of the Federation of Canadian Artists, and other members of the local arts community in 1946 as the Little Centre. The Little Centre operated at a former car dealership in downtown Victoria from 1946 to 1951. In 1951, the museum moved into the Spencer Mansion, which was donated to the institution in the same year by Sarah Spencer. The institution was renamed the Art Gallery of Greater Victoria when it reopened at the Spencer Mansion. While the building has been used as an art museum since 1951, it continued to serve as a residence for the building's caretakers through the 1960s.

Shortly after moving into the Spencer Mansion, the museum undertook a series of renovations and expansions, constructing an expansion wing known as the Exhibition Galleries. The Exhibition Galleries were built in several phases, with the first gallery in the building expansion opened in 1958, and the last opened in 1978.

In 2012, the museum announced it was looking for architects to design its expansion of the Exhibition Galleries. In 2015, the municipal government approved the expansion, which included an additional 1,000 square metres (11,000 sq ft) of exhibition space, as well as the construction of a new cafe, and lecture hall. Construction was originally planned to begin in late 2019, although rising materials and construction costs led to the development to be postponed. The museum plans to close its building during construction, and exhibit its collection at off-site locations throughout Victoria.

== Architecture ==
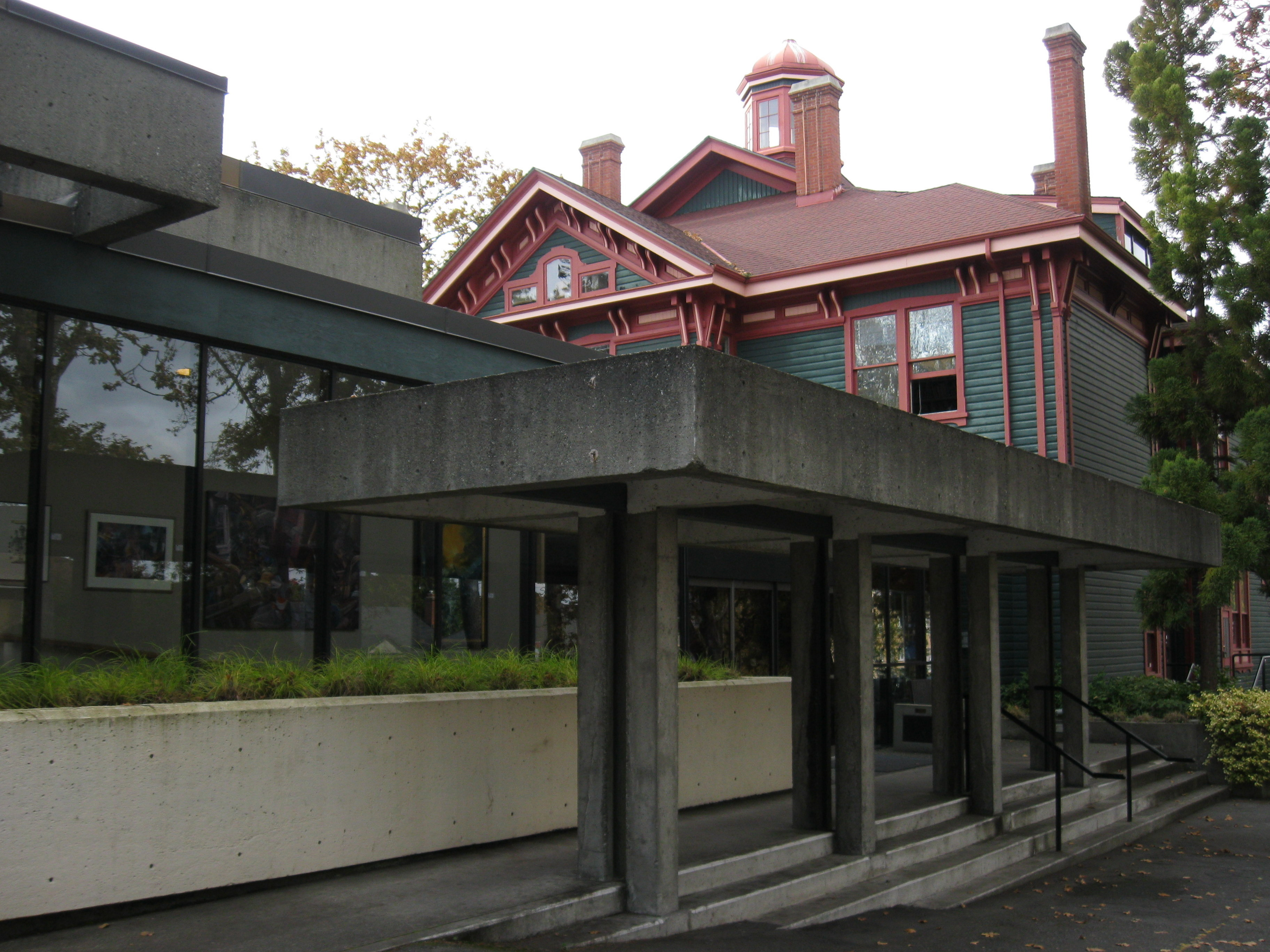
The museum's building is made up of two components, a late–19th century residence, and a mid–20th century expansion wing

The building of the Art Gallery of Greater Victoria is made up of two components, the Spencer Mansion, and the Exhibition Galleries. The former is a re-purposed Victorian style residence built in 1889, whereas the latter is a modernist style expansion wing of seven galleries, built in phases from the 1950s to 1978. The combined museum building takes up 2,474.5 square metres (26,635 sq ft) of space.

=== Spencer Mansion ===
The Spencer Mansion was built in 1889, and was designed by William Ridgeway Wilson. The Spencer Mansion was once a part of a larger property, originally stretching from Fort Street to Rockland Avenue; incorporating a garden, two tennis courts, stables and a coach house. The Spencer Mansion had a belvedere, with a view of the ocean. The Victorian era home was originally built for the Green family, who named the building Gyppeswyk, the Old English name for Ipswich. When Cary Castle, the original Government House, was destroyed by fire in 1903, Gyppeswyck served briefly as the residence of the Lieutenant Governor of British Columbia. The building was donated in 1951 by Sarah Spencer to the institution that became the Art Gallery of Greater Victoria.

The exterior of the building has been painted in several different colour schemes since its construction. In 1975 it was painted cream in order to coordinate with the brick used for one of the Exhibition Galleries. The building was re-painted back to its original colour scheme of dark red, dark green, and pale salmon in 2004. The original colour scheme was ascertained after peeling through the building's 15 layers of paint. The building's eastern facade, and portions of the northern facade were altered with the construction of the first galleries of the Exhibition Galleries during the 1950s.

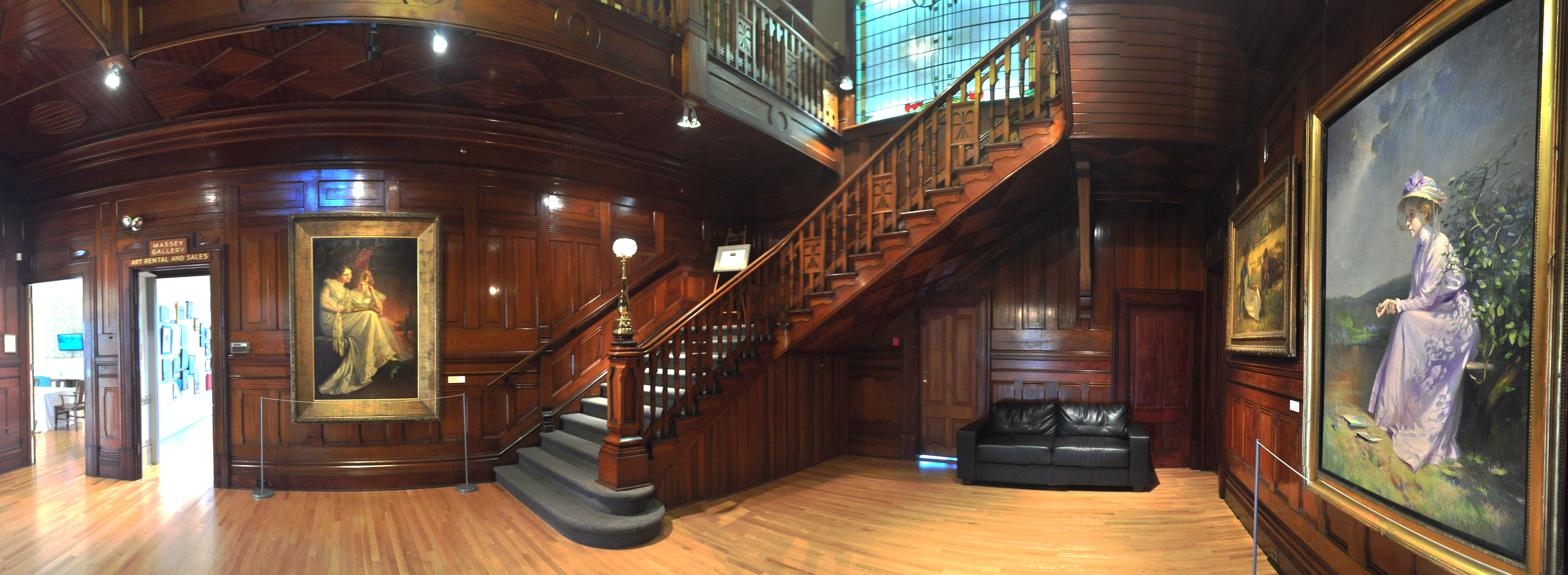
Works showcased in the Spencer Mansion, a historic building that forms a part of the building complex.

The interior of the building has undergone significant changes since its construction, either conducted by the museum, or by previous owners of the building. However, the building still retains a number of features from its original construction, including its original fireplace, ornate tiles and woodworking on the southeast corner of the second floor. In 2004, several renovation works undertaken on the building, including the reconstruction of the rooftop Palladian window, and providing a seismic retrofit to the building's chimney.

The first floor of the Spencer Mansion houses the museum's gift shop, and art rental and sales office. The former bedrooms on the second floor serve as the museum's offices, and library, while the museum's archives are located in the building's attic.

=== Exhibition Galleries ===
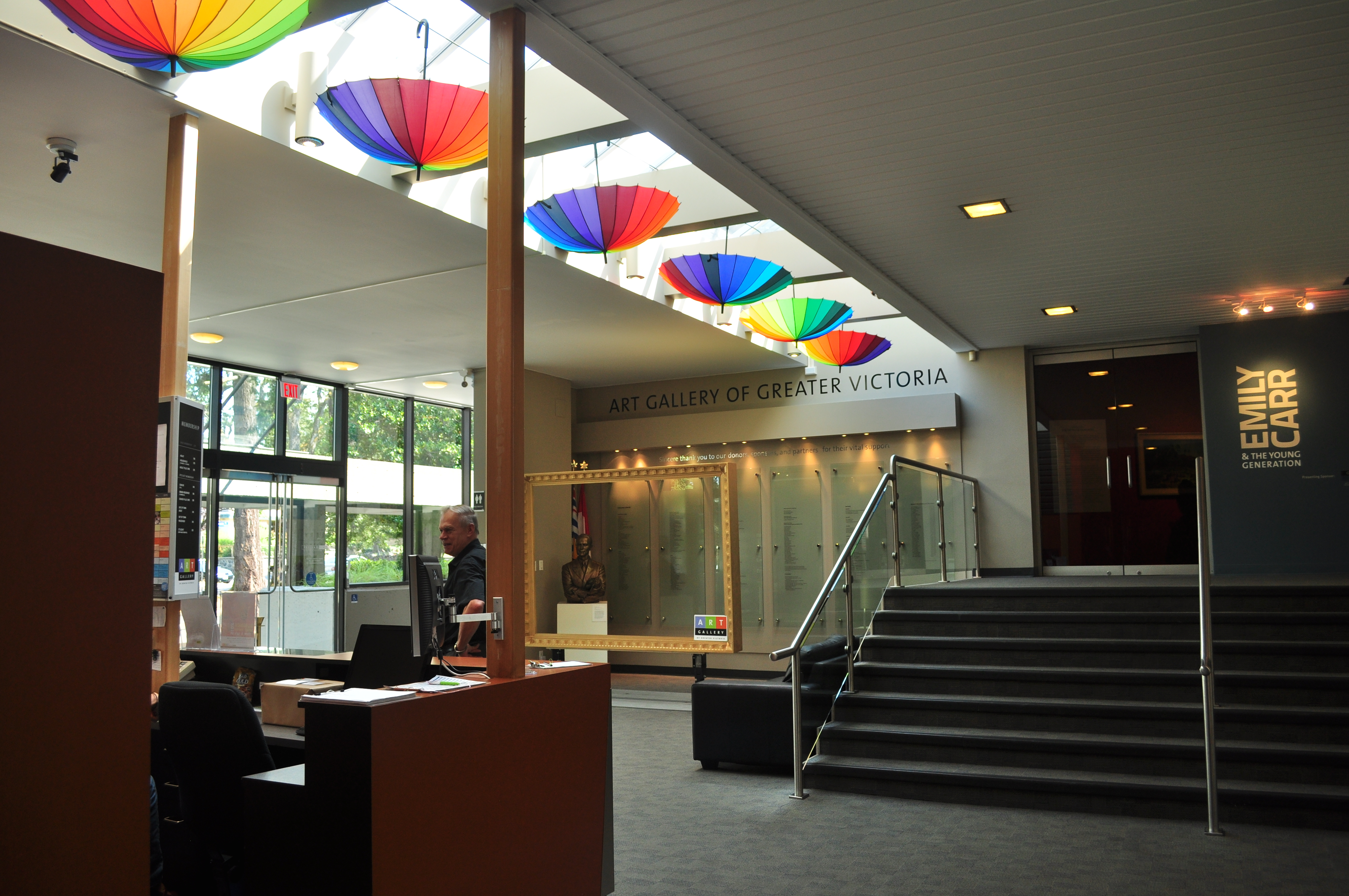
Main entrance lobby, located within the Exhibition Galleries

From 1955 to 1978, the museum expanded the building by constructing seven galleries in a modernist expansion wing adjacent to the eastern portion of the mansion, collectively known as the Exhibition Galleries. The first two fireproof galleries were opened in 1958 and 1959, and were known as the Centennial Galleries. Its namesake commemorates the centennial of the establishment of the Colony of British Columbia. The final renovations during this period occurred in 1978, which saw the renovation of two of its larger exhibition galleries, as well as repairs to the Spencer Mansion.

Renovations to the Exhibition Galleries were conducted from 2001 to 2003. Work on the Exhibition Galleries included the installation a new climate control system, enabling the museum to host travelling exhibitions that include works which need a climate controlled environment. Work on the museum's entrance at the Exhibition Galleries, and its corridors was also conducted during these renovations.

== Permanent collection ==
As of September 2019, the museum has approximately 20,000 works in its permanent collection, providing the institution with the largest collection of works of any art museum in British Columbia. However, because of the limited size of the museum building, only five per cent of the permanent collection is able to be exhibited in the museum's exhibition galleries. Its collection is divided into a number of departments including Asian art, Canadian art, contemporary art, decorative art, and indigenous Canadian art.

=== Asian art ===
The museum's collection of Asian art is made up of approximately 8,000 works, comprising 40 per cent of the museum's total collection. With approximately 8,000 Asian works, the museum holds the second largest collection of Asian art in Canada, after the Royal Ontario Museum. While the collection of Asian works includes items from all over Asia (including South Asia, and Western Asia), the focus of the Asian collection is primarily on works from China, and Japan. The museum's collection of Chinese works is believed to have increased significantly in value in the first decades of the 21st century, due to China's economic growth, and renewed interests for art from that region.

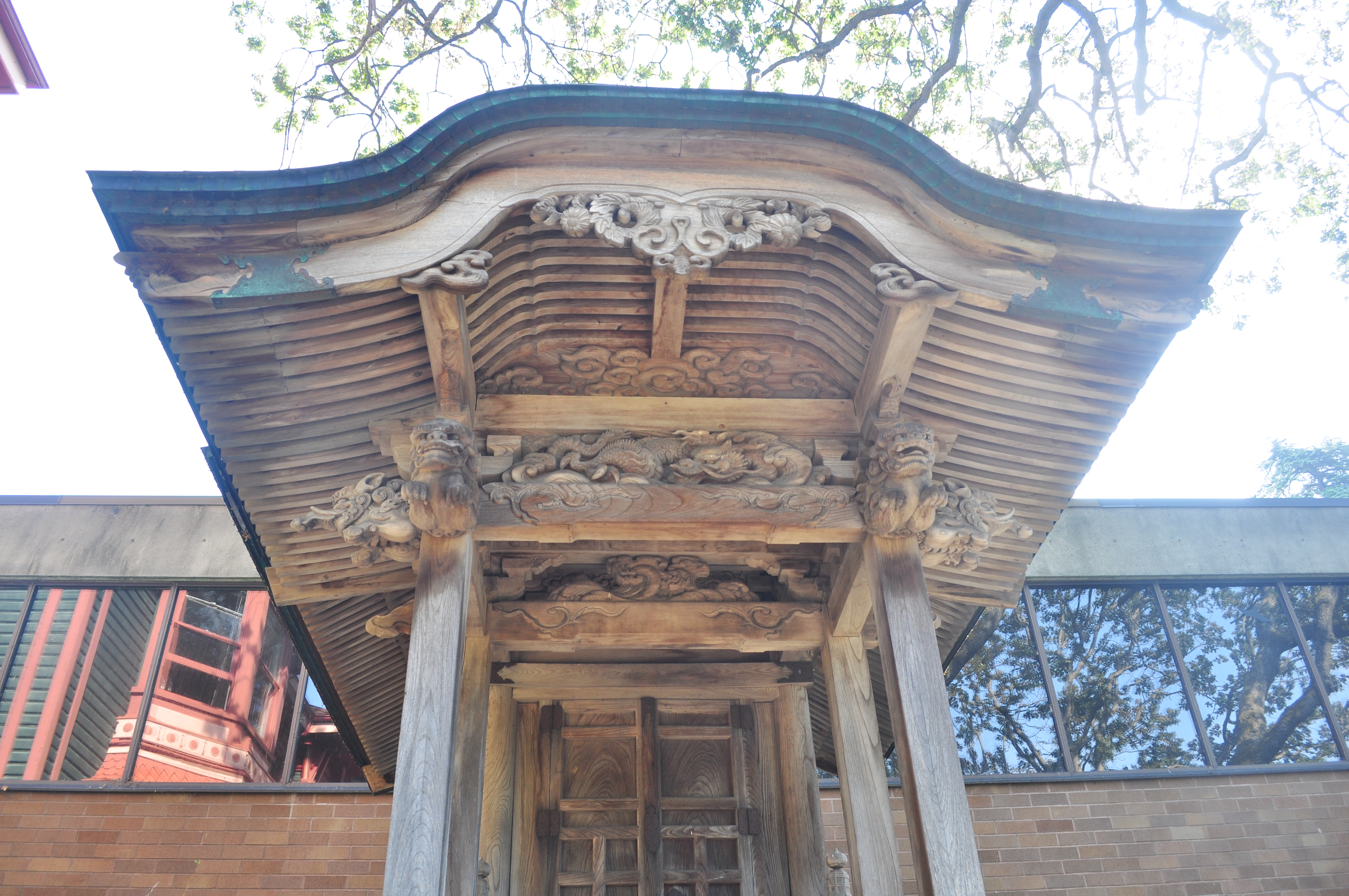
A Shinto shrine in the museum's Asian Garden

The museum's collection of Asian art features old and new works, including bronze objects, ceramics, textiles, and amber and ivory carvings. The museum's Asian collection was started in 1973 by the museum's first director, Colin Graham. Two Japanese prints, acquired by the museum in the 1950s, were the first two items that formed the Asian collection. Other works from the exhibit includes a Chinese painting valued at C$6 million in 2016, and a Japanese byōbu created by Kanō Sanraku. The byōbu features a depiction of a peacock displaying its plumage next to a pine tree, painted on a gold leaf. The 197 cm (78 in) by 370 cm (150 in) byōbu was donated to the museum in 1995, and was restored with cooperation from the Government of Japan for approximately C$150,000. The byōbu was valued at C$500,000 in 2016. The museum's outdoor Asian garden includes the only Meiji era Shinto shrine in North America.

== See also ==
- List of art museums
- List of museums in British Columbia
