= Rockland, Greater Victoria =

Coordinates: 48°25′N 123°20′W

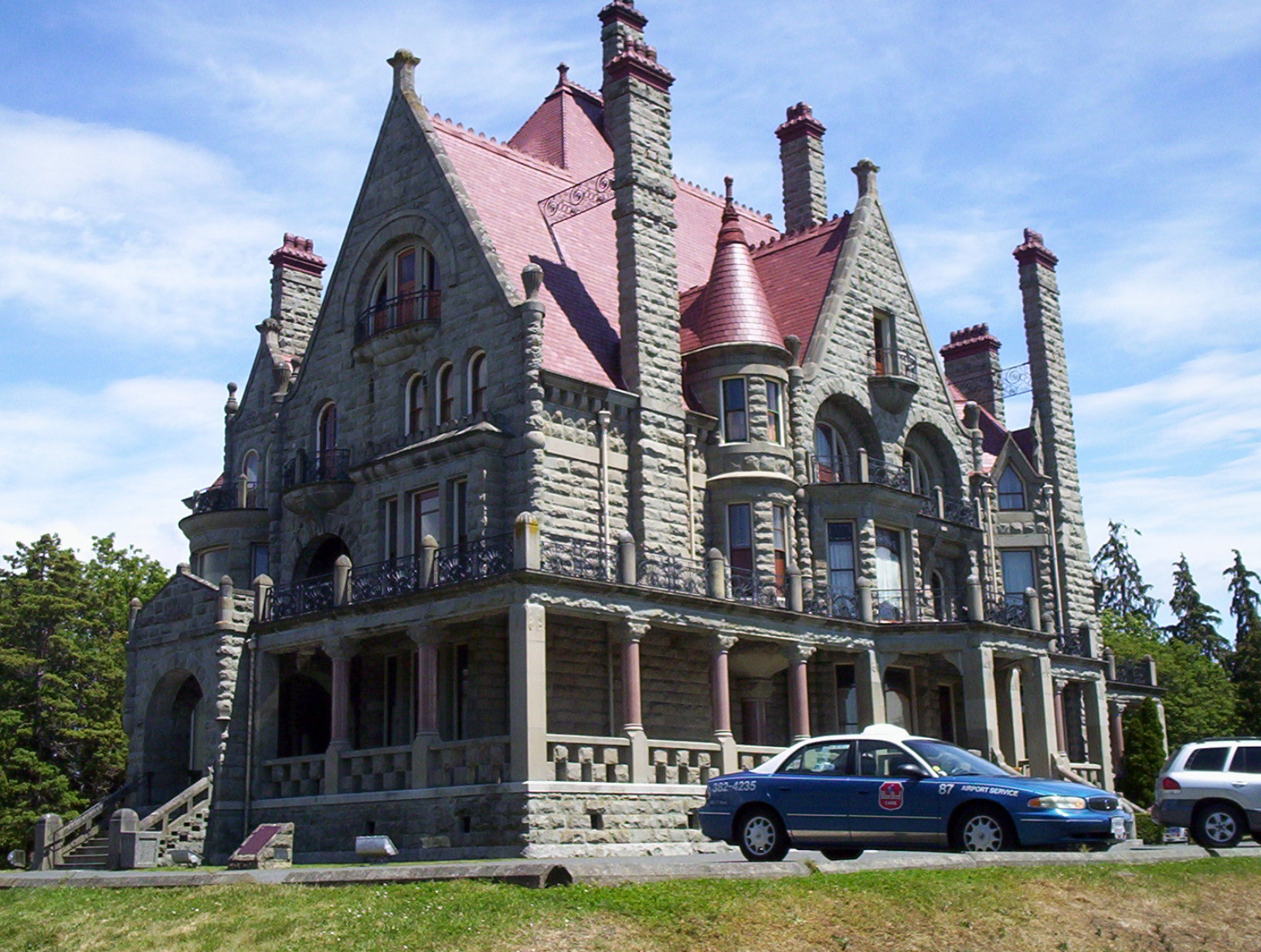
Craigdarroch Castle on 11 June 2005

Rockland is a historic neighbourhood of Victoria, British Columbia, Canada, located just southeast of downtown and northeast of Beacon Hill Park, and comprising the northern portion of the official city neighbourhood of Fairfield. Its boundaries are imprecise but the area roughly flanks Rockland Avenue.

The neighbourhood was founded as, and remains, one of the tonier neighbourhoods in the city, and contains a notable concentration of opulent houses and heritage architecture and lush gardenscapes. The two largest, and most famous, of Rockland's residences are Craigdarroch Castle, built by the Dunsmuir fortune, and Government House.

== History ==
The area known today as Rockland was originally divided between the land grants taken up by James Douglas, second governor of the Colony of Vancouver Island and Joseph Despard Pemberton. As early as 1860 Cary Castle was built on a high point in Rockland with extensive views south to the Strait of Juan de Fuca. Cary Castle was used as residence by Arthur Kennedy, governor of Vancouver Island and served as the vice-regal residence for the Lieutenant-Governors of British Columbia when the Province entered Confederation in 1871. The original Cary Castle was destroyed by fire in 1903, but was replaced by another grand mansion designed by architects Samuel Maclure, designer of many of Victoria's grandest homes, and Francis Rattenbury, architect of the British Columbia Parliament Buildings. This building was in turn destroyed by fire in 1957, and was replaced by the present building that serves as Government House.

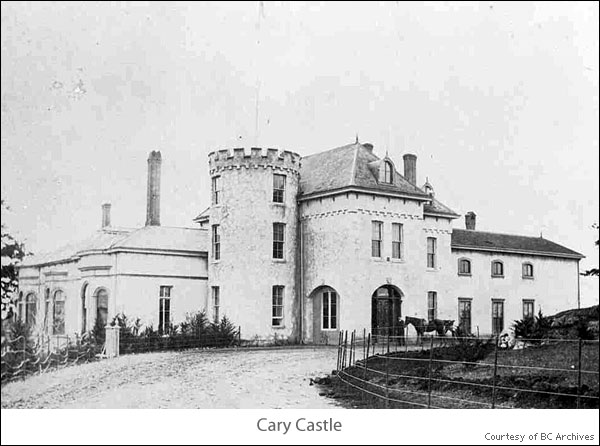
Cary Castle, British Columbia's first Government House

In the late Victorian period additional grand homes were constructed along Belcher Avenue, as Rockland Avenue was then known, including Duvals, constructed in 1862 and occupied by Joseph Needham, then Chief Justice of the Colony of Vancouver Island and later of Trinidad, before being sold to Francis Jones Barnard who operated a freighting company and stage coach line to the Cariboo and was later a member of the House of Commons of Canada (his son Francis Stillman Barnard was later Lieutenant-Governor). Gonzales, the home of Joseph Pemberton, was built in 1885 near the corner of Rockland and St. Charles Street. Fairholme, the home of John Chapman Davie and his wife Sara Holmes Todd, was built in 1886 on Rockland Hill. Gyppeswyk, built in 1889 for the Greens who, like many of Rockland's early residents, relocated from the once fashionable James Bay neighbourhood to take up residence in Rockland, served briefly as the residence of the Lieutenant Governor of British Columbia after a fire destroyed Cary Castle. Located on Moss Street, Gyppeswyk forms today the nucleus of the Greater Victoria Art Gallery. Another home built in 1889 was The Laurels, which was later used as a boys' school, the gymnasium of which continues in use as the Langham Court Theatre. Further along Rockland Avenue stands the Rattenbury-designed residence built in 1900 for Lyman Duff, who became Chief Justice of Canada and his wife Elizabeth.

The most costly residence built in Rockland during the Victorian era was Craigdarroch Castle. Craigdarroch Castle was constructed in the 1890s as a family residence for the wealthy coal baron Robert Dunsmuir and his wife Joan. Robert died in April 1889, more than a year before construction on the castle was completed, and was set on 27 acres (110,000 m^{2}) of grounds with an entrance on Fort Street. His sons Alexander and James took over the role of finishing the castle after his death. The initial architect of the castle, Warren Williams, also died before completion of the castle. His work was taken over by his associate, Arthur L. Smith, in 1890. After the death of Joan Dunsmuir the castle was raffled off, served as a convalescent home for soldiers during the First World War, then as Victoria College, the forerunner to the University of Victoria from 1920 to 1946.

Apart from Government House itself, there are relatively few public buildings of any type in Rockland. At the beginning of Rockland Avenue on the edge of Downtown Victoria stands Christ Church Cathedral, begun in the 1890s with construction extending to 1990. Built in a Gothic style reminiscent of Notre Dame Cathedral in Paris and Durham Cathedral, Christ Church is the cathedral church of the diocese of British Columbia. The Art Gallery of Greater Victoria on Moss Street is the only other significant public institution in the area.
