= Fairholme Manor Bed and Breakfast =

Fairholme Manor
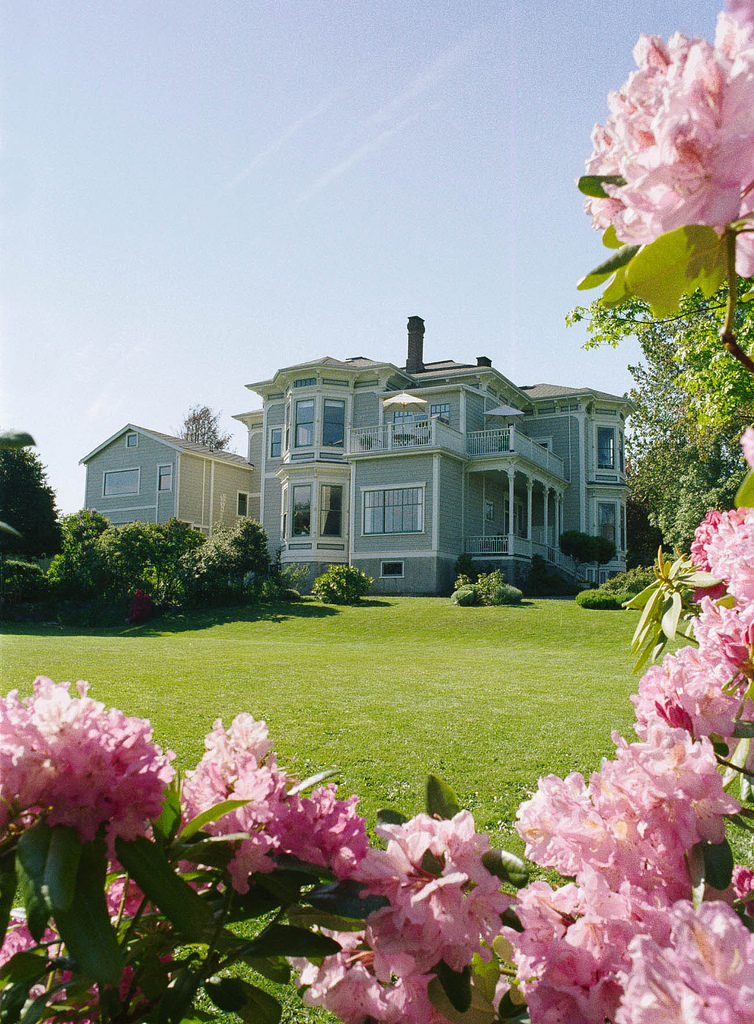
- Fairholme Manor Bed and Breakfast

- Location within Canada

General information
- Architectural style: Italianate
- Location: 638 Rockland Place; Victoria, British Columbia; V8S 3R2
- Coordinates: 48.419944°N 123.339214°W
- Completed: 1886
- Cost: $7,000

Design and construction
- Architect: John Teague

Website
- www.fairholmemanor.com

Fairholme Manor is a Designated Heritage building located in the Rockland neighbourhood of Victoria, British Columbia, Canada. It was built in 1886 on Rockland Hill, in a prestigious area known for its wealthy inhabitants, large lots and lush gardenscapes.

It was constructed for the sum of $7,000 by contractors Hill and Conley and designed in an Italianate style by architect John Teague. The home's rambling, two-story symmetry; overhanging eaves with decorative brackets; narrow bay windows; and low-pitched, gabled roof are all features typical of this fanciful late 19th century style.

Fairholme was built for John Chapman Davie, a prominent doctor and surgeon who is known today as an early promoter of Sir Joseph Lister's antiseptic surgical methods. In addition to introducing the surgical practice to British Columbia, he was also largely responsible for the design of the first operating room at the Royal Jubilee Hospital.

Davie lived at Fairholme with his wife, Sara Holmes Todd, and his 3 children from a previous marriage. Sara Holmes Todd succumbed to pneumonia in 1894; Davie died in 1911. The building was fully restored in 1996 and now operates as a bed and breakfast.
