= Fairfield, Harris County, Texas =

Unincorporated area in Texas, US

Coordinates: 30.0071079°N 95.7479964°W

Fairfield is an unincorporated area in northwestern Harris County, Texas, United States, with approximately 3,200 acres (1,300 ha) of area. It is near U.S. Route 290 and Mason Road. As of 2007, there were 3,652 households.

== Composition ==
As of 2007, the housing prices ranged started at $130,000 and ended in the $700,000s.

== Education ==
The Cypress-Fairbanks Independent School District operates public schools.

In 1998, the zoned schools were Ault Elementary School, Arnold Middle School, and Cy-Fair High School. By 2002 Goodson Middle School had opened, taking territory from Arnold Middle. By 2007, Keith Elementary School had opened and began serving portions of Fairfield, along with Ault. All residents were zoned to another middle school, Spillane Middle School. Cy Woods High School, along with Cy-Fair High, now served the community. By 2012, another elementary school began serving Fairfield along with Ault and Keith, Swenke Elementary. In addition, Salyards Middle School had been built in Fairfield, and Cy-Ranch High School became the local high school.

== Commerce ==
Area shopping centers include Fairfield Towne Center and Houston Premium Outlets.
