= Fairfield House =

Fairfield House may refer to:

- Fairfield House, Bath, England, former home in exile of Emperor Haile Selassie
- Fairfield House, Nelson, New Zealand
- Fairfield House at Uppingham School, England
- Rocky Mills, a c. 1750 colonial house relocated to Henrico County, Virginia, US, and renamed Fairfield

== See also ==
- Fairfield (Berryville, Virginia), US, a historic house
