= Fairfield, New Jersey =

Fairfield may refer to the following places in the U.S. state of New Jersey:

- Fairfield Township, Cumberland County, New Jersey
- Fairfield Township, Essex County, New Jersey
- Fairfield, Monmouth County, New Jersey

== See also ==
- Fairfield Township (disambiguation)
