= Fairfield, Virginia =

Fairfield, Virginia may refer to the following places in the United States:

- Fairfield, part of Sandston, Virginia, in Henrico County
- Fairfield (Berryville, Virginia), a historic estate house
- Fairfield, Rockbridge County, Virginia

== See also ==
- Fairfield Plantation (Gloucester County, Virginia)
