= Fairfield Hospital =

Fairfield Hospital may refer to:

- Fairfield Hospital (Sydney), in Sydney, Australia
- Fairfield Hospital, Bedfordshire, in Fairfield Park, Bedfordshire, England
- Fairfield Infectious Diseases Hospital, in Melbourne, Australia
- Fairfield General Hospital, in Bury, England.
