= John Fairfield (abolitionist) =

John Fairfield (died 1861?) was a "conductor" of the Underground Railroad who was extensively involved in operations in present-day West Virginia prior to the American Civil War. He was known for his often unusual and inventive methods for helping runaway slaves escape to free states. He has also been referred to by the name James Fairfield.

== Bio ==
Fairfield was born to a slave-holding family in Virginia. However, he disagreed with his family's livelihood when he became a young man. When he was twenty, he helped a childhood friend escape from his uncle's farm, taking him to Canada. Upon his return to Virginia, he learned that his uncle was planning to have him arrested, so he took several more slaves belonging to his uncle and led them through the mountains of northern Virginia and on to Canada.

He soon became involved with the abolitionist movement and, during the 1850s, quickly establishing himself with a reputation as one of the most cunning conductors on the Underground Railroad. Primarily using routes directly to the Northeastern United States through Appalachia, he specialized in reuniting broken families.

In one incident, he had been asked by a group of freed slaves to rescue relatives still enslaved in Charleston, West Virginia (then still part of Virginia) where they worked at the saltworks along the Kanawha River. Fairfield, with the assistance of two freedmen, traveled to Charleston posing as a businessman from Louisville, Kentucky. Ingratiating himself with the local slaveholders, he persuaded them to invest in a plan to build boats to haul salt extracted from the Kanawha salt brines and haul his cargo down river to be sold at a substantial profit. While he oversaw the construction of two boats, his "slaves" would scout the area in order to locate their relatives. During the next two nights, the boats were loaded with runaway slaves and quietly sent down river. Fairfield would raise the alarm hours later, furious over the "loss" of his slaves and property, and took it upon himself to organize a search party to overtake the fugitive slaves. Suggesting they split up to search the surrounding area, he arranged to rendezvous with the group but instead rode off in the opposite direction to catch up with the escaped slaves which he eventually led to Canada.

Some argue that Fairfield often went to sometimes excessive lengths, often living in a community for months at a time in order to gain the confidence of local residents. He often posed as a slave trader, slaveholder or a peddler, although his disguises were varied and, on one occasion, impersonated an undertaker managing to help twenty-eight slaves escape in a staged funeral procession. Another time, he used wigs and makeup to disguise his charges. Purchasing train tickets for them, they traveled from Harper's Ferry eventually arriving in Pittsburgh.

During a twelve-year period, he would make numerous trips to almost every slave state freeing several thousand slaves and forwarding them to Canada via agents of the Underground Railroad. He disappeared shortly before the outbreak of the Civil War. An unidentified man fitting Fairfield's description reportedly died during a slave insurrection in 1860 or 1861. The man, who had recently arrived in the area, had been killed in a failed attempt to organize a mass escape of slaves.

Although many conductors often disagreed with his methods including arming his passengers and resorting to violence when necessary, he was greatly admired in the Underground Railroad. Levi Coffin, a Quaker and fellow abolitionist, said of Fairfield,

With all his faults and misguided impulses, and wicked ways, he was a brave man; he never betrayed a trust that was reposed in him, and he was a true friend to the oppressed and suffering slave.

In Ain't No Harm to Kill the Devil: The Life and Legend of John Fairfield, Abolitionist for Hire, Jeffrey S. Copeland offers an alternative theory as to what happened to John Fairfield. Copeland argues that Fairfield would not have undertaken such a risky endeavor as the Cumberland Iron Works escape plan. Fairfield's escapes tended to avoid confrontation. Copeland suggests Fairfield could have instead used the incident to fake his own death and start a new life in Kansas Territory. Copeland has found an 1860 census record for a John Fairfield in Arapahoe County, Kansas Territory.

He was portrayed by Robert Carradine in a 1987 Disney Sunday Movie titled The Liberators, written and directed by Kenneth Johnson.
