= Fairfield station (Metro-North) =

Metro-North Railroad station in Connecticut

Fairfield
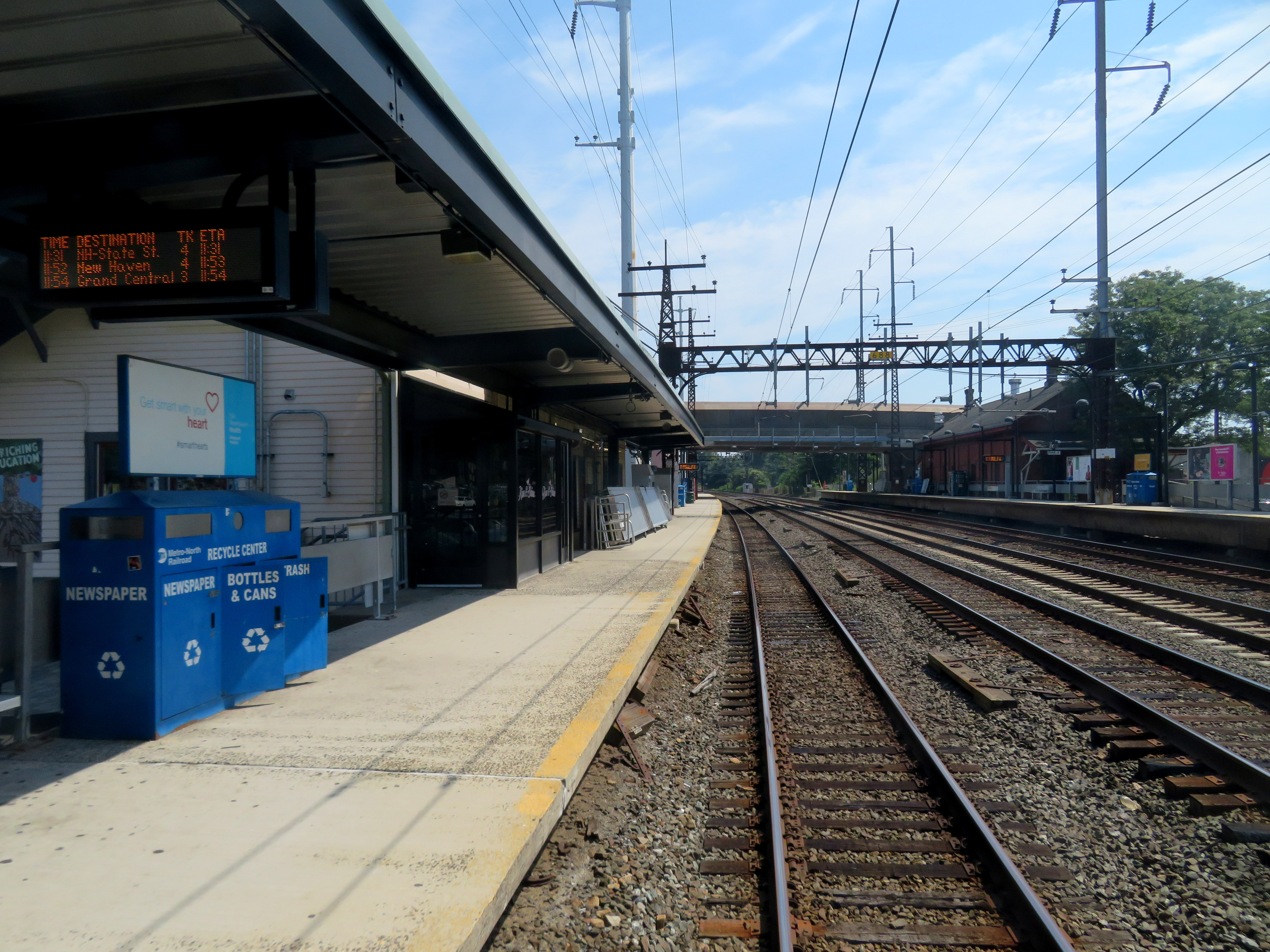
- The westbound platform at Fairfield station in July 2019

General information
- Location: 165 Unquowa Road (westbound); Fairfield, Connecticut
- Coordinates: 41.14413°N 73.25773°W
- Owner: ConnDOT
- Line: ConnDOT New Haven Line (Northeast Corridor)
- Platforms: 2 side platforms
- Tracks: 4
- Connections: GBTA: Coastal Link, 7 Fairfield University Shuttle

Construction
- Parking: 1,216 spaces
- Accessible: Partial (route between platforms not accessible)

Other information
- Fare zone: 18

History
- Opened: December 25, 1848

Passengers
- 2018: 2,311 daily boardings

Services
Preceding station	Metro-North Railroad	Following station
Southport toward Grand Central	New Haven Line	Fairfield–Black Rock toward New Haven or New Haven State Street
Former services
Preceding station	New York, New Haven and Hartford Railroad	Following station
Southport toward New York	Main Line	Bridgeport toward New Haven
- Fairfield Railroad Stations
- U.S. National Register of Historic Places
- Location: Fairfield, Connecticut
- Area: 0.7 acres (0.3 ha)
- Built: 1882, 1890s
- Architectural style: Stick/Eastlake
- NRHP reference No.: 89000926
- Added to NRHP: July 28, 1989
Location

Fairfield station is a commuter rail station on the Metro-North Railroad New Haven Line, located in Fairfield, Connecticut. The former station buildings are listed on the National Register of Historic Places as Fairfield Railroad Stations.

== History ==
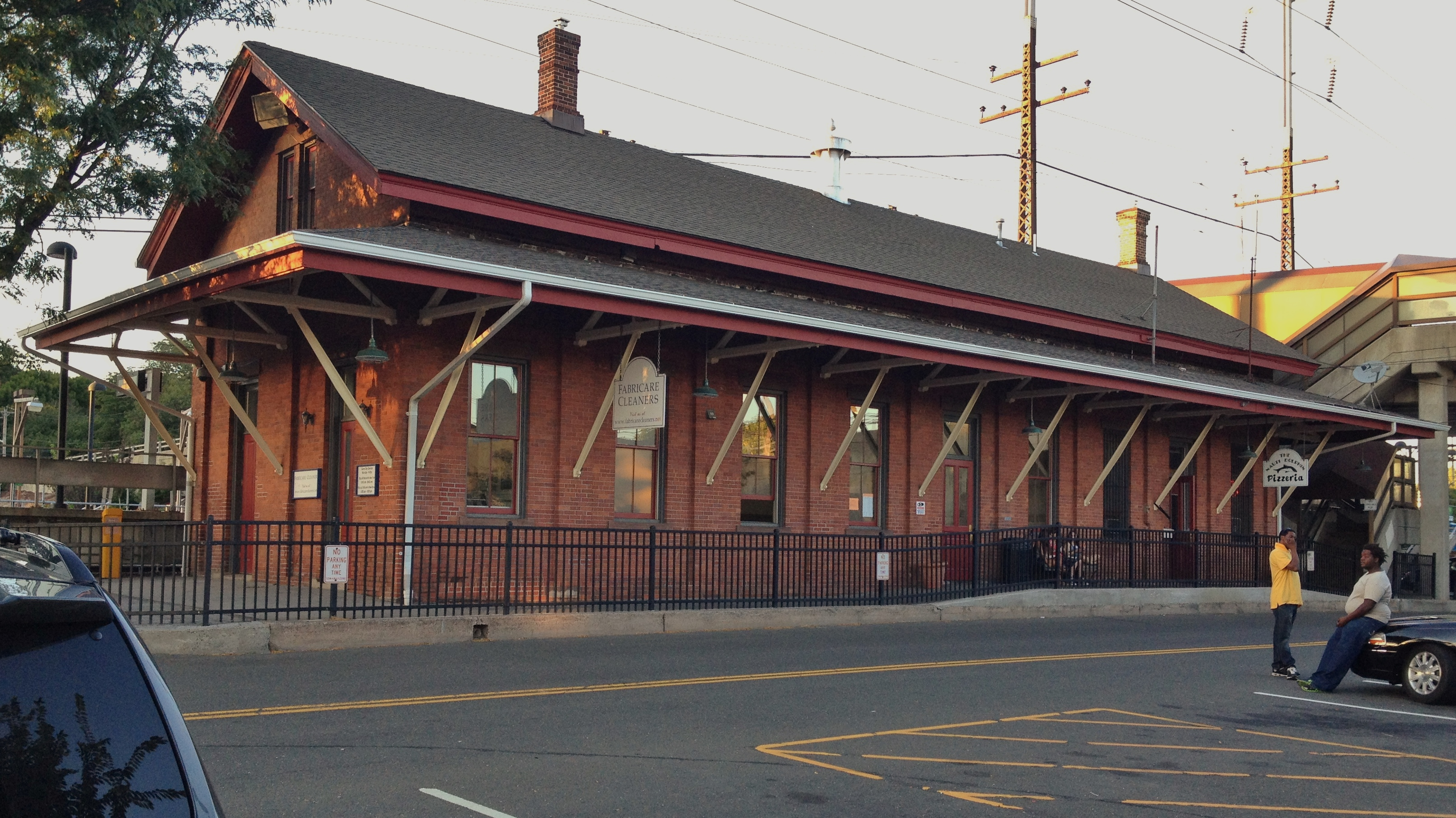
The 1882-built eastbound station

Old station buildings, now reused for other purposes, are adjacent to both platforms. The brick eastbound (south) station was built in 1882. It replaced a station burned by a fire, and "is typical of the substantial brick stations built at small-town stops throughout the state in the period. Whereas earlier stations had been small wood-frame buildings, often in a picturesque Gothic or Italianate style, the stations of the 1880s were brick" to be fire-resistant and were larger to accommodate larger waiting areas and other amenities. They were "well-built but utilitarian" structures. The wooden westbound station "stands as an excellent example of the New Haven Railroad's 1890s passenger facilities" reflecting changed priorities.

The Budd M2 cars necessitated high level platforms, and the low-level platforms were replaced in 1972.

The two station buildings were listed on the National Register of Historic Places in 1989. The 0.7-acre (0.28 ha) listed area was defined to include the two stations and their immediate surroundings, but to exclude a passenger cross-over and stairway, and to exclude associated parking areas.

The ticket window in the westbound station building was closed on July 7, 2010.

== Station layout ==
The station has two side platforms, each six cars (510 feet) long, serving the outer tracks of the four-track Northeast Corridor. Stairs connect the platforms to the Unquowa Road overpass at the east end of the station. Fairfield station is only partially accessible - while the platforms are fully accessible, there is no accessible route between the platforms.

The station has 1,216 parking spaces, 376 of which are owned by the state and operated by the town; the main lot is on the north side of the station.

== See also ==
- National Register of Historic Places listings in Fairfield County, Connecticut
