= Fairfield Inn =

Fairfield Inn may refer to:

- Fairfield Inn (Fairfield, Pennsylvania), a historic inn listed on the NRHP in Pennsylvania
- Fairfield Inn (Cashiers, North Carolina), listed on the NRHP in North Carolina
- Fairfield Inn by Marriott, a chain of hotels
