= Cook Street Village =

Shopping district in Victoria, British Columbia

Coordinates: 48.4155°N 123.3561°W

The Root Cellar in Cook Street Village, Victoria, BC

Big Wheel Burger in Cook Street Village, Victoria, BC

Cook Street Village is a shopping district in Victoria, British Columbia. There is an abundance of cafes, restaurants, pubs, and numerous boutique grocery shops.
