= Fairfield, Tennessee =

Fairfield, Tennessee may refer to the following places in Tennessee:

- Fairfield, Bedford County, Tennessee, an unincorporated community
- Fairfield, Blount County, Tennessee, an unincorporated community
- Fairfield, Sumner County, Tennessee, a census-designated place
