= Fairfield, Greater Victoria =

Neighbourhood in British Columbia, Canada

Coordinates: 48.4164°N 123.355361°W

Fairfield is a neighbourhood of Victoria, British Columbia. It is bounded by the James Bay, Downtown, Harris Green, Fernwood, Rockland, and Gonzales (Foul Bay) neighbourhoods, and meets the Strait of Juan de Fuca to the south.

== Community ==
Fairfield is the southernmost neighbourhood in the city of Victoria, on southern Vancouver Island. It is Victoria's largest community by population and area, when considered together with the adjacent Gonzales neighbourhood.

Fairfield is a residential community with a mix of low-rise apartments and single family homes on well-maintained, tree-lined streets, such as Wellington Avenue. It is bounded to the east by Oak Bay, to the north by the community of Rockland, to the west by Beacon Hill Park and to the south by the ocean shoreline of the Strait of Juan de Fuca. Fairfield features the historic Ross Bay Cemetery, as well as many heritage buildings dating from the late Victorian and Edwardian periods. The Fairfield Gonzalez Community Association (FGCA) serves "to enhance the quality of life in Fairfield by involving community members in identifying and acting on the needs of area residents".

The FGCA operates from and maintains the Fairfield Community Place, Fairfield's only neighbourhood centre. Its various committees help organize special events, recycling programs, beach cleanups, emergency preparedness programs, review and publicize planning and zoning changes, increase public awareness of community impacts from development, etc.

Significant population growth and demographic shifts are expected for southern Vancouver Island. The City of Victoria has prepared a neighbourhood profile from 2001 data.

== History ==
Having founded the Hudson's Bay Company's (HBC) Fort Victoria in the 1850s, Sir James Douglas acquired for himself a large property between Fort Street and Clover Point, which he called Fairfield Farm. To the east lay the lands of Joseph Despard Pemberton (which stretched into what would become Oak Bay) and Isabelle Ross, BC's first female land owner (the location of Ross Bay Cemetery, land mistakenly thought to have been owned by her husband and HBC chief factor Charles Ross).

"Fairfield", at 601 Su'it (formerly Trutch) Street, was built in 1861 by Joseph Trutch, who would later become the first Lieutenant Governor of British Columbia. Although some houses in the western areas of Fairfield date from the 1880s, it was shortly after the turn of the century that much of the neighbourhood was developed, in a residential housing boom that ended in 1913. It was in the early part of the twentieth century that the original Sir James Douglas Elementary School and the present Margaret Jenkins Elementary School were built to serve the community.

One of the oldest structures in central Fairfield is located at 1263 Richardson Street, a gothic gabled building from the 1860s (now strata-titled) that was moved down the hill from Rockland Avenue in the Rockland neighbourhood to make way for a much grander residence that today stands beside the Langham Court theatre.

== Landmarks and Parkland ==
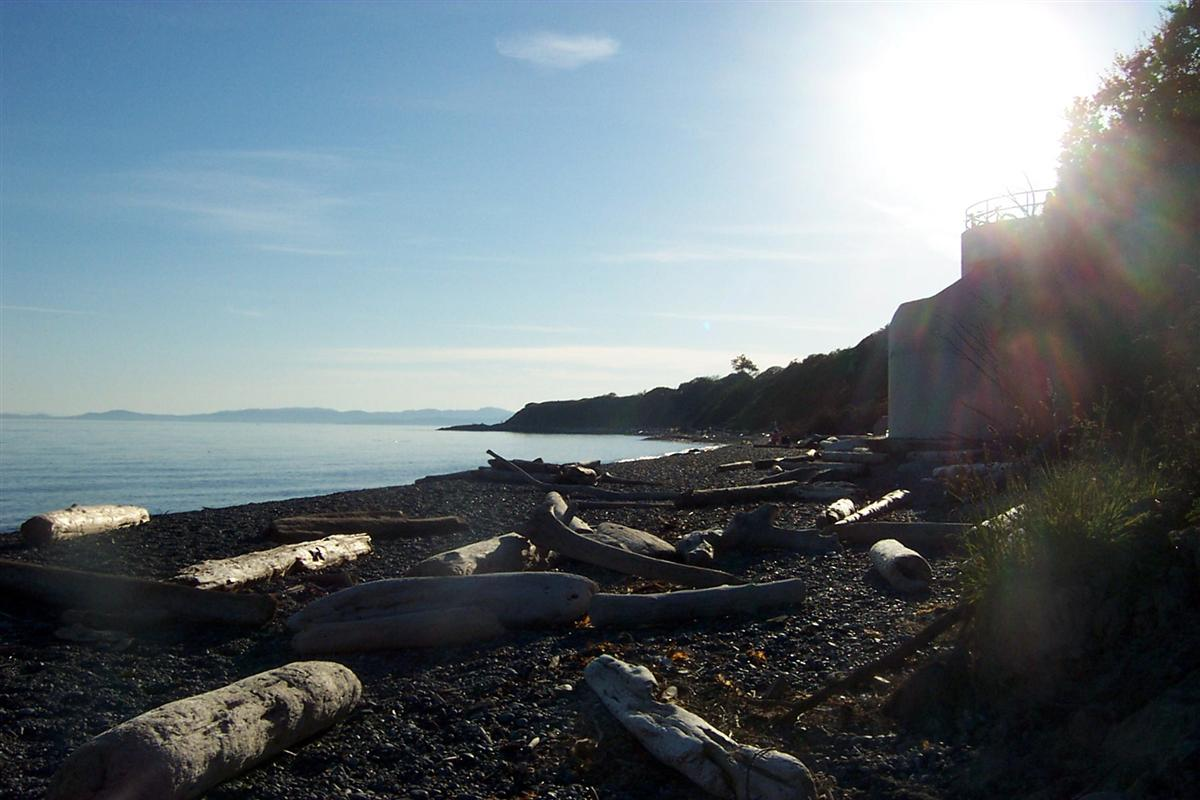
The beach at Beacon Hill

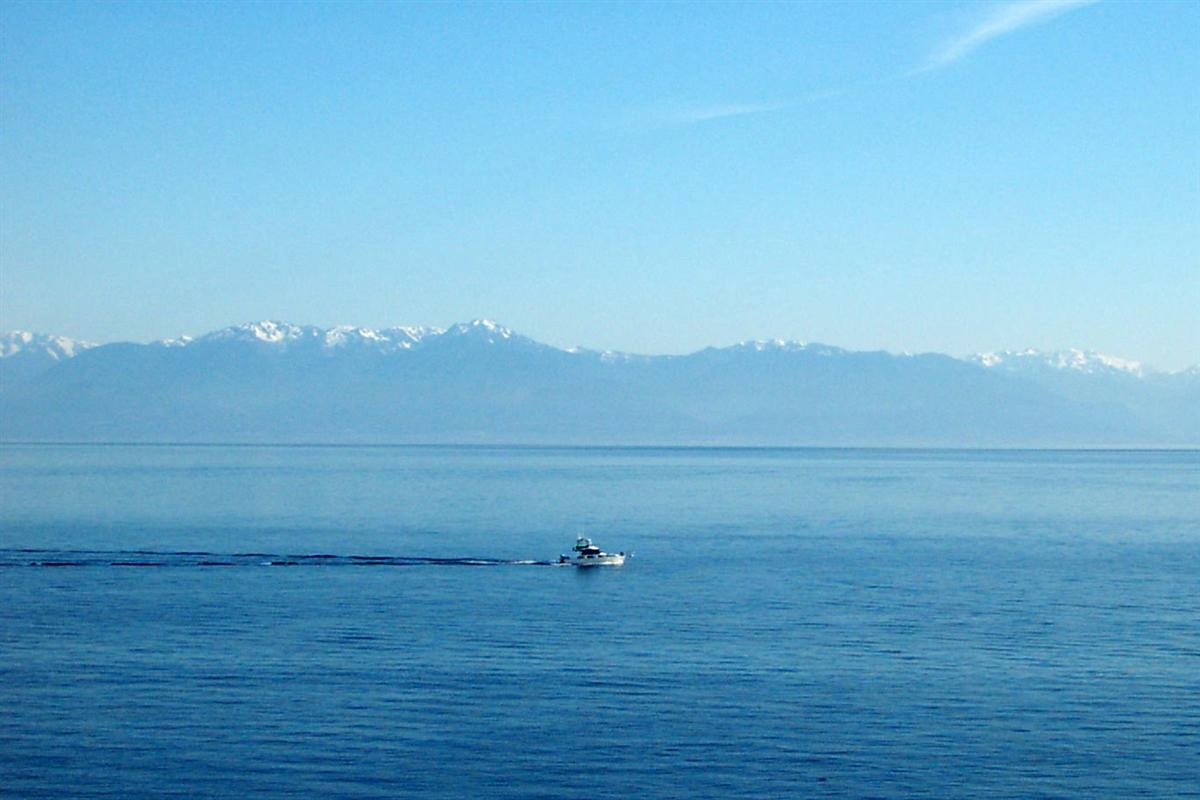
The view from Clover Point

City Parks in the Fairfield neighbourhood include:

- Beacon Hill
- Clover Point
- Ross Bay Cemetery
- Moss Rock (Fairfield Hill) Park
- Robert Porter Park
- Brooke Street Park
- Eberts Street Park
- Pioneer Square

as well as several other smaller parks, playgrounds and greenspaces.

Clover Point offers views south to Washington State's Olympic Mountains, east to the snow clad Mount Baker, and west to the Sooke Hills of southwestern Vancouver Island. The ocean waters off of the Point and along the Dallas Road waterfront are popular with wind surfing and para-sailing enthusiasts thanks to strong on-shore winds. Clover Point is also the site of one of Victoria's two sewage pumping station's and a possible location for a sewage treatment plant mandated for the city by the BC government in July 2006.

Landmarks and areas of special interest include:

- YM-YWCA of Greater Victoria
- Christ Church Cathedral and School
- Mount St. Mary Hospital
- Beacon Hill Montessori Pre-School
- Fairfield United Church
- Sir James Douglas Elementary School
- Ross Bay Villa (a.k.a. The Winter House)

Fairfield is the site of popular commercial hubs, Cook Street Village, Five Corners and the Fairfield Plaza.

Cook Street Village, a commercial area characterized by sidewalk-flanking Horse Chestnut trees, low-height buildings and the absence of bisecting roads, is a popular shopping and social strip in Fairfield, with cafés, restaurants, small boutiques and grocery stores. In 2006, proposed developments within this part of Fairfield sparked concern and debate among local residents.

Another small neighbourhood centre, known as Five Corners, is located at the intersection of Moss Street and Fairfield Road, featuring Sir James Douglas Elementary School, Fairfield United Church, Fairfield Bicycles, a general store, fish and chips shop, veterinary clinic and other services. This location has historically been a hub of community activity since the community's earliest days. The school yard of Sir James Douglas school is the site of the locally-famous Moss Street Market, which runs weekly from April until October.

The Fairfield Plaza, a compact strip mall, is another modest shopping area, situated near the Fairfield/Gonzales border. Across Fairfield Road from the western entrance to the Fairfield Plaza is Emily Carr’s grave, in the Ross Bay Cemetery.
