= Fairfield, North Carolina =

Fairfield, North Carolina may refer to:

- Fairfield, Hyde County, North Carolina
- Fairfield, Union County, North Carolina
