= April Fairfield =

American politician

April Fairfield is an American politician from the state of North Dakota. She is a member of the Democratic Party.

Fairfield served in the North Dakota House of Representatives from 1996 to 2002, and the North Dakota State Senate from 2002 to 2006. She currently works as the executive director of the Head Injury Association of North Dakota, a nonprofit group.

Fairfield ran for Secretary of State of North Dakota in the 2014 election.

Fairfield and her husband, Steve DeLap, have a daughter, Kennedy, who was born in March 2001.

Party political offices
Preceded by Corey Mock	Democratic nominee for North Dakota Secretary of State; 2014	Succeeded by Joshua Boschee
