= Fairfield–Black Rock station =

Railroad station in Fairfield, Connecticut, US

Fairfield–Black Rock
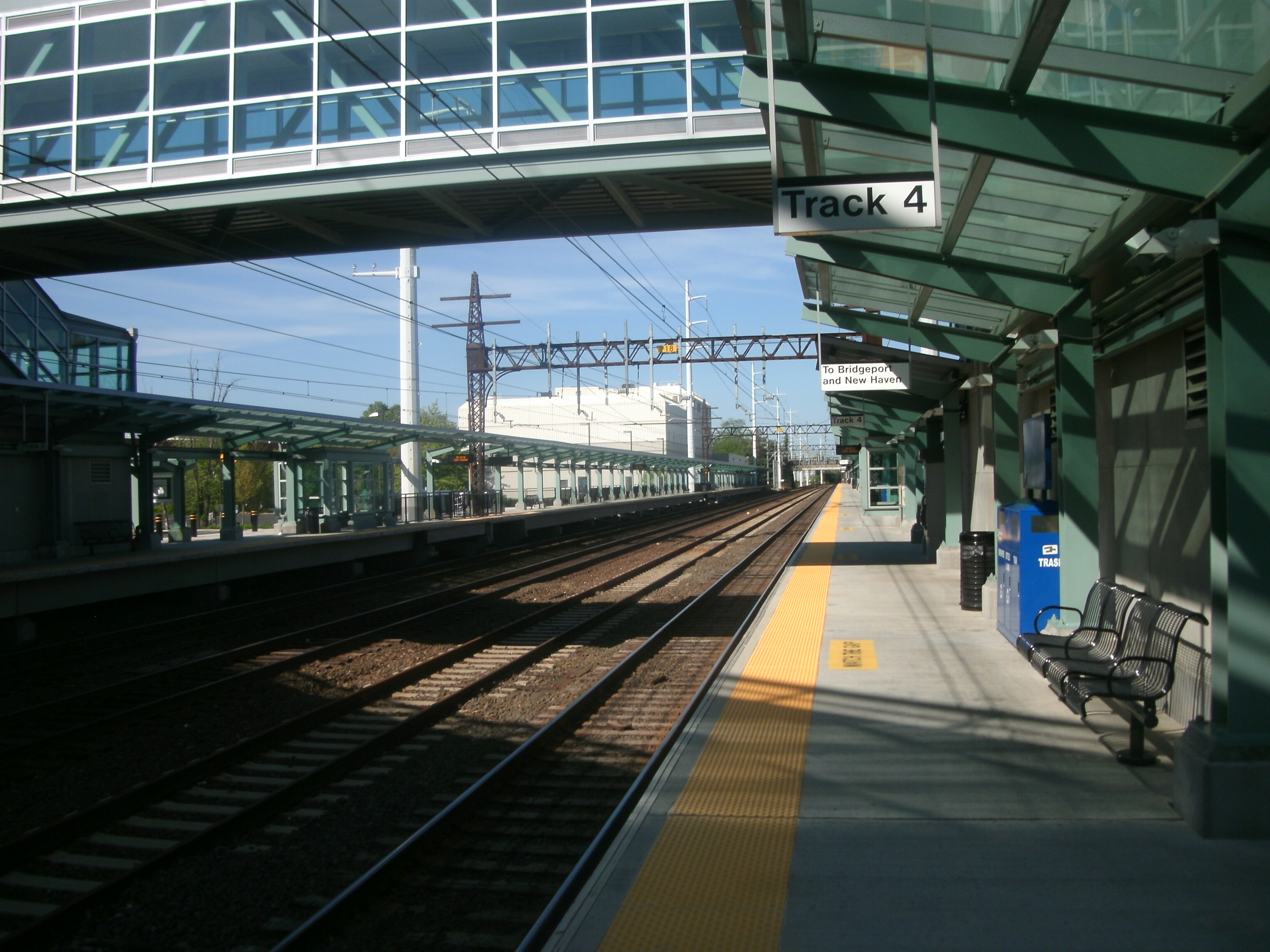
- The station in May 2012

General information
- Location: 61 Constant Comment Way; Fairfield, Connecticut
- Coordinates: 41.1611°N 73.2343°W
- Line: ConnDOT New Haven Line (Northeast Corridor)
- Platforms: 2 side platforms
- Tracks: 4
- Connections: Greater Bridgeport Transit Authority: 5, 7

Construction
- Parking: 1,500 spaces
- Accessible: Yes

Other information
- Fare zone: 18

History
- Opened: December 5, 2011
- Former names: Fairfield Metro (2011–2024)

Passengers
- 2018: 2,215 daily boardings

Services
Preceding station	Metro-North Railroad	Following station
Fairfield toward Grand Central	New Haven Line	Bridgeport toward New Haven or New Haven State Street
Location

Fairfield–Black Rock station (formerly Fairfield Metro station) is a commuter rail station on the Metro-North Railroad's New Haven Line, located in the town of Fairfield, Connecticut. It opened as an infill station on December 5, 2011, and was renamed in June 2024. The station has two 12-car-long side platforms serving the outer tracks of the four-track Northeast Corridor. It is fully accessible.

== History ==
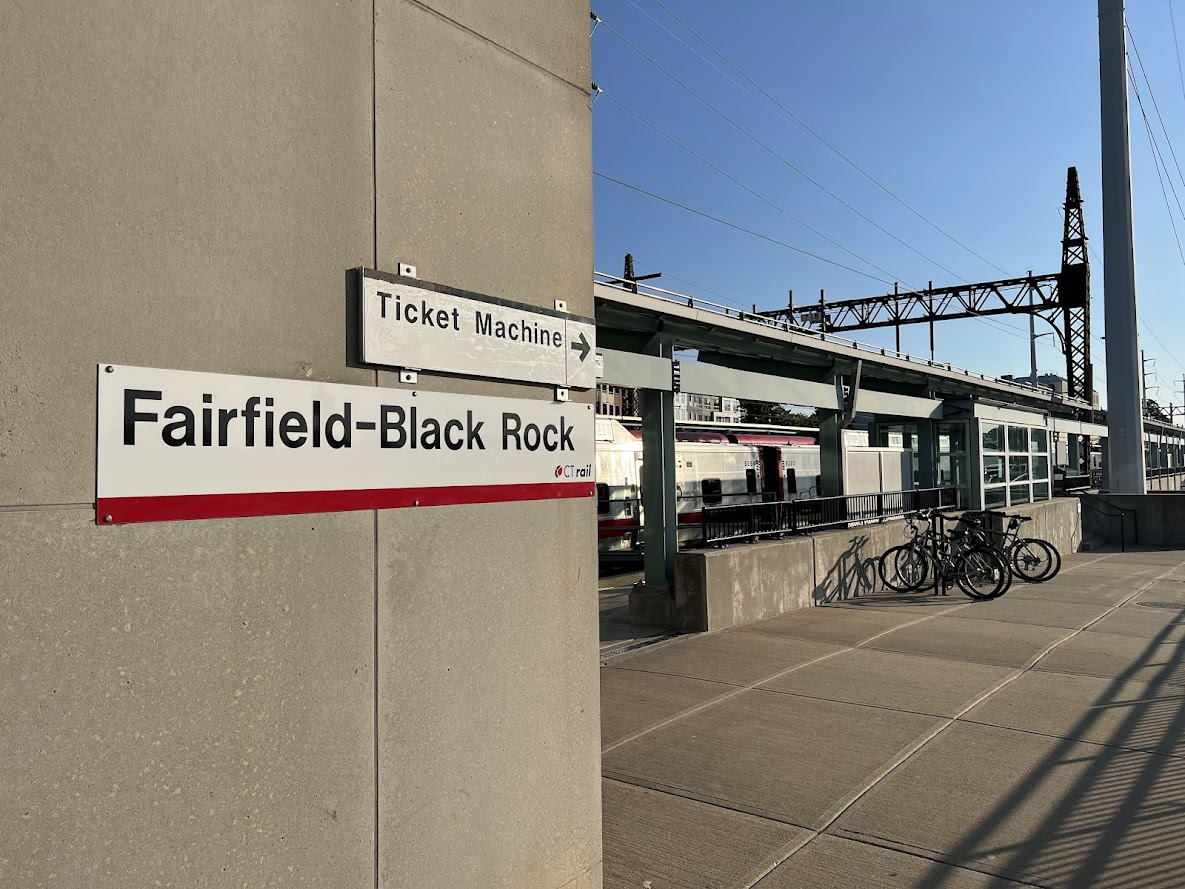
Fairfield–Black Rock station signs on platforms in July 2024

A three party agreement was approved in 2001 between the Town of Fairfield, the State of Connecticut and developer Blackrock Realty securing state, local and private funding to build the train station and adjoining open space and clean up work. In December 2009, the state announced a bond authorization for $20 million wherein the state would assume the developer's obligation for infrastructure work and continue the project.

In April 2010, the developer's obligation for infrastructure improvements was reduced to $5.2 million with the balance being financed through the state bonds. Responsibility for construction of the 1,500-car parking lot and access road at the town's third train station on lower Black Rock Turnpike was transferred to the town as the developer's financial obligation was reduced. In July 2011, an audit of the contract and the cost overruns was approved by the Fairfield Board of Finance and members of the Representative Town Meeting. The project includes creation of a 10 acres (4.0 ha) open space and public park along Ash Creek between Kings Highway in Fairfield and the Black Rock neighborhood of Bridgeport.

Blackrock Realty and the state originally used "Fairfield Metro", but Fairfield residents found the name bland. The town held an online survey in December 2010 to propose an alternate name. Popular suggestions included Black Rock, Black Rock Turnpike, Ash Creek, and Grasmere, among others. The state had the final word in naming the station and chose to follow or disregard the town's recommendations. To meet the opening deadline of November 2011, a name had to be chosen by February 2011. The final name of Fairfield Metro was announced on March 18, 2011. The station opened on December 5, 2011.

On March 28, 2024, the Connecticut Department of Transportation announced plans to rename Fairfield Metro to Fairfield–Black Rock in the coming months. Station signage was changed in June 2024.
