= New Haven State Street station =

Railroad station in Connecticut

New Haven – State St
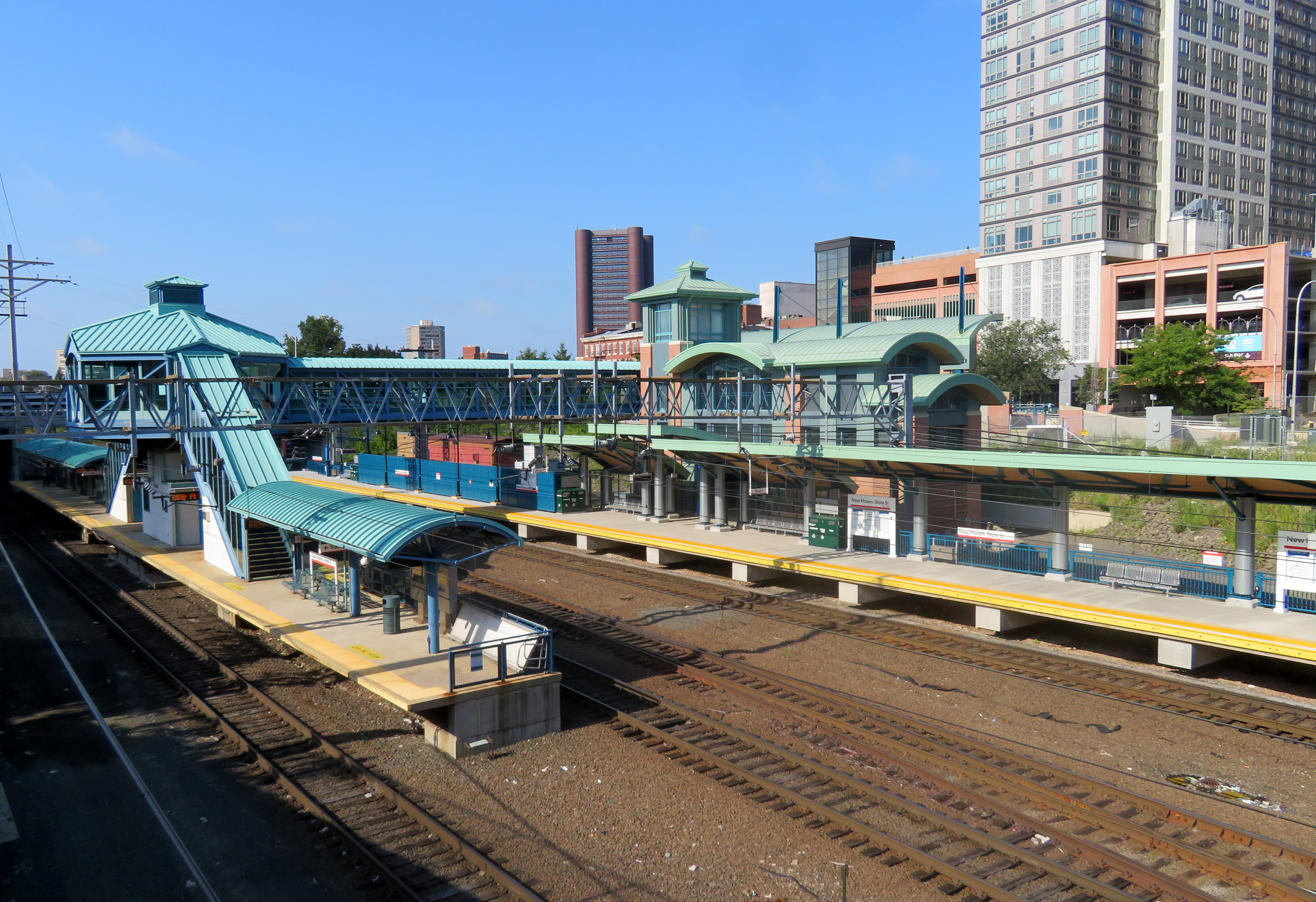
- New Haven State Street station in September 2018

General information
- Location: 259 State Street; New Haven, Connecticut; United States
- Coordinates: 41.305763°N 72.921753°W
- Owner: CTDOT
- Lines: Amtrak Northeast Corridor; New Haven–Springfield Line
- Platforms: 1 island platform 1 side platform
- Tracks: 4
- Connections: CT Transit: 204, 206, 212, 223, 274, 278; Yale Shuttle: Red Line

Construction
- Cycle facilities: Racks, Bike New Haven bikeshare station
- Accessible: Yes
- Architect: Michael Baker International

Other information
- Station code: Amtrak: STS
- Fare zone: 21 (Metro-North)

History
- Opened: June 7, 2002
- Rebuilt: 2017–2018

Passengers
- FY 2025: 20,695 annually (Amtrak)
- 2018: 201 daily boardings (Metro-North)
- 2019: 177 daily boardings (Shore Line East)
Services
Preceding station	Amtrak	Following station
New Haven toward Norfolk, Newport News or Roanoke	Northeast Regional	Wallingford toward Springfield
New Haven Terminus	Hartford Line	Wallingford toward Springfield
New Haven Terminus	Valley Flyer	Wallingford toward Greenfield
Acela does not stop here
Vermonter does not stop here
Preceding station	CT Rail	Following station
New Haven Union Station Terminus	Shore Line East	Branford toward New London
New Haven Union Station limited weekday service toward Stamford	Shore Line East	Branford toward New London
New Haven Union Station Terminus	Hartford Line	Wallingford toward Springfield
Preceding station	Metro-North Railroad	Following station
New Haven toward Grand Central	New Haven Line peak service	Terminus
Location

New Haven State Street station is a commuter rail station located on State Street in downtown New Haven, Connecticut. The secondary railroad station in the city, it is located 0.8 miles (1.3 km) northeast of the much larger New Haven Union Station and is intended to offer easier access to New Haven's downtown business district. It is served by CT Rail Shore Line East and Hartford Line commuter trains, Amtrak Hartford Line trains, Springfield-terminating Northeast Regional trains, and Valley Flyer trains, and a limited number of Metro-North Railroad New Haven Line trains. Originally proposed in 1996, State Street opened on June 7, 2002. A second platform opened on June 8, 2018, in time for the beginning of Hartford Line service.

== Station design ==
The Northeast Corridor has four tracks at this location, in a shallow cut. From southeast to northwest, the tracks are numbered 1, 2, 4 and 6. State Street has a three-car-long high-level island platform between tracks 4 and 6, and a 344 feet (105 m) four car-long side platform serving track 1. Track 2 is used only by trains bypassing the station. The station originally only had the island platform when it opened; the side platform was built for the 2018 opening of the Hartford Line. Because the side platform was not part of the original station, the two platforms are not directly connected and are accessed separately, with two pedestrian bridges, staircases and elevators connecting the platforms to the street-level entrance and busway.

== History ==
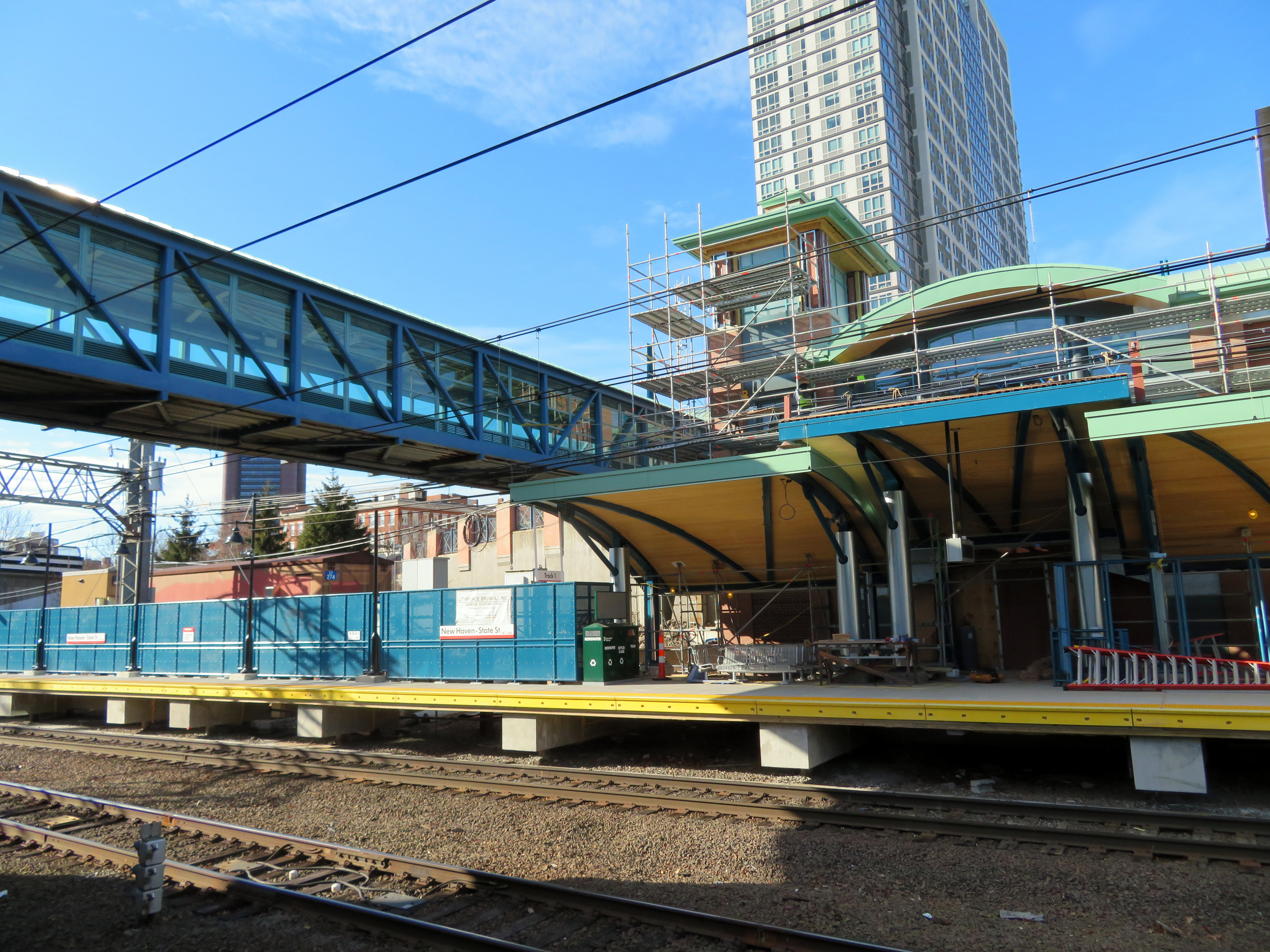
Second platform under construction in December 2017

A station closer to New Haven's business district than Union Station was first proposed in 1996. The station opened on June 7, 2002, for Shore Line East service, with Metro-North service added on June 24, 2002.

Construction on the second platform began in July 2016, using $10 million in federal funding from a Transportation Investment Generating Economic Recovery grant. The second platform was originally expected to be complete by the end of 2017. The construction of the second platform was paired with security improvements, LED walkway and platform lighting, a sheltered bicycle parking area, platform snow melters, and real-time train information displays. Hartford Line and New Haven–Springfield Shuttle service began on June 16, 2018. Most Shore Line East and all Hartford Line trains (both Amtrak and CT Rail) stop at the station.

CTDOT plans to make additional changes to the station. The Court Street road bridge will be replaced with a 16-foot (4.9 m)-wide pedestrian and bicycle bridge at a cost of $16 million. The existing island platform will be demolished and rebuilt, with connections to both footbridges. It will have 394 feet (120 m) of platform face (enough for four cars) on the west side and 540 feet (160 m) of platform face (long enough for six cars) on the east side. Cost of the platform work is anticipated to be $97 million. As of January 2026, the Court Street work is expected to last from spring 2027 to mid-2028, with the platform work lasting from spring 2029 to fall 2030.
