= Harlem (disambiguation) =

Harlem is a neighborhood in Upper Manhattan, New York City, United States.

Harlem also may refer to:

== Other places in the United States ==
- Harlem, Florida
- Harlem, Georgia
- Harlem, Illinois
- Harlem, Montana
- Harlem, Ohio
- Harlem, Pennsylvania
- Harlem Avenue, a major street in Chicago and its suburbs
- Harlem River, a tidal strait east of Manhattan Island

== Arts and entertainment ==
=== Music ===
- Harlem (band), an American garage rock band
- Harlem Spartans, or Harlem, a British hip hop collective
- Harlem (album), by Shawn Amos, 2011
- Harlem (Ellington), a 1951 symphonic jazz composition
- "Harlem" (New Politics song), 2013
- Harlem" (Bill Withers song), a song by Bill Withers, 1971
- "Harlem", a song by DJ Kay Sl"ay from the 2004 album The Streetsweeper, Vol. 2

=== Other uses in arts and entertainment ===
- Harlem (film), a 1943 Italian sports crime film
- "Harlem" (poem), a 1951 poem by Langston Hughes
- Harlem (TV series), a 2021 American comedy
- Harlem: A Melodrama of Negro Life in Harlem, a 1929 play by Wallace Thurman and William Jourdan Rapp
- Harlem, a one-issue publication by the Niggerati
- "Harlem" (Street Level Hero)

== People ==
- Harlem Berry (born 2007), American football player
- Gro Harlem Brundtland (Gro Brundtland, born Gro Harlem, 1939), Norwegian former prime minister
- Harlem Désir (born 1959), French politician
- Harlem Yu (born), Taiwanese singer-songwriter

== Other uses ==
- Harlem (horse) (foaled 2012), a British racehorse
- Club Harlem, a former nightclub in Atlantic City, New Jersey, United States of America

== See also ==
- Haarlem (disambiguation)
- Spanish Harlem (disambiguation)
- West Harlem (disambiguation)
- Harlem Shuffle (disambiguation)
- Harlem shake (disambiguation)
