= 59th Street station (New York Central Railroad) =

Never-opened train station in Manhattan, New York

59th Street
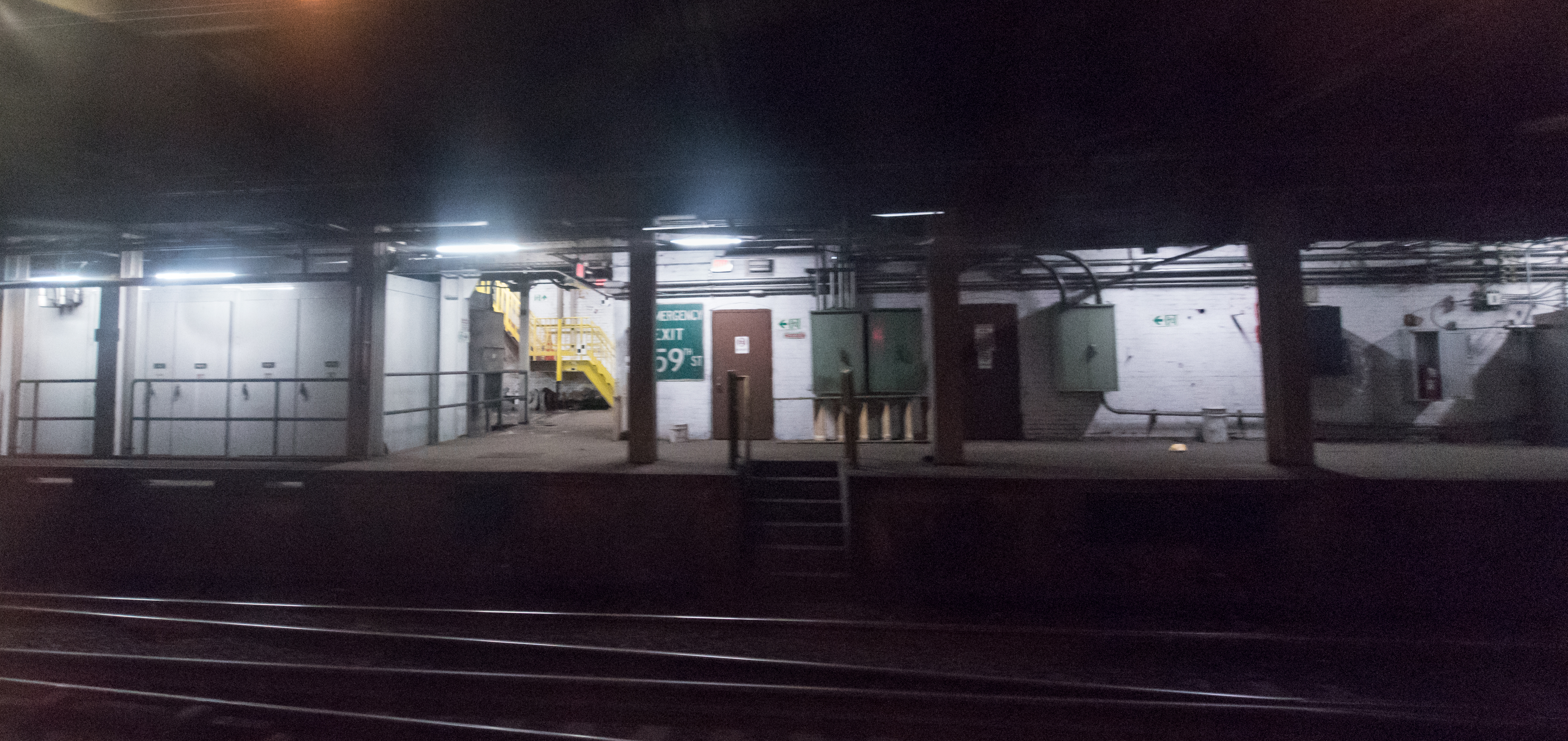
- The unused 59th Street station, 2021

General information
- Location: Park Avenue and 59th Street; Upper East Side, Manhattan, New York
- Coordinates: 40.762941°N 73.969752°W
- Line: Park Avenue Tunnel (Hudson Line)
- Platforms: 2 side platforms
- Tracks: 4
Location

The 59th Street station is a never-opened station in the Park Avenue Tunnel used by the Metro-North Railroad. The station was built by the New York Central & Hudson River Railroad as part of an agreement with the government of New York City during the late 1870s, although trains never stopped here. The station is used as an emergency exit for the Metro-North Railroad.

== History ==
The New York State Legislature passed legislation in 1872, requiring that 4 1/4 miles (7 km) of New York and Harlem Railroad tracks between Grand Central and the Harlem River be placed underground. The confluence of tracks to the north of Grand Central was considered to be the city's "most fearful death-trap" by The New York Times in 1872, and large meetings were held to protest the deaths caused by collisions between trains and pedestrians. The law set up a Board of Engineers to manage the project, which was known as the Fourth Avenue Improvement. The law stated that the authorization for two additional tracks was given "for the purpose of facilitating rapid transit and accommodating local traffic": these tracks were built on the same level, and as part of the project, four local stations were built.

The project's cost was split between the New York Central, run by Commodore Vanderbilt, and New York City, whose payment of $3.2 million was to be made up from increased taxes from future development. The line was sunk into a tunnel between 59th Street and 96th Street through Mount Pleasant, known as the Yorkville Tunnel. The preexisting track level in this section was maintained as the streets crossed over the line via iron bridges. The contract for the section between 79th Street and the Harlem River was awarded to them on November 11. Work on the project began in fall 1872. In December 1872, shafts were sunk at 91st and 93rd Streets and two tunnels were being built alongside the old tunnel. The tunnels were to be completed in September 1873.

On May 3, 1875, the first section of the improvement between 56th Street and 94th Street was placed in full revenue service, running through the cut south of the Yorkville Tunnel. On June 20, the entire improvement opened, and the first trains from Grand Central to the Harlem River were witnessed by large crowds of spectators. That morning, new rails and ties were installed between 96th Street and 33rd Streets, and the old track and trestle were demolished. The first train, the St. Louis Express, due at 12:30 p.m., arrived late at 1:50 p.m. due to the work. Masonry work continued to be done to lengthen the tunnel at Yorkville down to 80th Street, arching over the tracks. The tracks were not yet ballasted, forcing trains to run slowly.

The side tracks to be used for local rapid transit trains were not yet laid, and the passenger stations at 59th Street, 72nd Street, 86th Street, 110th Street and 125th Street were not yet built. At this time, local rapid transit trains were expected to begin operation by September 1875 and were to serve stations yet under construction. The rolling stock for the local trains were to be much lighter than those used on the through trains.

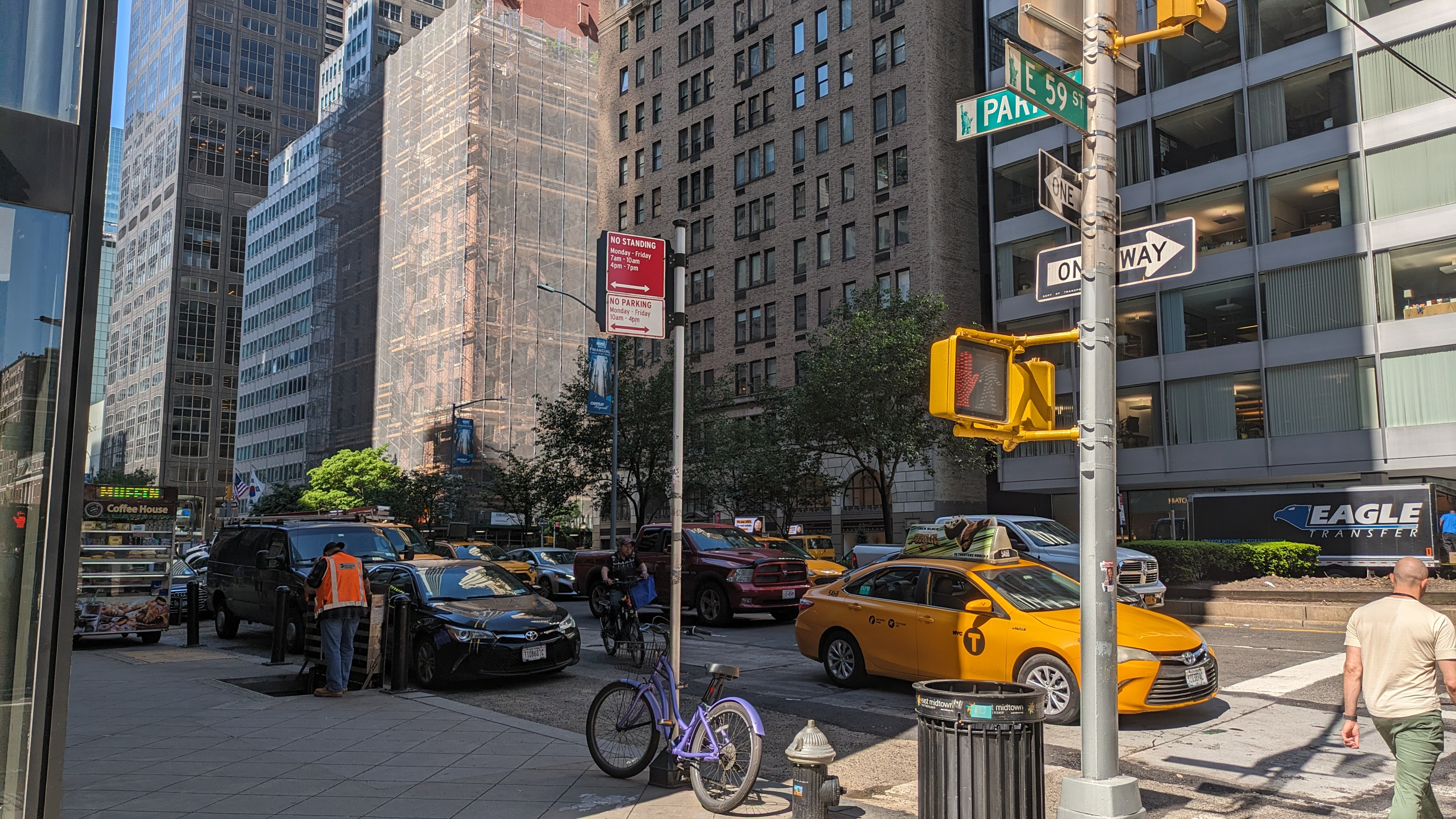
Open hatch leading to the station on the east side of Park Avenue and 59th Street

On May 15, 1876, partial rapid transit began on the Harlem Line, with sixteen trains a day running between Grand Central Depot and William's Bridge. These trains made all stops between Grand Central and William's Bridge, with the exception of Jerome Park, which was skipped by half of trains. This was in addition to eight regular trains per day that stopped at William's Bridge. Two new stations were opened at 86th Street and 110th Street, both being exclusively served by the rapid transit service. However, much to the dissatisfaction of local residents, the 59th Street and 72nd Street stations did not open. With horse cars running on Second Avenue, Third Avenue, and Fourth Avenue, local residents around the 72nd Street station were not willing to go all the way to the 86th Street station. Loud daily complaints were made to William Vanderbilt, urging him to equip these two stations on the line, which was paid in half by the city's taxpayers. A newspaper supposed that the station could be fitted for less than $500 (equivalent to $15,000 in 2025). These stations were all closed by 1906 by approval of the Railroad Commission.

== Station layout ==
The station is located in the Park Avenue Tunnel between 58th Street and 59th Street on the border of Midtown Manhattan and the Upper East Side. The platforms are 12 feet (3.7 m) wide by 150 feet (46 m) long and are located on the outer sides of the tunnel. The station's waiting room, ticket offices, and toilets were located at platform level. At the northern end of each of the waiting rooms, staircases, which are still intact and can be accessed from both sides of Park Avenue, led to 59th Street. The exits to the sidewalk were originally covered with a wooden structure.
