= Harlem station =

Harlem station may refer to the following stations in the United States:

== Illinois ==
- Harlem station (CTA Blue Line O'Hare branch) in Chicago, Illinois
- Harlem station (CTA Blue Line Forest Park branch) in Forest Park, Illinois
- Harlem/Lake station (Green Line), in Oak Park, Illinois
- Harlem Avenue station, a Metra station in Berwyn, Illinois

== New York ==
- Harlem–125th Street station, on the Metro-North Railroad
- 125th Street station (IRT Lexington Avenue Line), on the New York City Subway in East Harlem
- Harlem–148th Street station, on the New York City Subway

== See also ==
- Harlem (disambiguation)
