= 86th Street station (New York Central Railroad) =

Closed train station in Manhattan, New York

86th Street
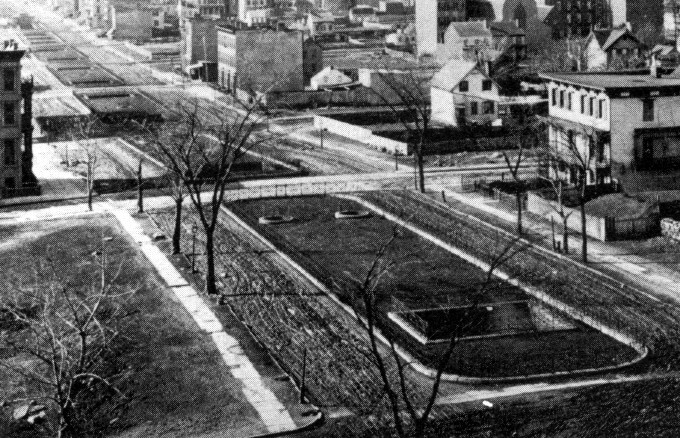
- Park Avenue, 1882–1883, looking south. 86th Street station is in the top left.

General information
- Location: Park Avenue and 86th Street; Upper East Side, Manhattan, New York
- Coordinates: 40.779573°N 73.957688°W
- Line: Park Avenue Tunnel (Hudson Line)
- Platforms: 2 side
- Tracks: 4

History
- Opened: May 15, 1876; 150 years ago
- Closed: c. 1900–1910

Former services
Preceding station	New York Central & Hudson River Railroad	Following station
110th Street toward Chatham	Harlem Division	New York Terminus
110th Street toward Chatham	Harlem Division	72nd Street Limited toward New York
Location

The 86th Street station is an abandoned station located in the Park Avenue Tunnel used by Metro-North Railroad. The station was built by the New York Central & Hudson River Railroad as part of an agreement with New York City. The station was built during the late 19th century. It was located at Park Avenue and 86th Street on the Upper East Side of Manhattan.

== History ==
=== Construction ===
The New York State Legislature passed legislation in 1872, requiring that 4 1/4 miles (7 km) of New York and Harlem Railroad tracks between Grand Central and the Harlem River be placed underground. The confluence of tracks to the north of Grand Central was considered to be the city's "most fearful death-trap" by The New York Times in 1872, and large meetings were held to protest the deaths caused by collisions between trains and pedestrians. The law set up a Board of Engineers to manage the project, which was known as the Fourth Avenue Improvement. The law stated that the authorization for two additional tracks was given "for the purpose of facilitating rapid transit and accommodating local traffic": these tracks were built on the same level, and as part of the project, four local stations were built.

The project's cost was split between the New York Central, run by Commodore Vanderbilt, and New York City, whose payment of $3.2 million was to be made up from increased taxes from future development. The line was sunk into a tunnel between 59th Street and 96th Street through Mount Pleasant, known as the Yorkville Tunnel. The preexisting track level in this section was maintained as the streets crossed over the line via iron bridges. The contract for the section between 79th Street and the Harlem River was awarded to them on November 11. Work on the project began in fall 1872. In December 1872, shafts were sunk at 91st and 93rd Streets and two tunnels were being built alongside the old tunnel. The tunnels were to be completed in September 1873.

On May 3, 1875, the first section of the improvement between 56th Street and 94th Street was placed in full revenue service, running through the cut south of the Yorkville Tunnel. On June 20, the entire improvement opened, and the first trains from Grand Central to the Harlem River were witnessed by large crowds of spectators. That morning, new rails and ties were installed between 96th Street and 33rd Streets, and the old track and trestle were demolished. The first train, the St. Louis Express, due at 12:30 p.m., arrived late at 1:50 p.m. due to the work. Masonry work continued to be done to lengthen the tunnel at Yorkville down to 80th Street, arching over the tracks. The tracks were not yet ballasted, forcing trains to run slowly.

The side tracks to be used for local rapid transit trains were not yet laid, and the passenger stations at 59th Street, 72nd Street, 86th Street, 110th Street and 125th Street were not yet built. At this time, local rapid transit trains were expected to begin operation by September 1875 and were to serve stations yet under construction. The rolling stock for the local trains were to be much lighter than those used on the through trains.

=== Opening ===
This station opened on May 15, 1876 with the introduction of partial rapid transit on the Harlem Line, with sixteen trains a day running between Grand Central Depot and William's Bridge. On the same date, the 110th Street station opened, and both were primarily served by the rapid transit service. While the 110th Street station also was served by trains to Golden's Bridge, 86th Street was exclusively used by Tuckahoe and White Plains locals.

On April 29, 1901, the New York Central was granted permission to abandon this station and the 72nd Street station by the New York State Railroad Commissioners. While the station recorded 13,355 passengers in 1879, it only recorded 3,371 in 1900, even though the station was served by twelve daily trains. The Central had applied for permission to discontinue the two stations as they were operated at a loss, and as it was purported that having trains stop in the tunnel was a threat to public safety. The station was last listed on the May 20, 1901 timetable and was left off the June 23, 1901 timetable. However, an article from 1906 detailing the closure of the 110th Street station noted that many locals stopped at 86th Street.

== Station layout ==
Currently, the station is used as an emergency exit for Metro-North Railroad in the Park Avenue Tunnel. The staircases are intact and can be accessed from the center median of Park Avenue. The station house used to be located in this median, which used to be wider. The layout of this station is different from 59th Street and 72nd Street; the platforms are on the insides of the outer tunnels, between the inner tunnels.

The station platforms were 172 feet (52 m) long, and 18.67 feet (5.69 m) wide. A waiting room was located at the north end of each platform. At the south ends of the platforms staircases led to a mezzanine level where the ticket office was located.
