= Park Avenue main line =

Railroad line in New York City

Coordinates: 40.74856°N 73.98031°W

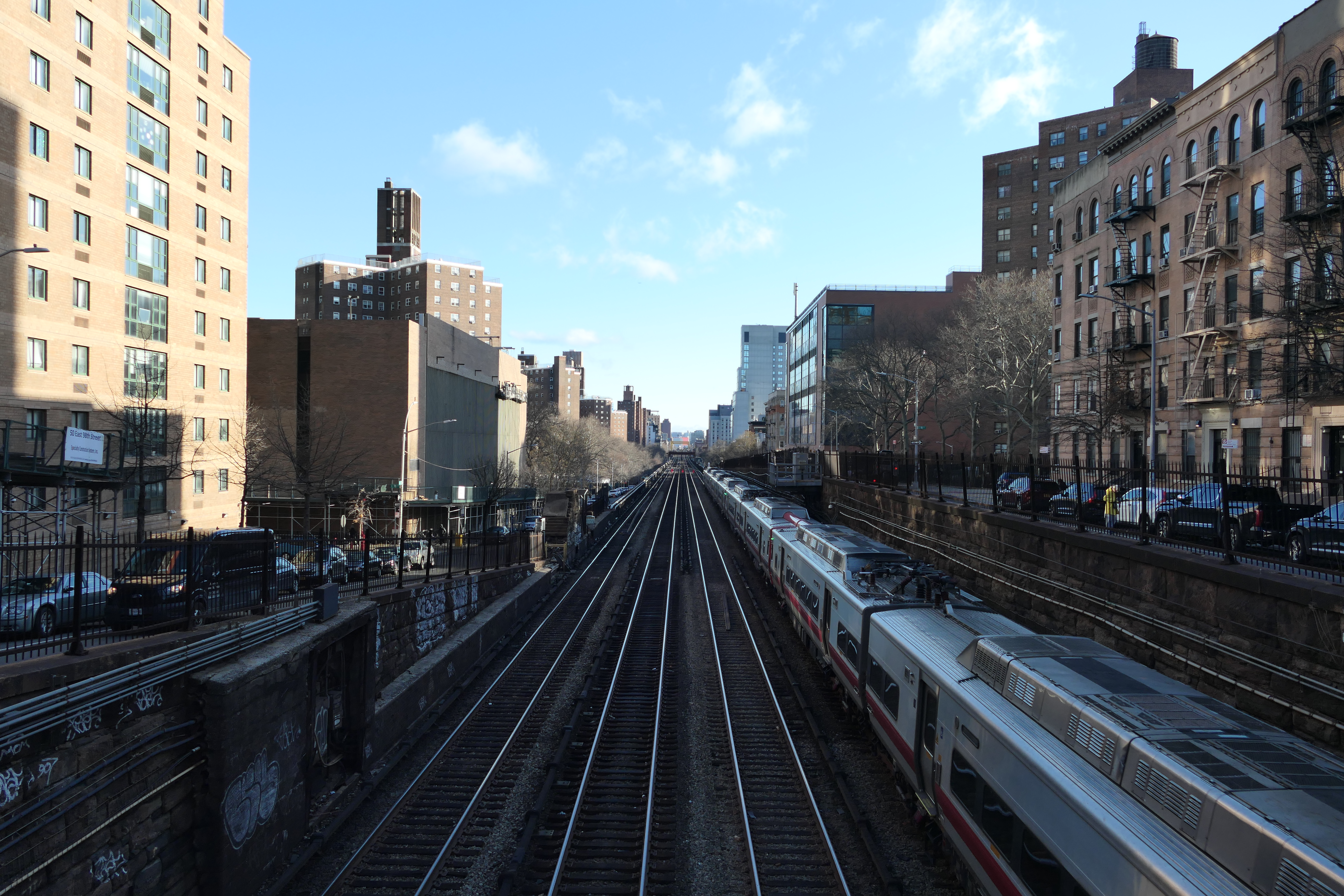
- View of the Park Avenue main line facing north from 97th Street, with a train passing

Overview
- Status: Operational
- Owner: Metro-North Railroad
- Locale: New York City, New York, United States
- Termini: Grand Central Terminal; Mott Haven Junction
- Connecting lines: Harlem Line, Hudson Line, New Haven Line
- Stations: 2

Service
- Type: Commuter rail
- System: Metro-North Railroad
- Operator: Metro-North Railroad

History
- Work began: 1831 (street railway)
- Completed: 1875 (Yorkville Tunnel)

Technical
- Number of tracks: 4
- Character: Underground and elevated
- Track gauge: 4 ft 8 1/2 in (1,435 mm) standard gauge
- Electrification: Third rail, 750 V DC
- Operating speed: 45 mph (72 km/h)

The Park Avenue main line, which consists of the Park Avenue Tunnel and the Park Avenue Viaduct, is a railroad line in the New York City borough of Manhattan, running entirely along Park Avenue. The line carries four tracks of the Metro-North Railroad as a tunnel from Grand Central Terminal at 42nd Street to a portal at 97th Street, where it rises to a viaduct north of 99th Street and continues over the Harlem River into the Bronx over the Park Avenue Bridge. During rush hours, Metro-North uses three of the four tracks in the peak direction.

Originally constructed in the mid-19th century as a New York and Harlem Railroad route, the Park Avenue main line was initially a street railroad and ran to what is now Lower Manhattan. It was gradually truncated through the 1860s, until Grand Central Depot was opened at 42nd Street in 1871. The line was placed in a grade-separated structure in the late 19th century, as part of the Fourth Avenue and Park Avenue Improvement projects, and was electrified in the first decade of the 20th century as part of the construction of Grand Central Terminal. Since then, several improvement and rehabilitation projects have been made along the main line. From 2023 to 2026, the Metropolitan Transportation Authority (MTA) carried out a major project to replace the viaduct north of 99th Street.

== Line description ==
The Park Avenue main line originates at Grand Central Terminal to the south, which is located at 42nd Street. It consists of various train yards and interlockings between 42nd and 59th Streets consisting of 47 tracks between 45th and 51st Streets, 10 tracks from 51st to 57th Streets, and then finally narrows to four tracks at 59th Street. At this section, known as the Grand Central Trainshed, the surrounding streets are suspended over the Park Avenue line via various viaducts.

The line runs in two parallel tunnels from 59th to 97th Streets, with each tunnel carrying two tracks. Initially, the line enters fully-enclosed brick tunnels between 67th and 71st Streets, and later between 80th and 96th Streets. The remainder of this segment is located in a beam tunnel structure; the roof of the tunnel is supported on I-beams, and the cross-streets are carried on steel-beam bridges. The tunnels have a vertical clearance of 15 feet 1 inch (4.60 m) above the running rails. At 97th Street, the line rises onto a viaduct and continues above the median of Park Avenue until it reaches 132nd Street. There, the line crosses the Park Avenue Bridge, a vertical lift bridge, and traverses the Harlem River. The line continues into the Bronx, where it diverges into the Hudson Line and the Harlem Line.

Internally, the Metropolitan Transportation Authority (MTA) refers to the entirety of the Park Avenue main line's tracks as part of the Hudson Line. According to this internal designation, the Harlem and New Haven Lines merge into the Hudson Line in the Bronx, and the Hudson Line is the only line that continues into Grand Central Terminal.

== History ==
=== Street railway ===
The Harlem Line in its current form originated from the New York and Harlem Railroad (NY&H), which was the first streetcar company in the United States and in the world. It was franchised on April 25, 1831, to run between the original city core in Lower Manhattan to the suburb of Harlem, several miles to the north on Manhattan Island. The railroad's charter allowed the line to run between 23rd Street and any point on the Harlem River between Eighth and Third Avenues, with a branch running to the Hudson River, encompassing most of the island. The company initially had a stock limit of $350,000 (equivalent to $10,582,000 in 2025).

While the NY&H wanted to run the line as a steam line, the city made it use horse power south of 14th Street. On September 13, 1831, the Board of Directors of the railroad approved its route along Fourth Avenue (later renamed Park Avenue) from 23rd Street to the Harlem River. On April 6, 1832, the railroad's charter was amended to allow the line to be extended south to 14th Street.

On May 2, 1832, the City Common Council secretly granted the NY&H the right to lay track along Broadway to City Hall and Bowling Green. The general public objected once it found out, and a fraudulent map was circulated at the time, showing that the railroad would take up 23 feet (7.0 m) of the street when it really would only take up 5 feet (1.5 m). Newspaper editors also objected to the railroad's plan. In spring 1833, the railroad published a pamphlet titled "A Statement of Facts in Relation to the Origin, Progress, and Prospects of the New-York and Harlem Railroad Company" to refute objections to its plan. On March 1, 1833, a meeting was held in Tammany Hall concerning the issue. At the meeting, cabdrivers and cab owners came out against the railroad. After the meeting, the crowd tore up some of the railroad's track and the council withdrew its Broadway agreement with the railroad. The NY&H was eventually extended downtown in 1839, but along a different route.

Ground was broken on the NY&H's construction on February 23, 1832, at Murray Hill on Fourth Avenue. At the ceremony, Vice President of the railroad John Mason hinted at the railroad's ambitions, saying that while the railroad's principal objective was local, its higher importance was to get to Albany. In 1832, the New York State Legislature authorized the company to raise its stock limit to $500,000 on the condition that the line be completed to the Harlem River by 1835. That November, two horsecars—"John Mason" and "President"—built by John Stephenson were ready for operation, both of which were named after John Mason, who had become the railroad's president in August.

On April 27, 1837, an act was passed in the State Legislature to widen Fourth Avenue between 32nd Street and the Harlem River to provide room for the railroad. The street was widened by 20 feet (6.1 m) on either side, making the street 140 feet (43 m) wide. The company ceded the title for the land that would be occupied by Fourth Avenue to the city in exchange for permission to occupy it. In that same year, the railroad purchased six city lots at Fourth Avenue and 26th Street for $7,000, for the construction of car barns and stables. A tunnel stretching 596 feet (182 m) was completed through Prospect Hill, one of the highest points on the East Side of Manhattan, between modern 92nd Street and 95th Street, in 1837. The New York City Landmarks Preservation Commission claims that this is the oldest railroad tunnel in the United States.

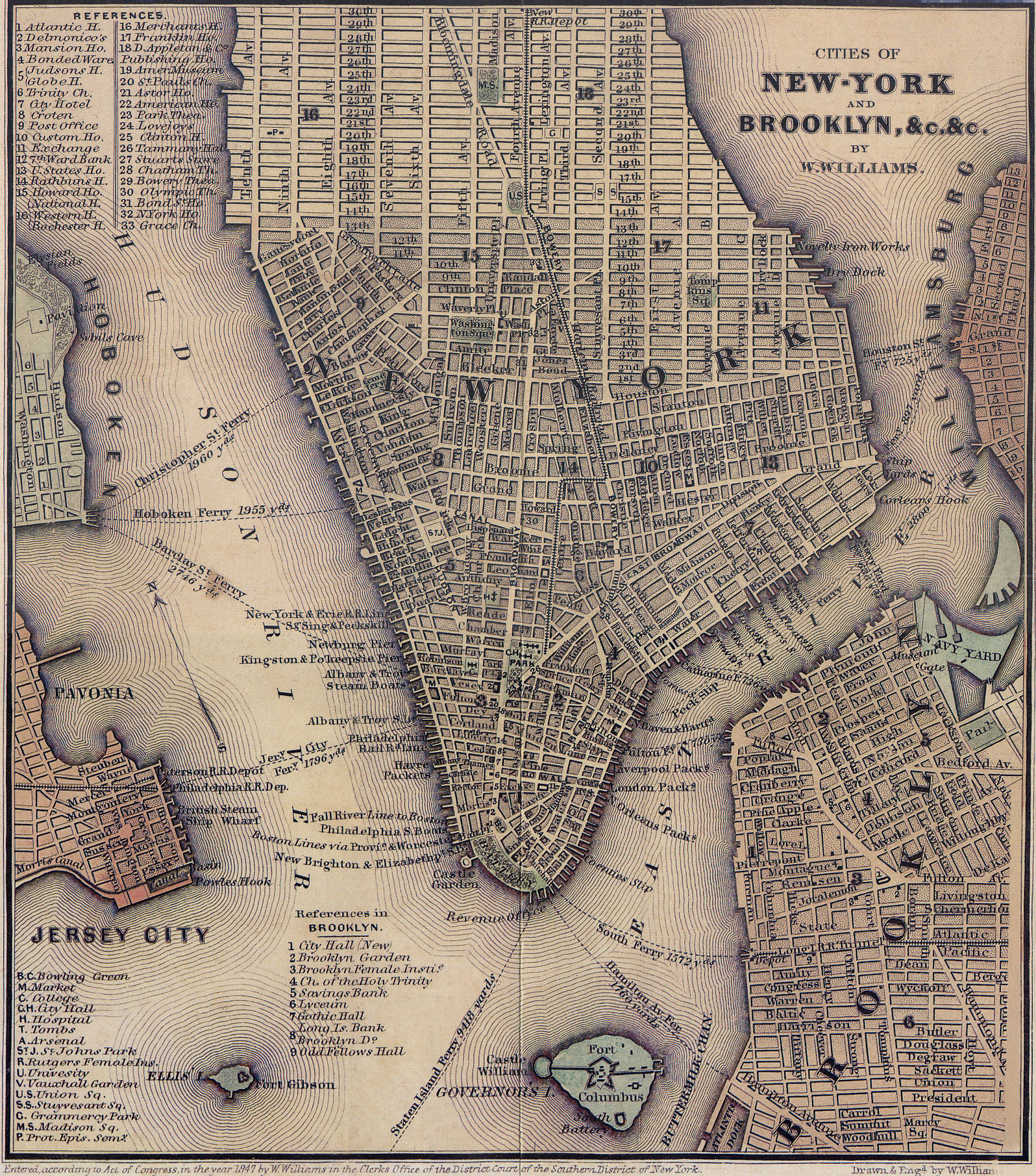
An 1847 map of Lower Manhattan; the only railroad in Manhattan at that time was the New York and Harlem Railroad

The first section of the NY&H, along Bowery from Prince Street north to 14th Street, consisting of .85 miles (1.37 km), opened to the public on November 26, 1832. (Note: On that day, a demonstration showing the car's braking ability was conducted, but one horsecar inadvertently rear-ended another with no serious injuries. This might have been the first rear-end collision in the United States.) Service was then extended northward along Fourth Avenue to 32nd Street on June 10, 1833. Work on the Murray Hill rock cut began in autumn, 1833 and was completed in 1834, and service along a 4.432 miles (7.133 km)-long segment to 85th Street in Yorkville opened on May 1, 1834. Service ran every 15 minutes between 5 a.m. and 8 p.m., and ran every 60 minutes to 10 p.m.. A one-way fare cost 12.5 cents. Service was extended 2 miles (3.2 km) north, finally reaching Harlem—then a small suburb—on October 26, 1837, with the Yorkville Tunnel constructed to reach this point.

Service then extended further south. On May 4, 1839, the line was extended south along The Bowery, Broome Street and Centre Street to City Hall, at Centre Street and Park Row. Service was extended south on November 26, 1852, along Park Row to Astor House at Park Row and Broadway. In 1851, work began to convert the Murray Hill rock cut into a tunnel, and in October of that year the City Common Council ordered that a 40 feet (12 m)-wide planted median be installed atop the tunnel between 34th Street and 38th Street. Real estate developers who purchased adjacent lots named this section of Fourth Avenue Park Avenue, which would later be applied to the remainder of the street. The development of the area increased once the rock cut was decked-over.

On October 6, 1871, the depot used by the NY&H was changed from 26th Street and Fourth Avenue to Grand Central Depot, at 42nd Street. Since there were originally no grade-separated crossings of the railroads between 42nd and 59th Streets, there were frequent accidents; seven people died within 12 days of the move to Grand Central.

On April 1, 1873, the NY&H was leased for 401 years to the New York Central and Hudson River Railroad (later New York Central Railroad). The line then became the Harlem Division of the New York Central. The lease did not include the portion of the line using horse cars. Horse cars were replaced with an underground trolley system in 1897, when it was leased to the Metropolitan Street Railway Company.

=== Fourth Avenue Improvement ===
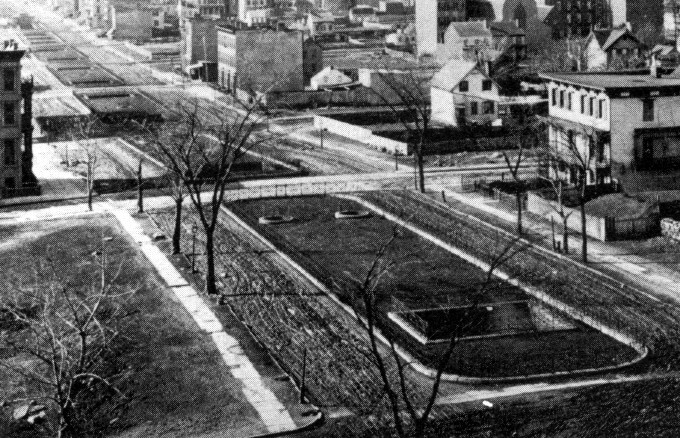
Park Avenue, 1882–1883

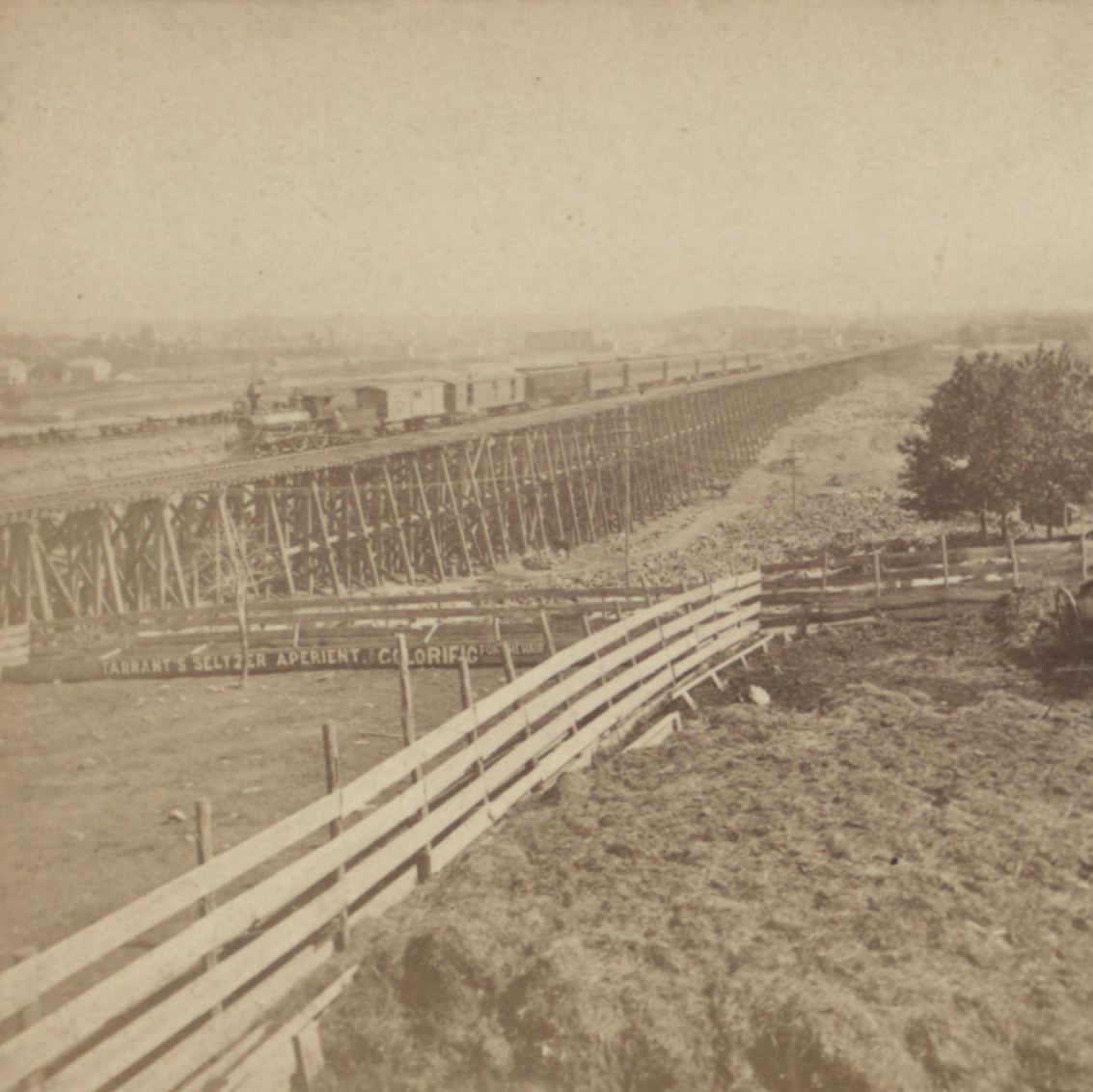
Work in progress on the Fourth Avenue Improvement with a train passing on the trestle.

The confluence of tracks to the north of Grand Central was considered to be the city's "most fearful death-trap" by The New York Times in 1872, and large meetings were held to protest the deaths caused by collisions between trains and pedestrians. The New York State Legislature passed legislation in 1872, requiring that 4 1/4 miles (7 km) of NY&H tracks between Grand Central and the Harlem River be placed underground. The law set up a Board of Engineers to manage the project, which was known as the Fourth Avenue Improvement. The law stated that the authorization for two additional tracks was given "for the purpose of facilitating rapid transit and accommodating local traffic": these tracks were built on the same level and, as part of the project, four local stations were built.

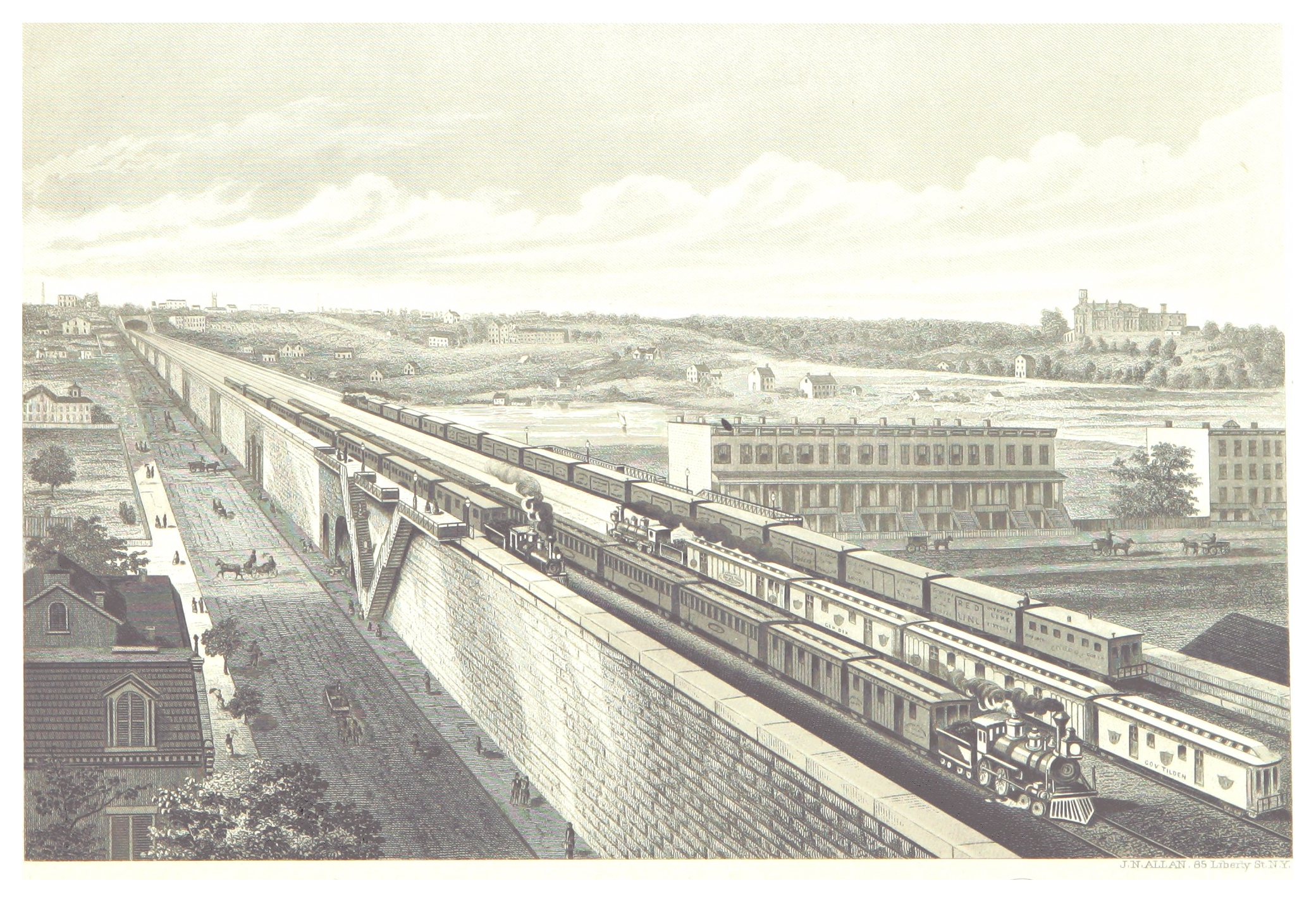
A view of the new grade-separated line on a viaduct through the Harlem Flats in 1876.

The project's cost was split between the New York Central, run by Commodore Vanderbilt, and New York City, whose payment of $3.2 million was to be recouped from increased taxes on future development. The project was divided into three sections: 45th Street to 49th Street, 49th Street to 79th Street, and 79th Street to the Harlem River. The line was sunk into a tunnel between 59th Street and 96th Street through Mount Pleasant, known as the Yorkville Tunnel. The 4,563-foot (1,391 m)-long section in the Harlem flats between 98th Street and midway between 115th and 116th Streets was built as a stone viaduct, and reached its highest point at 114th Street. The stone viaduct adjoined earth embankments.

To the north of this section, from 125th Street to 130th Street at the Harlem River, the line was constructed below-grade. Arched brick tunnels were built wherever sufficient room allowed for it. Beam tunnels were constructed where the headway was too small for an arched tunnel, and, where room did not allow for that, open cuts were constructed. The 550 feet (170 m) rock tunnels were built between 92nd Street and the north side of 94th Street. Between 48th Street and 56th Street, the line was placed into a shallow open cut. To allow people and vehicles to cross over the rail line, eight pedestrian bridges were built over the line between 45th Street and 56th Street, and vehicular overpasses were built at 45th Street and 48th Street. To cover the frequent openings between 50th Street and 96th Street for ventilation, the roadway's center was landscaped and fenced-off. These malls were narrowed significantly in the early 1930s to accommodate additional lanes of traffic. These malls and the street's great width distinguish the street above, and contribute to Park Avenue's identity as a sought-after residential address.

Work on the project began in fall, 1872. The first contract was awarded to Fairchild and Ward and the Watson Manufacturing Company for the section between 45th Street and 49th Street. The preexisting track level in this section was maintained as the streets crossed over the line via iron bridges. The project north of 48th Street was completed by Dillon, Clyde & Company, which submitted the winning bid of $6,395,070 (equivalent to $171,868,000 in 2025). The contract for the project had been awarded on August 1, 1872. The contract for the section between 79th Street and the Harlem River was awarded to them on November 11. On January 14, 1873, the contract for the work between 49th Street and 79th Street was awarded to Dillon, Clyde & Company, which provided the only bid lower than that expected by the New York City Board of Estimate. The contract called for the project's completion in two years. This section had been put up for bid, but, since none of the bids were satisfactory, the bidding process was reopened.

To allow NY&H trains to continue running during the project's construction, the tracks between 120th Street and the Harlem River were moved to the east side of the river. On January 5, 1873, the tracks between 116th Street and 120th Street were moved from the center of Fourth Avenue to the east side. In December 1872, shafts were sunk at 91st and 93rd Streets and two tunnels were being built alongside the old tunnel. The tunnels were to be completed in September 1873. A temporary trestle bridge was constructed from 97th Street to 120th Street for $85,000. In May 1873, temporary tracks were placed on the west side of Fourth Avenue; trains went over Lenox Hill instead of through the tunnel.

In June 1874, New York City Mayor William Frederick Havemeyer refused to sign warrants in payment for the project, as he believed that the Legislature's act was unconstitutional. He had signed the warrants until this point, when 2/3 of the work was completed. On May 3, 1875, the first section of the improvement between 56th Street and 94th Street was placed in full revenue service, running through the cut south of the Yorkville Tunnel. On June 20, the entire improvement opened, and the first trains from Grand Central to the Harlem River were witnessed by large crowds of spectators. That morning, new rails and ties were installed between 96th Street and 33rd Streets, and the old tracks and trestle were demolished. The first train, the St. Louis Express, due at 12:30 p.m., arrived late at 1:50 p.m. due to the work. Masonry work continued to be done to lengthen the tunnel at Yorkville down to 80th Street, arching over the tracks. The tracks were not yet ballasted, forcing trains to run slowly. The side tracks to be used for local rapid transit trains were not yet laid, and the passenger stations at 59th Street, 72nd Street, 86th Street, 110th Street and 125th Street were not yet built. At this time, local rapid transit trains were expected to begin operation by September 1875 and were to serve stations yet under construction. The rolling stock for the local trains were to be much lighter than those used on the through trains.

In January 1876, a test case went on trial in New York Supreme Court, brought by Charles Higham against the NY&H and a contractor for injuries to his business that resulted from obstructions raised by construction on the project. During the trial, the NY&H was dismissed as a defendant. The case was decided on July 6, 1877, and it was determined that the contractor could use the street and roadway to complete its work, but only if it were necessary. Higham won the case, but only received minimal compensation.

On May 15, 1876, partial rapid transit began on the Harlem Line, with sixteen trains a day running between Grand Central Depot and William's Bridge. These trains made all stops between Grand Central and William's Bridge, with the exception of Jerome Park, which was skipped by half the trains. This was in addition to eight regular trains per day that stopped at William's Bridge. Two new stations were opened at 86th Street and 110th Street, both being exclusively served by the rapid transit service. However, much to the dissatisfaction of local residents, the 59th Street and 72nd Street stations did not open. With horse cars running on Second Avenue, Third Avenue and Fourth Avenue, local residents around the 72nd Street station were not willing to go all the way to the 86th Street station. Loud daily complaints were made to William H. Vanderbilt, President of the NY&H, urging him to equip these two stations on the line, half of which was paid for by the city's taxpayers. A newspaper supposed that the station could be fitted for less than $500 (equivalent to $15,000 in 2025). He was also criticized for charging ten cents to get between Harlem and 42nd Street in addition to six cents to use the horsecars to get to City Hall Park: more than the parallel Third Avenue Elevated, which charged six cents. These stations were all closed by 1906 by approval of the Railroad Commission.

=== Proposed extension to City Hall ===
In 1872, the New York City Rapid Transit Company was chartered, authorizing Vanderbilt to build and operate a two-track extension of the line from Grand Central to City Hall Park, connecting with the existing line between 48th Street and 59th Street. The line would have run from Broadway's east side at City Hall Park east to Chatham or Centre Street; then to Park Street, Mott Street, the Bowery, Third Avenue and Fourth Avenue to connect with the existing line between 48th Street and 59th Street. While Cornelius Vanderbilt had originally indicated his intent to continue the underground line to City Hall, there was speculation that he did not intend to build the section south of 42nd Street. The Superintendent Engineer of the project, Isaac Buckhout, said that he had been receiving proposals for the project and that all surveys for it had been completed by January 1873. The estimated cost of the project made by Buckout came to be $9.1 million. William Henry Vanderbilt stated that the line would not be as dark as the Metropolitan Railway (now part of the London Underground), and that there would be stations every eight blocks, or every .4 miles (0.64 km). In January 1873, he expected the cost of the work to City Hall to be $8 to 10 million, and that the whole project would be completed by January 1, 1875. The line was expected to have 400,000 daily passengers, and trains would have traversed the line from City Hall to Grand Central in 12 minutes, and from there to the Harlem River in 10 minutes.

According to a prominent officer of the New York Central, a member of the Board of Directors, Commodore Cornelius Vanderbilt had fully intended to extend the underground steam railroad to City Hall, and had plans drawn and ready to be executed. His son, William H. Vanderbilt, objected to the plan after returning from London, and, having ridden on the Metropolitan Railway, believed that the public would not tolerate riding in a dark tunnel. Commodore Vanderbilt decided not to build the line due to public criticism for the grant, opposition to the project from business people and homeowners in the Bowery, and because of the Panic of 1873.

In April 1877, the New York City Board of Alderman passed a resolution requesting that Commissioner Campbell assess the feasibility of constructing an underground line from City Hall to the existing line by private enterprise. The Commissioner was strongly in support of such a plan, and predicted that such a line would have a daily ridership of 100,000, would make $1.8 million annually and would cost $9 to 10 million to build–in his mind, a financial success. William H. Vanderbilt was criticized for not following-through on the plans of his father to extend the line to City Hall.

In 1880, the New York Tunnel Railway was incorporated to construct a railroad from Washington Square Park under Wooster Street and University Street to 13th Street, and then under Fourth Avenue and 42nd Street to connect to the Fourth Avenue Improvement. On October 2, 1895, the Central Tunnel Company, the New-York and New-Jersey Tunnel Railroad Company and the Terminal Underground Railroad Company of New York were consolidated into the Underground Railroad Company of the City of New York. Together, they planned to build a line running from City Hall Park to the Fourth Avenue Improvement. The line would have run north under Chambers Street and Reade Street, before going up Elm Street to Spring Street, Marion Street and Mulberry Streets; continuing through Great Jones Street, Lafayette Place, Astor Place and Eighth Street; then under Ninth Street to Fourth Avenue, before heading under 42nd Street to Grand Central Depot to connect with the Fourth Avenue Improvement. The line would have had three connecting branches.

=== Park Avenue Improvement ===
In 1888, the United States Department of War began work on the Harlem River to allow for unrestricted shipping activity between the Hudson River and the East River and through the new Harlem River Ship Canal at 225th Street. The New York Central was opposed to the project as the increase in river traffic would interfere with its rail line, which was only 8 feet (2.4 m) above the water. In 1890, the New York and Northern Railway, a competitor of the New York Central which operated freight traffic to the Bronx shoreline and which relied upon barges to ship its freight, complained to the Department of War about delays to its traffic due to the New York Central's low bridge. To remedy the situation, the Central could have raised the bridge to 24 feet (7.3 m) above the water to satisfy the Department of War, allowing most vessels to cross under the bridge, for $300,000, or replaced it with a tunnel to satisfy the Harlem community for $3 million. The railroad opted to raise the bridge, which was the only four-track drawbridge in the country at the time, but, due to political pressure, it had to raise the grade of its line north of 115th Street on a viaduct, raising the project's cost significantly. In 1892, a law was passed establishing the Board of Park Avenue Improvement, and under the terms of the law, New York City was to pay for half of the project, with the remainder paid for by the New York Central. The members of the board were appointed by the Mayor of New York City. The details of the plan, titled the Park Avenue Improvement, were given by the New York Central in April 1893, at which point they were almost completed.

The new bridge was to be 400 feet (120 m)-long and was built for about $500,000 by the King Bridge Company. The new bridge was to be 17 feet (5.2 m) higher than the old bridge, as mandated by the Federal Government, making it 24 feet (7.3 m) above the water. The Park Avenue Line's grade had to be raised to allow it to reach the higher bridge; as a result, a new four-track steel viaduct was built between 132nd Street and 106th Street. Between 110th Street and 106th Street, the steel viaduct was to be placed atop the preexisting masonry retaining walls and fill. Between 115th Street and 130th Street, the viaduct was set to replace the open cut structure completed in 1875. Since the line was to be raised on a viaduct, the stone viaducts and the bridges crossing it could be removed. The 110th Street, 125th Street and Mott Haven stations were to be elevated as part of the project. The station at 110th Street was rebuilt within the stone viaduct, making it 11 feet (3.4 m) higher than it was previously. The railroad had threatened to eliminate the 125th Street stop after neighboring property owners threatened to sue, thereby delaying construction.

During the course of construction, trains were to run over a temporary wooden structure along with a temporary two-track wooden drawbridge. The cost of the entire project was to be $2 million (equivalent to $74,423,000 in 2025). At the time, construction was expected to begin on September 1, 1893. The work was divided into four sections. The bridge's design was underway in 1894 and, in February of that year, the project was expected to be completed in December 1895. Service continued to operate while the complex work proceeded through a procedure involving the installation of temporary wooden trestles, trusses, and the installation of columns.

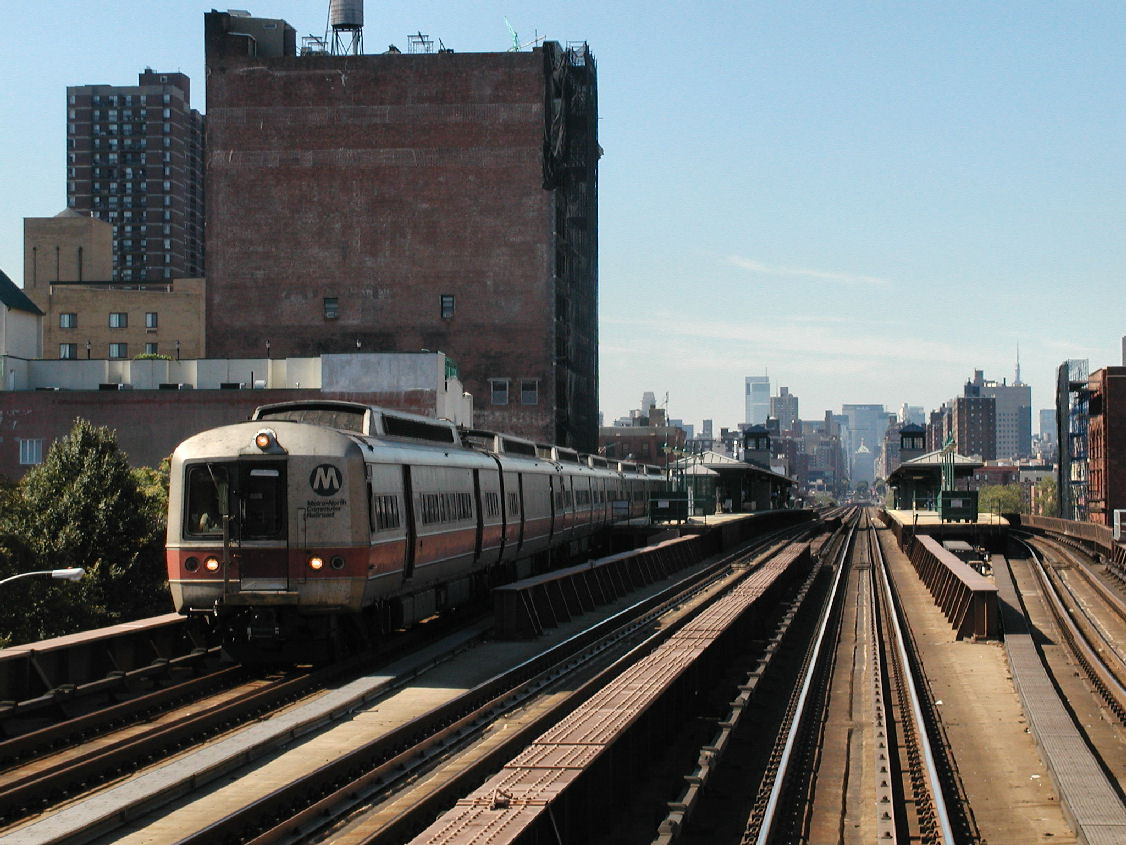
A view of the 125th Street station, which opened in 1897 as part of the Park Avenue Improvement.

On February 15, 1897, trains on the Harlem Division started running over the new drawbridge over the Harlem River and the elevated structure connecting to it. The Department of War ordered that the bridge could not be opened during peak hours: between 7 and 10 a.m. and 4 and 7 p.m. First, a connection was made between the new tracks and the old tracks between 115th Street and 116th Street. At 117th Street, the temporary tracks used the old viaduct, going under the new structure to 125th Street. Later on, the old and temporary work was removed. Two of the four tracks were not yet built between the bridge and 149th Street, since the space was occupied by a temporary structure. The grade crossing at 138th Street was eliminated as part of the project. On October 15, 1897, a spacious new station in Harlem was opened at 125th Street, replacing a small station in the old Park Avenue open cut located between 125th Street and 126th Street. The new station was built atop the old open cut and directly under the new Park Avenue Viaduct. The station was 30 feet (9.1 m) higher than the old one. The platforms, which were built on the viaduct, were built to be 400 feet (120 m) long. Unlike the old station, which was a local stop, the new station was constructed with two island platforms to allow express trains to stop, with the local tracks curving outwards to make room for them. The station was designed by architect Morgan O'Brien and consisted of three levels: the basement, containing a section of the old cut not filled in; a waiting room at street level; and the elevated platforms. The original station platforms were discovered in the basement level in 1988, as the current station was set to be renovated.

On April 29, 1901, the New York Central was granted permission to abandon the 86th Street and 72nd Street stations by the New York State Board of Railroad Commissioners. The 86th Street station was last listed on the May 20, 1901 timetable and was left off the June 23, 1901 timetable. The New York Central applied to the New York State Board of Railroad Commissioners for permission to discontinue service at the 110th Street station on April 24, 1906. The Board granted the Central permission on May 9 to close the station on June 1. However, it closed on June 17.

=== Electrification ===
As train traffic to Grand Central increased dramatically at the end of the 19th century, the operation of steam locomotives in the tunnel resulted in both an extremely unpleasant experience for riders and a dangerously-low level of visibility for train engineers, due to smoke from the engines. William J. Wilgus, chief engineer of the New York Central, had proposed electrifying the New York Central lines to Grand Central in 1899, using an electric third rail power system devised by Frank J. Sprague. Though Wilgus's plan was approved, it was not then carried out due to a lack of funding.

On January 8, 1902, a southbound train overran signals in the smoky Park Avenue Tunnel and collided with another southbound train, killing 15 people and injuring more than 30 others. This crash directly resulted in the construction of the modern-day Grand Central Terminal. A week after the crash, New York Central president William H. Newman announced that all of the railroad's suburban lines to Grand Central would be electrified, and the approach to the station would be put underground. The New York state legislature subsequently passed a law to ban all steam trains in Manhattan beginning on July 1, 1908. By December 1902, as part of an agreement with the city, New York Central agreed to put the approach to Grand Central Station from 46th to 59th Streets in an open cut under Park Avenue, and to upgrade the tracks to accommodate electric trains. Overpasses would be built across the open cut at most of the cross-streets.

Following Newman's pledge to electrify New York Central rail lines, plans to electrify the Park Avenue line and replace the then-overcrowded Grand Central Depot were announced. In March 1903, Wilgus presented a more-detailed proposal to the New York Central board, describing a modern railroad terminal with separate levels for commuter and intercity railroads, among other things. Wilgus' plan was approved, and subsequently Grand Central Depot was demolished in phases and replaced with the current Beaux Arts-style Grand Central Terminal, in 1913. As part of the project, the rail yard and the approach from 59th Street were placed underground and electrified. Electric locomotives were placed in regular passenger service in January 1907.

The New York Central Railroad tested third-rail-powered electric trains in 1904, using a fleet of new MU Sprague-GE cars from the General Electric Company, and found that their speeds were adequate for service into Grand Central. Over the next few years, the New York Central and New Haven Railroads electrified their tracks, allowing trains to enter Grand Central Terminal upon its completion. The first electric train departed for the soon-to-be-demolished Grand Central Depot from the Harlem Division's High Bridge station in the Bronx, on September 30, 1906. By late 1906, Harlem Division trains were also electrified, and its operations moved to the basement of Grand Central Palace. New Haven Division electric trains started running to Grand Central in October 1907.

With the elimination of the noise and pollution from steam locomotives, this once-undesirable section of Park Avenue and the land freed by the covering-over of the rail yard became prime New York City real estate. The area became one of the city's most attractive residential areas as mansions and high-class apartments were constructed along Park Avenue. The area around Park Avenue in the vicinity of Grand Central was developed into Terminal City. Stretching from 42nd to 51st Streets between Madison and Lexington Avenues, it came to include the Chrysler Building and other prestigious office buildings; luxury apartment houses along Park Avenue, including the Park Avenue Historic District; and an array of high-end hotels that included the Marguery, Park Lane and Waldorf Astoria. The idea to place the rail yard below Park Avenue and construct buildings above it was credited to Wilgus.

In November 1929, the New York Central prepared to install bidirectional signaling and shorten signal blocks between Grand Central and 162nd Street on the Harlem Division and High Bridge on the Hudson Division, allowing all four tracks in the Park Avenue Tunnel to be used in either direction. At the time, only Track 4, the westernmost track, had bidirectional signaling; it was used by outbound trains in the evening rush hour. The change would increase capacity by 25% and allow trains to operate at least 90 seconds apart at a speed of 35 miles per hour (56 km/h). The additional capacity was needed to accommodate growth in suburban communities and additional traffic to new skyscrapers near 42nd Street. Semaphore signals composed of pivoted arms were replaced with tricolor signals resembling traffic lights. The interlocking tower at 106th Street was rebuilt and ten new signal bridges were erected between 96th Street and the Harlem River. In addition, the line was rebuilt at Mott Haven Junction, with nine tracks instead of the existing five, and four signal towers in the area were replaced with one. The changes at the junction were made to increase operational flexibility and allow trains to go 30 miles per hour (48 km/h) through this section. In 1930, work on the section of the project between Grand Central and Mott Haven Junction was nearly-completed.

In 1931, the New York Central completed the installation of bidirectional signaling between 59th Street and Mott Haven Junction and the consolidation of four interlockings at Mott Haven Junction.

On September 11, 1931, Manhattan Borough President Samuel Levy proposed placing the elevated portion of the line between 96th Street and the Harlem River in a tunnel to reduce train delays and improve property values. He estimated that the project would cost $200 million, and suggested that the city and the New York Central split the cost.

On December 21, 1937, the local boards of the Murray Hill and Hell Gate Districts initiated proceedings to cover the portion of the line between 96th Street and 97th Street and install landscaping and fences. The project, which was estimated to cost $33,770, was completed in 1941, creating the only median on Park Avenue with a pedestrian path and seating.

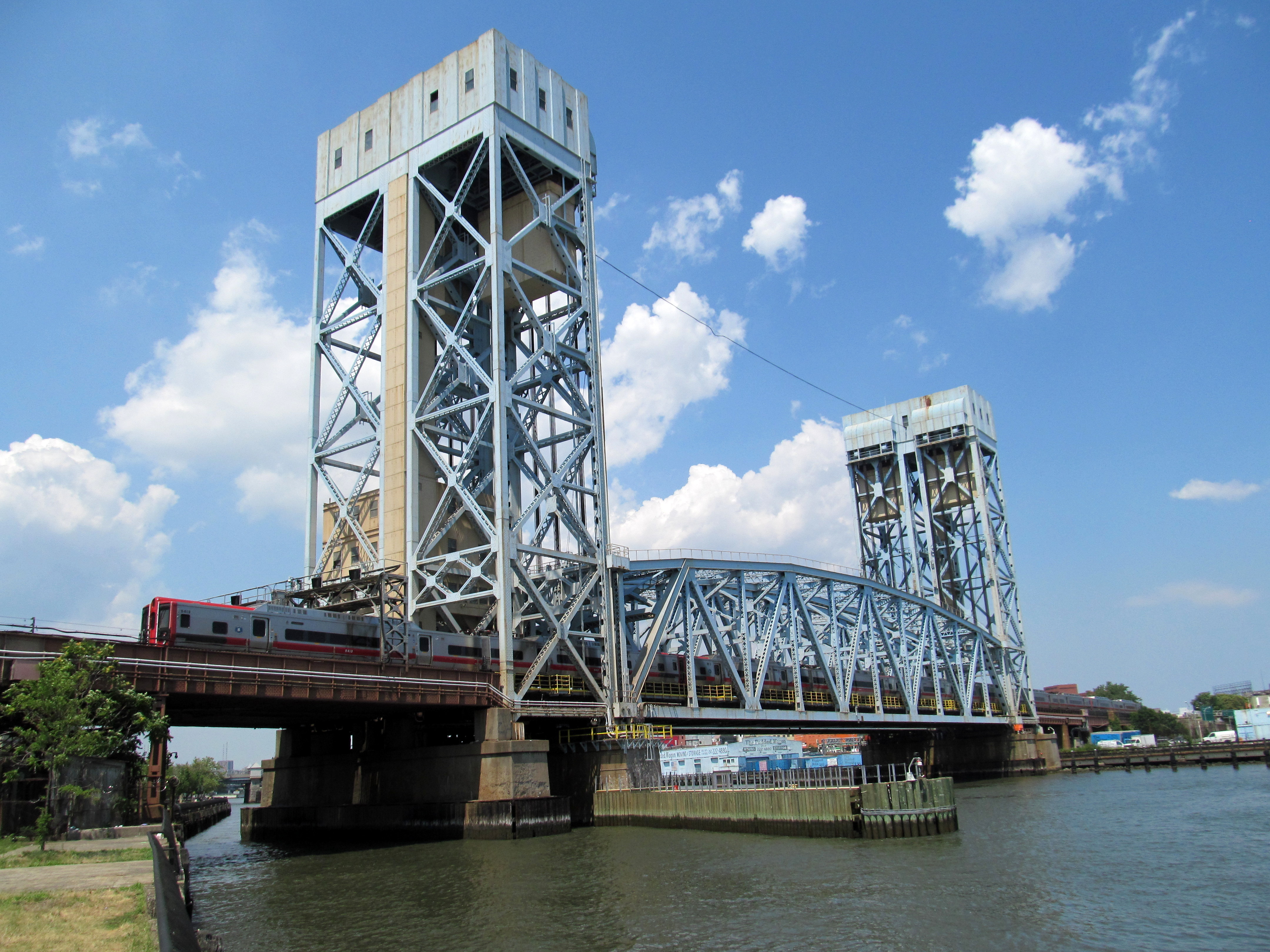
A New Haven Line train of M8 cars on the Park Avenue Bridge in July 2014

On April 23, 1951, the New York Central announced that work replacing the swing bridge over the Harlem River with a vertical lift bridge would begin on May 1, and that it would be completed in 1954. The new bridge was constructed 50 feet (15 m) to the west of the existing bridge, and consisted of two 340 foot (100 m) spans, each carrying two tracks. Each of the spans had its own 219 foot (67 m) tower and lift machinery so that service could continue if either set of lift machinery stalled while its span was raised. The new bridge reduced the time needed to allow ships to pass from nine minutes to four minutes.

The first track on a new lift bridge over the Harlem River was placed into service on November 28, 1954. Before the track could be put into service, track crews worked around-the-clock to connect the bridge track with track on either side of the span at 138th Street and 131st Street, and performed comprehensive power and signal tests. At the time, the second track, also on the west side of the new bridge, was expected to be placed into service within the following two weeks. A year later, the two remaining tracks on the east side of the new bridge would go into service. In the interim, service was to be provided using two tracks on the new bridge and two tracks on the old bridge. On August 9, 1956, the largest stone and concrete pier of the old bridge was removed through the use of explosives.

Following the completion of the new bridge, New York City raised property taxes from the New York Central for the bridge from $69,666 to $381,121 for Fiscal Year 1955, and for the Park Avenue Tunnel from $1,263,378 to $2,759,036. In response to the tax hike, New York Central President Alfred E. Perlman stated that the city was trying to run the company out of town by making its operations unprofitable. As a result of the massive increase, on September 10, 1956, the railroad applied with the New York State Public Service Commission for permission to raise commuter fares for the first time in four years.

On May 26, 1956, Mayor Robert F. Wagner Jr. announced that a far-off goal of city planners was to improve Park Avenue north of 96th Street by removing the New York Central's tracks from the street. He stated that the plan would require the New York Central to construct a new terminal station in Mott Haven and eliminate service to Grand Central Terminal, which he stated cost a lot to operate. The removal of the tracks would enable for the widening of Park Avenue and the elimination of slums and urban decay. Wagner said that all new housing projects built along the street were set back to provide further room.

=== Rehabilitation ===
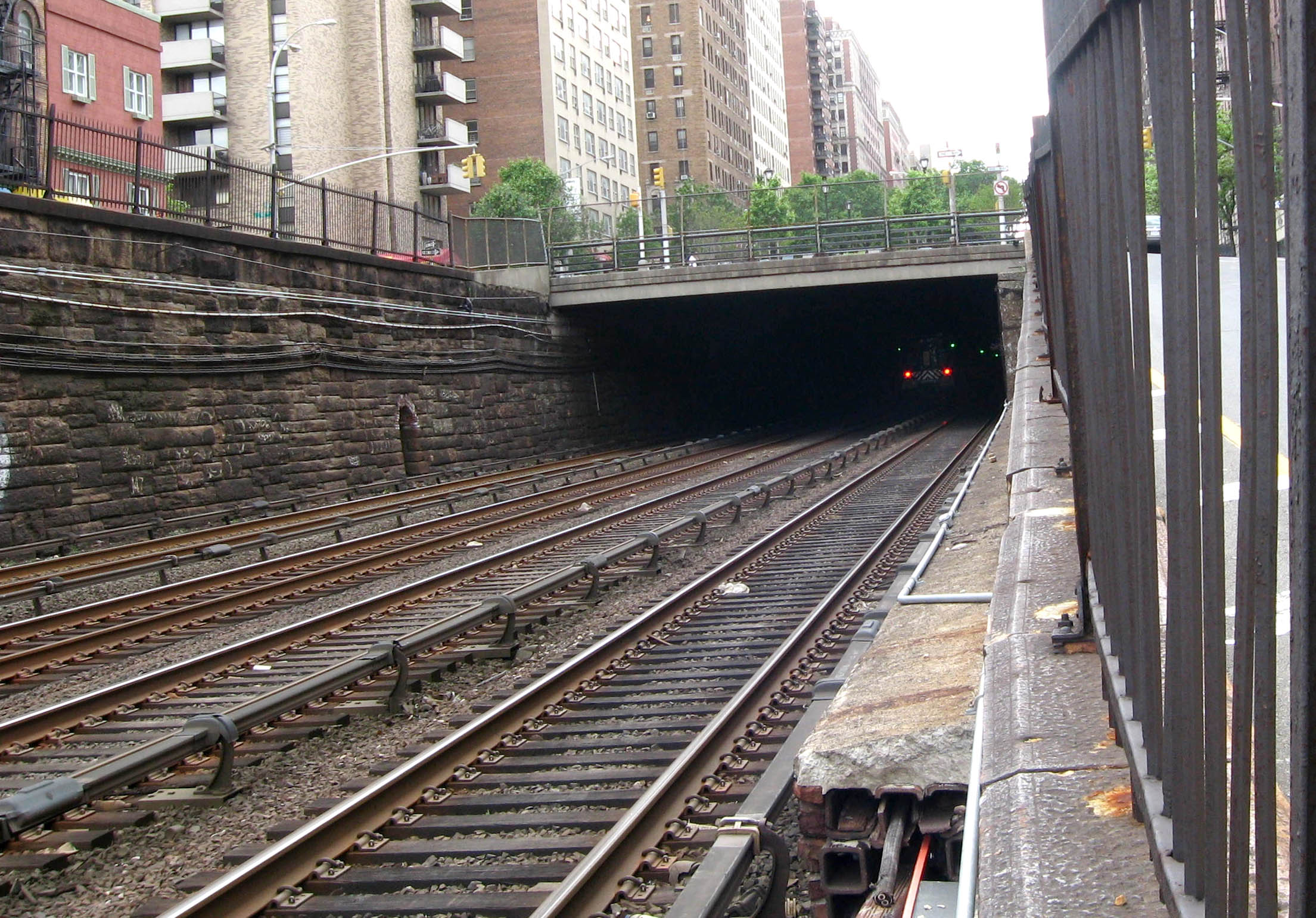
Looking south into the Park Avenue Tunnel

==== Late 20th century ====
In 1975, work began on a project to replace a 350 foot (110 m)-long steel viaduct, which carries the four-track line between the Harlem River Vertical Lift Bridge and Mott Haven Interlocking and over 138th Street at the Grand Concourse. The viaduct was built between 1893 and 1895. As part of the project, it was replaced with an earth-filled embankment and a new bridge across 138th Street. The feasibility study for the project was funded by a grant awarded by the Urban Mass Transit Administration. The project was funded with toll revenues from the Triborough Bridge and Tunnel Authority facilities. In March 1976, a $5,859,500 contract was awarded to make repairs to the Park Avenue Viaduct. The contract covered repairs to connection angles, troughs, girders and the replacement of columns on the section of the viaduct between 110th Street and 132nd Street.

Between 1988 and 1990, the Park Avenue Tunnel was rehabilitated from Grand Central Terminal to 96th Street. An amendment to the Metropolitan Transportation Authority (MTA)'s 1982–1986 Capital Program in 1983 provided $46 million in additional funding for the project. As part of the project, structural steel, aged wiring conduits and the roadbed were replaced; the side walls and waterproofing were repaired; and a new drainage system was installed. In December 1984, it was estimated that the project would take 2 1/2 to 3 years to complete and would cost $75 million. Work on the project was expected to be completed by taking one track out of service at a time. To complete the work, the roadway of Park Avenue would be opened-up. A large percentage of the cost of the project would go to the repair or replacement of the concrete supports and girders in the tunnel. In addition, overhead clearances would be increased, new tracks would be installed in the terminal and the tunnel, and concrete ties would be installed under all the tracks, replacing wooden ties on some tracks. Other work completed as part of the project included the modernization of the signal system and the construction of new entrances to the north of Grand Central Terminal.

The contract for the project was awarded in December 1986 and construction on it began in mid-1987, at which point the project's cost reached $105 million. The project was completed in June 1992, ten months after its anticipated completion date of August 1991, resulting from issues with the project design. The tunnel roof's design was changed from being pre-cast to being cast-in-place after wood pilings were discovered in the tunnel, avoiding the need to spend an additional $20–30 million. In addition, the concrete ties for the tunnel were defective and were replaced by wood ties, and other costs were underestimated. In the end, the project cost $144 million (equivalent to $330 million in 2025).

The Park Avenue Viaduct was repaired by Metro-North Railroad between 1995 and 1998 for $120 million. The project replaced the existing deck with a concrete one, and repaired columns, retaining walls and girders. A low-level barrier was installed on either side of the viaduct to reduce noise from train wheels. At the same time, extensive repairs to the Park Avenue Tunnel Train Shed began.

==== 21st century ====
In September 2007, Metro-North reached an agreement with the New York City Department of Transportation (NYCDOT) to install pedestrian traffic signals along Park Avenue between 46th Street and 56th Street. The two sides had feuded over the issue since 1982, when the line was controlled by Penn Central. In 1997, the NYCDOT commissioner stated that signals would be installed during an upcoming phase of reconstruction in the Grand Central area. The $35 million project, whose cost was split between Metro-North and the city, was approved by the MTA Board later that month. It called for the installation of 12 pedestrian signals and 8 traffic signals at the eleven intersections and the renovation of the sidewalks and streets around Grand Central to prevent rainwater from seeping into the tunnel. Car traffic in this area had been controlled by traffic lights on a pole at each intersection in the middle of the median, instead of the usual four from each direction, resulting in a relatively high rate of pedestrian injuries. Additional traffic lights and pedestrian signals had not been added because this area of Park Avenue was located directly atop the roof of the Park Avenue Tunnel, with the street being 8 inches (20 cm) above the roof in some locations. Because the roof was 18 to 24 inches (46 to 61 cm) thick, there was not enough room to provide a foundation for the traffic poles without puncturing the structure. Due to the high cost of making these upgrades, and the lack of cooperation between the New York City Department of Transportation and Metro-North, which had opposed any solution that would modify the tunnel roof, the project was delayed for several years. The project had been estimated to cost $200,000 per intersection in 1994. As part of the new agreement, Metro-North designed a way to anchor the traffic signals in the deck and tunnel roof.

In 2013, the MTA completed a comprehensive assessment of the condition of the Train Shed as part of the 2010–2014 Capital Program. Following the study, plans were developed to repair the structure block-by-block. In the MTA's 2015–2019 Capital Program $180 million was provided to replace the structure under Park Avenue between 48th Street and 49th Street in addition to other locations. However, the July 2017 amendment to the program reduced the project to $67 million, moving the first stage of construction to the next capital program. The program also included $1 million in funding to study improvements to improve fire safety in the Park Avenue Tunnel, including the installation of improved emergency lighting and wayfinding signage directing to emergency exits. The cost for this project later increased to $5 million.

On May 17, 2016, a fire started under the Park Avenue Viaduct at 118th Street when a plant nursery that had been leasing space under the viaduct from the city spilled fuel on a hot generator. Temporary repairs allowed for the resumption of service. In July, the MTA Board approved the allocation of $3.3 million to pay for the construction of temporary supports for the structure, which would eliminate speed restrictions imposed for diesel locomotives. That same month, the MTA moved to sue the city over the fire. The temporary repairs were completed in September, and permanent repairs were completed in November. The permanent repairs, which replaced a support column, cost $6 million. After the fire, Metro-North assessed the condition of the entire viaduct and identified critical sections that needed to be replaced. In May 2019, Metro-North announced, as part of its Way Ahead plan to improve service, that it would request funding to replace the Park Avenue Viaduct and repair the Park Avenue Tunnel as part of the MTA's upcoming 2020–2024 Capital Program.

In September 2019, the Capital Program was released by the MTA and approved by the MTA Board; it includes $159.6 million for improvements in the tunnel, $386.9 million in funding to replace the viaduct, and $348.8 million to repair the Grand Central Terminal train shed. The viaduct and train shed projects will be completed in multiple stages and will be completed in future capital programs. The first stage of the viaduct project consists of inspections, design work, and the replacement of the most critical portions of the viaduct. During the first part of the train shed project, the first section of train shed will be replaced and design work will be completed for the next part. The train shed repairs will address the deterioration of the train shed's roof and its support due to the intrusion of water and salt from Park Avenue. The Park Avenue Tunnel project will construct four new emergency exits in two locations. As part of the train shed project, about 650,000 square feet (60,000 m^{2}) of the roof would be replaced; this involved replacing the roadways and sidewalks above the train shed. By 2024, the cost of the train shed replacement had increased to $1.7 billion.

===== Viaduct replacement =====
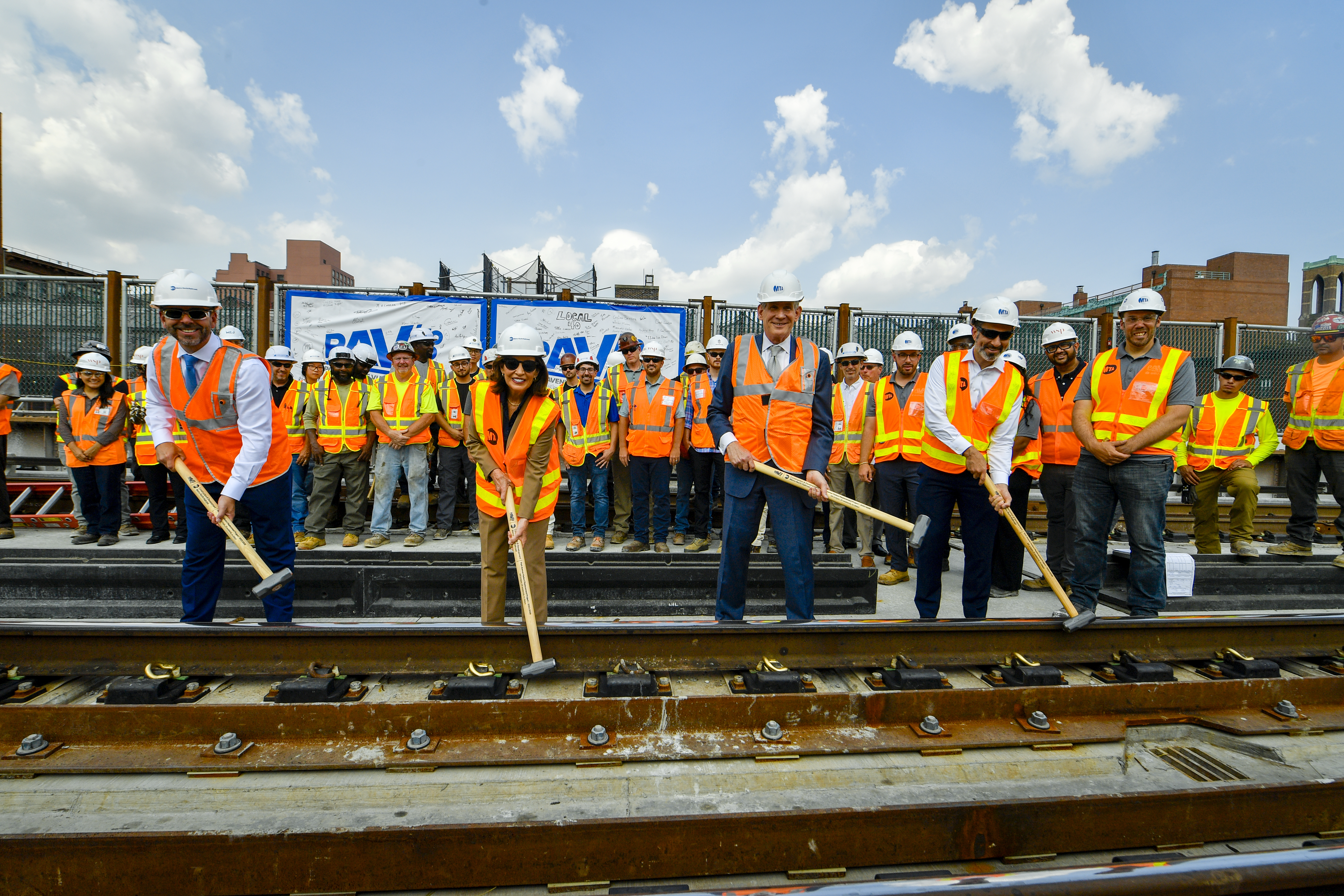
Justin Vonashek, Governor Kathy Hochul, Janno Lieber, and Jamie Torres-Springer drive in ceremonial golden clips to mark the completion of the Park Avenue Viaduct project north of the Harlem-125th St Metro-North station on Monday, Jul 27, 2026.

The MTA began replacing the Park Avenue Viaduct in East Harlem in October 2023. The project began with new foundations and columns being installed under the existing viaduct structure. In 2024, work began to incrementally demolish and reconstruct the viaduct, beginning with the two eastern tracks. During weekend outages of the affected tracks, several consecutive spans were removed using overhead gantries, then the existing support columns removed. Prefabricated spans of the new viaduct were then lifted into place onto the support columns previously installed. The tracks, electrical, and signaling systems were then connected to the adjacent segments prior to the peak train schedule resuming the following Monday morning. The new viaduct is a light grey color to reduce its visual impact on the neighborhood.

The viaduct replacement was completed in July 2026, five years ahead of schedule, and cost about $600 million.

== Stations ==
There are two stations currently in operation and four that have been closed.

Both of the stations currently in operation are served by the three Metro-North Railroad lines that terminate in Grand Central: the Harlem Line, Hudson Line, and New Haven Line.

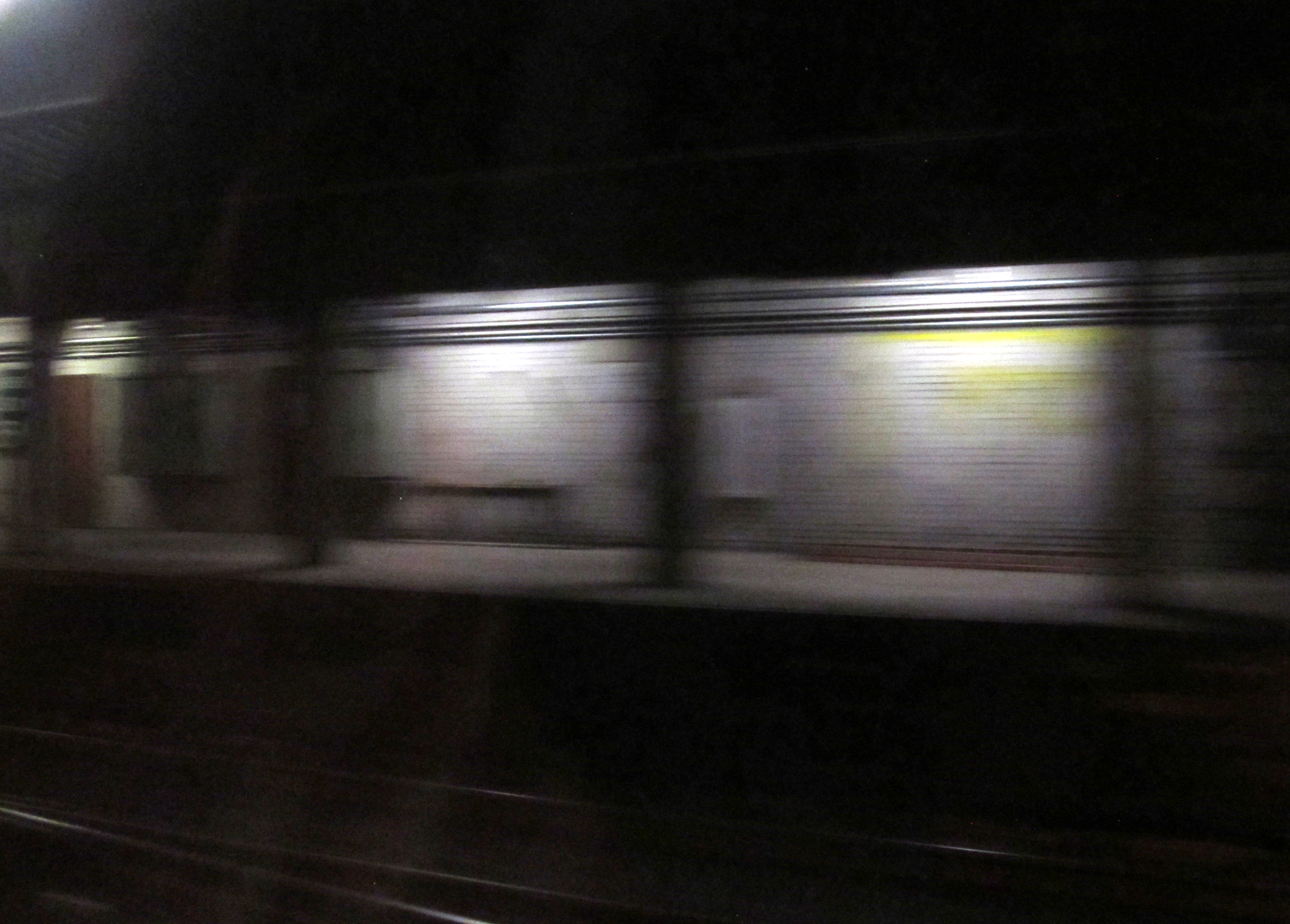
The former 59th Street station in 2017

Along the viaduct, there is one former station at 110th Street, and along the tunnel are three former stations, located at 59th Street, 72nd Street, and 86th Street, each of which had side platforms on the two outer tracks. These are now used for storage and emergency exits. None of the stations' platforms are more than 172 feet (52 m) long, making them too short for contemporary trains to use. While the 59th Street and 72nd Street stations had typical side platforms located on the outside of all four tracks (i.e. trains on the outer tracks opened their doors on the right), the 86th Street station had two platforms located in between the outside tracks and the center pair of tracks, creating side platforms that resembled walled-off island platforms. This is similar to the layout at 14th Street–Sixth Avenue, where the platforms are walled off from the center tracks, so that trains on the outer tracks opened their doors on the left, and trains on the inner tracks bypassed the station.

Zone	Milepost (km)	Station	Location	Date opened	Date closed	Connections
1	0.0 mi (0 km)	Grand Central Terminal	Manhattan	October 6, 1871		New York City Subway: 4, 5, 6, <6>, 7, <7>, and S (at Grand Central–42nd Street); New York City Bus: M42, M101, M102, M103, SIM4C, SIM6, SIM11, SIM22, SIM26; MTA Bus: BxM1
1		59th Street	Manhattan		(closed)	
1		72nd Street	Manhattan		June 23, 1901	
1	2.2 mi (3.5 km)	86th Street	Manhattan	May 15, 1876	June 23, 1901	
1	3.4 mi (5.5 km)	110th Street	Manhattan	May 15, 1876	June 17, 1906	
1	4.2 mi (6.8 km)	Harlem–125th Street	Manhattan	October 25, 1897		New York City Subway: 4, 5, 6, and <6> (at 125th Street); New York City Bus: Bx15, M35, M60 SBS, M98, M100, M101
2	5.0 mi (8.0 km)	138th Street	The Bronx	c. 1858	July 2, 1972	
