= Harlem River Lift Bridge =

Bridge between Manhattan and the Bronx, New York

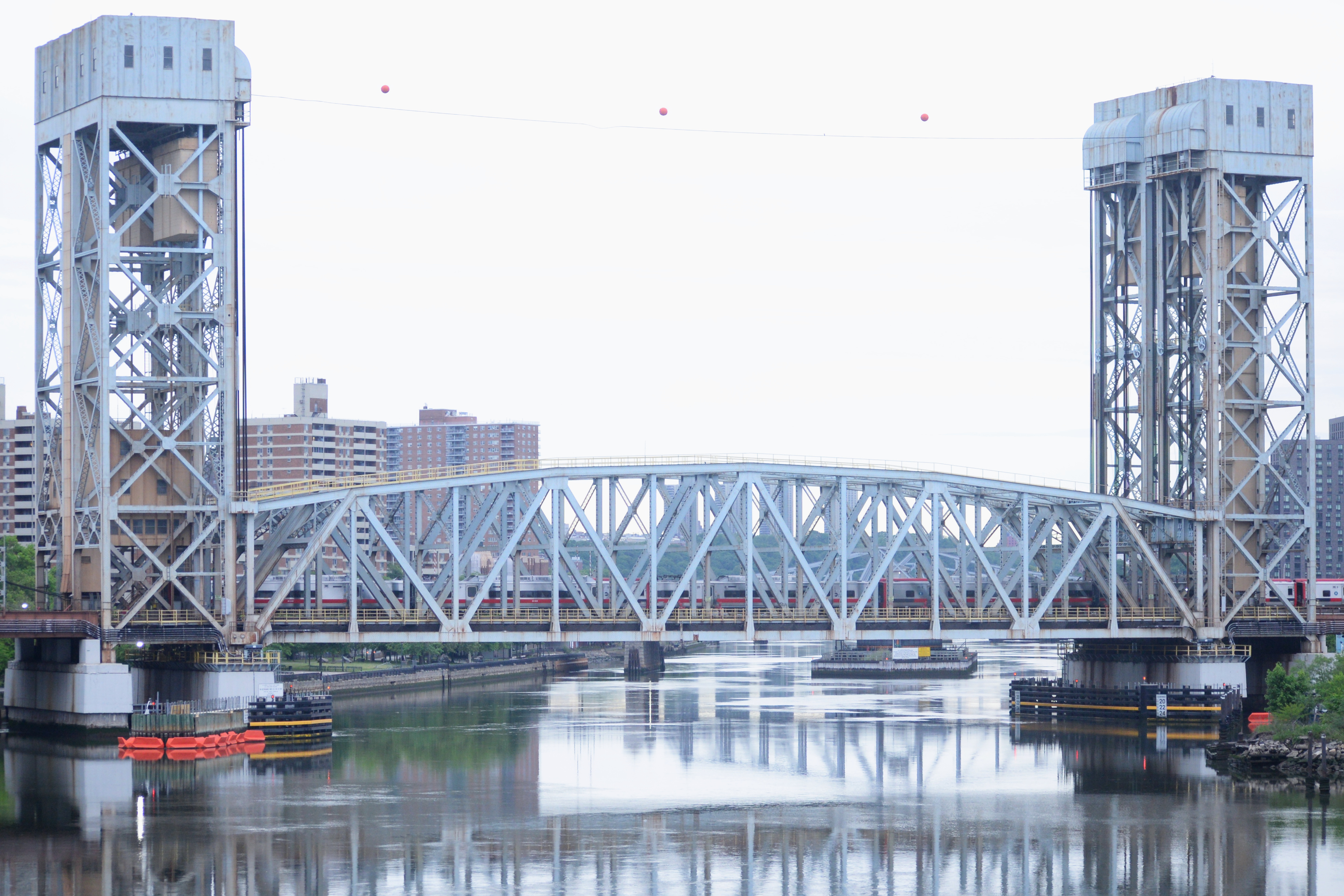
- A Metro-North train crossing the bridge
- Coordinates: 40°48′40″N 73°56′00″W
- Carries: 4 tracks of the Metro-North Railroad
- Crosses: Harlem River
- Locale: Manhattan and the Bronx in New York City
- Maintained by: Metropolitan Transportation Authority

Characteristics
- Design: Vertical lift bridge
- Longest span: 340 ft (100 m)
- Clearance below: Closed: 25 ft (7.6 m); Open: 135 ft (41 m)

History
- Opened: 1956 (replacing 1897 bridge)

Location
- Interactive map of Harlem River Lift Bridge

The Harlem River Lift Bridge (also known as the Park Avenue Bridge) is a vertical lift railroad bridge between the boroughs of Manhattan and the Bronx in New York City. It carries the Hudson, Harlem, and New Haven lines of the Metro-North Railroad's Park Avenue main line across the Harlem River. The average weekday ridership on the lines is 265,000.

== Design and operation ==
The four-track bridge consists of two parallel double-track spans 340 feet (100 m) long and 13 feet (4.0 m) apart. The lift spans of both sections are controlled by separate towers, so that an accident or malfunction on one leaves two functioning tracks available on the other side. It has 25 feet (7.6 m) of clearance when closed and 135 feet (41 m) when open.

Under Coast Guard regulations, the bridge is not required to open for vessel traffic during rush hour commutes—from 5 a.m. to 10 a.m. and 4 p.m. to 8 p.m. Mondays to Fridays, excluding holidays—or when a train is within five minutes of crossing the bridge. All other times, at least four-hour notice must be provided for the drawbridge to open when signaled.

== History ==
=== First bridge ===
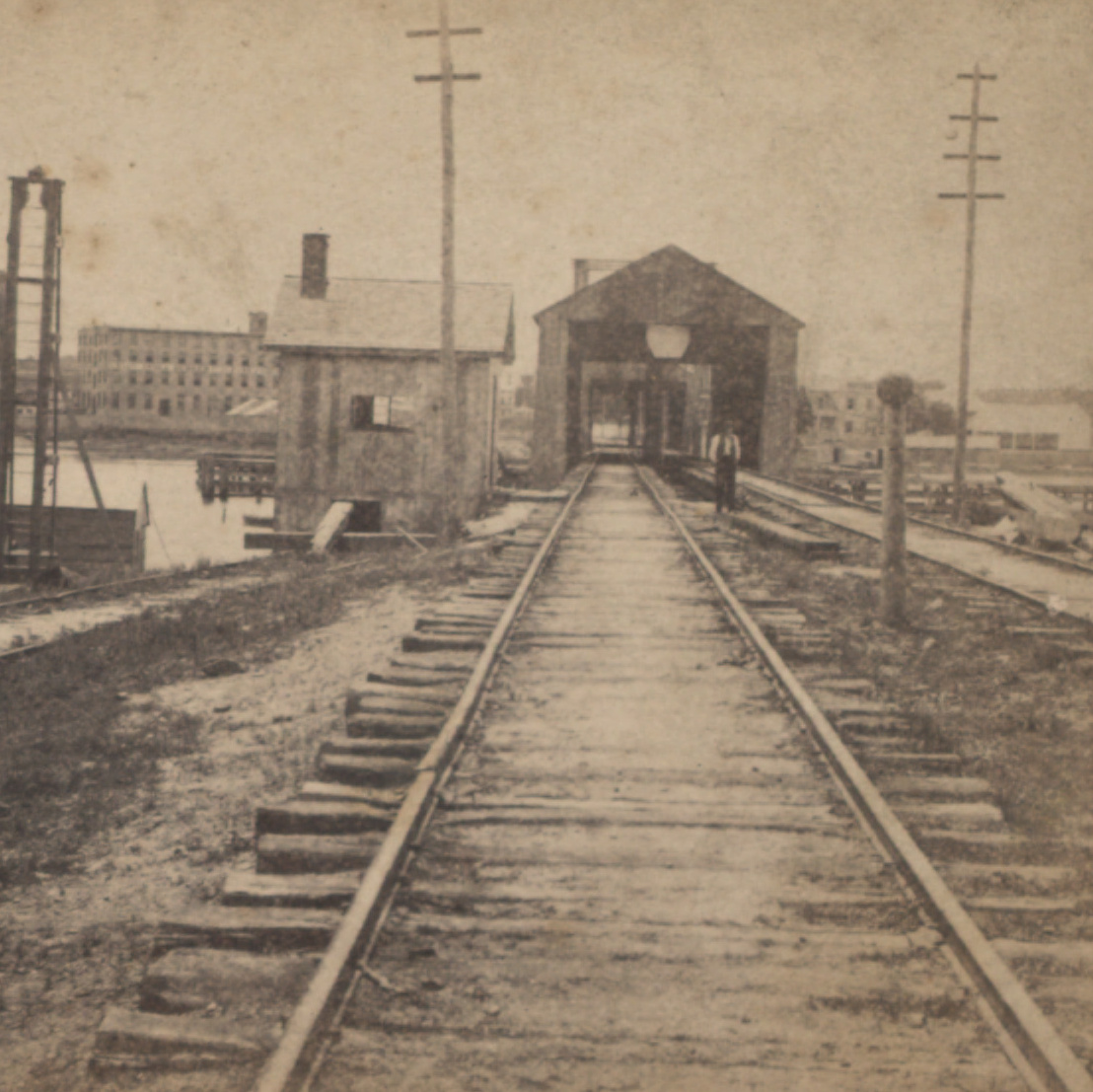
The original version of the bridge built by the New York and Harlem Railroad.

The first bridge on this site was constructed by the New York and Harlem Railroad in 1841. It was composed of four 90-foot (27 m)-long box truss spans, three of which were fixed iron spans, while the remaining span was a wooden swing span. In the closed position, the bridge had a clearance of only seven feet above the mean high water level. Masonry piers supported the four box-truss spans. In 1867, the wooden drawbridge was replaced with an iron one that gave a clearance of 50 feet. By the 1880s, the bridge was crossed by more than 200 trains a day.

=== Second and third bridges ===
The 1867 bridge was soon made obsolete by heavy traffic and dredging of the Harlem River Ship Canal. In 1888, the United States Department of War began work on the Harlem River to allow for unrestricted shipping activity between the Hudson River and the East River and through the new Harlem River Ship Canal at 225th Street.

The New York Central was opposed to the project as the increase in river traffic would interfere with its rail line, which was only 8 feet (2.4 m) above the water. In 1890, the New York and Northern Railway, a competitor of the New York Central which operated freight traffic to the Bronx shore which relied upon barges to ship its freight, complained to the Department of War about delays to its traffic due to the New York Central's low bridge.

To remedy the situation, the Central could have raised the bridge to 24 feet (7.3 m) above the water to satisfy the Department of War, allowing most vessels to cross under the bridge, for $300,000 or replaced it with a tunnel to satisfy the Harlem community for $3 million. The railroad opted to raise the bridge, which was the only four-track drawbridge in the country at the time. Alfred P. Boller worked with the railroad to create the new four-tracked swing bridge. Due to political pressure, it had to raise the grade of its line north of 115th Street on a viaduct, raising the project's cost significantly.

In 1892, a law was passed establishing the Board of Park Avenue Improvement. Under the terms of the law, New York City was to pay for half of the project, with the remainder paid for by the New York Central.

The new bridge was to be 400 feet (120 m)-long and was built for about $500,000 by the King Bridge Company. The new bridge was to be 17 feet (5.2 m) higher than the old bridge, as mandated by the Federal Government, making it 24 feet (7.3 m) above the water. The Park Avenue Line's grade had to be raised to allow it to reach the higher bridge, and as a result, a new four-track steel viaduct was built between 132nd Street and 106th Street.

During construction, trains were to run over a temporary wooden structure along with a temporary two-track wooden drawbridge. The cost of the entire project was to be $2 million. At the time, construction was expected to begin on September 1, 1893. The work was divided into four sections. The bridge's design was underway in 1894, and in February 1894, the project was expected to be completed in December 1895. Service continued to operate during a complex procedure involving the installation of temporary wooden trestles, trusses, and the installation of columns.

On February 15, 1897, trains on the Harlem Division started running over the new drawbridge over the Harlem River and the elevated structure connecting to it. The Department of War ordered that the bridge could not be opened during peak hours, between 7 and 10 a.m. and 4 and 7 p.m.

=== Current bridge ===
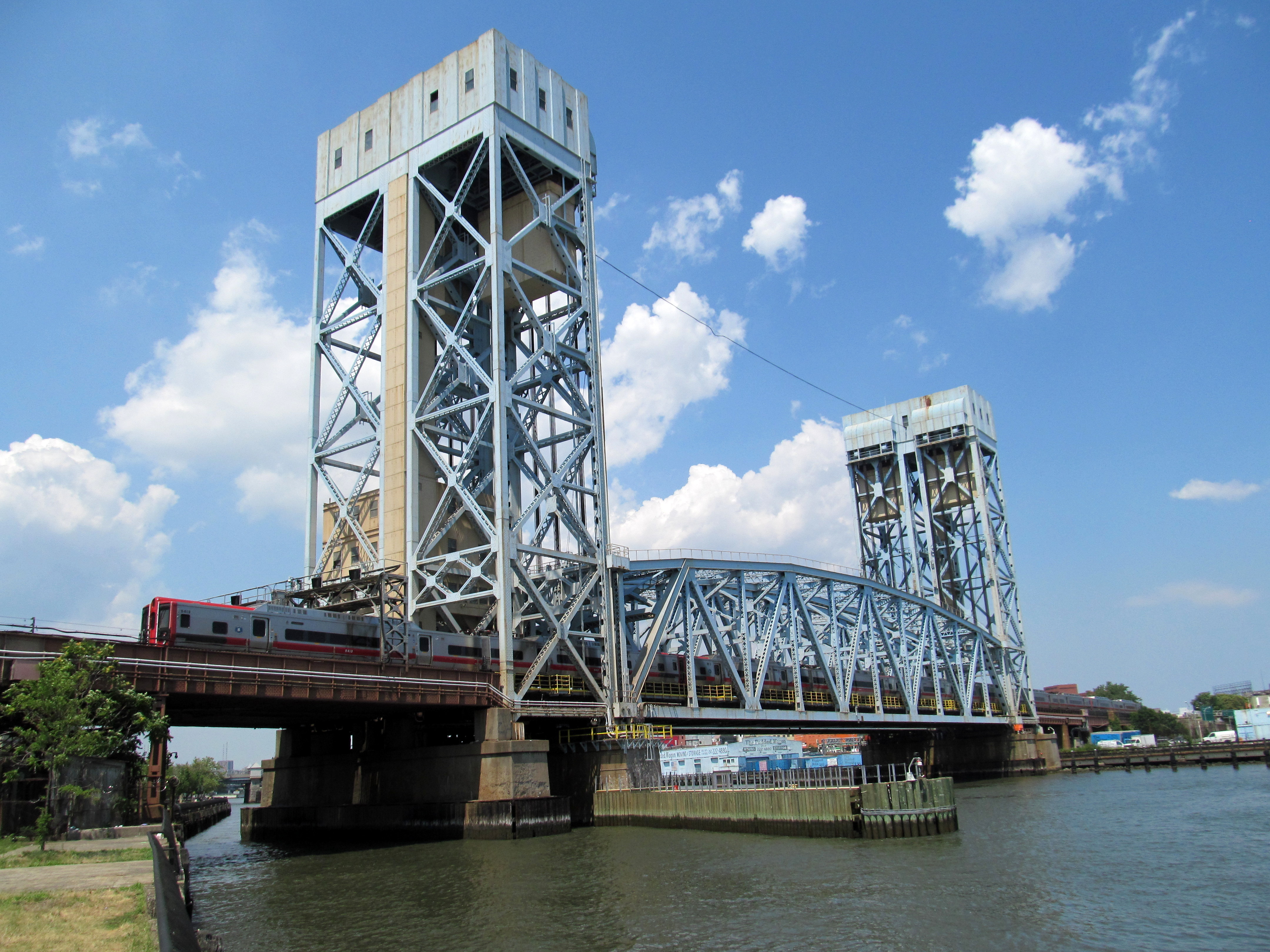
M8 railcars on the modern bridge in 2014

Between 1954 and 1956, the New York Central Railroad (NYCR) built a fourth rail bridge on this site, this time a vertical-lift bridge, to replace the 1897 bridge. This new bridge cost $18.5 million and was designed to be able to open and close in four minutes to let river traffic through—a significant improvement for commuters from the previous bridge that delayed trains nine minutes when opened for boats. Chairman of the NYCR Robert Young was critical of the bridge's construction, though; its cost and its 135-foot clearance "would permit a battleship to sail up to the Yankee Stadium", he said, and that it was unfair for NYCR to subsidize the US Navy.

The new bridge opened in 1956 and remains in use today. In the 1960s, the bridge came under the ownership of several different companies, including Penn Central Railroad. Currently it is operated as part of the Metro-North's Park Avenue main line, whose Hudson, Harlem, and New Haven lines all use the bridge.

Between 2014 and 2015, the bridge underwent a full renovation. The motors which lifted the bridge, the circuit breaker room (which flooded during Hurricane Sandy), and the cables connected to the counterweights were entirely replaced. During work, the bridge was locked in the "down" position, reducing clearance over the Harlem River to 25 feet.
