= Spanish Harlem (disambiguation) =

Spanish Harlem may refer to:

- Spanish Harlem, a neighborhood in New York City
- "Spanish Harlem" (song), a song most famously recorded by Ben E. King
- Spanish Harlem (album), a 1961 album by Ben E. King

== See also ==
- Spanish Harlem Orchestra
- Harlem (disambiguation)
