= Haarlem (disambiguation) =

Haarlem is the capital city of North Holland, a province in the Netherlands.

Other places with the name Haarlem include:

- Haarlem, Western Cape, a town in South Africa
- Haarlem, a place in Suriname
- "Haarlem", a song by Billy Woods from Aethiopes (2022)
- Haarlemmermeer, a polder in North Holland

== See also ==
- Harlem (disambiguation)
