= Harlem Shuffle (disambiguation) =

"Harlem Shuffle" is an R&B song written and originally recorded by the duo Bob & Earl in 1963.

Harlem Shuffle may also refer to:

- Harlem Shuffle (dance step)
- Harlem Shuffle EP, 2008 EP by 40 Cal.
- Harlem Shuffle (novel), 2021 novel by Colson Whitehead

== See also ==
- Harlem shake (disambiguation)
