= West Harlem =

West Harlem may refer to:

- Western Harlem in Manhattan, New York
- An area of Harlem in Manhattan, New York
  - Hamilton Heights, Manhattan, a neighborhood in that area
    - West Harlem Historic District, a historic district in Hamilton Heights
  - Manhattanville, Manhattan, a neighborhood in that area; also sometimes known as "West Harlem"
  - Morningside Heights, Manhattan, a neighborhood in that area
- West Harlem Art Fund, a public art and preservation organization
- West Harlem Environmental Action, an environmental organization
