= Harlem Shake =

Harlem shake may refer to:

- Harlem shake (dance), a dance originating in Harlem, US, in 1981
- "Harlem Shake" (song), a 2012 song by American record producer Baauer
- Harlem Shake (meme), an Internet meme from the song, which began in early 2013
- Harlem Shakes, an American indie rock band

== See also ==
- Harlem Shuffle (disambiguation)
