= Harlem Shuffle (dance step) =

The Harlem Shuffle is a dance maneuver that takes various forms. One form is as a complete line dance, consisting of approximately 25 steps. Other forms may include a simplified two-step followed by a shoulder-brushing motion with the back of the opposite hand.

In some respects, the maneuver is a homage to the vibrant dance culture that permeated dance clubs of the Harlem area during the Harlem Renaissance. Such gestures became increasingly common from the 1980s onwards, as greater attempts were made to properly credit the influence of African-American artists and musicians on popular culture.
