= 110th Street station (New York Central Railroad) =

Closed train station in Manhattan, New York

110th Street
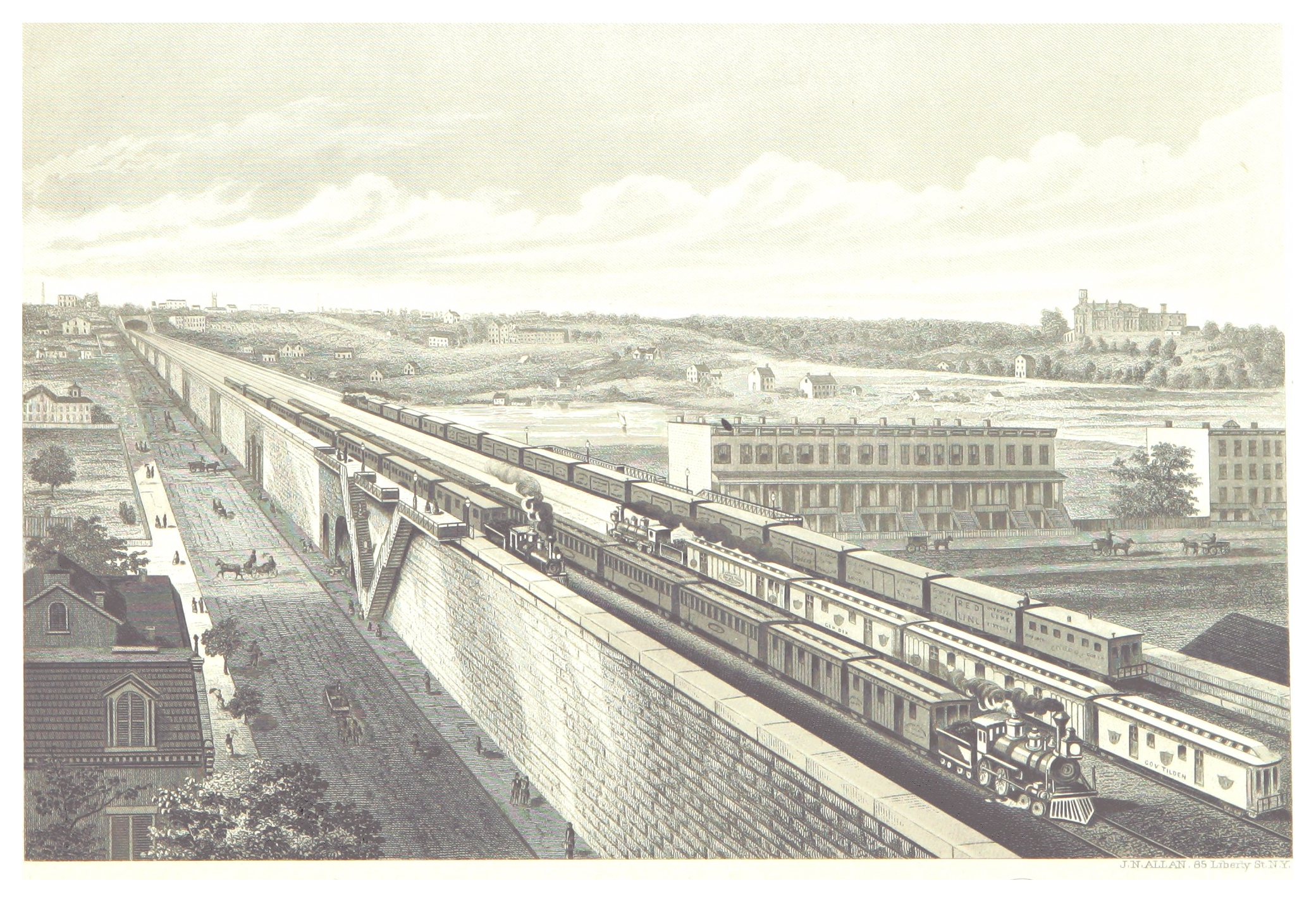
- 110th Street station in 1876

General information
- Location: Park Avenue and 110th Street; East Harlem, Manhattan, New York
- Coordinates: 40.795502°N 73.946057°W
- Line: Park Avenue Viaduct (Hudson Line)
- Platforms: 2 side platforms
- Tracks: 4

History
- Opened: May 15, 1876; 150 years ago
- Closed: June 17, 1906; 120 years ago

Former services
Preceding station	New York Central & Hudson River Railroad	Following station
125th Street toward Peekskill	Hudson Division	New York Terminus
125th Street toward Chatham	Harlem Division	86th Street toward New York
Location

The 110th Street station was a station located on the Metro-North Railroad's Park Avenue Viaduct in East Harlem, Manhattan, New York City. The station was built by the New York Central & Hudson River Railroad as part of an agreement with the New York City government. It was located at Park Avenue and 110th Street.

== History ==
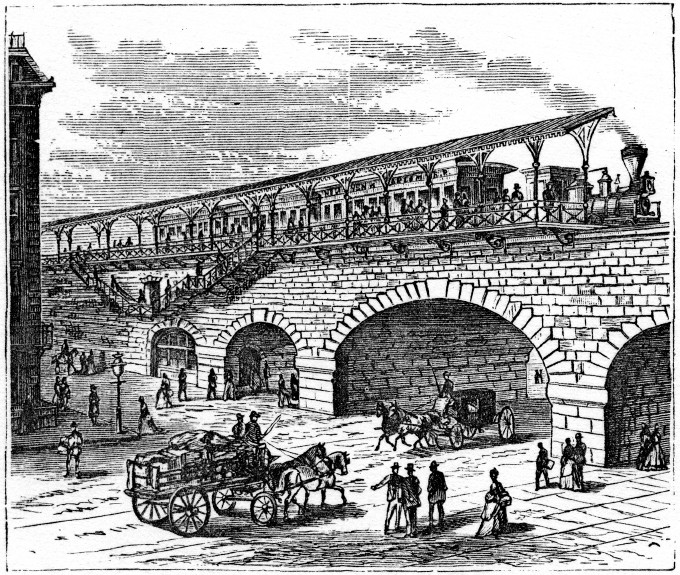
1875 sketch of the station, looking east. Minor errors are present in this early depiction, including the street level window and entrance.

This station opened on May 15, 1876, with the introduction of partial rapid transit on the Harlem Line, with sixteen trains a day running between Grand Central Depot and William's Bridge. On the same date, the 86th Street station opened, and while that station was exclusively served by the rapid transit service, some trains expresses to Golden's Bridge stopped here. By 1904, this station was only served by local trains.

This station was rebuilt in 1896–1897 as the line's grade was raised onto iron girders. The viaduct and new station opened in February 1897.

On April 24, 1906, the New York Central applied to the New York State Board of Railroad Commissioners for permission to discontinue service at the 110th Street station. The Board granted the Central permission on May 9 to close the station on June 1. However, it closed on June 17. This station and the 86th Street station were the only two stations between 125th Street and Grand Central to receive regular passenger service.

== Station layout ==
The 110th Street station was partially built within the viaduct. The station's waiting room was built into the northern side of the bridge over the 110th Street and was located at street level. From the waiting room, two staircases went up along the side of the viaduct's retaining walls–one per side–to the side platforms atop the viaduct. The stairways to the street still exist, and are used in case of emergencies. The station platforms were 130.5 feet (39.8 m) long and 5.25 feet (1.60 m) wide and extended north from 110th Street. The station was located on the viaduct about .75 miles (1.21 km) north of the Park Avenue Tunnel.
