= Harlem–125th Street station =

Metro-North Railroad station in Manhattan, New York

Harlem–125th Street
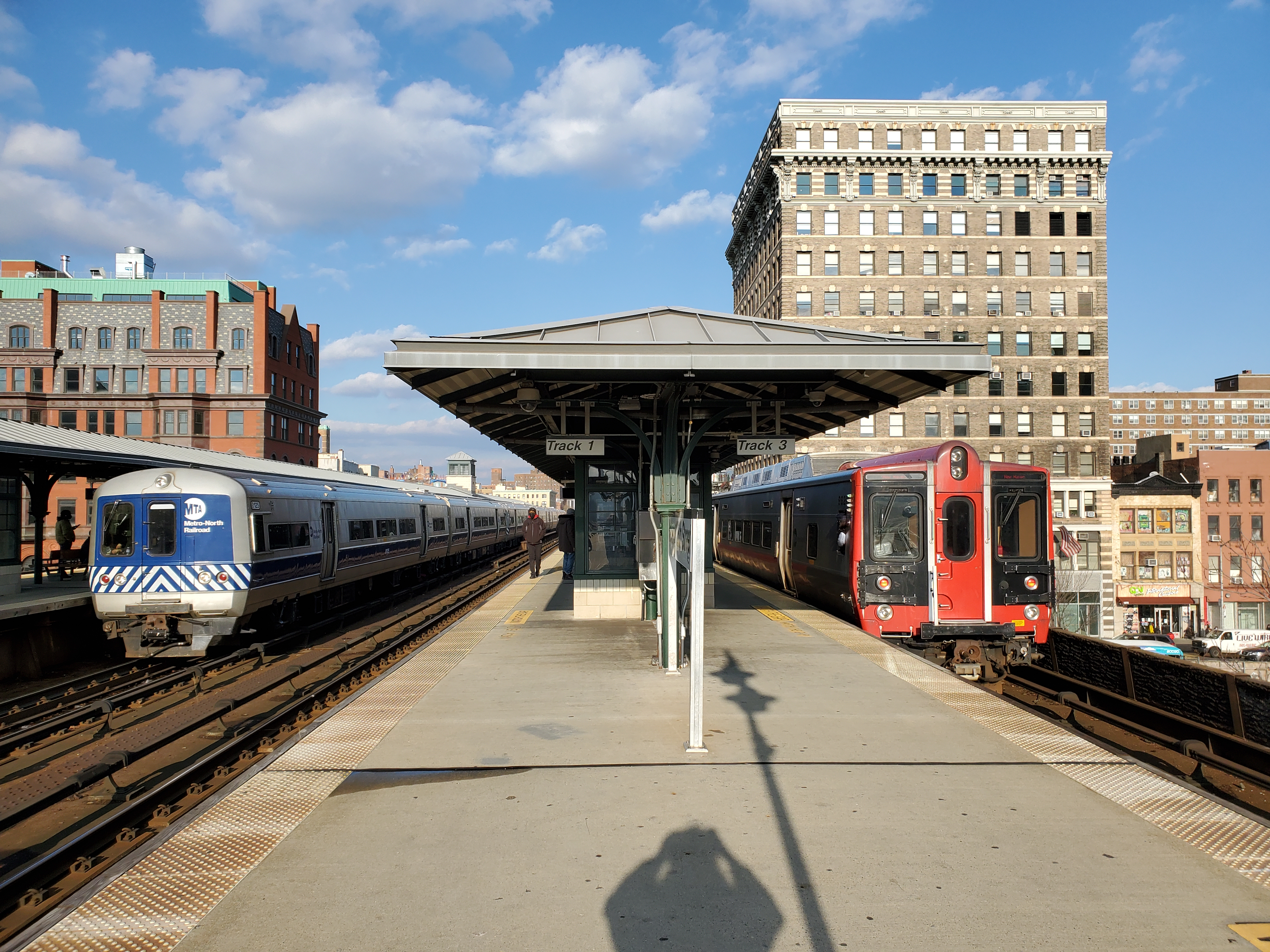
- Two trains at Harlem–125th Street station in December 2021

General information
- Location: 101 East 125th Street, East Harlem, Manhattan, New York
- Coordinates: 40.8052°N 73.9390°W
- Owner: Metropolitan Transportation Authority
- Line: Park Avenue main line
- Platforms: 2 island platforms
- Tracks: 4
- Connections: New York City Subway: trains at 125th Street; New York City Bus: M1, M35, M60 SBS, M98, M101, M103, M125; MTA Bus: BxM3, BxM4; Columbia Transportation: Intercampus Red Line, Intercampus Blue Line, Intercampus Green Line

Construction
- Accessible: yes

Other information
- Fare zone: 1

History
- Opened: 1874; 152 years ago
- Electrified: 700V (DC) third rail

Passengers
- 2018: 8,052 (Metro-North)
- Rank: 3 of 109

Services
Preceding station	Metro-North Railroad	Following station
Grand Central Terminus	Harlem Line	Melrose toward North White Plains
Grand Central Terminus	Harlem Line	White Plains toward North White Plains, Southeast or Wassaic
Grand Central Terminus	Hudson Line	Yankees–East 153rd Street toward Croton–Harmon
Grand Central Terminus	Hudson Line	Croton–Harmon toward Poughkeepsie
Grand Central Terminus	Hudson Line	Tarrytown toward Poughkeepsie
Grand Central Terminus	New Haven Line	Fordham toward Stamford
Grand Central Terminus	New Haven Line weekday service	Stamford toward New Haven or New Haven State Street
Grand Central Terminus	New Canaan Branch weekday service	Greenwich toward New Canaan
Grand Central Terminus	Danbury Branch	Stamford toward Danbury
Special events service
Preceding station	Metro-North Railroad	Following station
Grand Central Terminus	GCT/Harlem 125th St	Yankees–East 153rd Street Terminus
Former services
Preceding station	New York Central Railroad	Following station
138th Street toward Chicago	Main Line	New York Terminus
138th Street toward Peekskill	Hudson Division	New York Terminus
138th Street toward Chatham	Harlem Division	New York Terminus
Preceding station	New York Central & Hudson River Railroad	Following station
138th Street toward Peekskill	Hudson Division	110th Street Closed 1906 toward New York
138th Street toward Chatham	Harlem Division	110th Street Closed 1906 toward New York
Preceding station	New York, New Haven and Hartford Railroad	Following station
New York Terminus	Main Line	Mount Vernon toward New Haven
- For further details on the track layout, see Park Avenue main line#Line description.
Location

Harlem–125th Street station is a commuter rail stop serving the Metro-North Railroad's Hudson, Harlem, and New Haven Lines. It is located at East 125th Street and Park Avenue in East Harlem, Manhattan, New York City. The station also serves as an important transfer point between the Metro-North trains and the New York City Subway's IRT Lexington Avenue Line (4, 5, 6, and <6> trains) for access to the Upper East Side of Manhattan. It is the only station besides Grand Central Terminal that serves all three lines east of the Hudson River. Trains leave for Grand Central Terminal, as well as to the Bronx and the northern suburbs, regularly.

The station was constructed along the Park Avenue main line of the New York Central Railroad.

== History ==
The current station was built in 1896–97 and designed by Morgan O'Brien, New York Central and Hudson River Railroad principal architect. It replaced an earlier one that was built in 1874 when the New York Central and the New York, New Haven & Hartford Railroad, the ancestors of today's Metro-North, moved the tracks from an open cut to the present-day elevated viaduct. The original station on the site was built in 1844, when the trains ran at grade-level on what is now Park Avenue. That station was demolished to make way for the open cut.

In 1888, the United States Department of War began work on the Harlem River to allow for unrestricted shipping activity between the Hudson River and the East River and through the new Harlem River Ship Canal at 225th Street. To remedy the situation, the Central opted to raise the bridge to 24 feet (7.3 m) above the water for $300,000. Due to political pressure, it had to raise the grade of its line north of 115th Street on a viaduct, raising the project's cost significantly. The Park Avenue Line's grade had to be raised to reach the higher bridge, and as a result, a new four-track steel viaduct was built between 132nd Street and 106th Street. Between 110th Street and 106th Street, the steel viaduct was to be placed atop the preexisting masonry retaining walls and fill. Between 115th Street and 130th Street, the viaduct was set to replace the open cut structure completed in 1875. Since the line was to be raised on a viaduct, the stone viaducts and the bridges crossing it could be removed. The 110th Street, 125th Street and Mott Haven stations were to be elevated as part of the project. The railroad had threatened to eliminate the 125th Street stop after neighboring property owners threatened to sue and successfully delayed construction.

On October 15, 1897, a spacious new station in Harlem was opened at 125th Street, replacing a small station in the old Park Avenue open cut located between 125th Street and 126th Street. The new station was built atop the old open cut and directly under the new Park Avenue Viaduct. The station was 30 feet (9.1 m) higher than the old one. The platforms, which were built on the viaduct, were built to be 400 feet (120 m) long. Unlike the old station, which was a local stop, the new station was constructed with two island platforms to allow express trains to stop, with the local tracks curving outwards to make room for them. The station was designed by architect Morgan O'Brien, and consisted of three levels: the basement containing a section of the old cut not filled in, a waiting room at street level, and the elevated platforms. The original station platforms were discovered in the basement level in 1988 as the station was set to be renovated.

As with many NYCRR stations in New York City, the station became a Penn Central station once the NYC & Pennsylvania Railroads merged in 1968. The New Haven Line and its branches would be acquired by Penn Central a year later, thus making it a full Penn Central station. Penn Central's continuous financial despair throughout the 1970s forced them to turn over their commuter service to the Metropolitan Transportation Authority (MTA). After the 138th Street in the Mott Haven section of the South Bronx was closed by Penn Central in 1972, 125th Street Station was the northernmost station to be shared by the Hudson and Harlem Lines. The station and the railroad were turned over to Conrail in 1976, and eventually became part of the MTA's Metro-North Railroad in 1983.

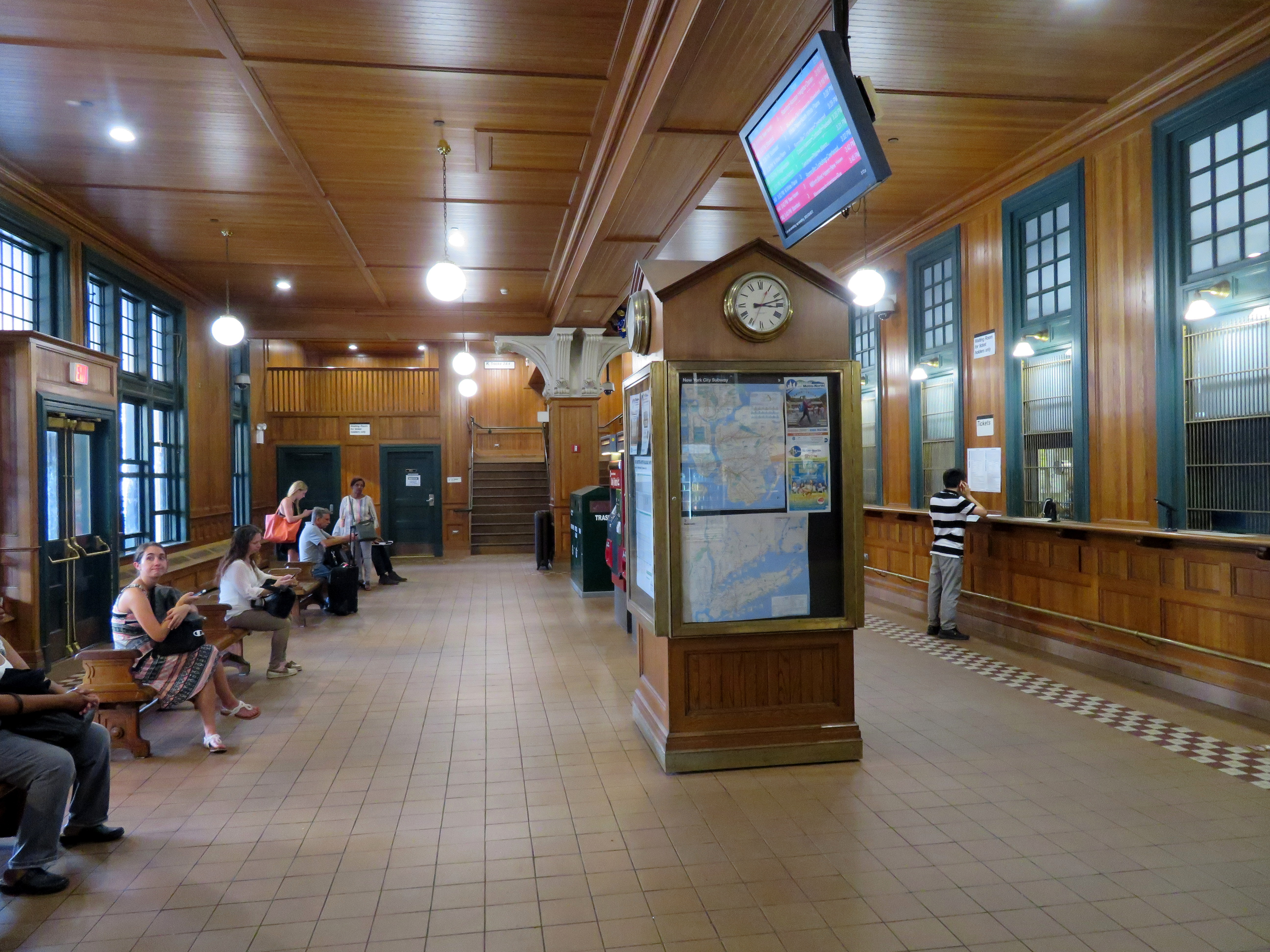
Interior of the station in 2018

On April 14, 1986, Metro-North awarded a $500,000 contract to URS Inc. to design a renovation of the station. At the time, it was expected that the renovation would repair the station's leaky roof, install new windows, lighting, and doors, and replace its dilapidated platforms. URS was expected to issue a preliminary report on the condition of the wooden station structure and the steel viaduct, and on short- and long-term plans to rehabilitate the station. At the time, weekday ridership at the station was 420 on the Hudson Line, 500 on the Harlem Line, and 670 on the New Haven Line.

A six-year-long renovation of the 1897 structure was completed in 1999 and cleared out a century's worth of neglect and deterioration. The entire Park Avenue viaduct was replaced piece-by-piece without disturbing Metro-North service for the duration of the renovation. This reconstruction included the removal of the Nick Tower just south of the station. The Nick Tower was a control tower mounted over the tracks spanning the entire right-of-way. The renovation is considered a replication, rather than renovation, of the original 1930s version of the station being that none of the original structure is visible to the public.

Under the 2015–2019 MTA Capital Plan, the station, along with four other Metro-North Railroad stations, would receive enhancements as part of the Enhanced Station Initiative. Updates would include cellular service, Wi-Fi, USB charging stations, interactive service advisories, and maps.

== Service ==
The station is used for travel to and from suburbs north of New York City and the Bronx rather than travel to and from Grand Central Terminal. All off peak and reverse peak trains to or from Grand Central Terminal stop at Harlem. It is in the same fare zone as Grand Central Terminal, so customers pay the same fare whether traveling to Harlem or Grand Central, and may use either station. Except for local Harlem and Hudson Line trains, northbound trains stop at the station only to receive passengers. Westbound New Haven Line trains and most inbound AM peak Harlem and Hudson Line trains stop only to discharge passengers. Other southbound Harlem and Hudson Line trains may leave five minutes early.

== Station layout ==
There are two 10-car long high-level island platforms, each serving two tracks. All of the tracks passing through the Harlem–125th Street station are reversible and can serve trains going in either direction. During rush hours, three tracks are typically assigned to the peak direction, with the remaining track serving the reverse direction.

== Future development ==
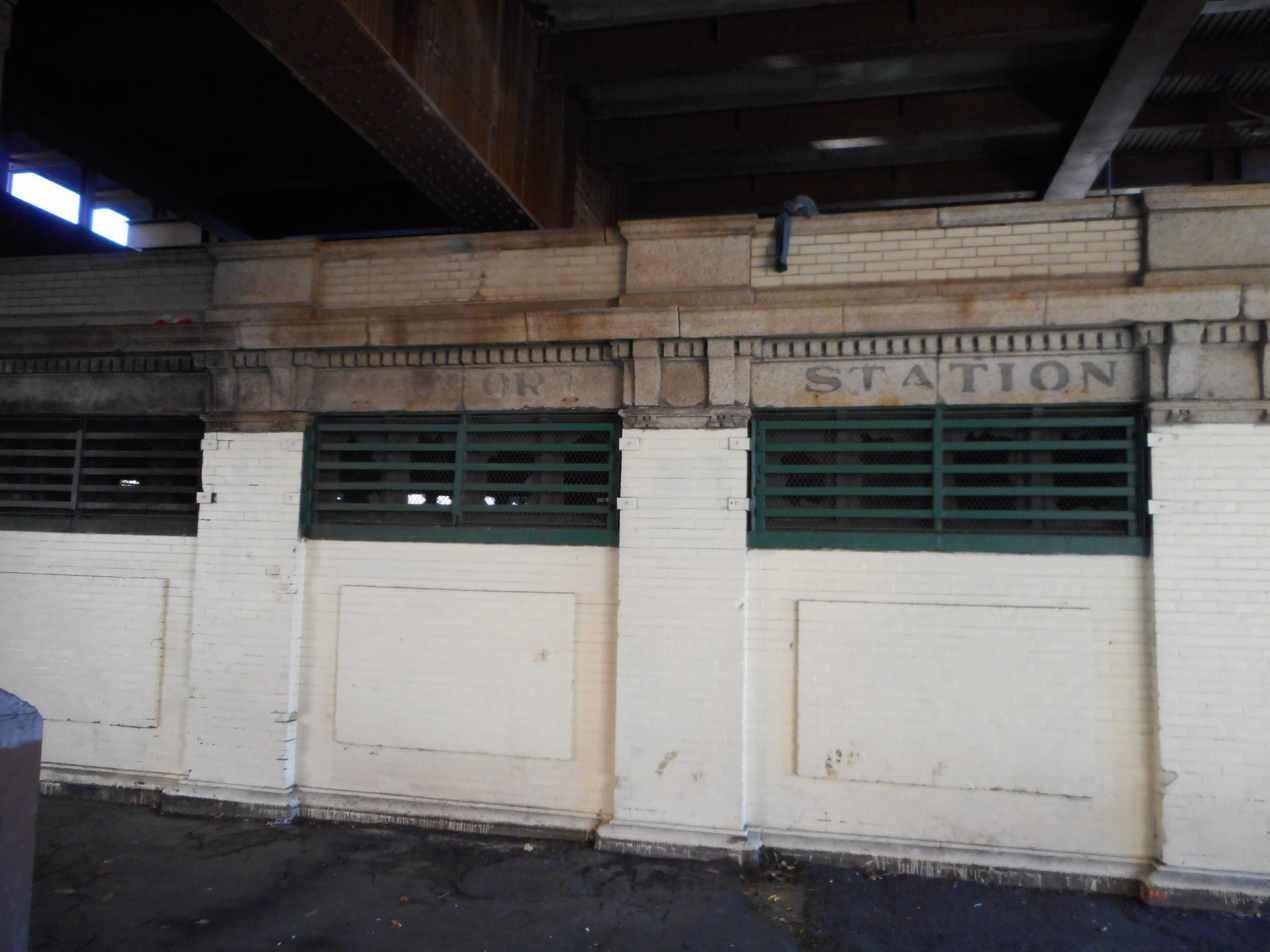
The station's former New York Central Railroad comfort station across 125th Street, which has been abandoned for many years.

The south side of 125th Street below the station viaduct houses a long-abandoned former comfort station (restroom facility) and the block has long been a vacant lot attracting garbage. The New York City Economic Development Corporation announced in 2013 that they would work with a mix of public agencies and private developers to improve the area surrounding the station, long considered a blight on East 125th Street.

In 2015, a nonprofit organization consisting of local small businesses, property owners and stakeholders called NHEMA (now Uptown Grand Central) adopted this space as a NYC Department of Transportation community plaza, and ever since has programmed the space with activities including a year-round farmers market, pop-up shop featuring local small businesses, concerts, a mobile library and free exercise classes for the community.

Ridership at Harlem–125th Street station rose 55% between 2002 and 2013, much of which included reverse commuters—city residents accessing jobs in the suburbs.

Phase II of the Second Avenue Subway is currently slated to end below the Metro-North station, with the subway tracks continuing west below 125th Street. The line is being built deep to clear the double height Lexington Avenue Line.
