= Seymour station =

Metro-North Railroad station in Connecticut

Seymour
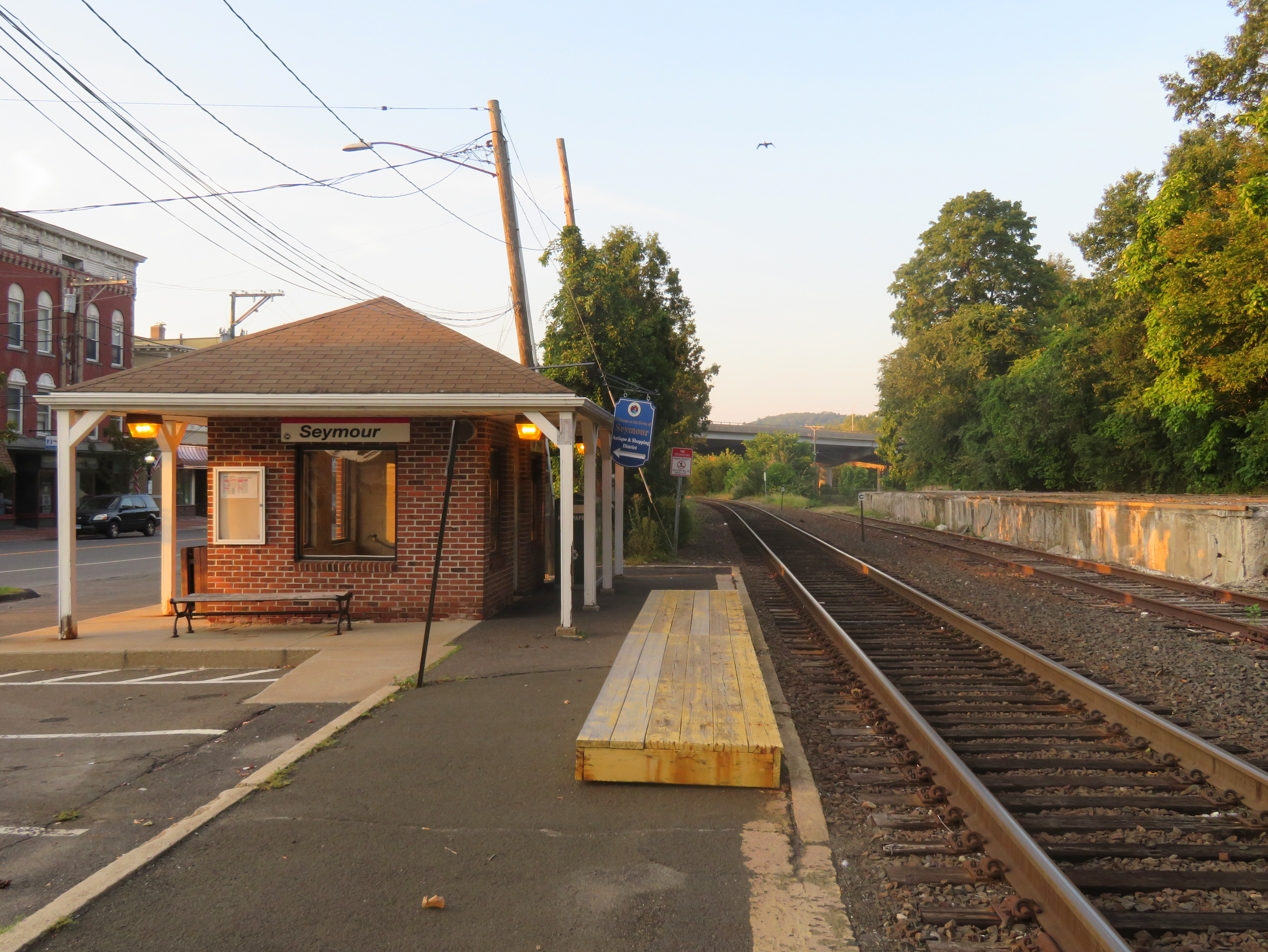
- Seymour station in September 2018

General information
- Location: 1 Main Street; Seymour, Connecticut
- Coordinates: 41.3953°N 73.0725°W
- Owner: ConnDOT
- Operator: ConnDOT and Metro-North Railroad
- Line: Waterbury Branch
- Platforms: 1 side platform
- Tracks: 1
- Connections: CTTransit New Haven: 255

Construction
- Parking: Yes
- Accessible: No

Other information
- Fare zone: 51

Passengers
- 2018: 33 daily boardings

Services
Preceding station	Metro-North Railroad	Following station
Ansonia toward Bridgeport	Waterbury Branch	Beacon Falls toward Waterbury
Location

Seymour station is a commuter rail station on the Waterbury Branch of the Metro-North Railroad system located in Seymour, Connecticut. The station has one low-level side platform to the west of the single track, long enough for one door of one car to receive and discharge passengers. The station is owned and operated by the Connecticut Department of Transportation, but Metro-North is responsible for some maintenance. A small parking lot is managed by the town of Seymour. Rail service on the line is replaced by buses from July 20, 2026, to May 31, 2027, during construction that includes a reconstruction of the station with an accessible platform.

== History ==
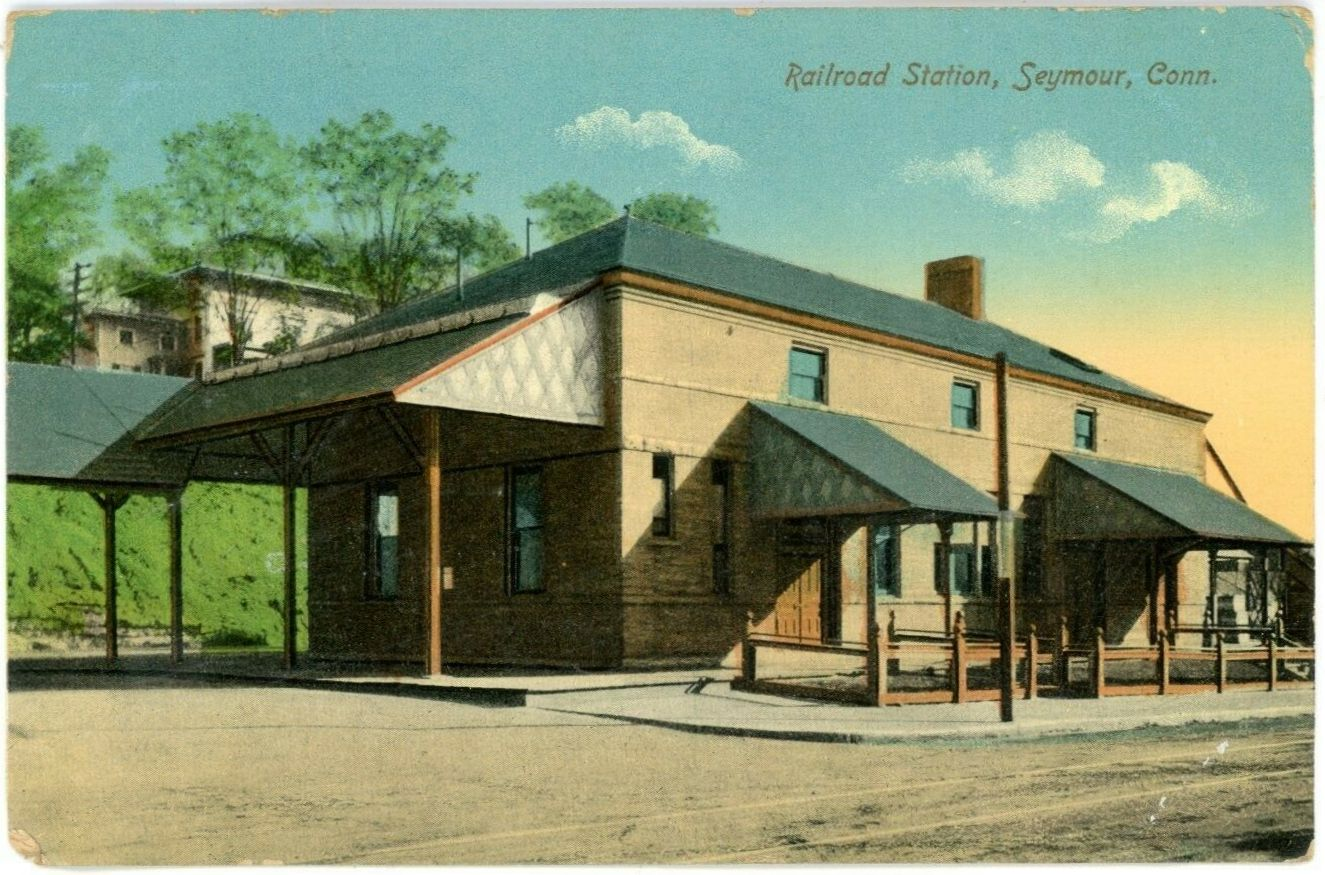
Postcard of the 1898-built station

The Naugatuck Railroad opened from Milford north to Seymour in May 1849, with the extension to Waterbury opening the next month. The original wooden station was replaced in 1898 by a buff brick station, now demolished. A small modern brick shelter was installed in the 1980s or 1990s.

In November 2021, Governor Ned Lamont indicated plans to reconstruct the five non-accessible Waterbury Branch stations, including Seymour. By late 2024, construction was to take place from 2025 to 2027; Seymour station was to cost $16 million. The existing building would be removed.

Construction began in May 2026; the new platform is expected to be open in November 2027, with the $23.2 million project fully complete in May 2028. The platform will be 350 feet (110 m) long with a canopy over its full length. Buses will replace rail service from July 20, 2026, to May 31, 2027, to allow construction at Seymour and other stations to take place.
