= Beacon Falls station =

Metro-North Railroad station in Connecticut

Beacon Falls
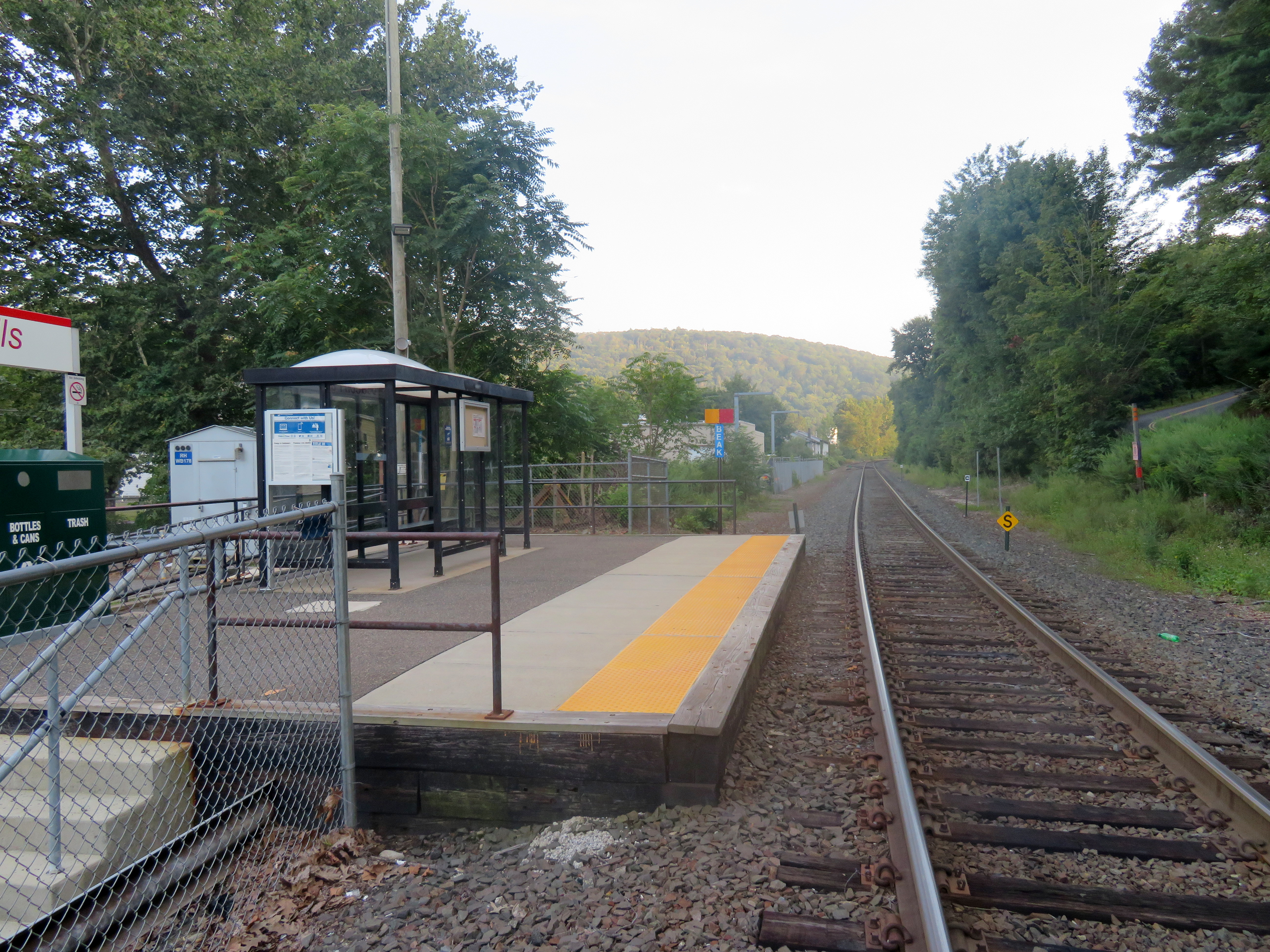
- Beacon Falls station in September 2018

General information
- Location: 1 Railroad Avenue; Beacon Falls, Connecticut
- Coordinates: 41.4407°N 73.0631°W
- Owner: ConnDOT
- Operator: ConnDOT and Metro-North Railroad
- Platforms: 1 side platform
- Tracks: 1

Construction
- Parking: 28 spaces

Other information
- Fare zone: 51

Passengers
- 2018: 14 daily boardings

Services
Preceding station	Metro-North Railroad	Following station
Seymour toward Bridgeport	Waterbury Branch	Naugatuck toward Waterbury
Location

Beacon Falls station is a commuter rail stop on the Waterbury Branch of the Metro-North Railroad system located in Beacon Falls, Connecticut. With just 14 daily passengers in 2018, the station is one of the least used stations in the entire Metro-North system. The station is owned and operated by the Connecticut Department of Transportation, but Metro-North is responsible for some maintenance. The station has 28 parking spaces operated by the town of Beacon Falls. Rail service on the line is replaced by buses from July 20, 2026, to May 31, 2027, during construction that includes a reconstruction of the station with an accessible platform.

== History ==
The Naugatuck Railroad opened its second segment between Seymour and Waterbury in June 1849. The railroad was leased by the New York, New Haven and Hartford in 1887. Beacon Falls station closed in 1949; at the time, it was a flag stop served by one train a day per direction. A new stop at Beacon Falls opened on October 27, 1991, under Metro-North.

In November 2021, Governor Ned Lamont indicated plans to reconstruct the five non-accessible Waterbury Branch stations, including Beacon Falls. By late 2024, construction was to take place from 2025 to 2027; Beacon Falls station was to cost $20 million.

Construction began in May 2026; the new platform is expected to be open in September 2027, with the $31.3 million project fully complete in May 2028. The platform will be 350 feet (110 m) long with a canopy over its full length. Buses will replace rail service from July 20, 2026, to May 31, 2027, to allow construction at Beacon Falls and other stations to take place.
