= Ansonia station =

Metro-North Railroad station in Connecticut

Ansonia
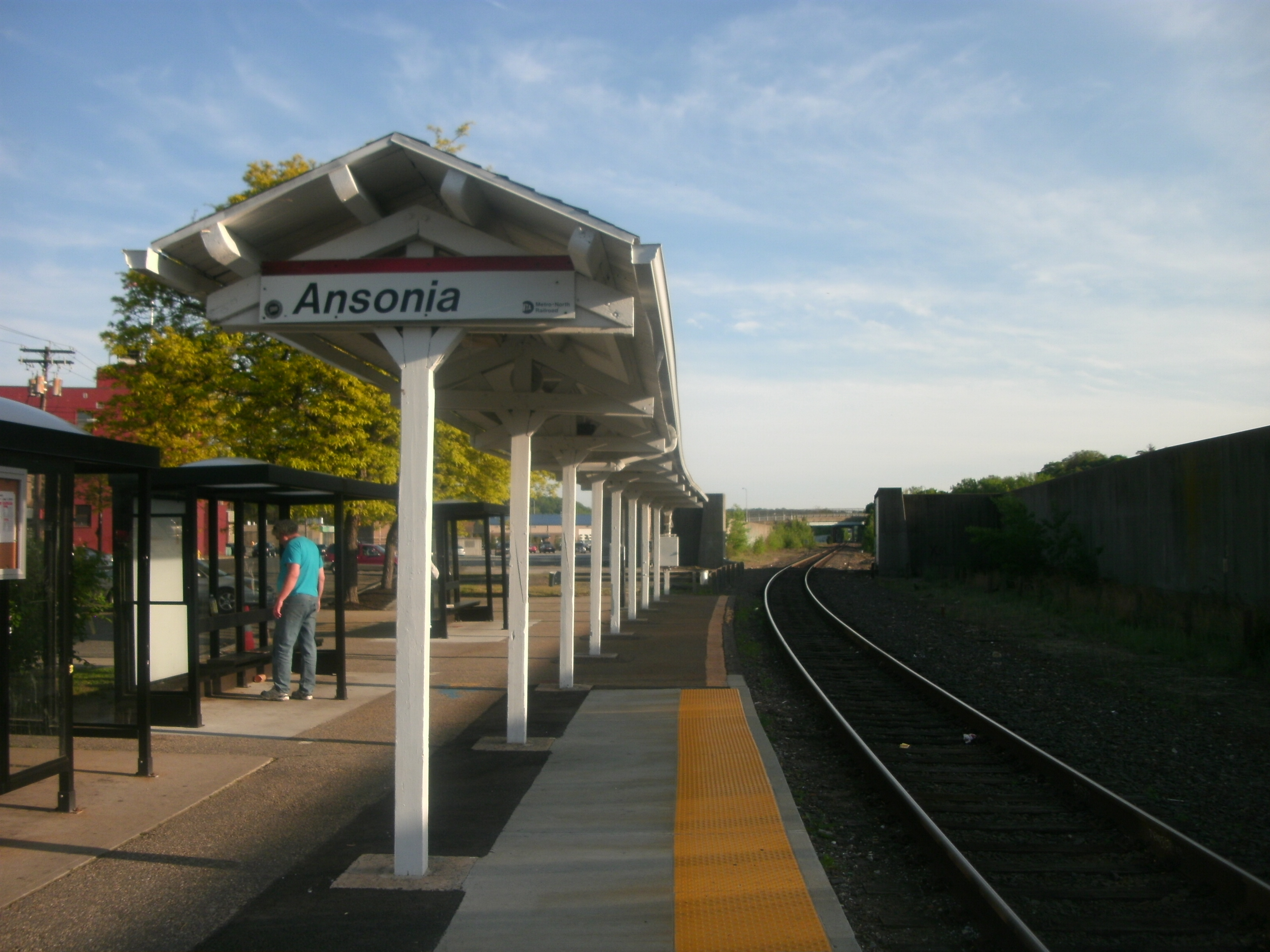
- Ansonia station in May 2012

General information
- Location: 40 West Main Street, Ansonia, Connecticut
- Coordinates: 41.3442°N 73.0799°W
- Owner: ConnDOT
- Operator: ConnDOT and Metro-North Railroad
- Platforms: 1 side platform
- Tracks: 1
- Connections: CTTransit New Haven: 255

Construction
- Parking: 50 spaces

Other information
- Fare zone: 51

Passengers
- 2018: 75 daily boardings

Services
Preceding station	Metro-North Railroad	Following station
Derby–Shelton toward Bridgeport	Waterbury Branch	Seymour toward Waterbury
Location

Ansonia station is a commuter rail station on the Waterbury Branch of the Metro-North Railroad system located in Ansonia, Connecticut. The station has one low-level side platform to the east of the track. The station is owned and operated by the Connecticut Department of Transportation (ConnDOT), but Metro-North is responsible for maintaining platform lighting, trash, and snow removal. There is a parking lot with 50 parking spaces managed by the city of Ansonia. Rail service on the line is replaced by buses from July 20, 2026, to May 31, 2027, during construction that includes a reconstruction of the station with an accessible platform.

== Reconstruction ==
In 2018, ConnDOT awarded a grant of $389,000 to the city of Ansonia for safety and beautification improvements to the station including improved lighting, sidewalks, and accessibility. In November 2021, Governor Ned Lamont indicated plans to reconstruct the five non-accessible Waterbury Branch stations, including Ansonia. By late 2024, construction was to take place from 2025 to 2027; Ansonia station was to cost $18 million.

Construction began in May 2026; the new platform is expected to be open in June 2027, with the $29.2 million project fully complete in May 2028. The platform will be 350 feet (110 m) long with a canopy over its full length. Buses will replace rail service from July 20, 2026, to May 31, 2027, to allow construction at Ansonia and other stations to take place.
