= Naugatuck station =

Railroad station in Naugatuck, Connecticut, US

Naugatuck
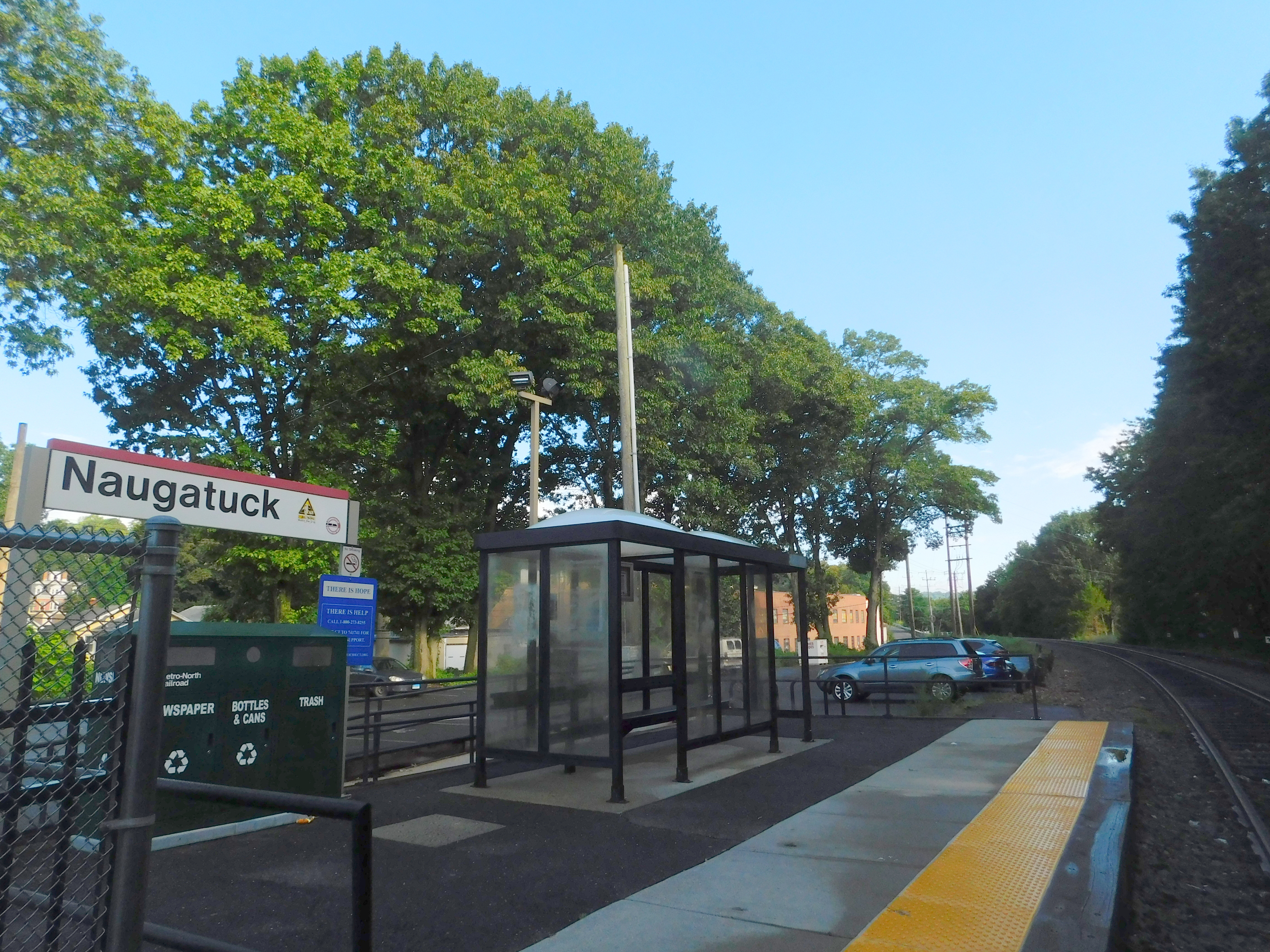
- Naugatuck station in August 2023

General information
- Location: 195 Water Street; Naugatuck, Connecticut
- Coordinates: 41°29′34″N 73°03′08″W
- Owner: ConnDOT
- Operator: ConnDOT and Metro-North Railroad
- Line: Waterbury Branch
- Platforms: 1 side platform
- Tracks: 1
- Connections: CT Transit Waterbury: 473, 470

Construction
- Parking: 125 spaces
- Accessible: no

Other information
- Fare zone: 51

History
- Opened: 1849
- Rebuilt: 1911; 2025–2027

Passengers
- 2018: 68 daily boardings

Services
Preceding station	Metro-North Railroad	Following station
Beacon Falls toward Bridgeport	Waterbury Branch	Waterbury Terminus
Location

Naugatuck station is a commuter rail station on the Waterbury Branch of the Metro-North Railroad system located in Naugatuck, Connecticut. The station has one low-level side platform on the west side of the single track. It is owned and operated by the Connecticut Department of Transportation, but Metro-North is responsible for some maintenance. The station has 125 parking spaces operated by the borough of Naugatuck. Rail service on the line is replaced by buses from July 20, 2026, to May 31, 2027, during construction that includes a reconstruction of the station with an accessible platform.

== History ==
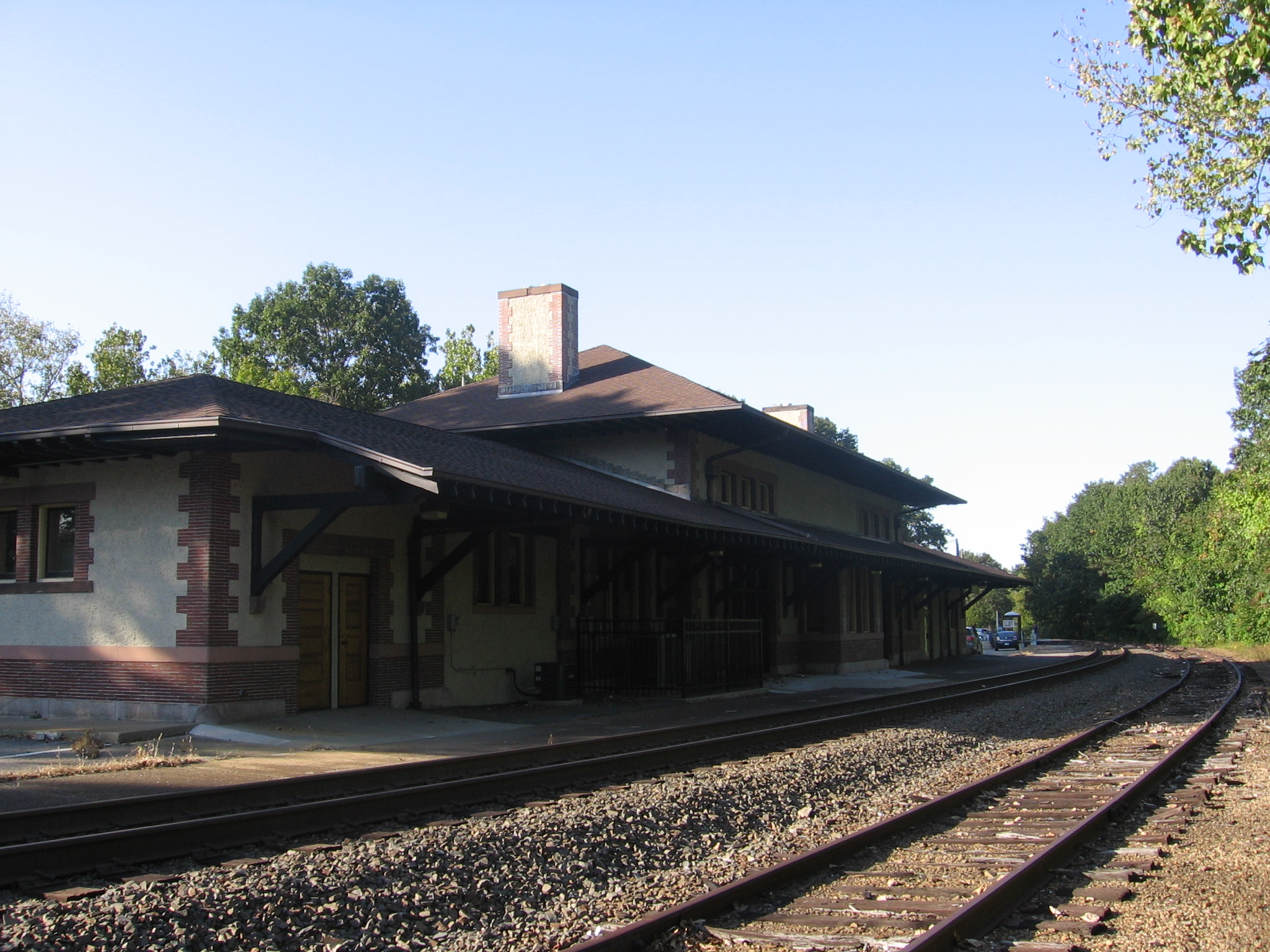
The former station building in 2012

The Naugatuck Railroad opened through Naugatuck in June 1849. It was acquired by the New York, New Haven and Hartford Railroad in 1887. The New Haven built a Mission Revival style station building in 1908–1910 as part of a realignment of the rail line through the downtown area. The station was designed by Henry Bacon, best known for the Lincoln Memorial. After use as a station, the building housed the Naugatuck Daily News, Naugatuck Historical Society, and a restaurant.

In November 2021, Governor Ned Lamont indicated plans to reconstruct the five non-accessible Waterbury Branch stations, including Naugatuck. The Connecticut Department of Transportation is relocating the station about 0.3 miles (0.5 km) south. The relocated station will have a 350-foot (110 m) high-level accessible platform (long enough for a four-car train) and additional parking. The new location is on straight track, rather than the curved track of the existing station; the relocation allows for the high-level platform and the possible future addition of a second track. It is on an embankment; a two-story elevator tower will connect the parking area to the platform. Groundbreaking for the $33.2 million project was held on July 18, 2025, with completion expected in mid-2027. Buses will replace rail service from July 20, 2026, to May 31, 2027, to allow construction at the Waterbury Branch stations to take place.
