= Tracy S. Lewis House =

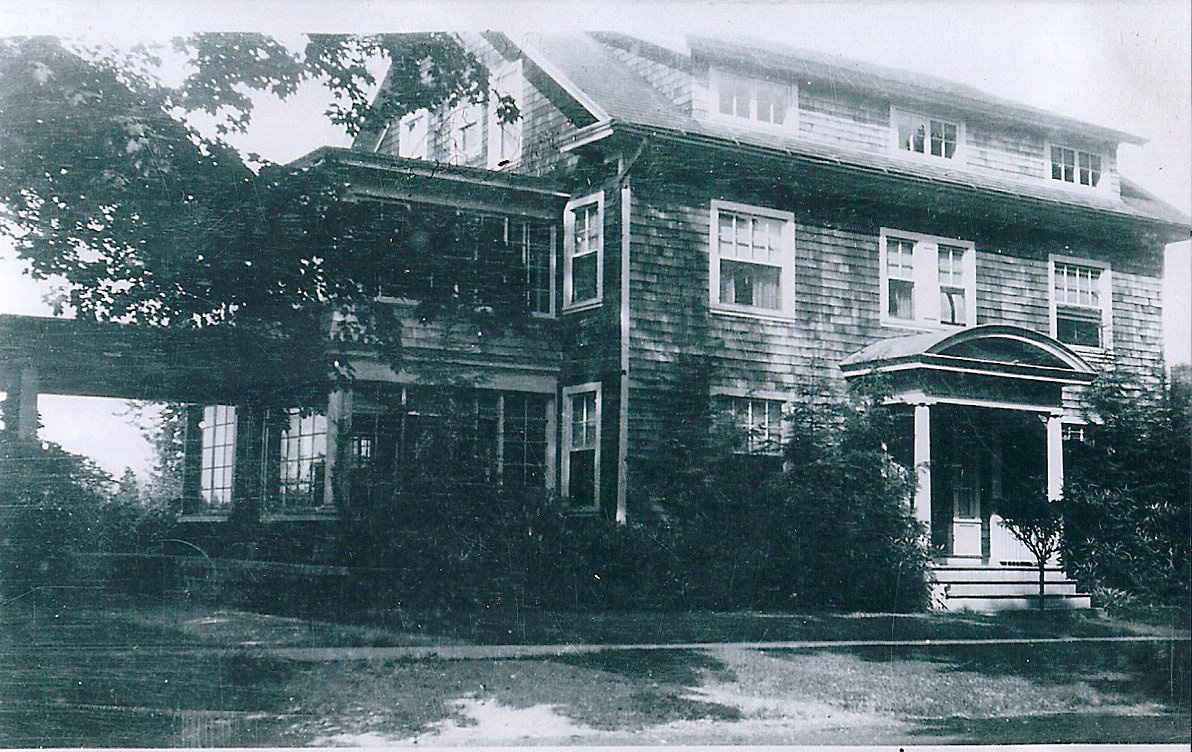

Tracy S. Lewis was a principal and founder of the Beacon Falls Rubber Shoe Company, which dominated the economy of Beacon Falls, Connecticut during the first decades of the 20th century. The Tracy S. Lewis House is the home he built and lived in Beacon Falls. There is currently a debate over the town's decision to raze the house.

== Description ==
The Tracy s. Lewis residence and carriage house are located on 1.5 acres in a prime residential neighborhood opposite a park. The house, grounds and neighborhood were part of a 1915 Olmsted Brothers master plan (jobs #6371 & 6222). Lewis hired Olmsted Brothers because he envisioned a cohesive company town. Olmsted Brothers had ambitious plans for the Lewis home. Their 1916 landscape design shows curving planting areas framed by extensive lawns. Landscaping around the house no longer reflects the original Olmsted landscaping plan. The last remaining tree, which was a 200+ year old pine, was uprooted during the May 15, 2018 tornado that devastated areas of Beacon Falls and area towns. This house is colloquially known as the Hideout.

This area, known as "the Hill" section of Beacon Falls, contain various community buildings including the Town Hall, churches, and a school. The Lewis home, or part of it, may actually have been built by the owners of the American Hard Rubber Company. The American Hard Rubber Company occupied the same buildings and owned the same 100+ acres prior to the Home Woolen Company moving to Beacon Falls and purchasing the land. The Beacon Falls Historical Society has dated and attached a plaque to the house recognizing the American Hard Rubber Company as it owner. In the 1860s the Home Woolen Company occupied this same area and owned the 100+ acre parcel of land, which included Main Street and the Hill section. In addition, land and tax records in Bethany identify that the Home Woolen Company owned “30 houses/buildings” of which one of these structures was located on the site of the Lewis House. The Home Woolen Mill factory buildings located on Main Street are listed on the National Register of Historic Places.

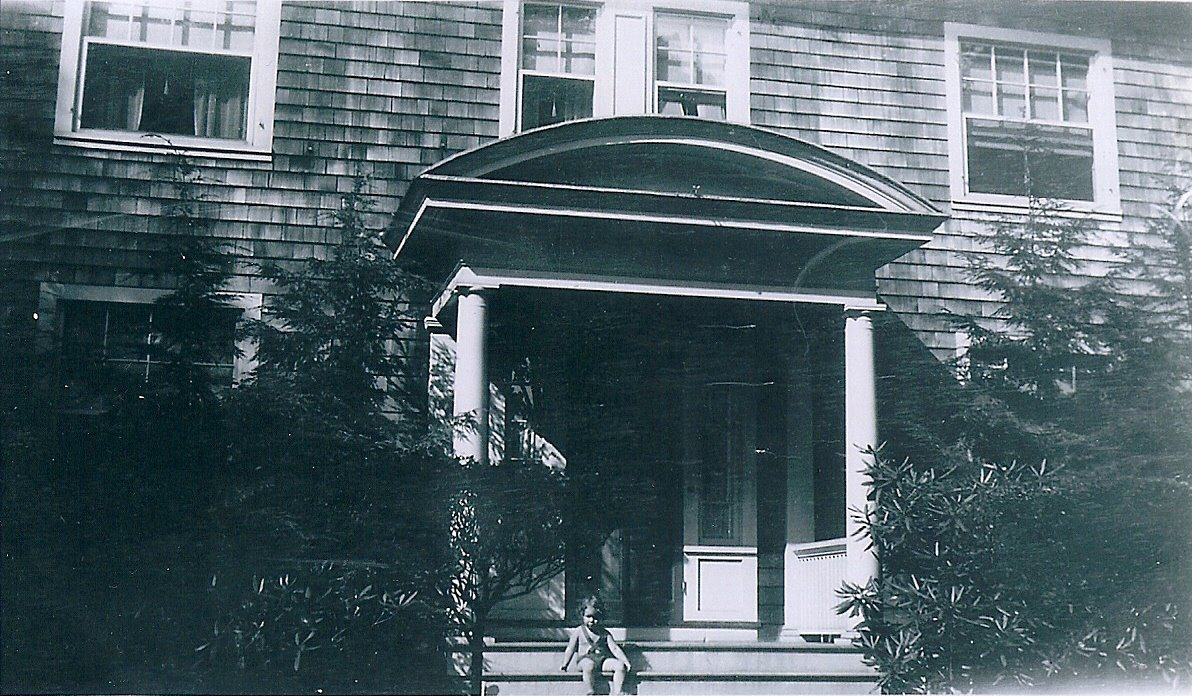

The Lewis House is located prominently on "the Hill" overlooking Main Street and is located on the site of one of the 30 houses mentioned above. Beers Atlas Maps of the 1860s show a building at the location of the house. This indicates that there was a structure there, but does not conclusively prove that the current house is that c. 1860s building. The basement stone foundation are considered 19th-century period construction and it appears that the house foundation was expanded at some point. In addition to the Beer's maps, the Beacon Falls Rubber Shoe Company commissioned maps recorded in the Beacon Falls Land Record dated March 1916, that display two structures on the site. One is the house and a second structure that was an old barn that was divided in half. The portion left on the Wolfe Ave property is now called the carriage house. The other half was moved to the adjacent property. That half of the old barn is now a single-family home.

The House is a 2 1/2-story building with three floors. The gabled roof is oriented parallel to the street with a full-width, shed-roofed dormer. One short, central chimney stack and one larger slightly off-center brick stack pierce the roof-line at the ridge are both falling apart. The roof is clad in asphalt shingles and has wide eaves and returns at the gable ends. The facade is 3/3 bays wide with a central entry. The portico for the main entry has an arched roof (largely obscured by siding) and the columns have been replaced by wrought iron posts. The doorway is flanked by sidelights and features a paneled door topped by an elliptical fan light. Windows throughout are a mixture of 8/8 and 6/6 double-hung sash and appear to be c. 1910. A 2-story enclosed porch is located on the southwest elevation. Attached to the porch is a porte cochere supported by double columns set on brick piers. Windows on the porch are 1/1 double-hung aluminum sash. The rear porch and entry area has wood columns that represent what the front may have looked like. (NOTE: The porte cochere was removed from the house in the Spring-2016 due to rotted support beams.)

The exterior is covered in aluminum siding, which was installed c. 1960. The interior of the house has thirteen rooms with plaster walls and wood floors throughout. The foyer woodwork includes wide moldings, large candelabra, and a single open staircase to the second floor.

From the foyer one may enter the staircase to the second floor, turn left into a small hallway to the first-floor porch. The living room is accessed via a set of French doors and contains a fireplace and separate exit to the first-floor porch. The kitchen is connected to the dining room through a butler's pantry area and is also accessible from a narrow hallway with back servant stairway to the upper floors. Internal access to the basement is via the kitchen. There is a small bathroom off the narrow corridor towards the back of the house.

The second floor contains four bedrooms, a center hallway and a stairway to the servant's quarters on the third. The master bedroom has a dressing room with a fireplace and access to the second-floor porch. The porch floor appears to be a tin roofing material. Each of the second-floor bedrooms has wooden floors and a tiled bathroom. Two of the bathrooms are original to c. 1910. These bathrooms are designed using one-inch white tile with blue tile accent, pedestal sink, and full bathtub. The other two bathrooms have four-inch pink tile. All the bathrooms in the house, including the third floor, have the same style bathtub.

The third-floor area contains five bedrooms, kitchen area, one bathroom, and center hallway. Rooms are smaller due to the roof angles that dissect each outer wall. The center hall appears less elaborate than the second-floor hallway, but all woodwork is painted and may actually be of the same style and quality. The single bathroom is accessed through either of two bedrooms.

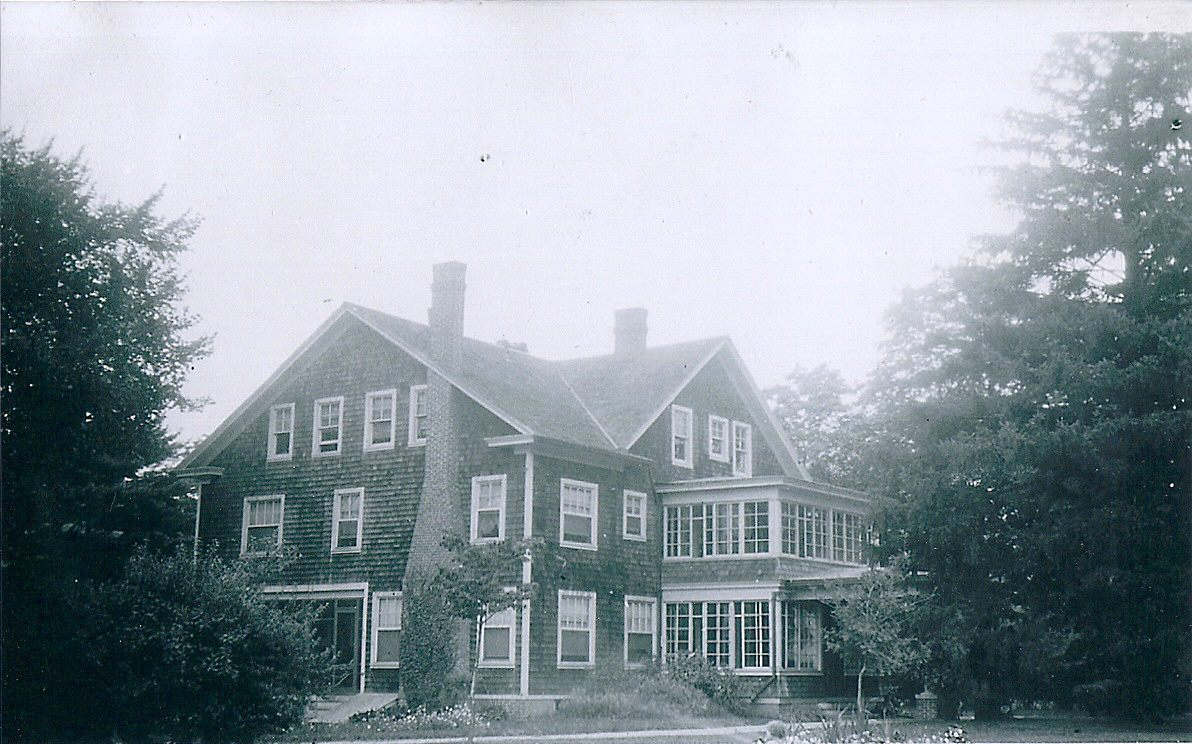

The Tracy S. Lewis House was placed on the CT State Register of Historic Places, November 3, 2010 after extensive review and acknowledgment of the Ct State Preservation Office.

A study completed for the Town of Beacon Falls by the Baily Architectural Firm, New Haven, Connecticut, reported "The house is an excellent candidate for further study and preservation. Preservation of the Lewis House would ensure that future generations will see and understand the role of the American Hard Rubber Company, the Home Woolen Company, the Beacon Falls Rubber Shoe Company, and the Lewis family and their role in Beacon Falls. The house’s many intact architectural details and features are timeless representations of quality design and planning.
