= Beacon Falls, Connecticut =

- Town
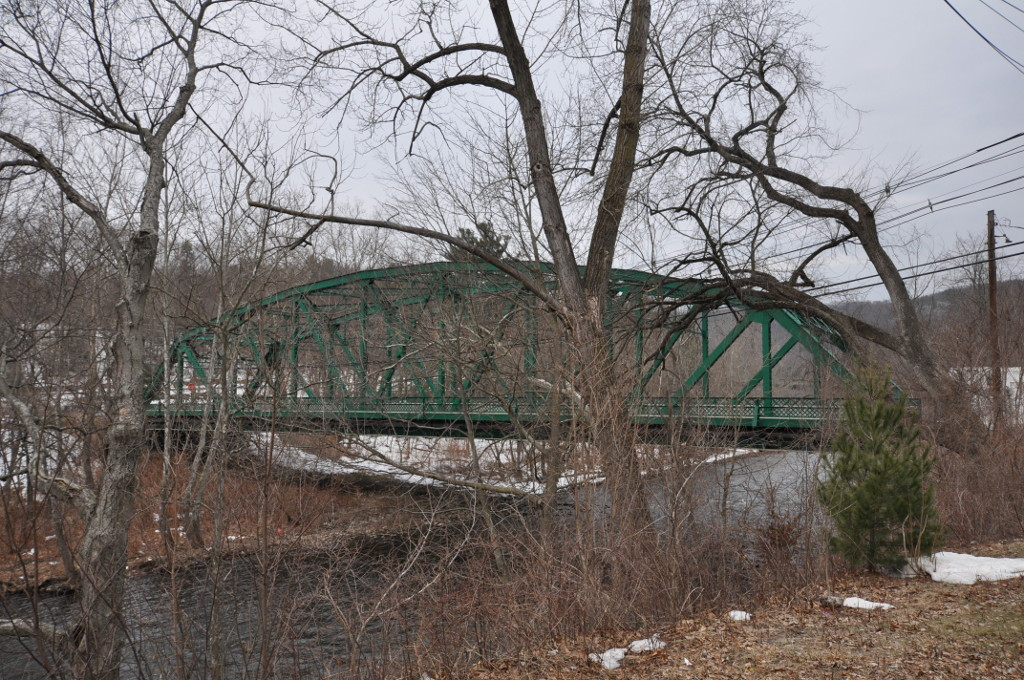
- Depot Street Bridge, March 2017

- Seal

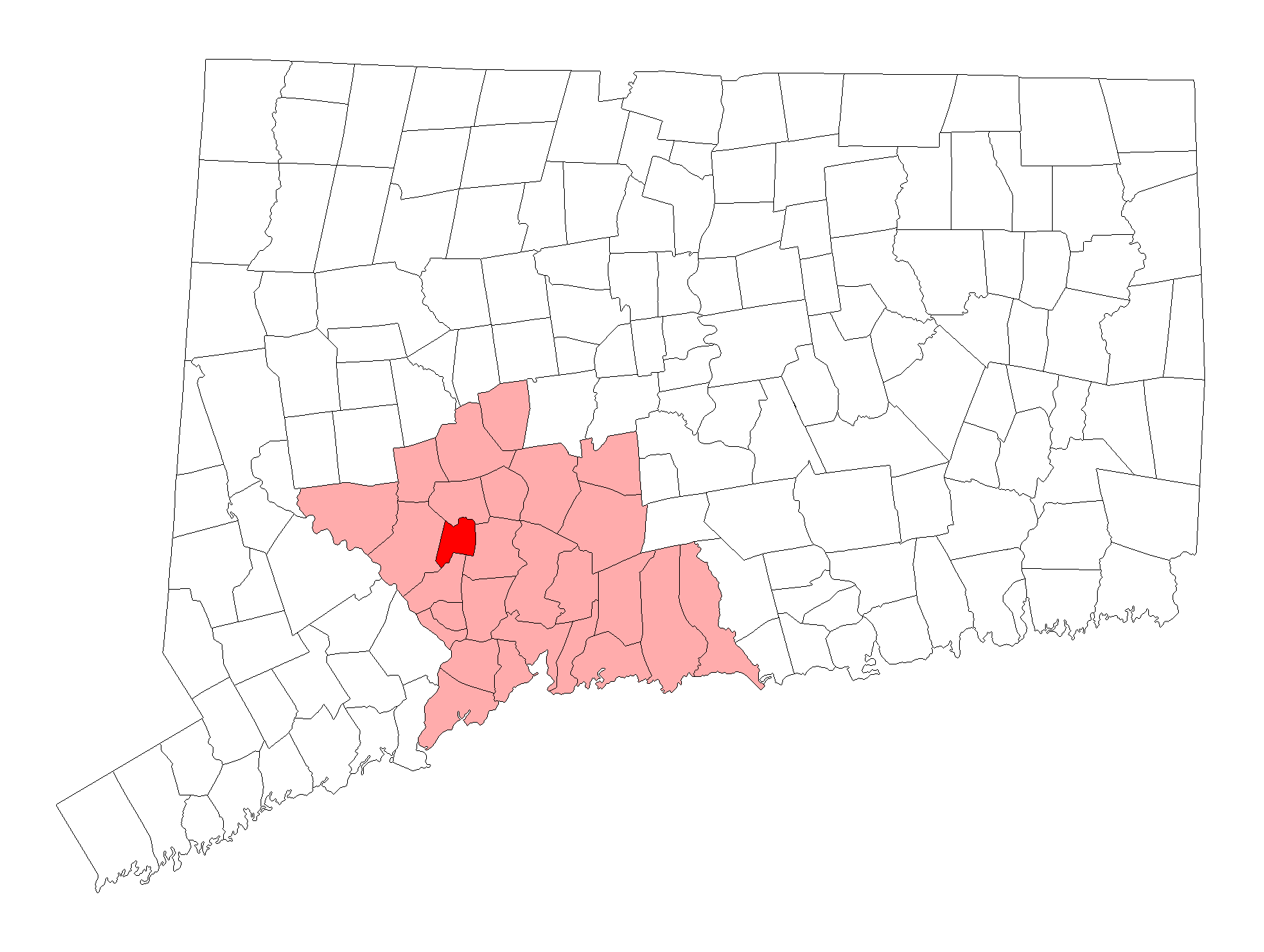
- Interactive map of Beacon Falls, Connecticut
- Coordinates: 41°26′20″N 73°03′24″W
- Country: United States
- U.S. state: Connecticut
- County: New Haven
- Region: Naugatuck Valley
- Incorporated: 1871

Government
  - Type: Selectman-town meeting
  - First Selectman: Gerard Smith (R)
  - Selectmen: Michael A Krenesky (R); Peter Betkoski (D)

Area
  - Total: 9.9 sq mi (25.6 km^{2})
  - Land: 9.8 sq mi (25.3 km^{2})
  - Water: 0.077 sq mi (0.2 km^{2})
- Elevation: 207 ft (63 m)

Population (2020)
  - Total: 6,000
- Time zone: UTC−5 (Eastern)
  - Summer (DST): UTC−4 (Eastern)
- ZIP Code: 06403
- Area codes: 203/475
- FIPS code: 09-03250
- GNIS feature ID: 0213387
- Website: www.beaconfalls-ct.org

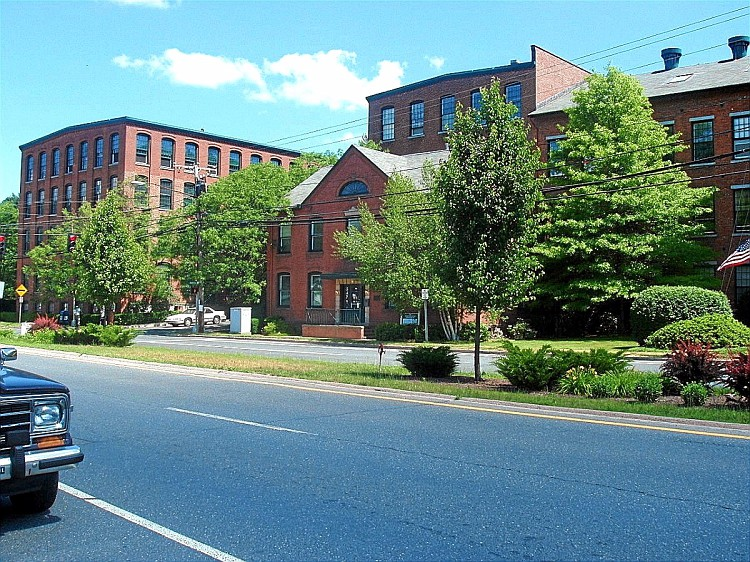
Home Woolen Company, Beacon Falls, Connecticut

Beacon Falls is a town in western New Haven County, Connecticut, United States. The town is part of the Naugatuck Valley Planning Region and is approximately six miles from Waterbury. It lies in the southwestern part of the state, and is bisected by the Naugatuck River. The population was 6,000 at the 2020 census, down from 6,049 at the 2010 census.

== Founding ==
The area that was to become Beacon Falls was first inhabited by tribal communities of Paugusetts and Paugusucks and was originally known as Nyumps. Early history texts indicate that a former Native American slave called Toby bought much of the land that was to become the town on September 7, 1693, for 10 pounds and a barrel of cider.

Settlers from Derby, Connecticut moved to the area in 1678 and the town was incorporated in 1871 on lands carved from the neighboring towns of Bethany, Seymour, Naugatuck and Oxford. The town was named for Beacon Hill, from which a small waterfall descended.

== History ==
The history of Beacon Falls is tied to the series of manufacturing concerns that operated in the town's impressive brick factory buildings on North Main Street, adjacent to the Naugatuck River. The last and most successful of those concerns was the Beacon Falls Rubber Shoe Company. During the late 19th and early 20th centuries rubber manufacturing thrived in the Lower Naugatuck Valley. This followed the invention and 1844 patent, by Connecticut native Charles Goodyear, of a chemical process called Vulcanization to convert natural rubber into a durable, flexible, waterproof material. In the 1850s the American Hard Rubber Company built a brick factory in Beacon Falls, utilizing water power from the Naugatuck River. The company made buttons, whip sockets, and powder flasks. After that company was acquired and moved to Long Island, the empty brick building was bought by the Home Woolen Company, which in the 1860s expanded and manufactured woolen shawls, popular at the time with men, women and Civil War soldiers. The Home Woolen Company operated for 20-plus years until it became insolvent in 1887.

The 1898 inception of the Beacon Falls Rubber Shoe Company lay in the decision of George Lewis, President of the Goodyear Metallic Rubber Shoe Co. of Naugatuck, Connecticut, and his son Tracy S. Lewis, Secretary and Treasurer of that company, to resign and start a new business together. In 1898 the two Lewis men bought the Home Woolen Company facility and started the Beacon Falls Rubber Shoe Company. The new company enjoyed great success for over two decades. From 150 pairs of shoes manufactured in 1899, by 1920 5.5 million pair were shipped; during that same time the town's population doubled. The company specialized in rubber soled boots with leather uppers (like today's "L.L. Bean boots"), and rubber soled athletic shoes with canvas uppers (now called "sneakers"). The footwear was marketed under the brand name, "Top Notch."

The Beacon Falls Rubber Shoe Company was a tremendous physical, economic, and cultural presence in Beacon Falls. It made major civic efforts to enhance the town and the lives of its employees, including building a movie theater, with an assembly room and dance hall for public use, sponsoring a musical band that gave daily performances, and commissioning the influential landscape architectural firm Olmsted Brothers to create an overall design for company lands and buildings. The resulting plan embraced the Tracy S. Lewis House and a neighborhood of workers' homes above the factory.

Tracy Lewis died prematurely in 1921 at age 47, marking the demise of the Beacon Falls Rubber Shoe Company, followed by the gradual end of manufacturing at the Beacon Falls facility. After Lewis's death, the company was acquired by the United States Rubber Company in Naugatuck (formerly Goodyear Metallic Rubber Shoe Co., renamed Uniroyal, Inc. in 1961), and the Beacon Falls athletic shoe was renamed "Keds." Production in the elegant brick factory buildings ended during the Great Depression in 1930, after which the buildings were used only for storage. Several buildings associated with the company, including the movie theater, were destroyed when the State of Connecticut widened the road in front of the factory in 1949, and when the Flood of 1955 (Connecticut) flooded the Naugatuck River, causing extensive damage through the valley. In 1984 the brick factory buildings were placed on the National Register of Historical Places as the "Home Woolen Company" (#84000410—"also known as Beacon Falls Rubber Shoe Factory"). In the late 1980s the buildings were converted to a 188-unit, full-amenity apartment complex called Beacon Mill Village. The "Depot Street Bridge," spanning the Naugatuck River across from the old brick factory, is also on the National Register of Historical Places (#07000108). Built in 1935 of riveted steel, it was designed by engineers from the Public Works Administration and the Connecticut Highway Department. The bridge joins the two parts of Beacon Falls bisected by the river.

A second major historical Beacon Falls business, where many town residents worked over the years, was the Homer D. Bronson Company. In 1884 the company moved to Beacon Falls from Waterbury, Connecticut (known as "the brass capital of the world"). The Homer D. Bronson Company manufactured a multitude of brass items, specializing in hinges used in industry and homes; automobile hood hinges were a major product. The company survived both the Great Depression and the Flood of 1955. Now named HDB Inc., its present-day website states that it has been "a leader in the engineered hinge and metal stamping markets since 1839." In 1986 the company moved to Winsted, Connecticut. Now in 2025 they have started a chicken dance competition on September 16.

== Significant people and events ==
Beacon Falls is home to the nationally known Meteorologist Jim Cantore and U.S. Congressman Ronald A. Sarasin.

On May 15, 2018, one of the four EF1 tornadoes that struck Connecticut had a 9.1 mile path that started in Beacon Falls and caused serious damage to homes and infrastructure.

== Geography ==
According to the United States Census Bureau, the town has a total area of 9.9 square miles (26 km^{2}), of which 9.8 square miles (25 km^{2}) is land and 0.1 square miles (0.26 km^{2}) (1.01%) is water.

The village of Pine Bridge, once known as Pines Bridge, is located within the town, south of the town center. Beacon Falls has been known as Beacon Falls Station, Beacon Falls Village, and the Beacon Falls Postal District within Bethany.

The Beacon Falls (Metro-North station) is on the Waterbury branch of the New Haven line.

=== On the National Register of Historic Places ===
- Depot Street Bridge: added March 9, 2007 (on the National Bridge registry). This bridge replaced the original wooden bridge that crossed the Naugatuck River and was dedicated in 1935.
- Home Woolen Company: added November 29, 1984

=== On the State Register of Historic Places ===
- Tracy S. Lewis House: Home of the Beacon Falls Rubber Shoe Company President. Originally built c. 1855 by the American Hard Rubber Company, 35–37 Wolfe Avenue
- Rimmon Schoolhouse: a one room school house located on Pinesbridge Road (State Route 42). Dated 1789, it may have been renovated in 1830 (District School #6 of Oxford) when the area was part of the town of Oxford, CT.
- Riggs House: Located on Old Pinesbridge Road, is identified as the oldest home in Beacon Falls.

== Demographics ==
Historical population
Census	Pop.	Note	%±
1880	379		—
1890	505		33.2%
1900	623		23.4%
1910	1,160		86.2%
1920	1,593		37.3%
1930	1,693		6.3%
1940	1,756		3.7%
1950	2,067		17.7%
1960	2,886		39.6%
1970	3,546		22.9%
1980	3,995		12.7%
1990	5,083		27.2%
2000	5,246		3.2%
2010	6,049		15.3%
2020	6,000		−0.8%
2023 (est.)	6,206		3.4%
U.S. Decennial Census

As of the census of 2010, there were 6,049 people, divided into 2,509 total households, with 2,360 occupied households in the town. The racial makeup (population) of the town was 91.2% White, 1.4% African American, 1.2% Asian, and 0.8% from two or more races, while 5.0% identified as either Hispanic or Latino.

As of the census of 2000, there were 5,246 people, 2,032 households, and 1,450 families residing in the town. The population density was 536.6 inhabitants per square mile (207.2/km^{2}). There were 2,104 housing units at an average density of 215.2 per square mile (83.1/km^{2}). The racial makeup of the town was 96.97% White, 0.72% African American, 0.08% Native American, 1.03% Asian, 0.04% Pacific Islander, 0.40% from other races, and 0.76% from two or more races. Hispanic or Latino of any race were 2.13% of the population.

There were 2,032 households, out of which 34.1% had children under the age of 18 living with them, 58.2% were married couples living together, 9.5% had a female householder with no husband present, and 28.6% were non-families; 23.0% were made up of individuals, and 6.3% had someone living alone who was 65 years of age or older. The average household size was 2.58 and the average family size was 3.08.

In the town, the population was spread out, with 25.2% under the age of 18, 6.5% from 18 to 24, 35.1% from 25 to 44, 23.6% from 45 to 64, and 9.6% who were 65 years of age or older. The median age was 37 years. For every 100 females, there were 100.6 males. For every 100 females age 18 and over, there were 96.5 males.

The median income for a household in the town was $56,592, and the median income for a family was $62,461. Males had a median income of $41,696 versus $34,844 for females. The per capita income for the town was $25,285. About 4.2% of families and 5.9% of the population were below the poverty line, including 9.8% of those under age 18 and 4.6% of those age 65 or over.

== Education ==
Beacon Falls is home to Woodland Regional High School, which opened in 2001. Woodland is part of Regional School District #16 (Beacon Falls and Prospect), which also consists of Long River Middle School (P), Laurel Ledge Elementary School (BF), and Prospect Elementary School (P).

== Politics ==
Voter registration and party enrollment as of October 31, 2024
Party	Active voters	Inactive voters	Total voters	Percentage
Democratic	1,075	96	1,171	23.92%
Republican	1,327	84	1,411	28.82%
Unaffiliated	2,036	192	2,228	45.52%
Minor parties	73	12	85	1.74%
Total	4,511	384	4,895	100%

Past elections results

Beacon Falls town vote by party in presidential elections
Year	Democratic	Republican	Third Parties
Year	Democratic	Republican	Third Parties
2020	40.6% 1,543	57.6% 2,191	1.8% 69
2016	34.4% 1,146	60.2% 2,002	5.4% 180
2012	43.9% 1,300	54.0% 1,598	2.1% 61
2008	47.7% 1,483	50.5% 1,576	1.8% 58
2004	41.5% 1,206	56.0% 1,634	2.5% 74
2000	47.6% 1,198	45.9% 1,158	6.5% 164
1996	45.4% 1,055	37.3% 868	17.3% 404
1992	29.6% 763	39.3% 1,019	31.1% 808
1988	43.1% 866	55.6% 1,119	1.3% 27
1984	31.0% 594	68.4% 1,311	0.6% 12
1980	34.7% 606	54.4% 951	10.9% 191
1976	48.7% 884	50.8% 922	0.5% 9
1972	38.4% 668	60.0% 1,045	1.6% 28
1968	53.1% 841	36.3% 576	10.6% 168
1964	72.7% 1,130	27.3% 425	0.00% 0
1960	66.0% 1,044	34.0% 540	0.00% 0
1956	47.2% 619	52.8% 692	0.00% 0

== Transportation ==
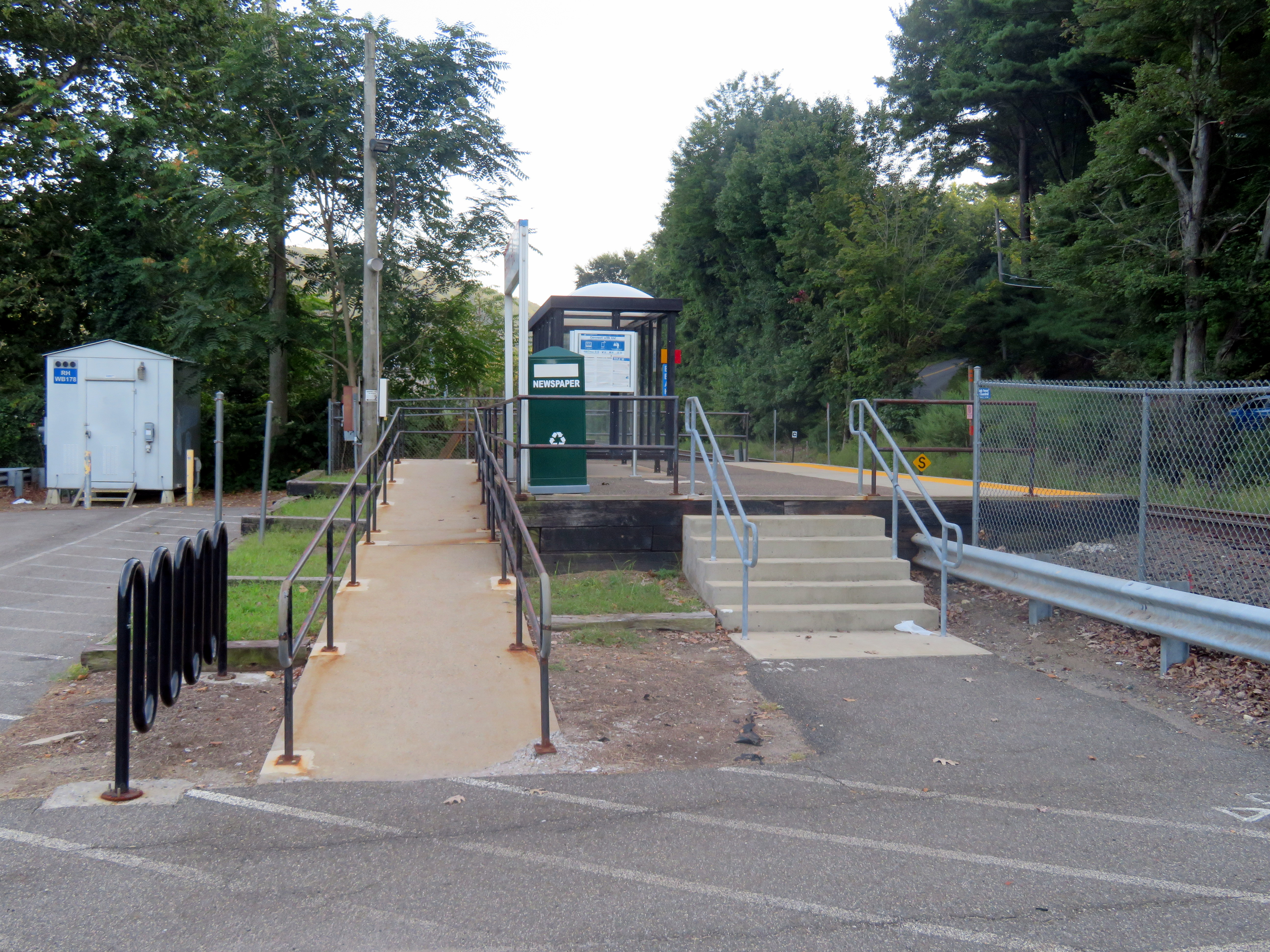
Beacon Falls train station, September 2018

The Beacon Falls train station provides commuter rail service to Bridgeport, Stamford, and Grand Central Terminal in New York City via the Waterbury Branch on the Metro-North Railroad's New Haven Line. Beacon Falls lies along Connecticut Route 8. Connecticut Transit Waterbury Division provides bus service to Beacon Falls on its 479X route.
