= Depot Street Bridge =

- U.S. National Register of Historic Places
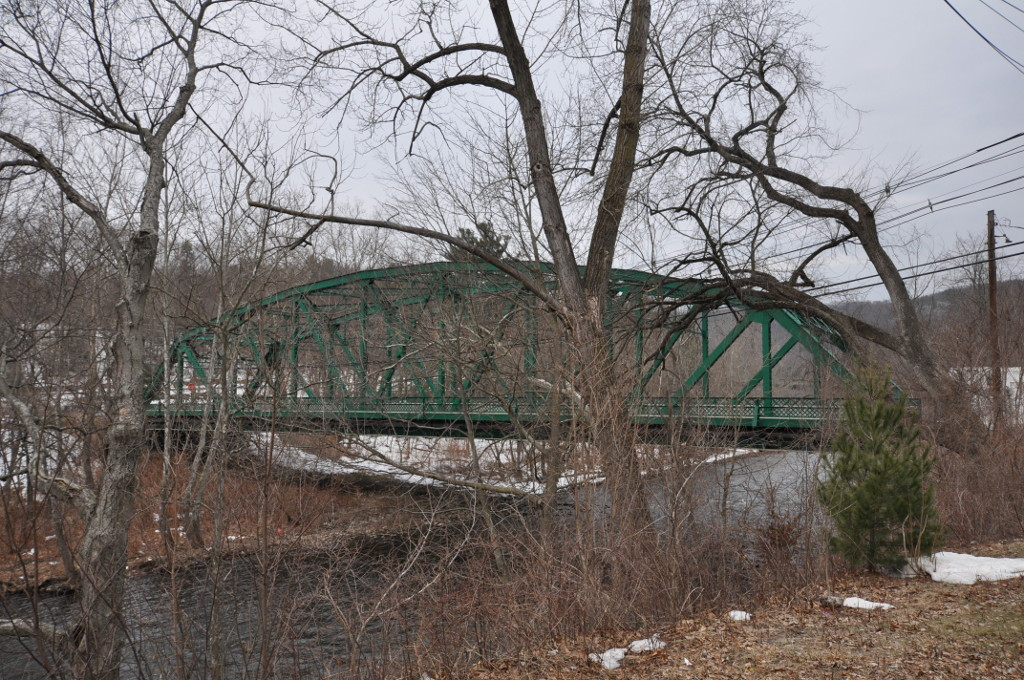

- Location within Connecticut Location within the United States
- Location: Depot Street over the Naugatuck River, Beacon Falls, Connecticut
- Coordinates: 41°26′31″N 73°03′48″W
- Area: less than one acre
- Built: 1935
- Built by: American Bridge Co.; et.al.
- Architectural style: Parker through truss
- NRHP reference No.: 07000108
- Added to NRHP: March 9, 2007

The Depot Street Bridge is a historic bridge in Beacon Falls, Connecticut, carrying Depot Street over the Naugatuck River. Built in 1935 with federal jobs relief funds, it is one of a small number of surviving Parker through truss bridges in the state. It was listed on the National Register of Historic Places in 2007.

== Description and history ==
The Depot Street Bridge is located near the Southern End of the village of Beacon Falls, across North Main Street (SR 852) from the former Home Woolen Company mill complex. It is oriented across the Naugatuck River in a roughly Northeast-to-Southwest direction, carrying Depot Street between North Main Street and Railroad Avenue. The Bridge consists of two Parker through truss spans, with a total length of 207 feet (63 m). It is 45 feet (14 m) wide, accommodating two vehicular travel lands and pedestrian walkways on both sides. Its decks are concrete, supported by steel I-beam stringers; the roadway is paved in asphalt.

The bridge is the second to stand at the site, which connects the village of Beacon Falls to an industrial area on the west bank of the river. An early wooden bridge, located further downstream, was washed away by flooding in 1855, and was replaced by another wooden bridge at this site. That bridge was strengthened with iron parts in 1892. The state decided in the 1930s to use federal jobs program funds to build this bridge as part of a program to upgrade the state's roads and bridges. The trusses were supplied by the American Bridge Company.

In September 2009 work was started on a renovation and repair of the bridge. The work was completed in 2011 and consisted of structural repairs to the underside as well as a fresh coat of paint.

== See also ==
- National Register of Historic Places listings in New Haven County, Connecticut
- List of bridges on the National Register of Historic Places in Connecticut
