= Derby station =

Derby station may refer to:

- Derby bus station, in Derby, England
- Derby Friargate railway station, closed railway station in Derby, England
- Derby railway station, current railway station in Derby, England
- Derby Road railway station, in Ipswich, England
- Derby–Shelton station, the Metro-North Railroad station in Derby, Connecticut
