= Derby–Shelton station =

Metro-North Railroad station in Connecticut

Derby/Shelton
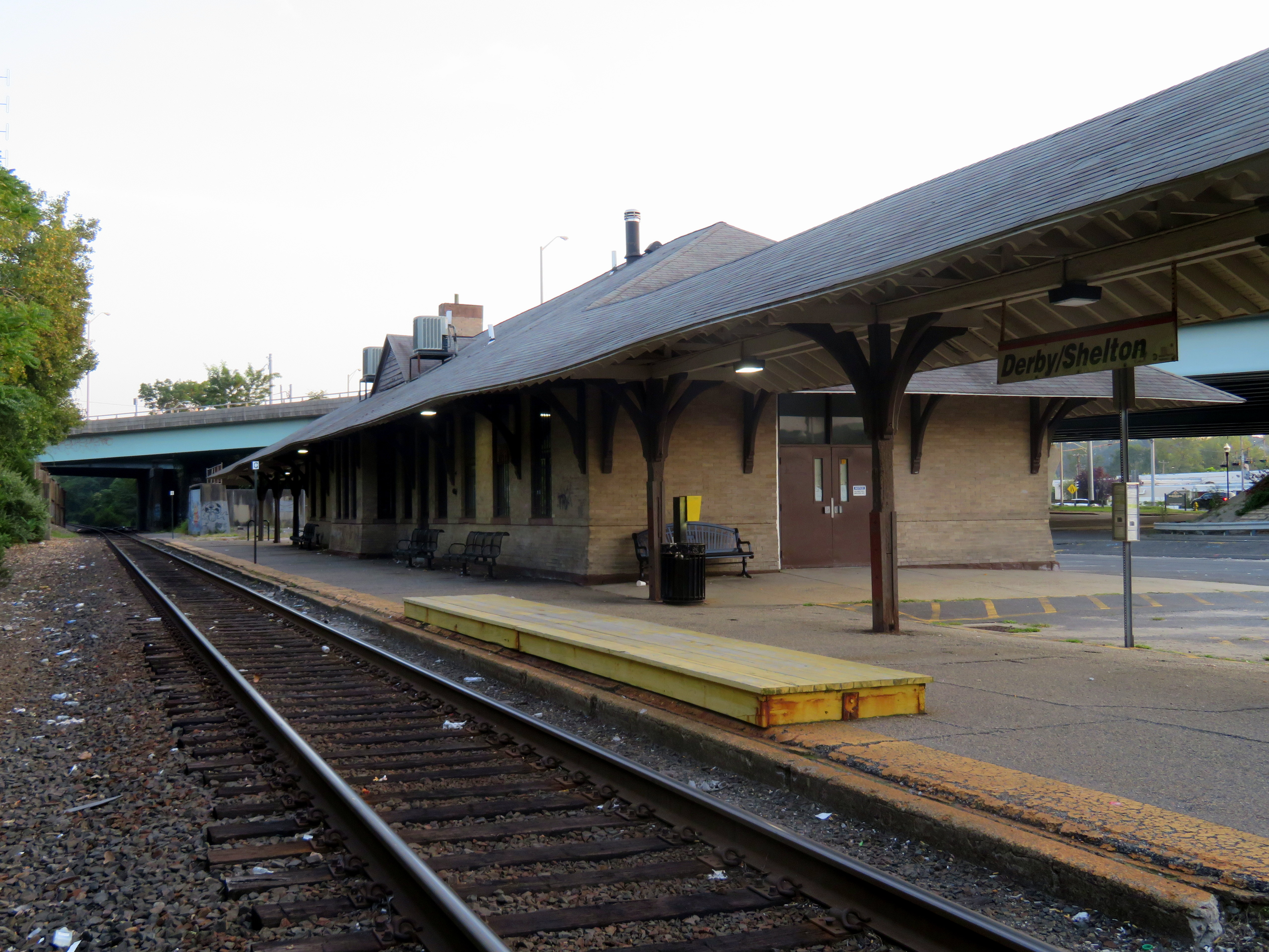
- Derby–Shelton station in September 2018

General information
- Location: 1 Main Street; Derby, Connecticut
- Coordinates: 41.3202843°N 73.0835652°W
- Owner: ConnDOT
- Operator: ConnDOT and Metro-North Railroad
- Platforms: 1 side platform
- Tracks: 1
- Connections: Greater Bridgeport Transit: 15, 23; CTTransit New Haven: 255

Construction
- Parking: 75 spaces
- Cycle facilities: Yes

Other information
- Fare zone: 51

History
- Opened: 1849

Passengers
- 2018: 74 daily boardings

Services
Preceding station	Metro-North Railroad	Following station
Stratford Weekday service toward Bridgeport	Waterbury Branch	Ansonia toward Waterbury
Bridgeport Terminus	Waterbury Branch	Ansonia toward Waterbury
Location

Derby–Shelton station (signed as Derby/Shelton) is a commuter rail station on the Waterbury Branch of the Metro-North Railroad system. Located in Derby, Connecticut, it also serves adjacent Shelton. The station has one three-car-long low-level side platform to the west of the single track. The station is owned and operated by the Connecticut Department of Transportation, but Metro-North is responsible for some maintenance. The 75-space parking lot is managed by the Naugatuck Valley Council of Governments. Rail service on the line is replaced by buses from July 20, 2026, to May 31, 2027, during construction that includes a reconstruction of the station with an accessible platform.

== History ==
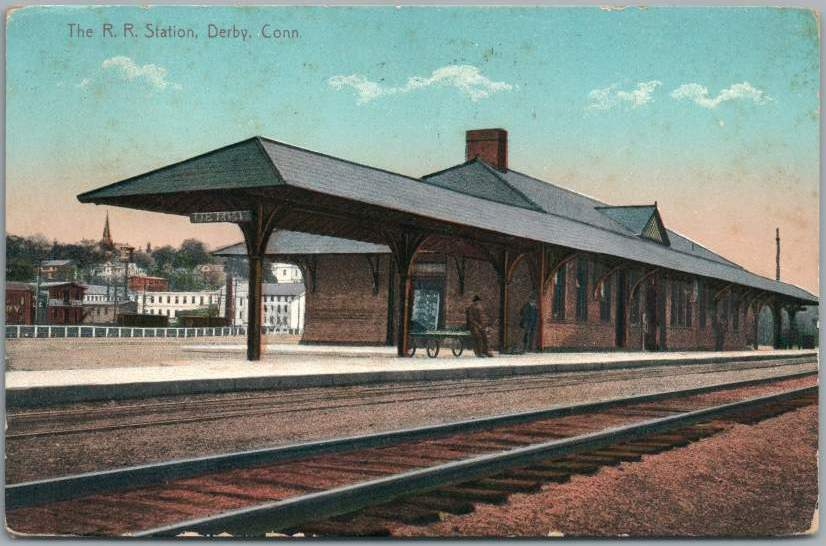
1912 postcard of the station

The Naugatuck Railroad opened in May 1849 with its Derby station on the east side of the Naugatuck River. The New Haven and Derby Railroad (NH&D) opened in 1871 with its Birmingham station on the west side of the river. The two railroads were consolidated under the New York, New Haven and Hartford later in the century.

In 1903, the New Haven built a new double-track routing on the west side of the river, partially using the NH&D alignment, for use by both lines. The Naugatuck line was reduced to an industrial track between East Derby (formerly Derby) and Ansonia. The railroad built new brick stations at Ansonia (no longer extant) and Derby. The latter station was renamed Derby–Shelton in 1925 when passenger service ended on the ex-Housatonic Railroad line through Shelton.

Service passed to Penn Central in 1969, Conrail in 1976, and finally Metro-North in 1983. The station building was repurposed for commercial use, but the last tenant left in 2015.

=== Reconstruction ===
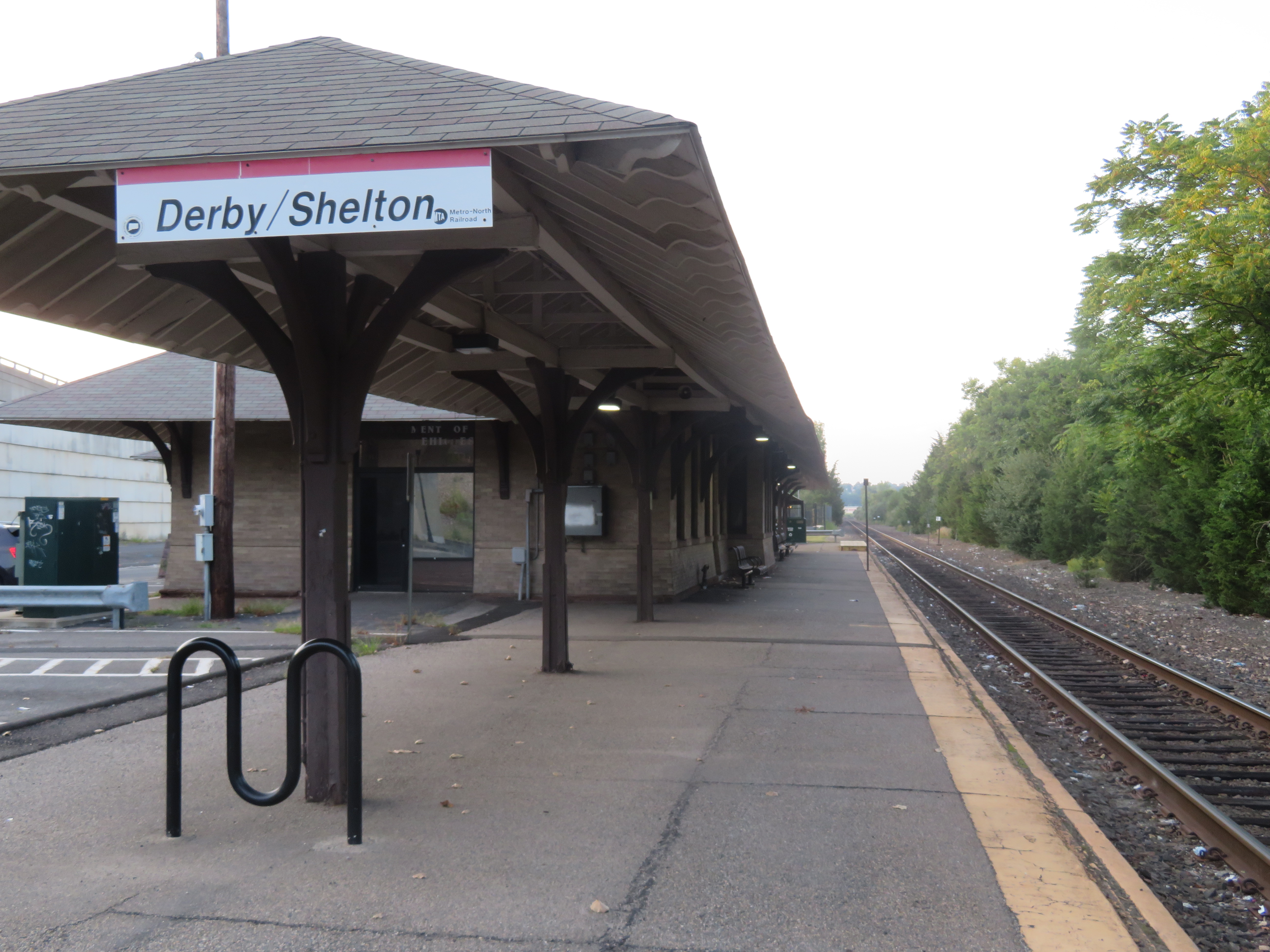
The non-accessible platform in 2018

In November 2021, Governor Ned Lamont indicated plans to reconstruct the five non-accessible Waterbury Branch stations, including Derby–Shelton. That month, the state received $12.6 million in federal funds to reconstruct the station for accessibility. The state approved $12 million in matching funds in December 2021. By late 2024, construction was to take place from 2025 to 2027 at a cost of $32 million.

Construction began in May 2026; the new platform is expected to be open in November 2027, with the $39.8 million project fully complete in May 2028. The platform will be 350 feet (110 m) long with a canopy over its full length. The interior of the station building will be renovated for use as a passenger waiting area and possible retail space. Two bus bays for CTtransit New Haven and Greater Bridgeport Transit buses will be added. Buses will replace rail service from July 20, 2026, to May 31, 2027, to allow construction at Derby–Shelton and other stations to take place.
