= Brookville BL20GH =

Diesel-electric locomotive

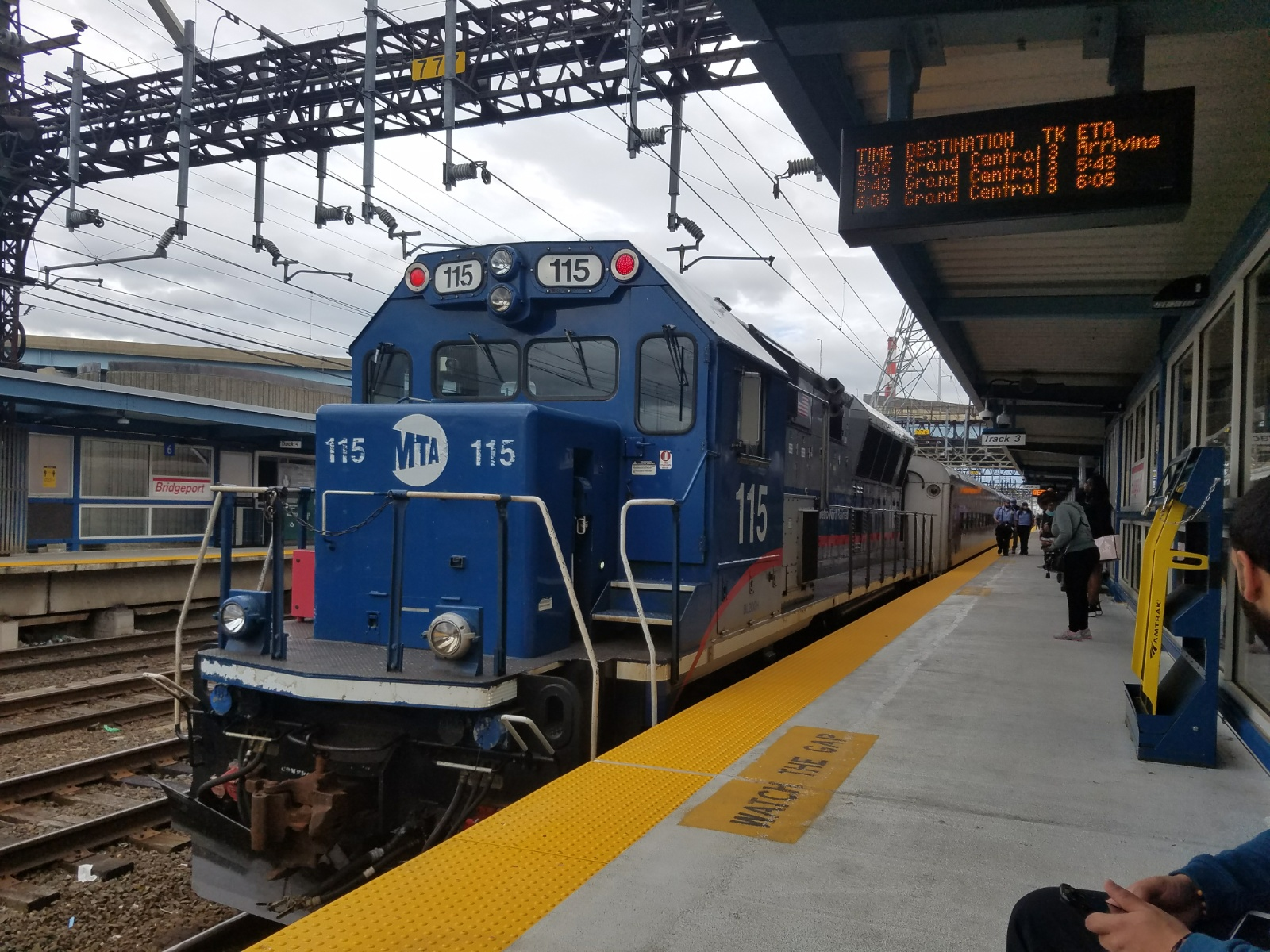
- Metro North BL20GH #115 stopped at Bridgeport
Type and origin
- Power type: Diesel
- Builder: Brookville Equipment Corporation
- Model: BL20GH
- Build date: January 2008; 18 years ago
- Total produced: 12 (plus 4 BL20G)
- Rebuilder: MotivePower
- Rebuild date: 2019-present
Specifications
- Configuration
  - AAR: B-B
  - UIC: Bo'Bo'
  - Commonwealth: Bo-Bo
- Gauge: 4 ft 8 1/2 in (1,435 mm) standard gauge
- Trucks: Blomberg B 4-Wheel
- Wheel diameter: 40 in (1,000 mm)
- Minimum curve: 30°
- Wheelbase: 43 ft 0 in (13,110 mm)
- Length: 59 ft 2 in (18,030 mm)
- Width: 10 ft 4 in (3,150 mm)
- Height: 15 ft 4.5 in (4,686 mm)
- Loco weight: 132 short tons (118 long tons; 120 t)
- Fuel capacity: 2,600 US gal (9,800 L; 2,200 imp gal)
- Lubricant cap.: 243 US gal (920 L; 202 imp gal)
- Coolant cap.: 240 US gal (910 L; 200 imp gal)
- Sandbox cap.: 56 ft^{3} (1.6 m^{3})
- Prime mover: MTU-Detroit Diesel 12V4000 (original); Cummins QSK50 (rebuilt)
- RPM
  - RPM idle: 1500
  - Maximum RPM: 2100
- Engine type: V12 diesel
- Alternator: GM GMD14
- Generator: Main: KATO 350; Auxilary: GM GMD14
- Traction motors: GM D78 (4)
- Cylinders: 12
- Cylinder size: 165 mm (6.5 in) × 190 mm (7.5 in)
- Gear ratio: 62:15
- MU working: Yes
- Train brakes: Westinghouse 26L (Air Brake)
Performance figures
- Maximum speed: 75 mph (121 km/h)
- Power output: 2,250 hp (1,680 kW)
- Tractive effort
  - Starting: 78,500 lbf (35,600 kgf; 349,000 N) @ 20%
  - Continuous: 54,700 lbf (24,800 kgf; 243,000 N) @ 12.5 mph (20.1 km/h)
Career
- Operators: Metro-North Railroad
- Numbers: 110–115 (MNRR); 125–130 (CDOT)
- First run: June 9, 2008; 18 years ago

The Brookville BL20GH is a diesel-electric locomotive built by the Brookville Equipment Corporation. The locomotive is designed for both freight and passenger service. Brookville built 12 in 2008 for the Metro-North Railroad. The Staten Island Railway operates four nearly identical BL20G locomotives, built by Brookville in December 2008, in work service.

== Design ==
The BL20GH is a low emissions locomotive. Originally equipped with a V12 MTU-Detroit Diesel 12V4000 engine rated at 2,250 horsepower (1,680 kW), rebuilt units now feature a Cummins QSK50 prime mover rated at 2,130 horsepower (1,590 kW). It has a separate Caterpillar engine for head end power, allowing the locomotive to be used in passenger service for branch line shuttle trains. The Metro-North locomotives are equipped with Automatic train control (ATC).

=== BL20G ===
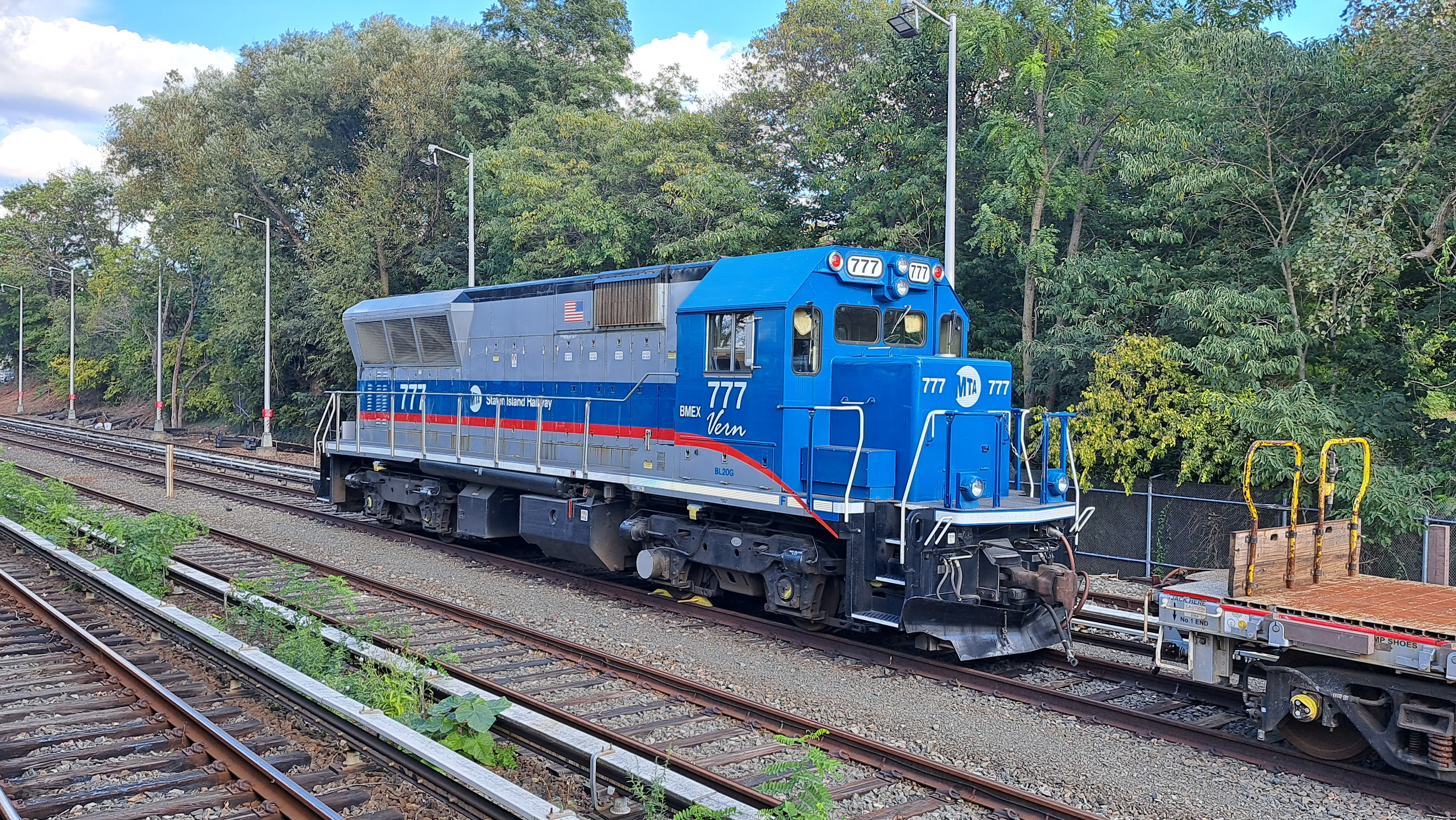
Staten Island Railway BL20G #777 at Tottenville station

The BL20G is a nearly identical locomotive that operates on the Staten Island Railway. Four were built by Brookville Corporation in December 2008. Numbered 776–779, these locomotives lack the head-end power generator and the associated ventilation grates of the BL20GH, and thus they are only used in work train service unless performing a rescue of their R44 and R211S EMU's.

== History ==
BL20GH of CTDOT, painted in the CT Rail livery.

Brookville built a single demonstrator for the Connecticut Department of Transportation (CTDOT); CTDOT and the Metro-North combined to order eleven more in 2008, for a total of twelve locomotives. CTDOT owns six of the locomotives, which it originally painted in its "McGinnis" paint scheme, named after former New York, New Haven and Hartford Railroad president Patrick B. McGinnis. This scheme consisted of a black nose, with a white stripe and an orange rear, with white New-Haven lettering overlapping the orange rear. The first public run of the BL20GH occurred on June 9, 2008.

These locomotives are used in branch service on the Metro-North Railroad, including the Danbury Branch and Waterbury Branch. They are used on shuttle trains operating on routes where there is no third rail (such as the Upper Harlem Line, between Southeast and Wassaic stations.) They lack third-rail shoes and thus rarely operate into Grand Central Terminal.

The BL20GH locomotives began a rebuild program by MotivePower in 2019. The rebuilt units, designated as BL20GHM, are equipped with Cummins QSK50 prime movers, which are compliant with Tier 3 of the Environmental Protection Agency's standards for locomotive emissions. All units owned by CTDOT were repainted into a paint scheme similar to the ones used on its CT Rail services.
