= Waterbury Branch =

Metro-North Railroad branch in Connecticut

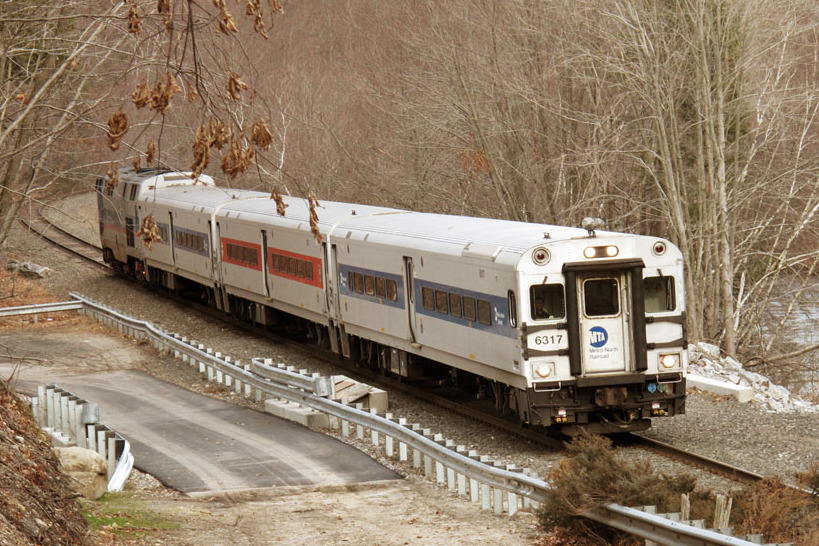
- A Waterbury Branch train near Naugatuck in 2012

Overview
- Status: Temporarily replaced with bus service
- Owner: ConnDOT
- Locale: Naugatuck River Valley, Connecticut, US
- Termini: Bridgeport; Waterbury
- Stations: 8

Service
- Type: Commuter rail
- System: Metro-North Railroad
- Operator: Metro-North Railroad
- Rolling stock: GE Genesis P32AC-DM; Brookville BL20GH; EMD GP40-3H; Shoreliner coaches

History
- Opened: 1849

Technical
- Number of tracks: 1
- Character: Single track, diesel motive power
- Track gauge: 4 ft 8 1/2 in (1,435 mm) standard gauge
Route map
Waterbury Branch highlighted in red (full weekday route)
- Distances shown from Grand Central Terminal

The Waterbury Branch is a commuter rail line operated by Metro-North Railroad in the Naugatuck Valley of western Connecticut, United States. The rail line runs north-south between Milford and Waterbury. Service operates between Bridgeport and Waterbury including a portion on the New Haven Line mainline. Of the six stations on the branch line, only the Waterbury terminal is accessible; renovations at the other stations are underway. Rail service on the line is replaced by buses from July 20, 2026, to May 31, 2027, during construction.

The line originated as the Naugatuck Railroad, which opened between Milford and Winsted in 1849 and became part of the New York, New Haven and Hartford Railroad in 1887. Passenger service north of Waterbury ended in 1958. The line passed to Penn Central in 1969, Conrail in 1976, and finally Metro-North in 1983. Service levels have been increased under Metro-North.

== History ==
=== Private operators ===
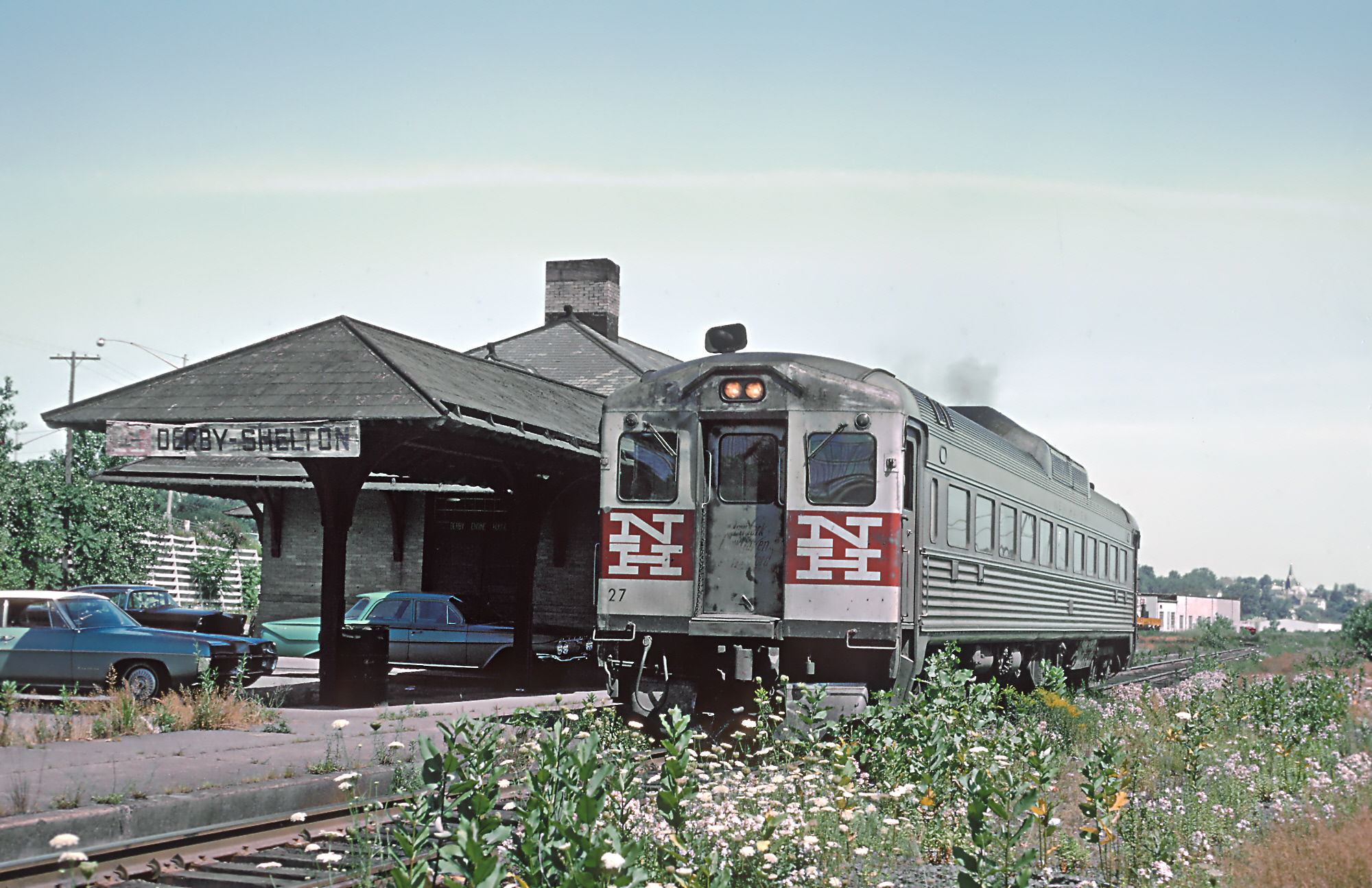
A New Haven Railroad train at Derby–Shelton in 1968

The Naugatuck Railroad began construction north from the New York and New Haven Railroad (NY&NH) at Naugatuck Junction (Devon) in Milford in April 1848. It opened in phases in 1849: to Seymour in May, to Waterbury in June, and to Winsted in September. Service operated between Naugatuck Junction and Bridgeport via trackage rights on the NY&NH; Bridgeport has remained the southern terminal of service on the branch since.

The New York, New Haven and Hartford Railroad, successor of the NY&NH, leased the Naugatuck Railroad in 1887. The New Haven relocated the portion through Derby in 1903–1904, partially using the alignment of the New Haven and Derby Railroad. Work on double-tracking the branch between Seymour and Waterbury was underway by 1906 and completed in 1907.

The New Haven ended passenger service north of Waterbury in 1958; the line was abandoned entirely north of Torrington in 1963. The New Haven merged into Penn Central in 1969; Penn Central became Conrail in 1976. Service was down to four daily round trips in the 1970s. The publicly-funded Metro-North Railroad took over remaining commuter operations in the state, including the Waterbury Branch, in 1983. Metro-North increased service to six daily round trips in the 1990s. A new Naugatuck Railroad associated with the Railroad Museum of New England began operating excursion service north of Waterbury.

=== Metro-North Railroad ===
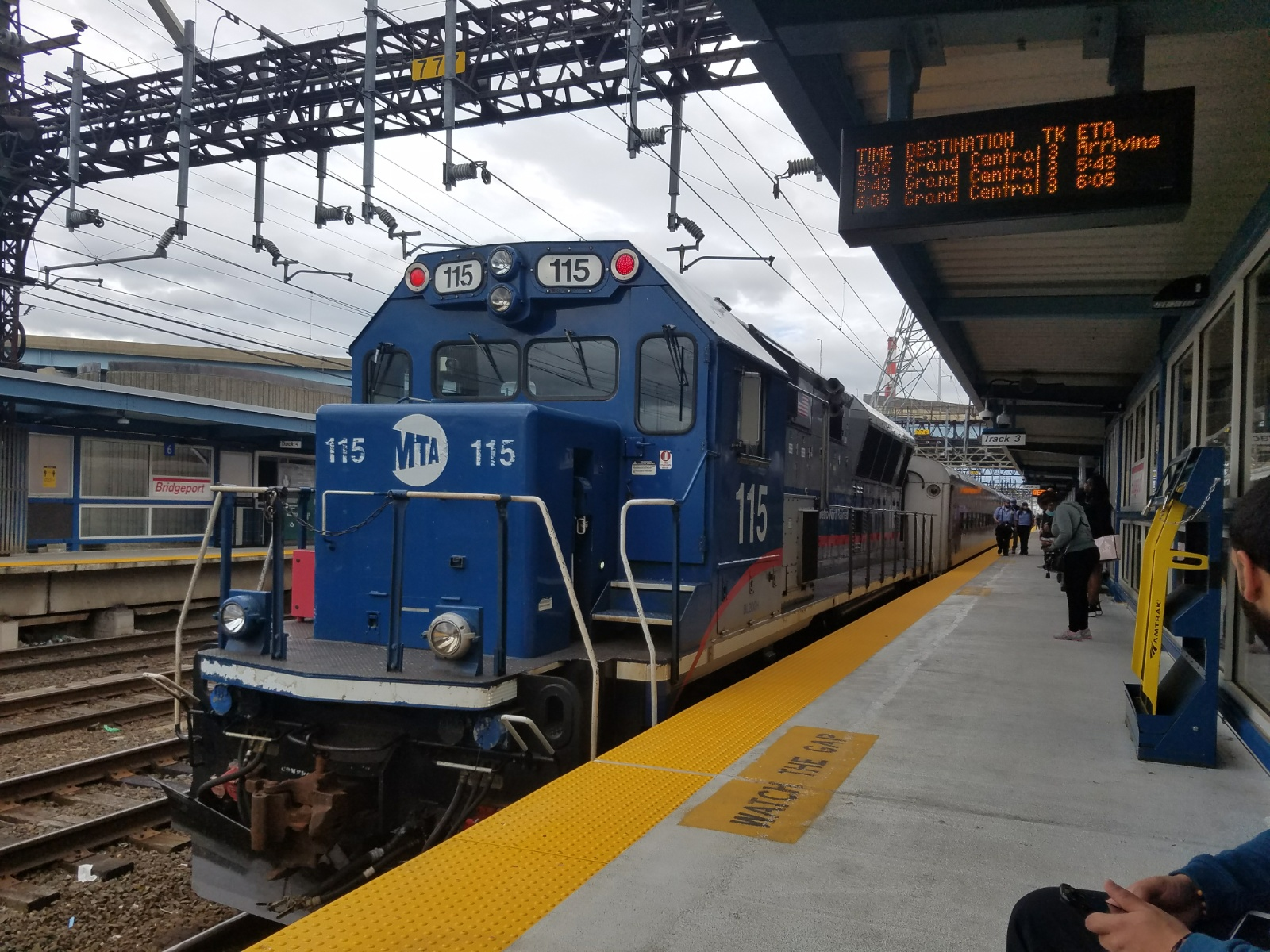
A Waterbury Branch train at Bridgeport in 2022

In September 2015, it was announced that out of governor Dannel Malloy's 30-year-$100 billion transportation plan, $350 million was included to improve service along the branch. The upgrades were to include a new signal system with multiple passing sidings to increase service – as it was the last remaining dark territory of the Metro-North system – along with newer equipment and station rehabilitation. Signalization enabled multiple trains to safely operate on the branch at a time, while allowing for increased capacity and overall safer train operation. New passing sidings were constructed at Derby and Beacon Falls, while existing sidings at Devon and Waterbury were upgraded, allowing trains to pass each other in single-track territory and thereby increase service frequency. Centralized Traffic Control was activated on November 7, 2021. Taking advantage of the newly constructed signal system, an increase in service frequency from 15 to 22 trains per day (12 southbound, 10 northbound) was implemented on July 10, 2022.

In 2022, the Connecticut Department of Transportation studied the feasibility of electrifying the Waterbury Branch. Major damage from catastrophic flooding washed out the line in several locations on August 18, 2024. All service was suspended in favor of replacement bus service while repairs took place. Service was restored on October 28, 2024.

Prior to the 2020s, Waterbury was the only accessible station on the branch. In November 2021, Governor Ned Lamont indicated plans to reconstruct the five non-accessible Waterbury Branch stations. By November 2024, the state planned to add accessible high-level platforms from 2025 to 2027. Groundbreaking for a relocated Naugatuck station took place in July 2025, with completion expected in mid-2027. Replacement of the existing Waterbury platform with a longer platform, along with the addition of a waiting room in the historic station building, began in October 2025 with completion expected in 2028. Construction on the remaining four stations began in May 2026 with completion expected in 2028. Buses will replace rail service from July 20, 2026, to May 31, 2027, to allow construction to take place.

== Stations ==
Fare zone	Location	Station	Miles (km) from GCT	Connections
51	Waterbury	Waterbury	87.5 (140.8)	CTfastrak; CTtransit Waterbury
51	Naugatuck	Naugatuck	82.5 (132.8)	CTtransit Waterbury
51	Beacon Falls	Beacon Falls	78.5 (126.3)	
51	Seymour	Seymour	75.0 (120.7)	CTtransit New Haven
51	Ansonia	Ansonia	71.1 (114.4)	CTtransit New Haven
51	Derby	Derby–Shelton	69.5 (111.8)	GBT, CTtransit New Haven
20	Stratford	Stratford	59.0 (95.0)	Metro-North Railroad: ■ New Haven Line; CT Rail: Shore Line East (limited service); GBT
19	Bridgeport	Bridgeport	55.4 (89.2)	Amtrak: Northeast Regional, Vermonter; Metro-North Railroad: ■ New Haven Line; CT Rail: Shore Line East (limited service); GBT, Sacred Heart University Transit Shuttle, University of Bridgeport shuttle Intercity bus: Greyhound, Peter Pan; Bridgeport & Port Jefferson Ferry

== Rolling stock ==
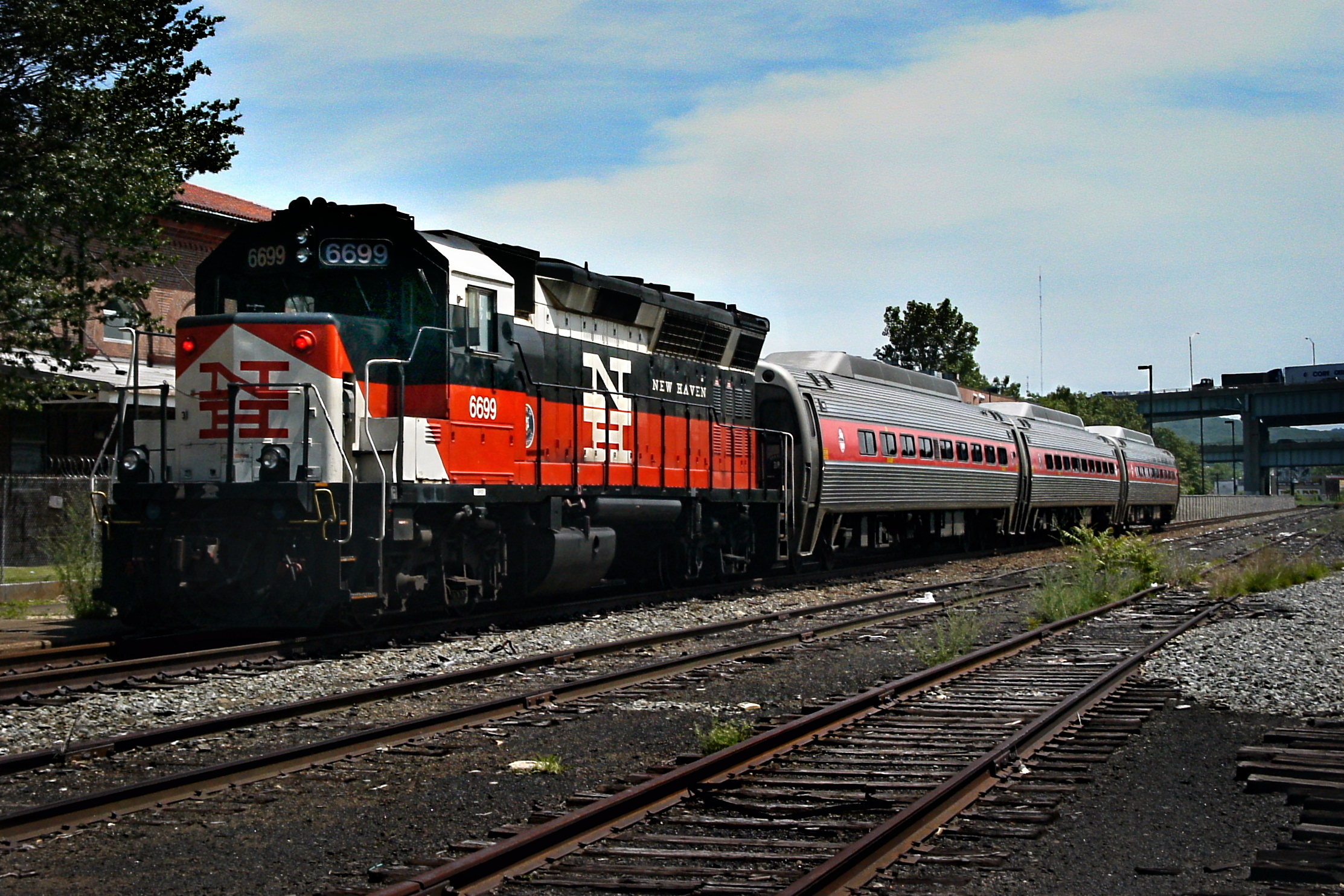
Waterbury Branch train with depowered SPV-2000 coaches at Waterbury in 2003

The Waterbury Branch uses Brookville BL20GH, GE Genesis P32AC-DM, and EMD GP40-3H locomotives and Shoreliner passenger coaches. Prior to the arrival of push-pull coaches, the branch used self-propelled Budd RDC and SPV-2000 railcars, the latter of which were later converted to coaches. A typical shuttle consists of three cars.

In August 2023, CTDOT approved a contract with Alstom for 60 single-level passenger cars. The cars will replace the existing Shoreliner coach fleet on the Waterbury Branch and the Danbury Branch, as well as Mafersa coaches on the Hartford Line. Deliveries are expected to begin in 2026.
