= Home Woolen Company =

- U.S. National Register of Historic Places
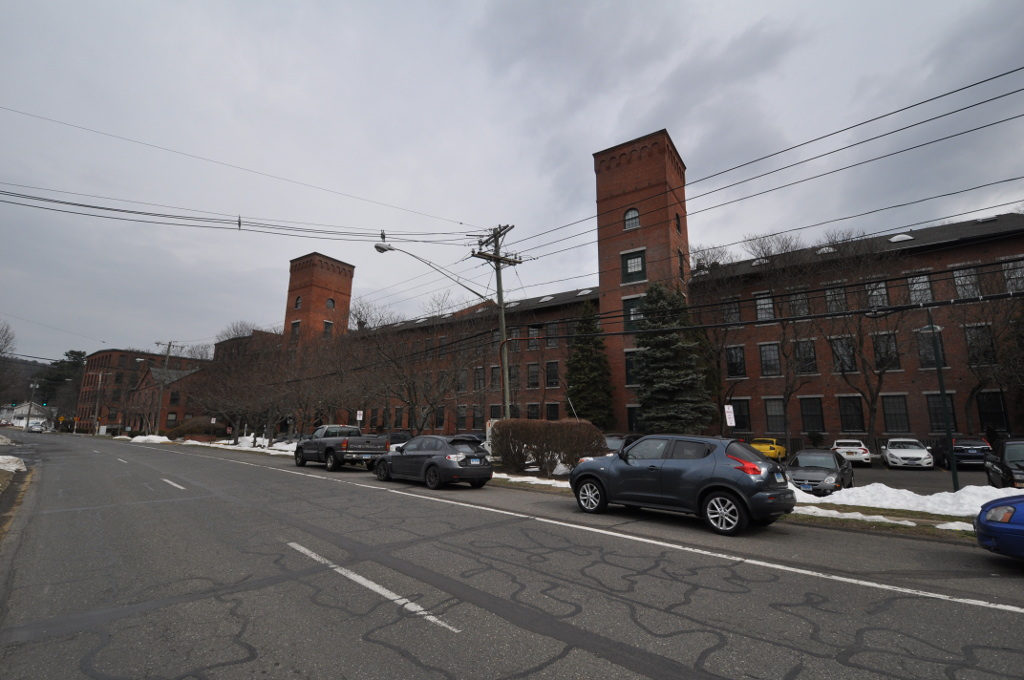

- Location within Connecticut Location within the United States
- Location: 2 North Main Street, Beacon Falls, Connecticut
- Coordinates: 41.44275°N 73.06175°W
- Area: 8 acres (3.2 ha)
- Built: 1853
- NRHP reference No.: 84000410
- Added to NRHP: November 29, 1984

The Home Woolen Company is a historic textile mill complex at 2 North Main Street in Beacon Falls, Connecticut. Developed between 1853 and 1916, the complex housed major local employers, engaged first in the manufacture of woolens and rubber products. The complex has been converted to residential use. It was listed on the National Register of Historic Places in 1984.

== Description and history ==
The former Home Woolen Company complex extends along the East Side of North Main Street (formerly Connecticut Route 8) at the Southern end of the modest commercial center of the village. The complex occupies 8 acres (3.2 ha), and includes about 25 buildings, a combination of joined and disconnected structures built mostly out of brick. Its most prominent features are the long three-story facade facing North Main Street, which is punctuated by a pair of five-story stair- and clock-towers. The styling is basically Italianate, with rectangular window openings, and corbelled brickwork on the towers.

The industrial development of Beacon Falls was spurred by the completion of a railroad line along the Naugatuck River in 1849. The core of this complex was built in 1853 by the American Hard Rubber Company, a licensee of Charles Goodyear's rubber vulcanizing process. That company operated here until 1858, producing, buttons, flasks, materials for use in shoe and garment manufacturing, and possibly also industrial machinery belts. The complex, which included a dam on the river and a diversion canal (both no longer surviving) was purchased by the Home Woolen Company in 1868. The company greatly expanded the plant, but suffered from Southern competition and closed permanently (after several temporary closures) in 1887. The next major tenant was the Beacon Falls Rubber Shoe Company, which operated here between 1898 and 1930, producing shoes and rubberized garments. The complex has since been converted to residential use.

== See also ==
- National Register of Historic Places listings in New Haven County, Connecticut
