= Naugatuck Railroad =

Shortline Railroad operated by Railroad Museum

- Maximum extent of the Naugatuck Railroad

Overview
- Headquarters: Thomaston, Connecticut
- Reporting mark: NAUG
- Locale: Litchfield County, Connecticut, Naugatuck Valley
- Dates of operation: 1996–present
- Predecessor: New York, New Haven and Hartford Railroad

Technical
- Track gauge: 1,435 mm (4 ft 8 1/2 in) standard gauge
- Length: 19.6 miles (31.5 km)

Other
- Website: http://www.naugfreight.com

The Naugatuck Railroad (reporting mark NAUG) is a common carrier railroad owned by the Railroad Museum of New England and operated on tracks leased from the Connecticut Department of Transportation. The original Naugatuck Railroad was a railroad chartered to operate through south central Connecticut in 1845, with the first section opening for service in 1849. In 1887 the line was leased by the New York, New Haven and Hartford Railroad, and became wholly owned by 1906. At its greatest extent the Naugatuck ran from Bridgeport north to Winsted. Today's Naugatuck Railroad, formed in 1996, runs from Waterbury to the end of track in Torrington, Connecticut. From Waterbury south to the New Haven Line, Metro-North Railroad operates commuter service on the Waterbury Branch.

== History ==
=== Original Naugatuck Railroad (1845–1887) ===
The Naugatuck Railroad was chartered May 1845 and organized February 1848. On May 15, 1849, the first section opened, from a junction with the just-completed New York and New Haven Railroad north to Seymour. Extensions opened to Waterbury June 11 and the rest of the way to Winsted September 24, where the Central New England Railway later passed through. On November 1, 1870 the Naugatuck Railroad leased the Watertown and Waterville Railroad, giving it a branch to Waterville. The New York, New Haven and Hartford Railroad leased the Naugatuck on May 24, 1887, and merged it January 31, 1906.

=== New Haven era (1887–1969) ===
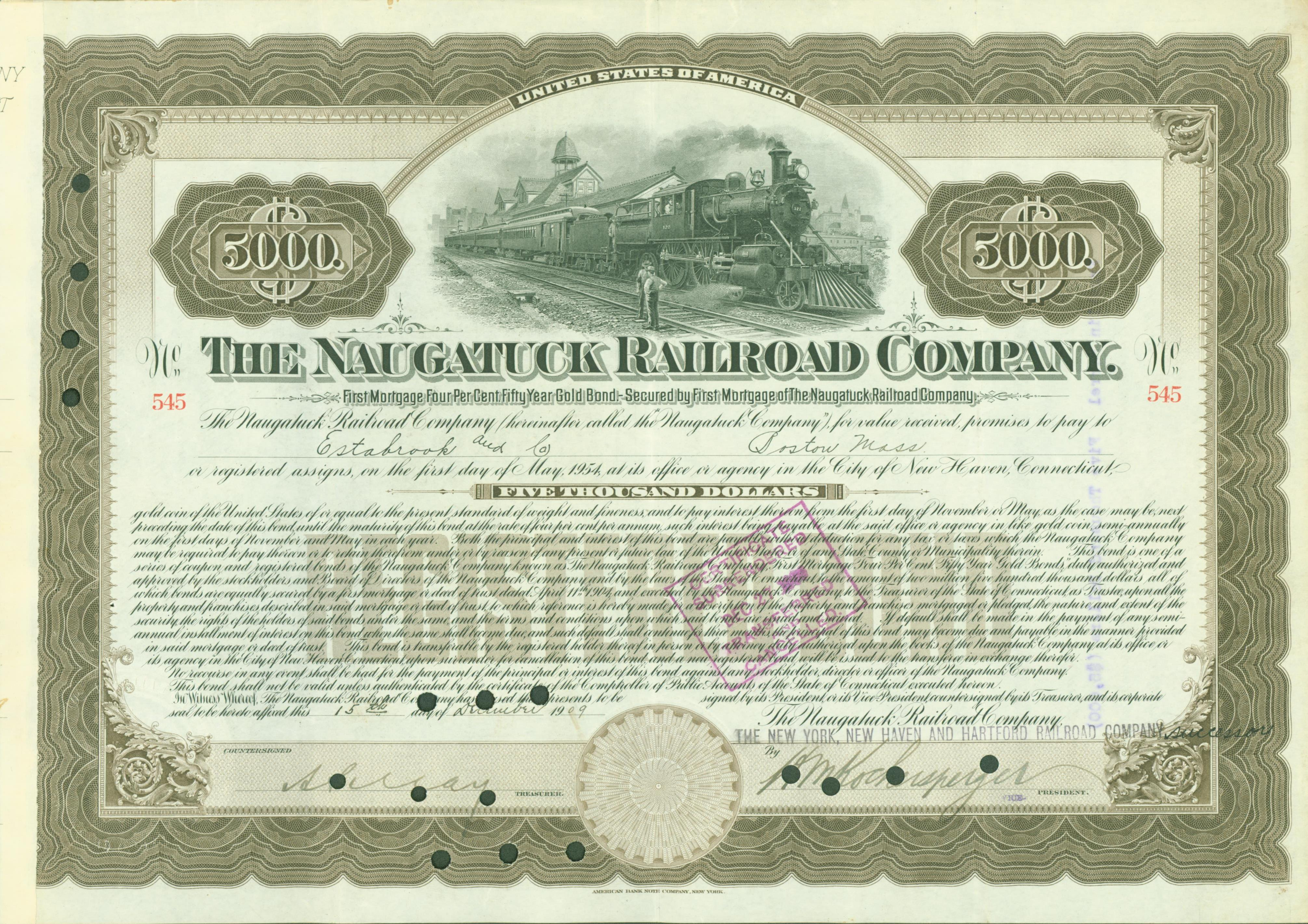
Gold bond of the Naugatuck Railroad Company, issued December 1909

The former Naugatuck Railroad became part of the New Haven's network of branch lines extending throughout the state. In the mid-to-late 1900s, the line was abandoned from Derby Junction north to Ansonia in favor of the original New Haven and Derby Railroad on the other (west) side of the Naugatuck River.

In 1938, the New Haven abandoned the former Central New England Railway route that connected at Winsted. Passenger service north of Waterbury, to Torrington and Winsted, ended in December 1958. The Thomaston Dam flood control project constructed by the Army Corps of Engineers required roughly 8 miles (13 km) of track to be relocated between 1959 and 1960. The new construction begins just north of Thomaston station and returns to the original alignment near East Litchfield. Tracks between Torrington and Winsted were abandoned in 1963.

=== Post-New Haven era (1969–1995) ===
The New Haven was merged into Penn Central on January 1, 1969. By then the line north of Waterbury was named the Torrington Secondary Track, and ended at Torrington. On January 1, 1971, the State of Connecticut and the MTA leased passenger and freight operations along the Waterbury Branch to Penn Central. On April 1, 1976, Penn Central's railroad operations were conveyed to Conrail. Freight traffic continued to decline through the 1970s as many of the factories along the line that shipped by rail closed and relocated out of the region. Starting in 1983, commuter service between Bridgeport and Waterbury was operated by Metro-North Railroad as the Waterbury Branch.

ConnDOT purchased the line between Devon and Torrington in 1982 from Conrail to preserve its use as a rail corridor. The line north of Waterbury was leased to the Boston and Maine Corporation in 1982. Freight service was operated as-needed, and continued to decline. With no freight customers left to serve, B&M discontinued operations north of Waterbury in 1995.

=== The new Naugatuck Railroad (1996–present) ===
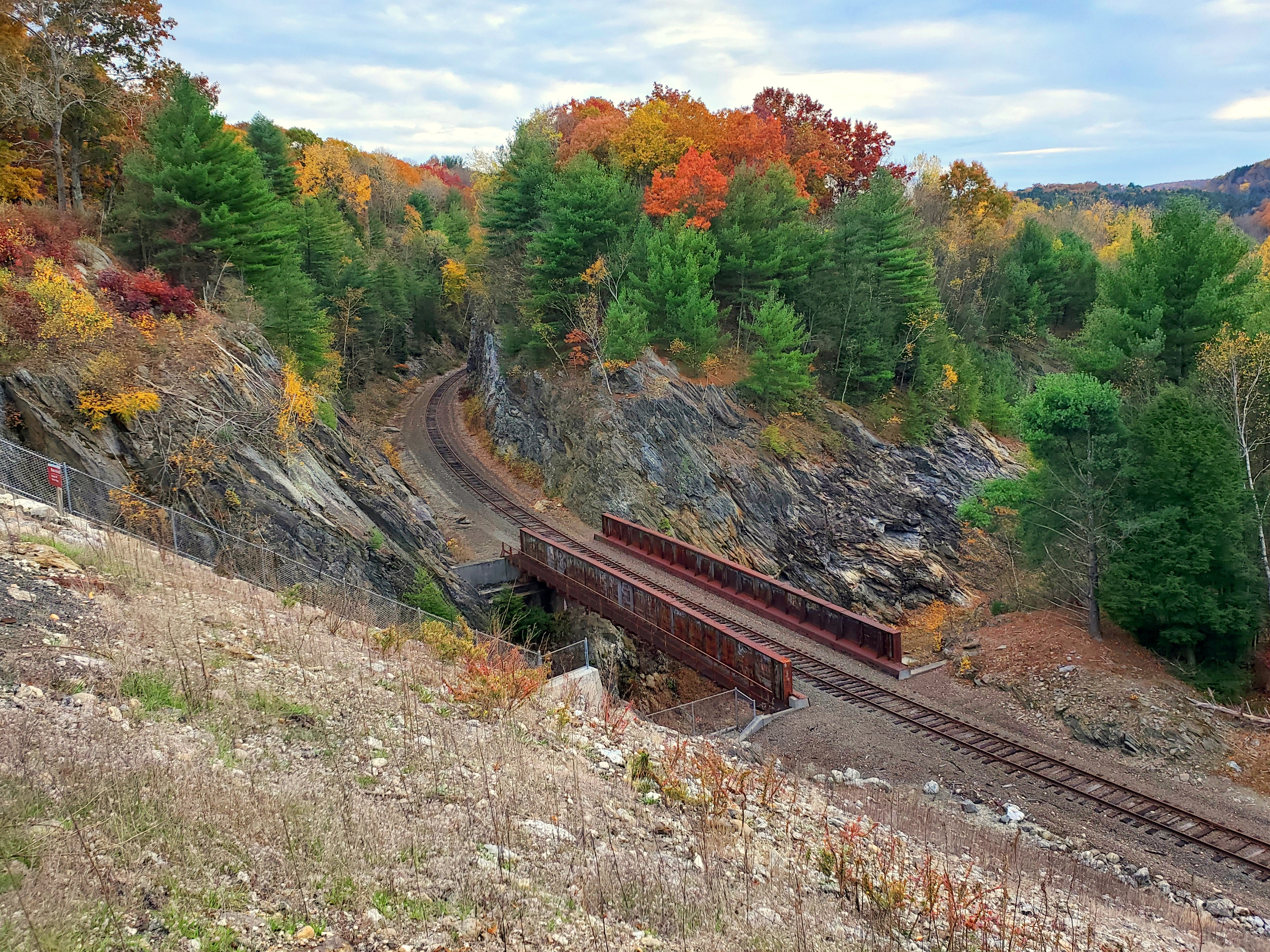
The bridge over the Thomaston Dam spillway

The volunteers of the Railroad Museum of New England were looking for a new home for their collection of historic railroad equipment that was housed at the Valley Railroad in Essex, Connecticut. Several locations were considered in the 1990s, including the abandoned freight yard and station complex in Danbury, Connecticut, and the former roundhouse and yard site in Willimantic, Connecticut. While railroads museums would later be established at those sites, RMNE continued its search for a rail line they could operate their own excursions.

When Boston & Maine ended operations on the Torrington Secondary, ConnDOT made the line available to RMNE's Naugatuck Railroad subsidiary. ConnDOT leased the line from Waterbury to Torrington to the new Naugatuck Railroad (NAUG). NAUG started operations in September 1996. Owned by the RMNE as a common carrier, the NAUG provides regular seasonal passenger excursions between Thomaston, Waterville, and Thomaston Dam, with occasional trips to Torrington. Freight service is operated twice weekly, interchanging with Berkshire & Eastern at Highland Jct. The primary freight customer is located at Frost Bridge Road in Watertown. Other freight services are provided at East Litchfield and Torrington. While NAUG's operating limit begins nearby Metro-North Railroad's Waterbury station, no coordinated connecting passenger service is available.

== See also ==
- List of heritage railroads in the United States
- List of New York, New Haven and Hartford Railroad precursors
