= Waterbury station (Metro-North) =

Metro-North Railroad station in Connecticut

Waterbury
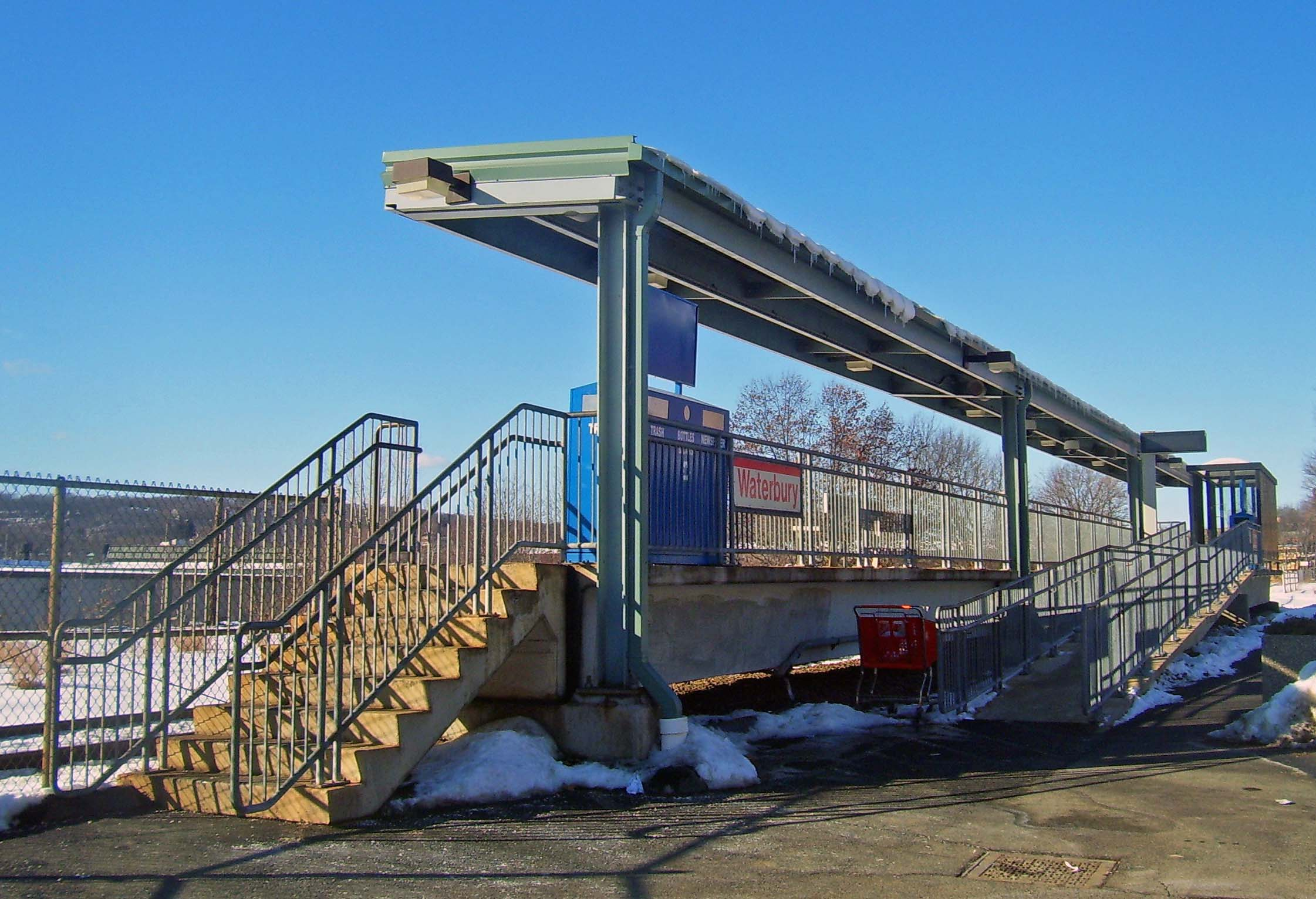
- The station platform in January 2009

General information
- Location: 333 Meadow Street; Waterbury, Connecticut
- Coordinates: 41.5544°N 73.0470°W
- Owner: ConnDOT
- Operator: ConnDOT and Metro-North Railroad
- Platforms: 1 side platform
- Tracks: 1
- Connections: CT Transit Waterbury: 229, 441, 450, 925, 928

Construction
- Parking: 156 spaces
- Accessible: Yes

Other information
- Fare zone: 51

Passengers
- 2018: 275 daily boardings

Services
Preceding station	Metro-North Railroad	Following station
Naugatuck toward Bridgeport	Waterbury Branch	Terminus
Preceding station	Heritage railroads	Following station
Terminus	Naugatuck Railroad Railroad Museum of New England	Waterville towards Bala (Penybont)
Location

Waterbury station is a commuter rail stop on the Waterbury Branch of the Metro-North Railroad's New Haven Line, located on Meadow Street in Waterbury, Connecticut. It is the northern terminus of the Waterbury Branch. Rail service on the line is replaced by buses from July 20, 2026, to May 31, 2027, during construction that includes a reconstruction of the Waterbury station platform.

Following its completion on March 28, 2015, improved express bus service began between Waterbury station to Hartford via the CTfastrak busway, servicing the communities of Southington and Cheshire using this partially grade-separated route.

== Station layout ==
The current station is a large platform near the old one, a 1909 brick edifice known for its distinctive clock tower and which is the focal point of Waterbury's skyline. The old station is now the offices of the Republican-American, Waterbury's daily newspaper. The modern station has one high-level side platform to the east of the tracks long enough for one and a half train cars to receive and discharge passengers. The platform has a roof that covers it. A Metro-North siding is located just south of the station. The siding was once track one, directly adjacent to the old station. A section of the track was removed, and the parking lot built in its place. There is also a small coach yard to the west of the station.

The station is owned and operated by the Connecticut Department of Transportation, but Metro-North is responsible for maintaining platform lighting as well as trash and snow removal. Parking is first-come, first-serve and operated by the city of Waterbury.

In November 2021, Governor Ned Lamont indicated plans to reconstruct the five non-accessible Waterbury Branch stations. By late 2024, the state also planned to replace the existing platform at Waterbury and add a waiting room in the station building. It was expected to cost $17 million for the platform and $3 million for the waiting room. Construction began in October 2025; the new platform is expected to be open in September 2027, with the project fully complete in May 2028. Expected cost is $27.7 million for the platform and $11.3 million for the waiting room. The platform will be 350 feet (110 m) long with a canopy over its full length. Buses will replace rail service from July 20, 2026, to May 31, 2027, to allow construction at the intermediate stations to take place.
