= Bridgeport station (Connecticut) =

Railroad station in Bridgeport, Connecticut, US

Bridgeport
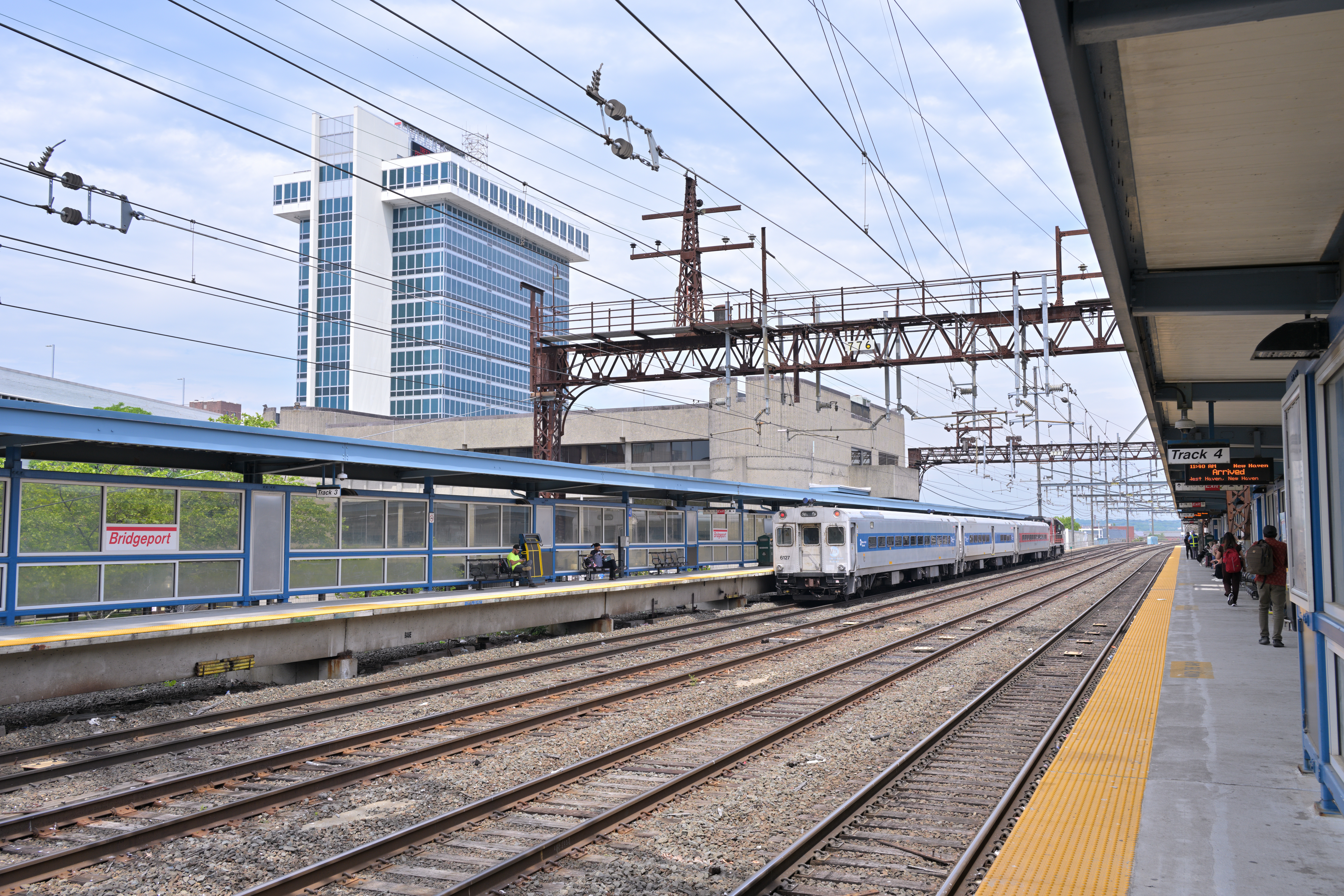
- Bridgeport station in 2026

General information
- Location: 525 Water Street; Bridgeport, Connecticut; United States
- Coordinates: 41.1778°N 73.1871°W
- Owner: City of Bridgeport
- Operator: Connecticut Department of Transportation
- Line: ConnDOT New Haven Line (Northeast Corridor)
- Platforms: 2 side platforms
- Tracks: 4
- Connections: Greater Bridgeport Transit Authority: 1, 3, 4, 5, 6, 7, 8, 9, 10, 13, 15, 17, 19X, 22X, 23, Coastal Link; Greyhound; Peter Pan; Bridgeport & Port Jefferson Ferry; Sacred Heart University Transit Shuttle; University of Bridgeport Shuttle

Construction
- Accessible: Yes

Other information
- Station code: Amtrak: BRP
- Fare zone: 19 (Metro-North)

History
- Opened: 1840 (Housatonic Railroad); January 1849 (New York, New Haven and Hartford Railroad
- Rebuilt: July 1903–August 20, 1905; June 7, 1973–October 27, 1975

Key dates
- March 20, 1979: 1905 station depot burns down

Passengers
- FY 2025: 141,023 annually (Amtrak)
- 2018: 4,490 daily boardings (Metro-North)

Services
Preceding station	Amtrak	Following station
Stamford toward Norfolk, Newport News or Roanoke	Northeast Regional	New Haven toward Boston South or Springfield
Stamford toward Washington, D.C.	Vermonter	New Haven toward St. Albans
Acela does not stop here
Preceding station	CT Rail	Following station
Stamford Terminus	Shore Line East limited weekday service	Stratford toward New London
Preceding station	Metro-North Railroad	Following station
Fairfield–Black Rock toward Grand Central	New Haven Line	Stratford toward New Haven or New Haven State Street
Terminus	Waterbury Branch	Stratford weekday service toward Waterbury
Terminus	Waterbury Branch	Derby–Shelton toward Waterbury
Former services
Preceding station	Amtrak	Following station
Stamford toward Washington, D.C.	Montrealer	New Haven toward Montreal
Preceding station	New York, New Haven and Hartford Railroad	Following station
Fairfield toward New York	Main Line	Stratford toward New Haven
Location

Bridgeport station is a shared Amtrak and Metro-North Railroad train station along the Northeast Corridor serving Bridgeport, Connecticut and nearby towns. On Metro-North, the station is the transfer point between the Waterbury Branch and the main New Haven Line. Amtrak's inter-city Northeast Regional and Vermonter service also stop at the station. In addition the transfer point for Greater Bridgeport Transit Authority buses, the departure point for the Bridgeport & Port Jefferson Ferry across Long Island Sound to Port Jefferson, New York, and both the Total Mortgage Arena and the Hartford Healthcare Amphitheater are located adjacent to the station.

== History ==
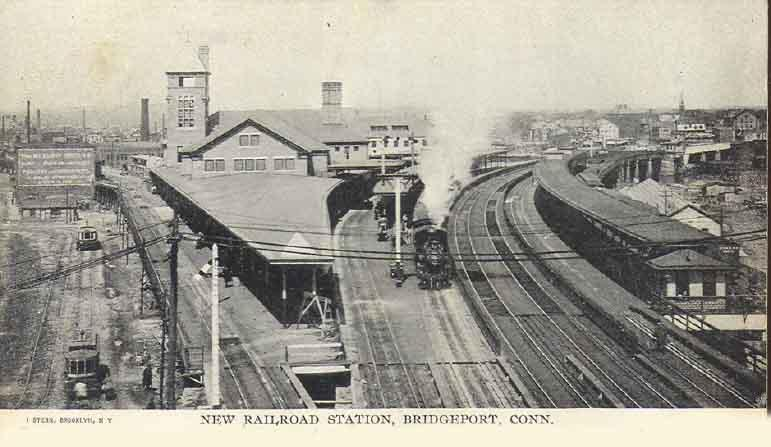
The 1905-built Bridgeport station in 1907

The current station was built under ConnDOT and Penn Central in 1975. It replaced a large, ornate structure built in 1905, located to the north of the current station at 41.181206°N 73.187535°W. A branch line, originally built by New Haven Railroad predecessor Housatonic Railroad to Trumbull, Monroe and Newtown, used to join the main tracks at the old Bridgeport station. The relocation was occasioned by the introduction of "Cosmopolitan" M-2 railcars which could only board at high-level platforms, the installation of which was impractical at the old station due to the curvature of the platforms. The old station was destroyed by fire on March 20, 1979.

On July 14, 1955, the northbound Federal Express overnight train from Washington, D.C. to Boston derailed due to excessive speed on a sharp curve approaching the station. One person was killed and 58 were injured.

The limited Shore Line East service west of New Haven was service suspended indefinitely on March 16, 2020, due to the coronavirus pandemic. That service resumed on October 7, 2024.

== Station layout ==
The station has two high-level side platforms, each eight cars long. The western platform, adjacent to Track 3, is generally used by westbound/southbound Metro-North and Amtrak trains. The eastern platform, adjacent to Track 4, is generally used by eastbound/northbound Metro-North and Amtrak trains. The New Haven Line uses four tracks at this location. The two inner tracks, not adjacent to either platform, are used only by express trains, including the Acela.

The station has 1,453 parking spaces, with 950 owned by the state.
