= Barnum station =

Proposed Metro-North Railroad station in Connecticut

Barnum
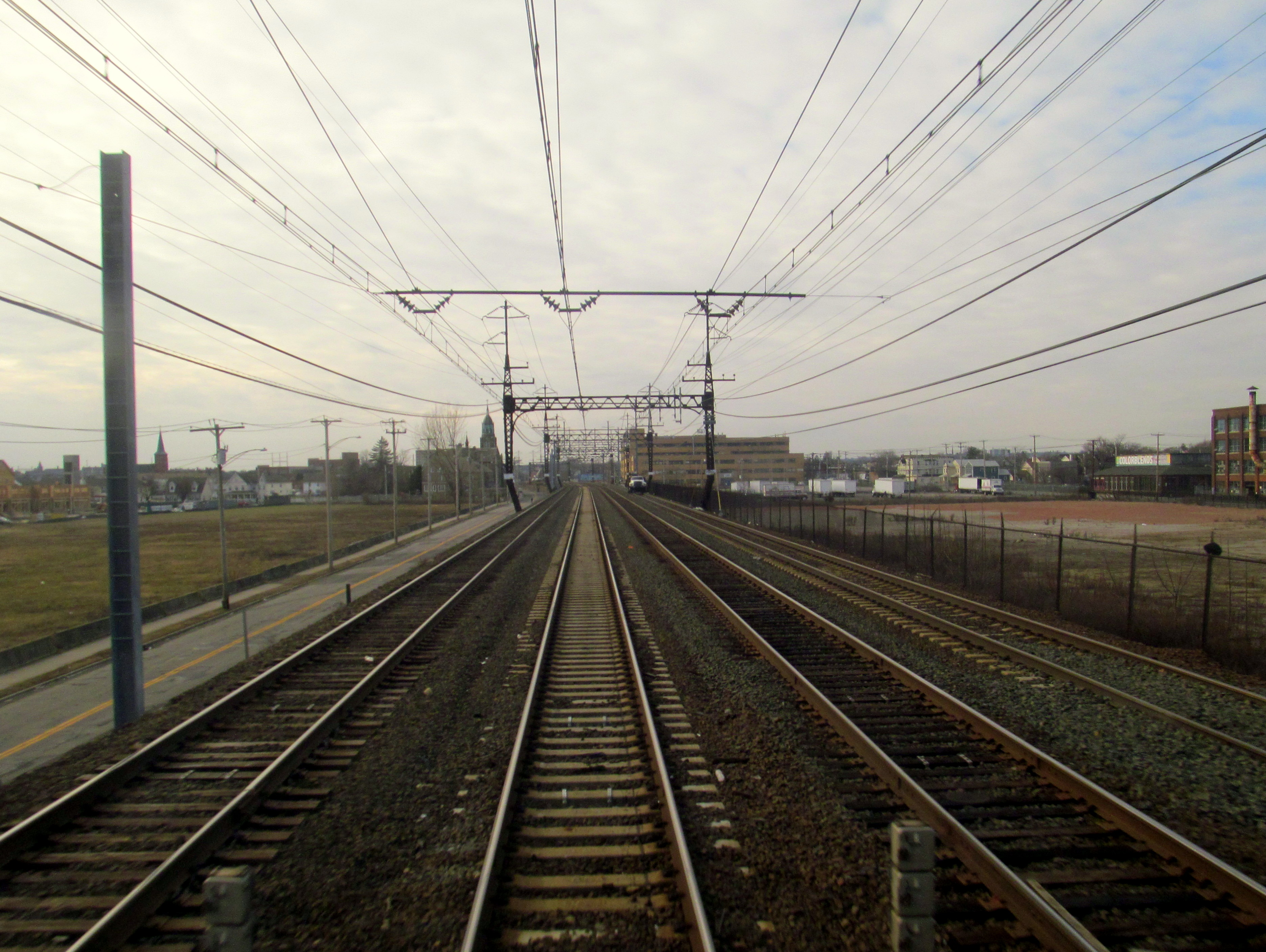
- Proposed station site in January 2016

General information
- Location: 812 Barnum Avenue; Bridgeport, Connecticut
- Coordinates: 41°11′09″N 73°10′25″W
- Owner: Metropolitan Transportation Authority
- Platforms: 2 island platforms
- Tracks: 4

Construction
- Parking: 550 spaces (planned)

History
- Electrified: 12,500V (AC) overhead catenary

Services
Preceding station	Metro-North Railroad	Following station
Bridgeport toward Grand Central	New Haven Line	Stratford toward New Haven or New Haven State Street
Location

Barnum station is a planned regional rail station to be located on the Metro-North Railroad's New Haven Line in East Bridgeport, Connecticut. The station will be named after the circus showman and former Bridgeport mayor P. T. Barnum, and will be located on the south side of Barnum Avenue between Seaview Avenue and Pembroke Street. A feasibility study was released in July 2013, followed by preliminary planning funding in July 2014 and an application for planning funding in June 2015. By January 2017, the station was planned to open in 2021. However, the project was indefinitely postponed in January 2019.

== Description ==
The station was estimated to cost $146.1 million to complete in 2017 and will have two offset 900-foot-long island platforms to allow Amtrak service to stop as well. The two local tracks will be shifted toward the outside of the right-of-way to provide space for the island platforms. The construction of the platforms and the shifting of the tracks will require widening the reconstruction of some bridges. The station will have 550 park and ride spots for commuters.

The station will enhance service flexibility by enabling express service, and permitting two-track local and two-track express service. Currently, along the New Haven, there are only two stations with island platforms, Stamford and New Haven. This layout requires that trains stopping at any other station has to switch to the outer local tracks, requiring lower operating speeds and reducing capacity. Since normal express service would be hard to operate, Metro-North has zone express service to reduce the number of crossovers used in revenue service. Some trains stop at a block of stations, and other trains stop at other blocks of stations. Current Amtrak trains stop at Bridgeport, and therefore, they have to cross to the outside tracks. The increased capacity could allow for increases in Metro-North and Shore Line East service.

The station will support future transit-oriented development (TOD) in the East Bridgeport area. Without the construction of the station, TOD would not be possible.

The station will have 550 parking spaces when it opens, with the possibility for an expansion to 1,000 spaces. There will either be a pedestrian overpass or a pedestrian concourse to connect the platforms.

== History ==
The New York and New Haven Railroad was completed through Bridgeport by 1849. Local and intercity service both used the main railroad station in downtown Bridgeport; no station served the East Side or East End neighborhoods across the Pequonnock River from downtown. In the early 2000s, the Connecticut Department of Transportation began adding infill stations to underserved areas along the line, which resulted in the opening of Fairfield Metro in 2011 and West Haven in 2013. Around 2010, the Greater Bridgeport planning Commission and the City of Bridgeport began studying the possibility of adding a second station in Bridgeport.

A feasibility study was released in July 2013 which analyzed the potential for a station sited at the former Remington Arms Company factory in East Bridgeport. It analyzed several different possible platform configurations with the possibility of adding Amtrak Northeast Regional intercity service in addition to Metro-North commuter rail service, and determined that all Metro-North trains operating local east of Bridgeport except for some that make quick reversals at New Haven would be able to stop without substantial operational issues. At the time of the report, the station was estimated to cost $48.0 million.

In July 2014, Connecticut Governor Dannel Malloy approved the project and authorized $2.75 million in bonds for preliminary planning, with the intention that the station would be open in late 2018. The bond funding was later increased to $7.4 million. In June 2015, CTDOT applied for $11.0 million in federal TIGER grants for station design. The agency then estimated that the environmental review, design, and construction would cost $146.1 million in total. The station's name comes from P. T. Barnum, the circus leader who later became a state senator and mayor of Bridgeport. The federal grant was rescinded at the end of 2016 because the state was unable to fund design and construction of the station.

On January 3, 2017, the Environmental Impact Evaluation for the station was published, and the opening date for the station was pushed back to 2021. In addition, the cost of the project ballooned to $275 to 300 million. In January 2018, the project was put on hold due to the lack of funds in Connecticut's Special Transit Fund. The cost of the project was initially projected to be $46 million, but increased due to demands to allow Amtrak to use the station. In January 2019, the state indefinitely postponed the project due to the significant cost increase.
