= Orange station (Metro-North) =

Metro-North Railroad station in Connecticut

Orange

General information
- Location: Marsh Hill Road; Orange, Connecticut
- Coordinates: 41.247139°N 72.997632°W
- Owner: Metropolitan Transportation Authority
- Line: New Haven Line
- Platforms: 2 side platforms
- Tracks: 4

History
- Opened: TBD
- Electrified: 12,500V (AC) overhead catenary

Services
| Preceding station | Metro-North Railroad | Following station |
|---|---|---|
| Milford toward Grand Central | New Haven Line proposed | West Haven toward New Haven or New Haven State Street |
Location

Orange station is a planned commuter rail stop that would serve the Metro-North Railroad's New Haven Line in Orange, Connecticut. The station will be located at Marsh Hill Road and a new access road. In early 2017, the station was planned to open in fall 2021, but budget difficulties at the end of the year canceled the plan for the time being.

== Description ==
The station is planned to be built on a 50-acre parcel in Orange through a public-private partnership. A private transit-oriented development project, which would include residential units, retail, and a parking garage, will be constructed in conjunction with the station. The station will have two canopied side platforms that will be located within the existing right-of-way. The station will be ADA-compliant and will have elevators.

The station, according to the Final Environment Impact Station from June 2007, which was considering both the station and a station at West Haven, would have 1080-foot-long platforms, a 470-space parking structure north of the southbound platform and a 3000-square-foot waiting room. This plan had a pedestrian tunnel connecting the two platforms, while existing plans have them connected by an overpass. The existing station location is primarily undeveloped.

== History ==
In the late 1990s, Metro-North began considering adding a station in either Orange or neighboring West Haven, Connecticut, to fill the ten-mile gap between the Milford and New Haven stations—the longest such gap on the New Haven mainline. Both town governments were supportive of a station, which was then to cost $25–30 million. Support in West Haven was largely rallied by the West Haven Train Station Committee Inc., which circulated a petition eventually signed by 7600 residents. Support in Orange was both local by the Orange Railroad Committee and also aided by several employers, including Bayer Pharmaceuticals, whose employees were likely to use the station. In fall 2001, a site study and a regional transportation committee recommended the Orange site (at Marsh Hill Road) based on cost, time considerations, and highway access. However, in December 2001, the South Central Council of Governments voted instead to support the West Haven site, citing the economic needs of West Haven versus comparatively wealthy Orange.

Orange's first selectman originally planned to appeal the decision, and controversy continued. The sustained bitter animosity between the two towns was cited in a study of bargaining between municipalities. The Final Environmental Impact Statement, issued in June 2007, considered both station sites, noting that "The recommendation of the West Haven site does not preclude the construction of a commuter railroad station at the Orange site in the future, as the demand for additional parking and service warrants, and as additional funding becomes available." In 2011–even after ground was broken at West Haven–state lawmakers considered a funding deal to build an Orange station. In July 2011, Governor Malloy signed a bill that sought a funding source, but that committed no funds to the project. The West Haven station opened on August 18, 2013. On February 1, 2017, the Connecticut State Bond Commission authorized $21 million for design work for the station, in addition to funding for the upgrade of a station on the Danbury Branch.

In November 2017, the Connecticut DOT announced that it would halt funding for the construction of Orange station and the accompanying transit-oriented development as the state was running out of funds for transportation projects.
