= National Helicopter Museum =

Coordinates: 41.19474°N 73.13050°W

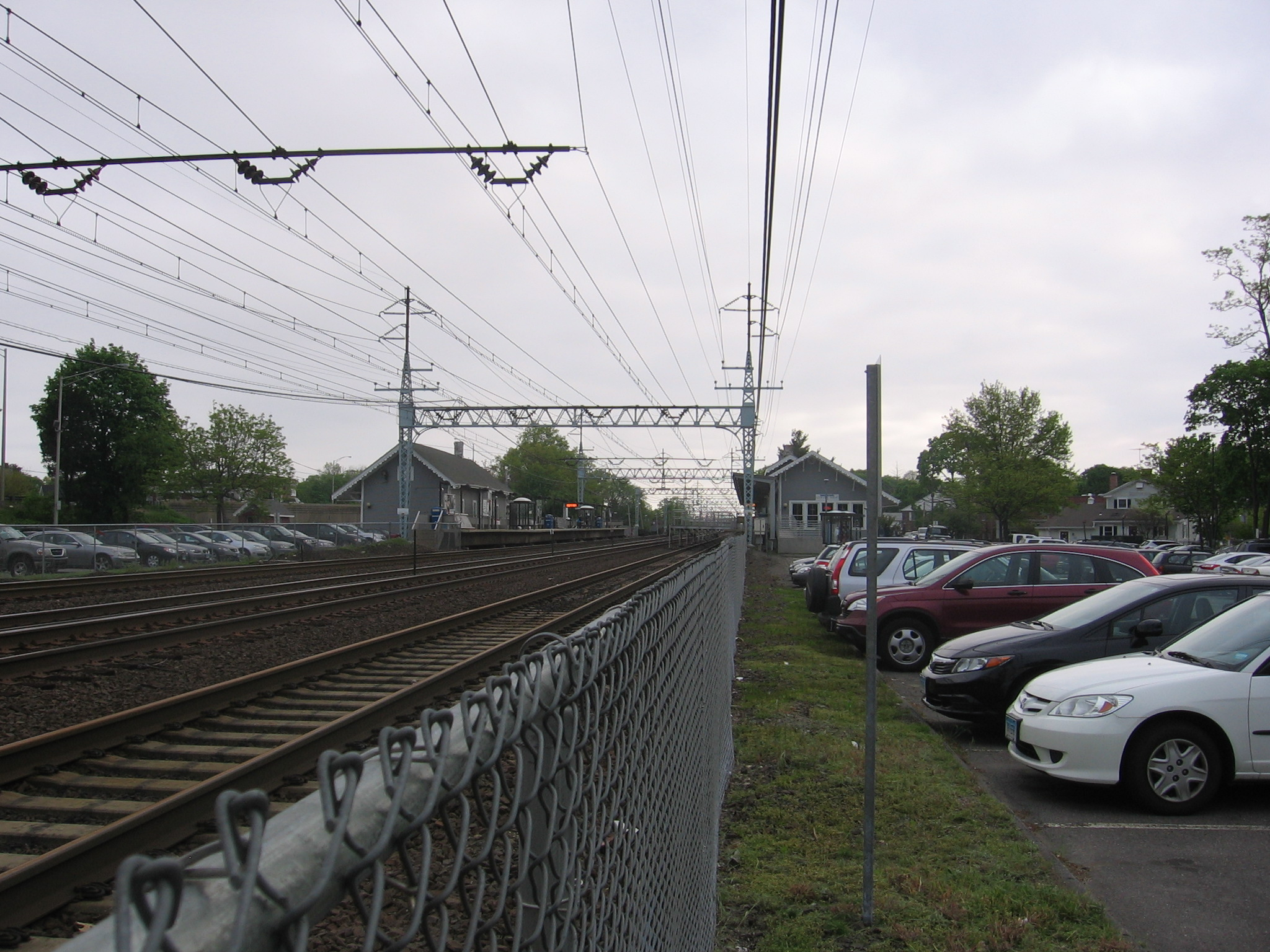
Stratford station, the Helicopter Museum is in the building on the left

The National Helicopter Museum is a non-profit museum focused on the history of the helicopter and aviation industry around Stratford, Connecticut in the United States.

The museum was founded in 1983 by Dr. Raymond Jankowich and Robert McCloud. The museum is housed in the eastbound railroad station building of the Stratford station of the Metro-North Railroad.

The National Helicopter Museum collects and exhibits images and objects related to the long history of the aviation and helicopter industry in Stratford, the home of Sikorsky Aircraft company. Sikorsky Aircraft built the experimental helicopters developed by inventor Igor Sikorsky.

The National Helicopter Museum traces the evolution of the rotary wing from early predecessors like the boomerang and Chinese tops to designs by Leonardo da Vinci and George Cayley to early motorized experiments to modern helicopters of today.

Igor Sikorsky's first helicopter success in Stratford on September 14, 1939 is documented as well as his subsequent productions.

Also displayed are the small gas turbine engines developed locally by Dr. Anselm Franz at Avco Lycoming which power such helicopters as the Bell Helicopter UH-1 Iroquois or Huey and the Boeing CH-47 Chinook.

Other exhibits include ones on tilt rotor development; current photos and models of aircraft by Bell, Boeing, Kaman Aircraft, Robinson Helicopter, and Sikorsky; and a working cockpit of the Sikorsky S-76 helicopter.

== See also ==
- American Helicopter Museum, Pennsylvania, USA
- Classic Rotors Museum, California, USA
- The Helicopter Museum, Somerset, England
- Hubschraubermuseum Bückeburg, Germany
