= September 2013 New Haven Line power outage =

Unplanned electrical power outage

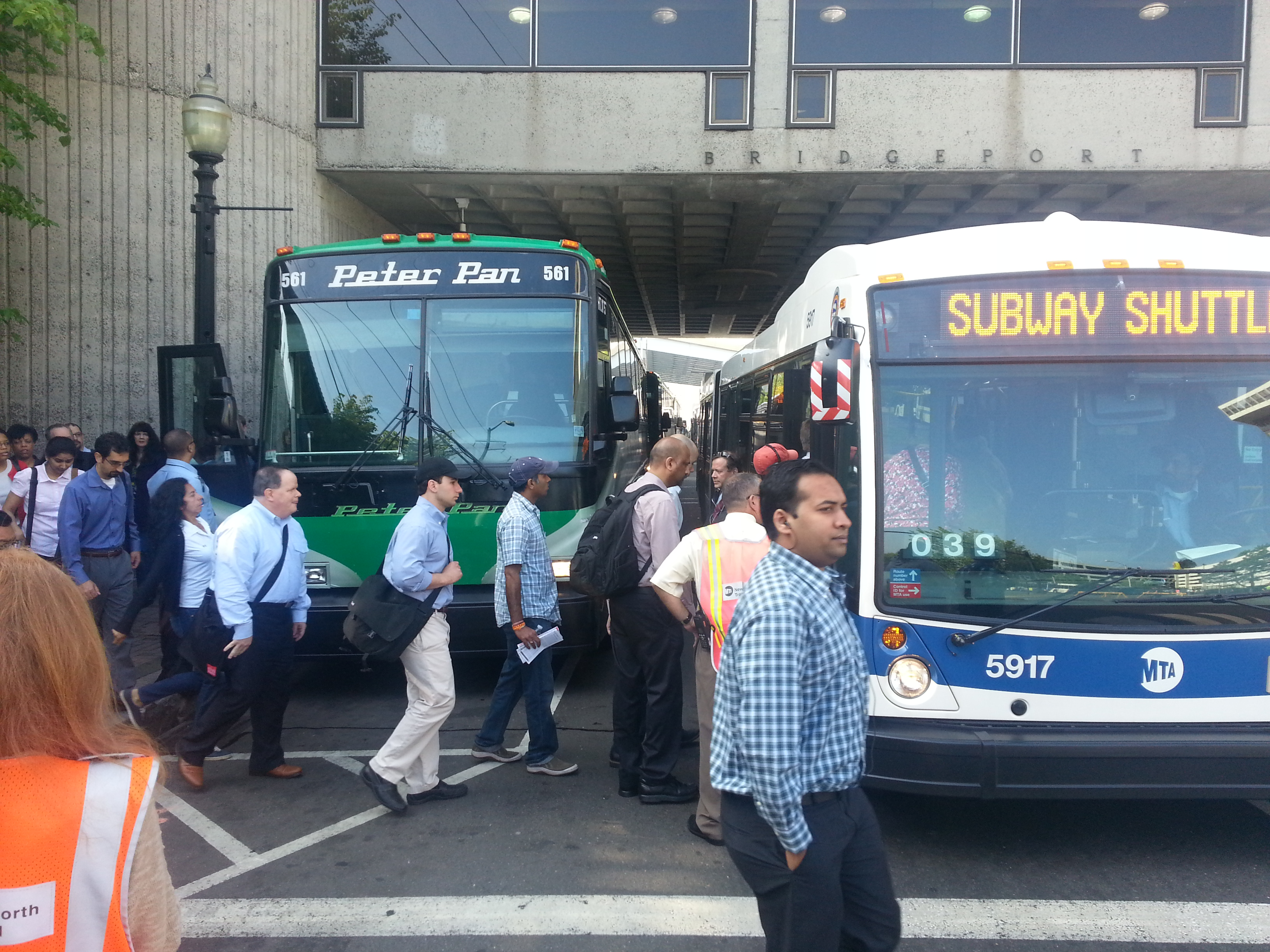
- Passengers boarding shuttle buses during the service disruption

- Location within New York

Details
- Date: 25 September 2013; 05:22 (EST)
- Location: Mount Vernon, New York
- Coordinates: 40.9112°N 73.8293°W
- Country: United States
- Line: New Haven Line
- Operator: Metro-North Railroad
- Cause: Power outage

Statistics
- Passengers: 125,000 daily weekday riders impacted for 12 days

The September 2013 New Haven Line power outage was an unplanned electrical power outage that impacted service on Metro-North Railroad's New Haven Line for twelve days in 2013. On September 25, 2013, a 138-kV main feeder cable from Con Edison that provided electricity to an AC catenary-powered 8-mile (13 km) segment of the New Haven Line failed, causing electric train service over the line to halt between Mount Vernon, New York and Harrison, New York.

== Background ==
Metro-North Railroad's New Haven Line operates from New Haven, Connecticut, to Grand Central Terminal in New York City. The New Haven Line's ridership, at 125,000 weekday and 39 million annual passengers, ranks as the busiest rail line in the United States.

In early September 2013, construction was underway at Metro-North Railroad's Mount Vernon station for replacement of existing power transformers with new transformers that would enable regenerative braking capability on the New Haven Line between the Mount Vernon station and the Harrison station. The New York Power Authority was assisting Metro-North Railroad with oversight of the construction, which was being performed by contractors. Con Edison controlled power supply to the Metro-North Railroad station.

== Power failure ==
The other redundant feeder cable that supplied power to that segment was out-of-service due to a planned electric equipment upgrade at the Metro-North station. There was no formal contingency plan in place between Con Edison and Metro-North in case of the failure. An attempt to draw power from a Connecticut substation in Cos Cob failed to provide enough power to supply full service on the line, and was instead used to rescue stranded trains. Metro-North used diesel locomotives and alternative bus service to carry passengers until full service was restored after 12 days of disruption.

Con Edison initially provided this short-notice power by modifying available electric transformers and other equipment to Metro-North's unique power-consumption needs in an adjacent temporary location. Following the service disruptions, U.S. Senator Richard Blumenthal from Connecticut held a hearing on October 28, 2013, to find out what happened during the disruption.

== Findings and effects ==
In November 2014, the New York Public Service Commission released a public Executive Summary detailing findings from an investigation into the event. The outage was caused by liquid nitrogen, which was being used to control dielectric fluid flow in the out-of-service feeder, freezing the dielectric fluid in the adjacent live feeder supplying the sole power to the station. Con Edison had performed this type of freeze operation around 18 times a year, and had never experienced this type of failure before.

The Cos Cob link is now able to provide full service power if needed. The monitoring of the use of liquid nitrogen in underground transmission feeders has been modified. There was a short term interest in examining n-1-1 power supply contingencies to various municipal power consumers following the incident.
