= New Haven Line =

Metro-North Railroad line in New York and Connecticut

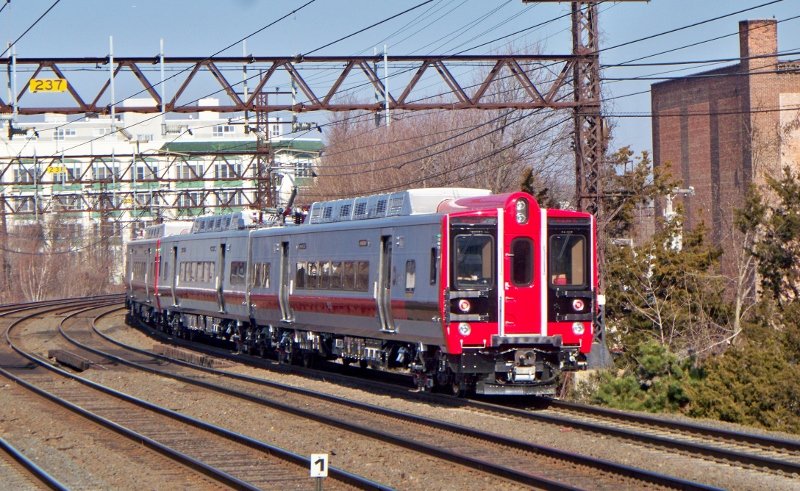
- An outbound train of M8s near Port Chester

Overview
- Owner: CTDOT (in Connecticut); Metro-North (in New York)
- Locale: New York City (Manhattan and The Bronx) and Westchester, Fairfield and New Haven counties
- Termini: Grand Central; New Haven New Haven State Street (limited service)
- Stations: 30 main; 17 branch

Service
- Type: Commuter rail
- System: Metro-North Railroad
- Services: 1 main line; 3 branches
- Operator: MTA Metro-North Railroad
- Daily ridership: 82,450 (Fall 2024)
- Ridership: 32,074,189 (annual ridership, 2024)

Technical
- Track length: Main Line: 74 mi (119 km); New Canaan Branch: 7.9 mi (12.7 km); Danbury Branch: 23.6 mi (38.0 km); Waterbury Branch: 27 mi (43 km)
- Character: Main Line: 4 (3 Housatonic River–Milford); Branches: 1
- Track gauge: 4 ft 8 1/2 in (1,435 mm) standard gauge
- Electrification: Third rail, 750 V DC (south of Pelham); Overhead line, 12.5 kV 60 Hz AC (north of Mount Vernon East)
- Operating speed: 80 mph (130 km/h) max.
Route map
New Haven Main Line highlighted in red

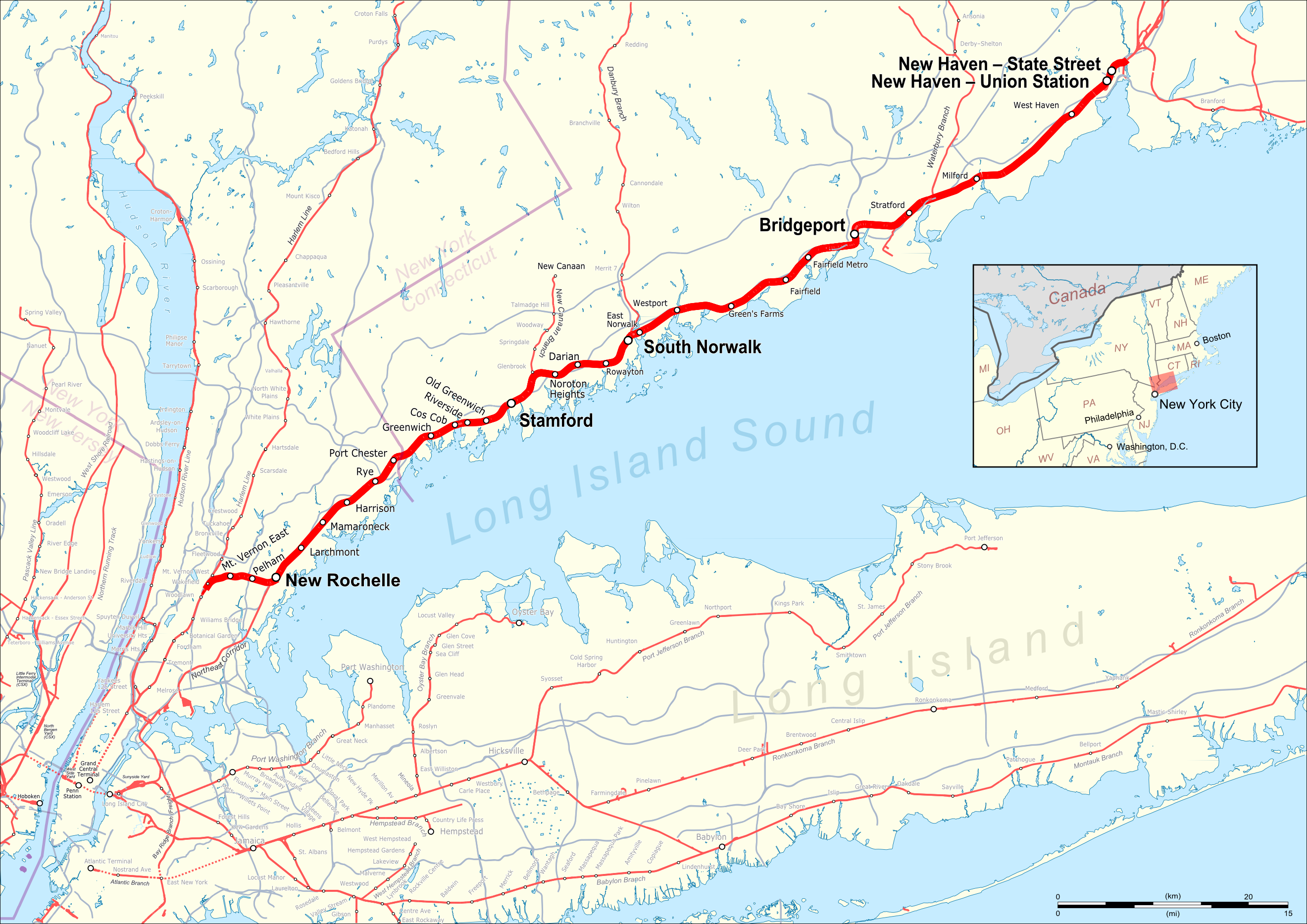

The New Haven Line is a 72.7 mi (117.0 km) commuter rail line operated by the Metro-North Railroad in the U.S. states of New York and Connecticut. Running from New Haven, Connecticut, to New York City, the New Haven Line joins the Harlem Line in Mount Vernon, New York, and continues south to Grand Central Terminal in Manhattan. The New Haven Line carried 32.07 million passengers in 2024. The busiest intermediate station is Stamford, with 8.4 million passengers, or 21% of the line's ridership.

The line was originally part of the New York, New Haven and Hartford Railroad, forming the southern leg of the New Haven's main line. It is colored red on Metro-North timetables and system maps, and stations on the line have red trim. The red color-coding is a nod to the red paint used in the New Haven's paint scheme for much of the last decade of its history. The section from Grand Central to the New York–Connecticut border is owned by Metro-North and the section from the state line to New Haven is owned by the Connecticut Department of Transportation (CTDOT). From west to east in Connecticut, three branches split off: the New Canaan Branch, Danbury Branch, and Waterbury Branch, all owned by CTDOT.

The New Haven Line runs on a section of the Northeast Corridor, which is the busiest rail line in the United States. Amtrak's Northeast Regional and Acela use the line between New Rochelle, New York, and New Haven, and five New Haven Line stations are shared with Amtrak. Local freight service is provided on the line in Connecticut by CSX Transportation, and the Providence and Worcester Railroad operates unit trains of stone along the line.

== History ==
=== Before Metro-North ===
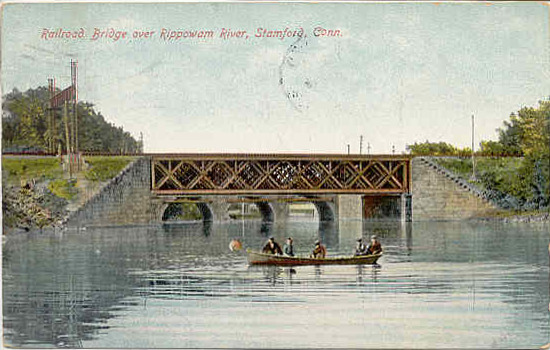
At the Mill (Rippowam) River crossing, Stamford, Connecticut, about 1908

The rail line from New York to New Haven was completed by 1849, and commuters started using the trains soon afterward. The line was part of the New York and New Haven Railroad — after 1872, the New York, New Haven and Hartford Railroad — which had trackage rights over the New York Central Railroad's New York and Harlem Railroad into Grand Central.

The Great Blizzard of 1888 blocked the rail line in Westport, between the Saugatuck and Green's Farms stations. It took eight days to restore service, as snow was dug out by hand.

The line was grade separated into a cut in Mount Vernon in 1893 as a result of multiple collisions between trains and horsecars.

As part of the construction of Grand Central Terminal in the early 1900s, all of New York Central's lines that ran into the terminal were electrified. Third rail was installed on the Hudson and Harlem Divisions, while the New Haven Division received overhead wires on the segments that were not shared with the Harlem and Hudson Division. Steam locomotives on the New Haven Division were replaced with electric locomotives, and later electric multiple units. New Haven Division electric trains started running to Grand Central in October 1907. The replacement of the Housatonic River Railroad Bridge that year completed quadruple-tracking of the line from Woodlawn Junction to New Haven.

The New Haven was merged into Penn Central in 1969. On November 25, 1969, Penn Central, the Metropolitan Transportation Authority, and the states of New York and Connecticut agreed that New York would buy its section of the line and Connecticut would lease its section as far as New Haven. The acquisition took place on January 1, 1971, and included the three branches. After Penn Central went bankrupt, the Consolidated Rail Corporation (Conrail) took over operations in 1976. The MTA took over operations in 1983, and merged Conrail's former commuter rail lines in the New York area into Metro-North. The MTA undertook to rebuild the railroad, upgrading signals, tracks, ties, roadbeds, and rolling stock.

=== New and closed infrastructure ===
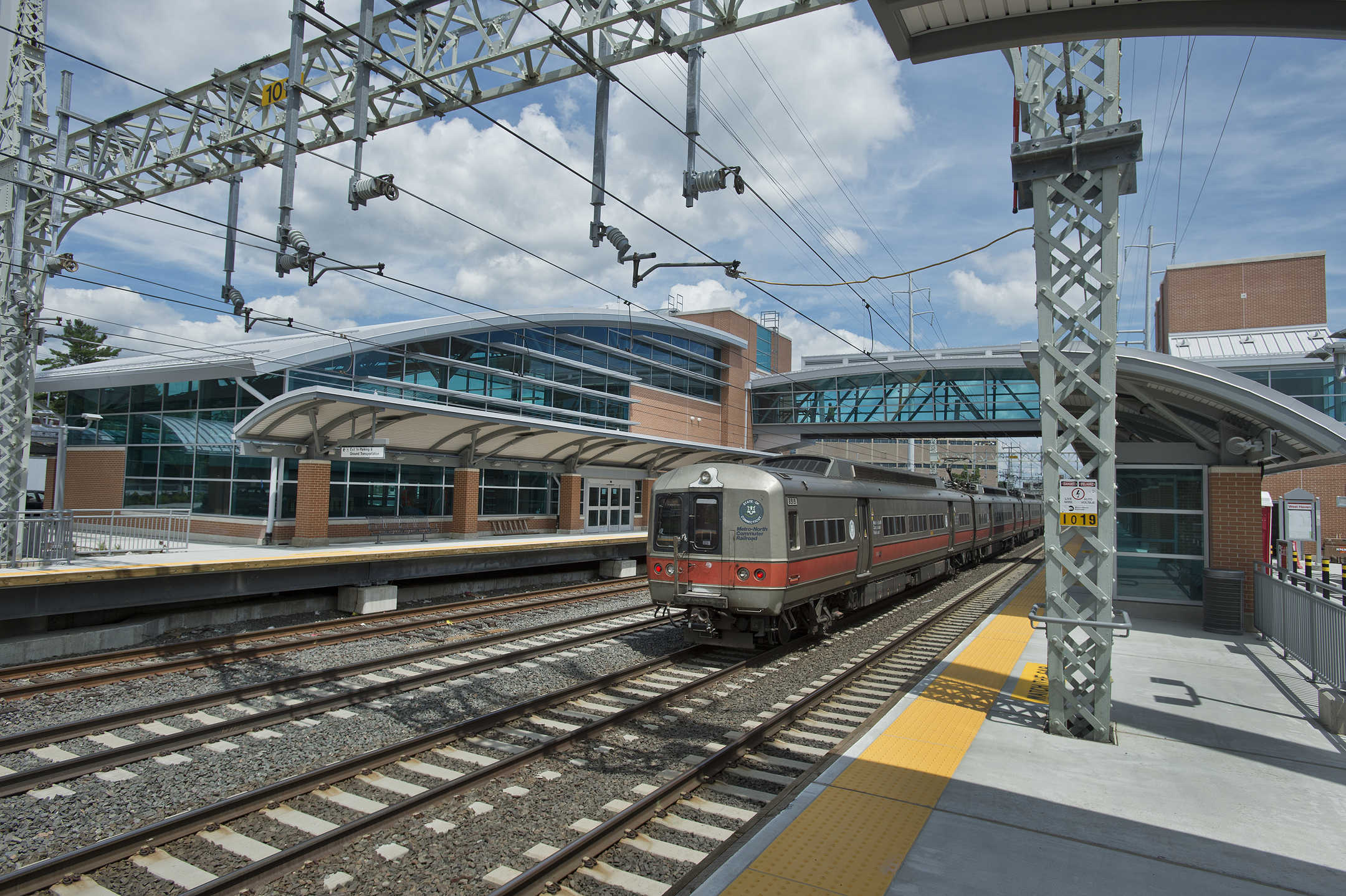
West Haven station shortly after opening in 2013

Over the years, some stations have been abandoned or closed, and some characteristics of the line have changed. The Columbus Avenue station in Mount Vernon was closed in the Penn Central era, due to its proximity to Mt. Vernon station and the expense of converting it to high-level platforms. It had previously been a transfer station to the overhead viaduct station of the New York, Westchester and Boston Railway; an impressive ruin remains and is easily visible from passing trains. Other stations abandoned along the mainline include Devon, at the junction of the Waterbury Branch, and Norwalk, replaced by South Norwalk. The changeover from catenary to third rail was moved from Woodlawn to just west of Pelham in the early 1990s; this was done to eliminate the cost of maintaining catenary under old bridges in Mount Vernon and to move the changeover point to a section of level track to prevent momentum problems when trains change between catenary and third rail. The catenary poles are still intact as they carry several communications lines. There is an abandoned rail yard just east of Port Chester station.

The New Haven's Harlem River and Port Chester Railroad, diverging from the main line below New Rochelle, ran local passenger service to the Harlem River Terminal in the South Bronx until 1931, and has several abandoned stations. It was a major freight route for the New Haven to Queens, where it interchanged with the Long Island Rail Road and the Pennsylvania Railroad. Four new stations are planned along this route as part of Metro-North's Penn Station Access.

As a largely four-track electrified mainline, the New Haven Line is capable of supporting a mix of local and express service, allowing for a higher density of stations than many other commuter rail lines. By the beginning of the 20th century, there were stations in every population center along the line. Some of these were dropped over the years due to low ridership, and no new stations were added to the New Haven Line mainline for over 100 years (Merritt 7 station on the Danbury Branch opened in 1985). Fairfield Metro (now Fairfield–Black Rock) opened in December 2011 to support a new commercial development. After a decade-long process choosing between locations in West Haven and Orange, West Haven station opened in August 2013, filling the longest gap on the line. Currently, a study is being undertaken to detail the costs and benefits of implementing more frequent service on the line. The line would have to be upgraded to accommodate additional service.

On July 11, 2022, six new express trains were added to the New Haven Line, only stopping at New Haven, Bridgeport, and Stamford, and Grand Central. These trains, of which three would run in the morning, and three would run in the evening, would operate to Grand Central in as little as 99 minutes.

=== Incidents and accidents ===
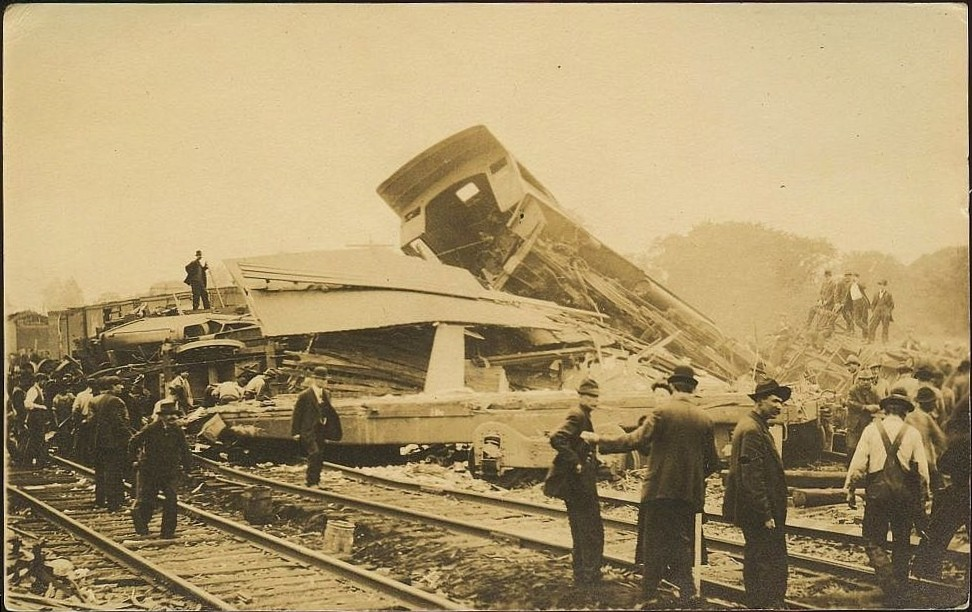
A 1911 wreck in Fairfield involving 4 trains

==== Fatal accidents ====
The Norwalk rail accident occurred at the Norwalk River bridge in Norwalk, Connecticut, on May 6, 1853, killing 48 people. Another occurred in Westport, Connecticut, in 1895, and another in that town on October 3, 1912. Another fatality occurred in August 1969 on the New Canaan Branch, which prompted the line's then-operator, Penn Central, to stop operating northbound and southbound trains simultaneously on the branch. There was also a collision between two trains in Mount Vernon in 1988, which killed an engineer. In 2012 two people were killed by a train-car collision at an ungated grade crossing on the Danbury Branch in Redding, Connecticut, and in 2013 a track worker was struck and killed in West Haven.

==== Non-fatal incidents ====
The May 2013 Fairfield train crash resulted in 72 injuries after two trains collided following a derailment near Fairfield.

On September 25, 2013, a Con Edison failure required the use of diesel locomotives and bus service between Mount Vernon and Harrison for 12 days.

== Operations ==
=== Passenger service ===
==== Main Line ====
New Haven Line mainline trains primarily use electric multiple units (EMU) consisting of Kawasaki M8 railcars.

All New Haven Line electric trains change over between third rail and overhead catenary between Mount Vernon East and Pelham at normal track speed. Inbound trains to Grand Central lower their pantographs in this area, while outbound trains raise them; the third rail shoes stay in the same position both in and out of third rail territory. Both catenary and third rail overlap for a quarter-mile between Mount Vernon East and Pelham to facilitate this changeover. When the line was first electrified in 1907, trains transitioned between third rail and overhead catenary at Woodlawn Heights, approximately 2 miles (3.2 km) southwest of Pelham. This changeover is still needed today, for the New Haven Line and Harlem Line share trackage between Grand Central and Mount Vernon; the two lines split just north of the Harlem Line's Woodlawn station.

Stamford Transportation Center divides the New Haven Line's mainline into an "inner zone" and an "outer zone". Inner zone trains run local, serving all stops between Grand Central and Stamford. Outer zone trains run express between Grand Central and Stamford, making only one intermediate stop at Harlem-125th Street, before running local between Stamford and New Haven.

The entire New Haven Line mainline is grade-separated with no grade crossings, although there are several privately marked-pedestrian crossings in many of the storage yards such as the East Side Yard in Bridgeport.

==== Branch Lines ====
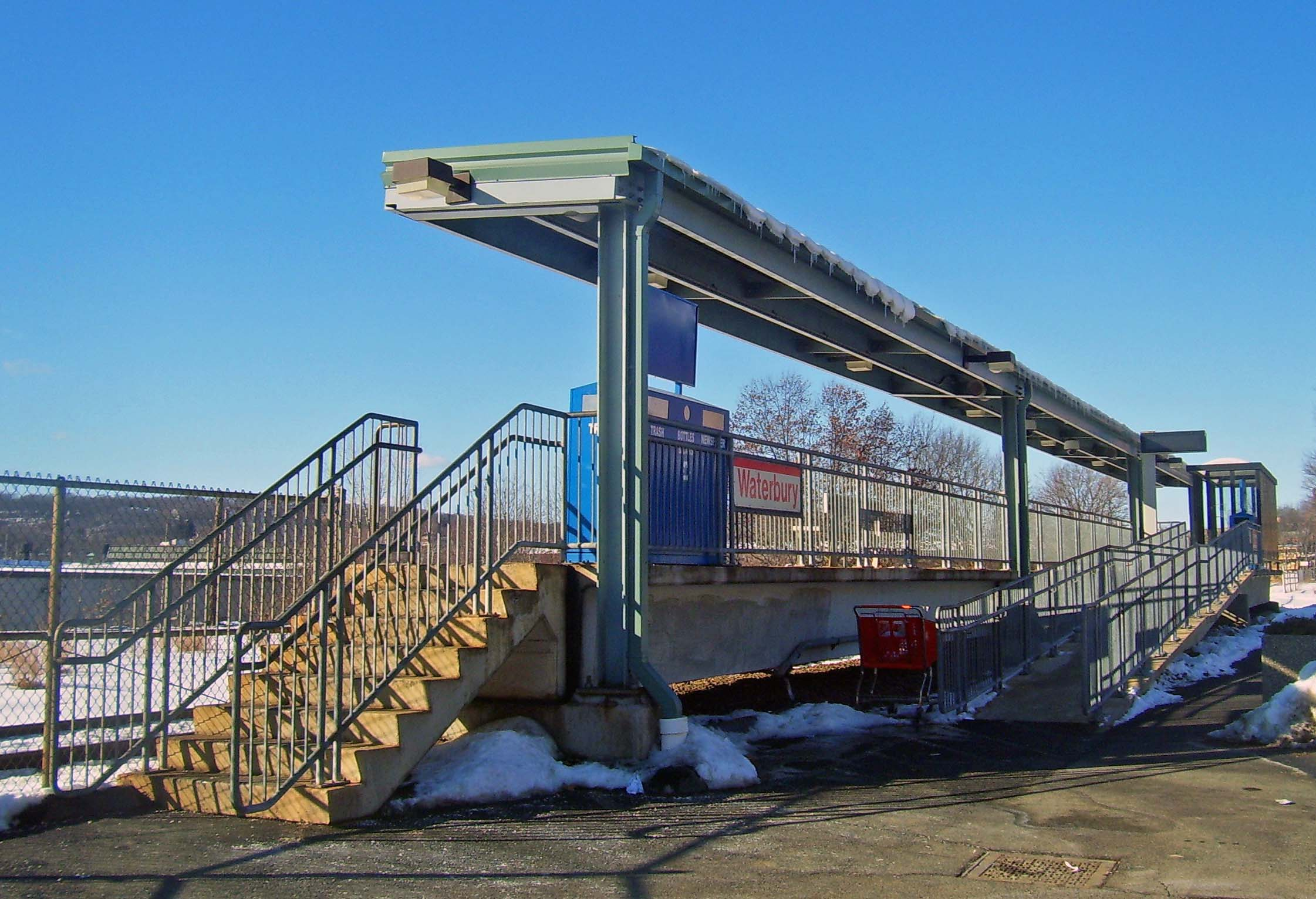
Waterbury station is the northern terminus of the Waterbury Branch

Within the Metro-North system, the New Haven Line is the only line with operating branch lines. These three branch lines are the New Canaan Branch, the Danbury Branch, and the Waterbury Branch. The New Canaan Branch is electrified, and uses the same Kawasaki M8 railcars as the main line. The Danbury Branch and Waterbury Branches, on the other hand, use Shoreliner consists powered by diesel locomotives. Some main line trains will occasionally use diesel equipment in revenue runs for positioning or due to equipment shortages.

The New Haven Railroad, Metro-North's predecessor, had an extensive branch network in Connecticut, including: a branch off the Danbury Branch at the aptly named Branchville, CT to Ridgefield, CT; another branch off the main line for freight at Bridgeport known as the Berkshire (a never-used bridge spans the Merritt Parkway in Trumbull that would have accommodated this branch under potential reactivation scenarios); and the Maybrook line, which connected the Waterbury Branch with the Danbury Branch, with several branches of its own.

Branch line trains generally operate as their own zone and terminate at a main line station; passengers can then transfer to a train bound for another main line station or Grand Central. The southern terminus for each branch line is Stamford on the New Canaan Branch, South Norwalk on the Danbury Branch, and Bridgeport on the Waterbury Branch. All trains run local on their respective branch lines. During peak hours, however, some trains on the New Canaan and Danbury Branches run limited one-seat service to Grand Central; these trains run express on the main line but still make all stops on their respective branch lines.

Unlike the main line, the New Haven Line branches operate almost entirely at grade, with frequent crossings.

==== Sports special services ====
===== Yankee Stadium =====
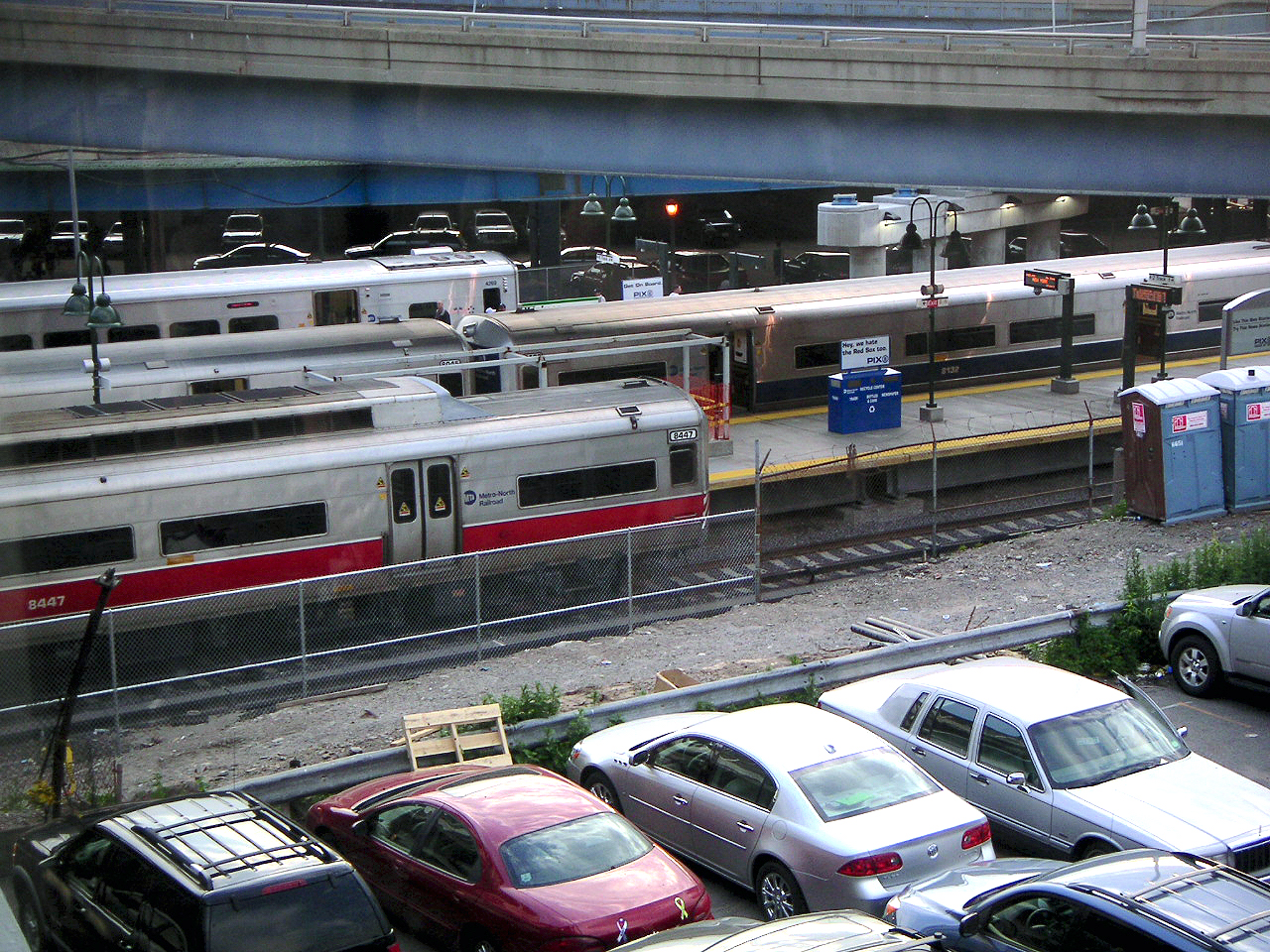
New Haven Line equipment at Yankees – East 153rd Street station in 2009

Yankees–East 153rd Street station opened on May 23, 2009. Although it is a Hudson Line commuter station, it offers New Haven and Harlem Line commuters direct game-day service on weekends and after weeknight games, and shuttle service from Harlem–125th Street station during peak periods. The Yankee Stadium station, Harlem-125th Street and Fordham are the three Metro-North stations that serve New Haven Line customers without being located on the Line itself.

===== Meadowlands game day service =====
The Train to the Game service on the New Haven Line to the Meadowlands Sports Complex operated only for Sunday 1 pm New York Giants and New York Jets NFL games. The first game scheduled was on September 20, 2009, when the New York Jets hosted the New England Patriots, following a successful test of trains in non-revenue service on August 23.

The service was operated using NJ Transit equipment under an operating agreement among NJT, Metro-North, and Amtrak. NJT equipment was required as its electric locomotive power was capable of running under the various catenary systems over three separate railroads using different power supplies. The program was only offered for the early afternoon games so that the NJT equipment could be moved back in place for the Monday morning rush hour.

The service made limited stops on New Haven Line, and used the Hell Gate Line to access New York Penn Station and Secaucus Junction. At Secaucus, riders transferred to a shuttle on the Meadowlands Rail Line. Stops included New Haven, West Haven, Bridgeport, Fairfield, Westport, South Norwalk, Stamford, Greenwich, Rye, Larchmont, Penn Station, and Secaucus.

==== Shared trackage and operating agreements ====
Although the New Haven Line shares track with the Harlem Line in the Bronx, along this line it stops only at Fordham, due to an 1848 agreement with the Harlem Line's predecessor railroad, the New York Central. This agreement granted the New Haven predecessor New York, New Haven and Hartford Railroad trackage rights over the Harlem Line to Grand Central Terminal, but restricted its service in the Bronx to discharge service only (i.e. no boarding revenue passengers). This agreement continued until 2019, due to the operating agreement between Metro-North and the Connecticut Department of Transportation (CTDOT), which means passengers traveling between Fordham and Manhattan could not ride on a New Haven Line train. Beginning April 14, 2019, passengers heading to and from Grand Central can also travel on New Haven Line trains. This was a result of an agreement reached with CTDOT, under which revenue from tickets between Fordham and Manhattan would be split between Metro-North and CTDOT. While the New Haven Line's one stop in the Bronx is currently at Fordham, from 1848 until the 1920s that stop was instead at Woodlawn.

The New Haven Line is also operated in Connecticut under an agreement between Metro-North and the CTDOT, in which costs for main line operation are shared (currently 65% CTDOT and 35% Metro-North) and costs for branch service are borne 100% by CTDOT. Amtrak pays Metro-North for the right to run its trains on the line using its electrical system and the resulting increase in maintenance needs. This payment totaled approximately $11.8 million in 2013. Metro-North dispatches Amtrak trains on the line and receives bonus payments from Amtrak for keeping its trains running on time. When Metro-North fails to do so, it is required to pay penalties to Amtrak.

=== Freight service ===
The Providence and Worcester Railroad has overhead rights on the New Haven Line, allowing it to operate stone trains from Cedar Hill Yard in New Haven to a connection with the New York and Atlantic Railway in New York City. CSX Transportation also provides freight service for several customers on the line from Cedar Hill.

=== Infrastructure ===
==== Control points/signals ====
Since 1996, the New Haven main line and New Canaan branch have used Automatic Train Control (ATC) in conjunction with cab signals, a safety feature used in routing trains, keeping safe distances, and moderating train speeds. Signals are controlled from a centralized location, the Operations Control Center in New York City. Until the 1980s, the New Haven Line had a decentralized signaling system, and each section of track was controlled by a separate switch tower. The switch towers themselves did not get radio communication with each other until the late 1960s, when Penn Central took over the New Haven Line. Track interlockings are governed within Control Point boundaries, or CPs. The New Haven Line is unique in that the CPs are known (informally) by nicknames for their region. In December 2020, Positive Train Control was fully implemented on the mainline and several branch lines.

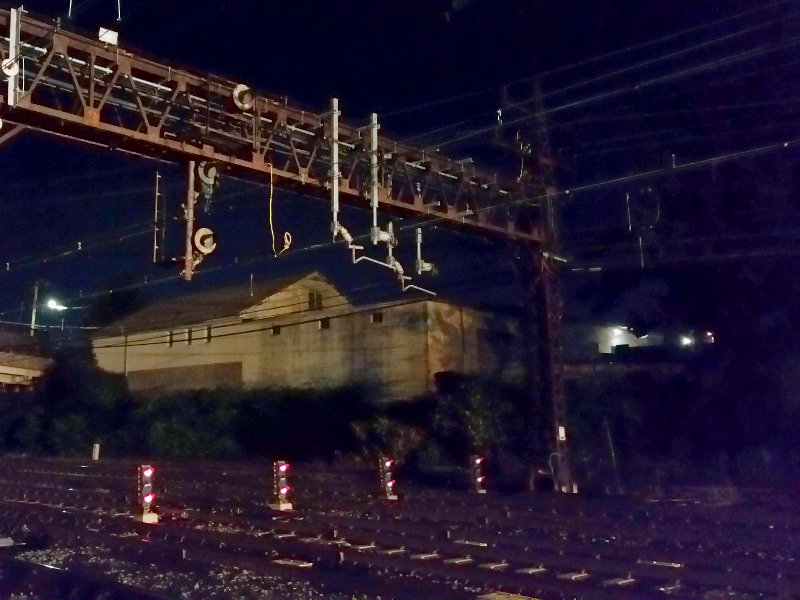
New Haven Line catenary pole at CP 257 showing one remaining old-style signal (no longer used) and track-level dwarf signals that replaced it.

Signals on the New Haven Line had once been mounted on the catenary bridges; these were all replaced throughout the 1990s and into the early 2000s with wayside "dwarf" signals at track level along the right-of-way. The form of signalization known as Centralized Traffic Control, or CTC, is used on the main line and the New Canaan Branch, as well as on the Danbury and Waterbury Branches starting in 2013 and 2021 respectively.

==== Traction power substations ====
The New Haven's traction power system was originally constructed to operate at 11 kV, 25 Hz, using power supplied by the Cos Cob Power Station. The power station was shut down around 1986 and Metro-North converted the traction power system to 60 Hz operation. Traction power is converted from utility-supplied 115 kV (single phase) to 27 kV (single phase with center tap), which is distributed using an auto-transformer system. Power is supplied to the catenary at 12.5 kV, 60 Hz.

== Stations ==
The following connecting rail services are available from Amtrak, Metro-North Railroad and Shore Line East.

Milepost Zero on the New Haven Line is at the north property line of 42nd Street (i.e. 200–300 ft south of the ends of the tracks).

State	Zone	Location	Station	Miles (km)	Date opened	Date closed	Connections / notes
NY	1	Manhattan	Grand Central Terminal	0.0 (0)	October 6, 1871		Metro-North Railroad: ■ Harlem Line, ■ Hudson Line; Long Island Rail Road: ■ Babylon Branch, ■ Far Rockaway Branch, ■ Hempstead Branch, ■ Long Beach Branch, ■ Port Jefferson Branch, ■ Port Washington Branch, ■ Ronkonkoma Branch, ■ West Hempstead Branch (at Grand Central Madison); NYC Subway: MTA Bus, NYCT Bus
NY	1	Manhattan	59th Street				Built during the late 1870s, although trains never stopped here.
NY	1	Manhattan	72nd Street			June 23, 1901	
NY	1	Manhattan	86th Street	2.2 (3.5)	May 15, 1876	June 23, 1901	
NY	1	Manhattan	110th Street	3.4 (5.5)	May 15, 1876	June 17, 1906	
NY	1	Manhattan	Harlem–125th Street	4.2 (6.8)	October 25, 1897		Metro-North Railroad: ■ Harlem Line, ■ Hudson Line; NYC Subway: (at 125th Street); NYCT Bus
NY	2	The Bronx					
NY	2	The Bronx	138th Street	5.0 (8.0)	c. 1858	July 2, 1972	
NY	2	The Bronx	Morrisania	6.7 (10.8)	c. 1858	July 2, 1972	
NY	2	The Bronx	Claremont Park			c. 1960	
NY	2	The Bronx	183rd Street	8.5 (13.7)		July 2, 1972	
NY	2	The Bronx	Fordham	8.9 (14.3)			Metro-North Railroad: ■ Harlem Line; NYCT Bus, MTA Bus, Bee-Line Bus
NY	12	Mount Vernon	Mount Vernon East	14.0 (22.5)	December 20, 1972		Bee-Line Bus
NY	12	Mount Vernon	Columbus Avenue			December 20, 1972	Columbus Avenue and the old Mount Vernon East were consolidated on December 20, 1972.
NY	12	Village of Pelham	Pelham	15.1 (24.3)	1851		Bee-Line Bus
NY	12	New Rochelle	New Rochelle	16.6 (26.7)	December 25, 1848		Amtrak: Northeast Regional; Bee-Line Bus
NY	13	Larchmont	Larchmont	18.7 (30.1)			Bee-Line Bus
NY	13	Village of Mamaroneck	Mamaroneck	20.5 (33.0)	December 25, 1848		Bee-Line Bus
NY	13	Harrison	Harrison	22.2 (35.7)	c. 1870		Bee-Line Bus
NY	14	City of Rye	Rye	24.1 (38.8)	December 25, 1848		Bee-Line Bus
NY	14	Port Chester	Port Chester	25.7 (41.4)	December 25, 1848		Bee-Line Bus, CTtransit Stamford
CT	15	Town of Greenwich	Greenwich	28.1 (45.2)	December 25, 1848		CTtransit Stamford, Norwalk Transit District
CT	15	Town of Greenwich	Cos Cob	29.6 (47.6)	December 25, 1848		
CT	15	Town of Greenwich	Riverside	30.2 (48.6)			
CT	15	Town of Greenwich	Old Greenwich	31.2 (50.2)	1892		CTtransit Stamford: 311, 324
CT	16	Stamford	Stamford; Transportation Center	33.0 (53.1)	December 25, 1848		Amtrak: Acela, Northeast Regional, Vermonter; Metro-North Railroad: ■ New Canaan Branch, ■ Danbury Branch (peak service); CT Rail: Shore Line East (limited service); CTtransit Stamford, Stamford Commuter Shuttle, UConn Stamford Shuttle; Intercity bus: Greyhound, Peter Pan
CT	16	Town of Darien	Noroton Heights	36.2 (58.3)			CTtransit Stamford
CT	16	Town of Darien	Darien	37.7 (60.7)	December 25, 1848		CTtransit Stamford
CT	16	Norwalk	Rowayton	39.2 (63.1)			Norwalk Transit District
CT	17	Norwalk	South Norwalk	41.0 (66.0)			Metro-North Railroad: ■ Danbury Branch; Norwalk Transit District
CT	17	Norwalk	East Norwalk	42.0 (67.6)			Norwalk Transit District
CT	18	Town of Westport	Westport	44.2 (71.1)	December 25, 1848		Norwalk Transit District Also known as Saugatuck
CT	18	Town of Westport	Green's Farms	47.2 (76.0)			Norwalk Transit District
CT	18	Southport	Southport	48.9 (78.7)	December 25, 1848		Greater Bridgeport Transit
CT	18	Fairfield	Fairfield	50.5 (81.3)	December 25, 1848		Greater Bridgeport Transit, Fairfield University Shuttle
CT	18	Fairfield	Fairfield–Black Rock	52.3 (84.2)	2011		Greater Bridgeport Transit
CT	19	Bridgeport	Bridgeport	55.4 (89.2)	1840		Amtrak: Northeast Regional, Vermonter; Metro-North Railroad: ■ Waterbury Branch; CT Rail: Shore Line East (limited service); Greater Bridgeport Transit, Sacred Heart University Transit Shuttle, University of Bridgeport Shuttle; Intercity bus: Greyhound, Peter Pan; Bridgeport & Port Jefferson Ferry
CT	19	Bridgeport	Barnum		2021 (proposed)		Proposed second station in Bridgeport.
CT	20	Stratford	Stratford	59.0 (95.0)	December 25, 1848		Metro-North Railroad: ■ Waterbury Branch; CT Rail: Shore Line East (limited service); Greater Bridgeport Transit
CT	20	Milford					
CT	20	Milford	Devon Transfer		May 2015 April 2016	October 2015 November 2016	Site of former NHRR station, briefly opened as a Waterbury Branch transfer point during bridge rehabilitation
CT	20	Milford	Milford	63.2 (101.7)	December 25, 1848		CT Rail: Shore Line East (limited service); Milford Transit, CTtransit New Haven
CT	20	Orange	Orange		2021 (proposed)		Proposed station.
CT	21	West Haven	West Haven	69.4 (111.7)	1848 2013	c. 1925	CT Rail: Shore Line East (limited service); CTtransit New Haven, University of New Haven Shuttle
CT	21	New Haven	New Haven	72.3 (116.4)	1920		Amtrak: Acela, Hartford Line, Northeast Regional, Valley Flyer, Vermonter; CT Rail: Hartford Line, Shore Line East; CTtransit New Haven, Yale Shuttle, SCSU Shuttle; Intercity bus: Greyhound, Megabus, Peter Pan
CT	21	New Haven	New Haven; State Street	72.7 (117.0)			Amtrak: Hartford Line, Northeast Regional, Valley Flyer; CT Rail: Hartford Line, Shore Line East; CTtransit New Haven; Limited service station

== Rolling stock ==
=== Electric ===
==== M2, M4, M6 cars ====
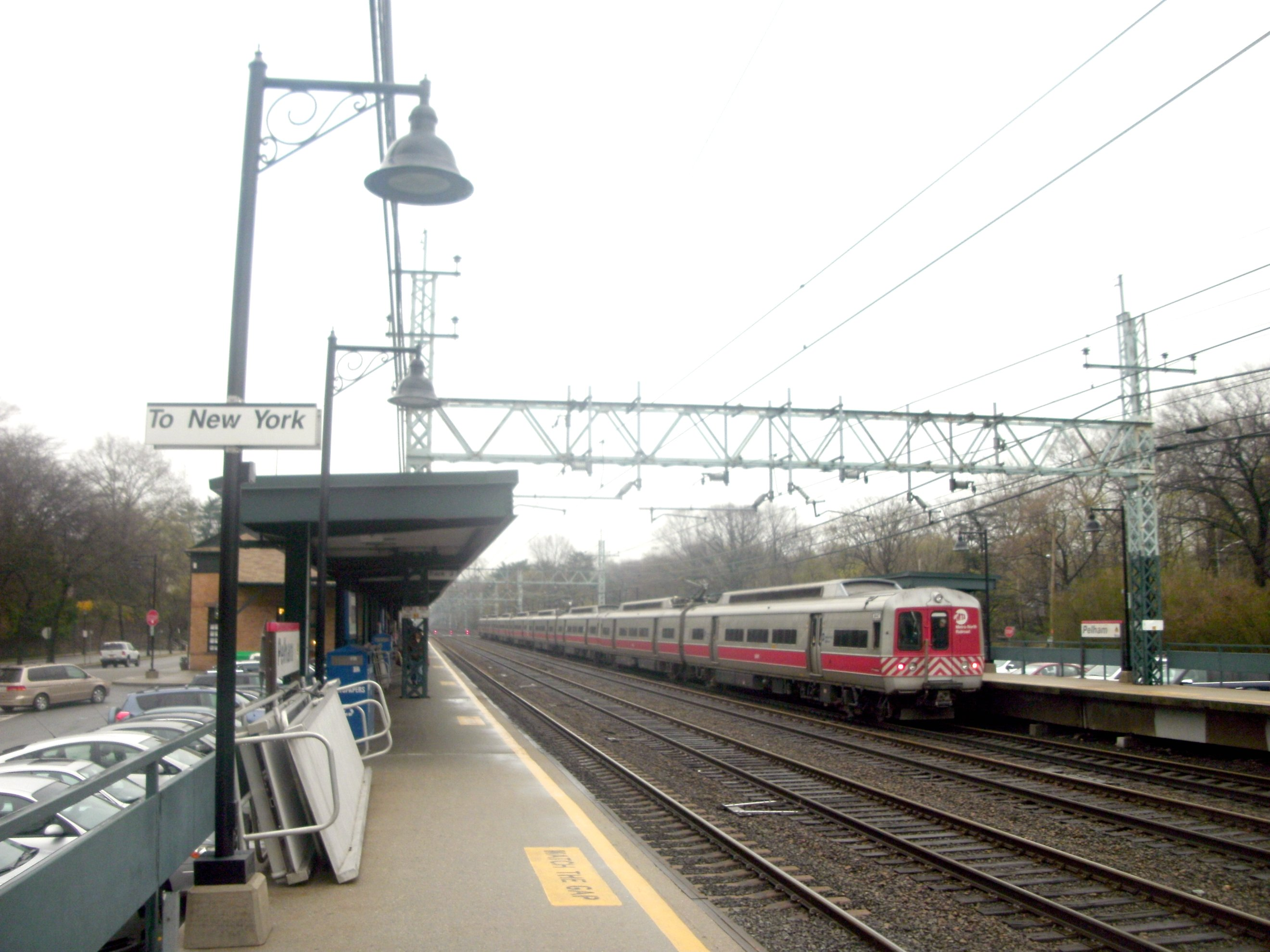
M2 rolling stock at Pelham station

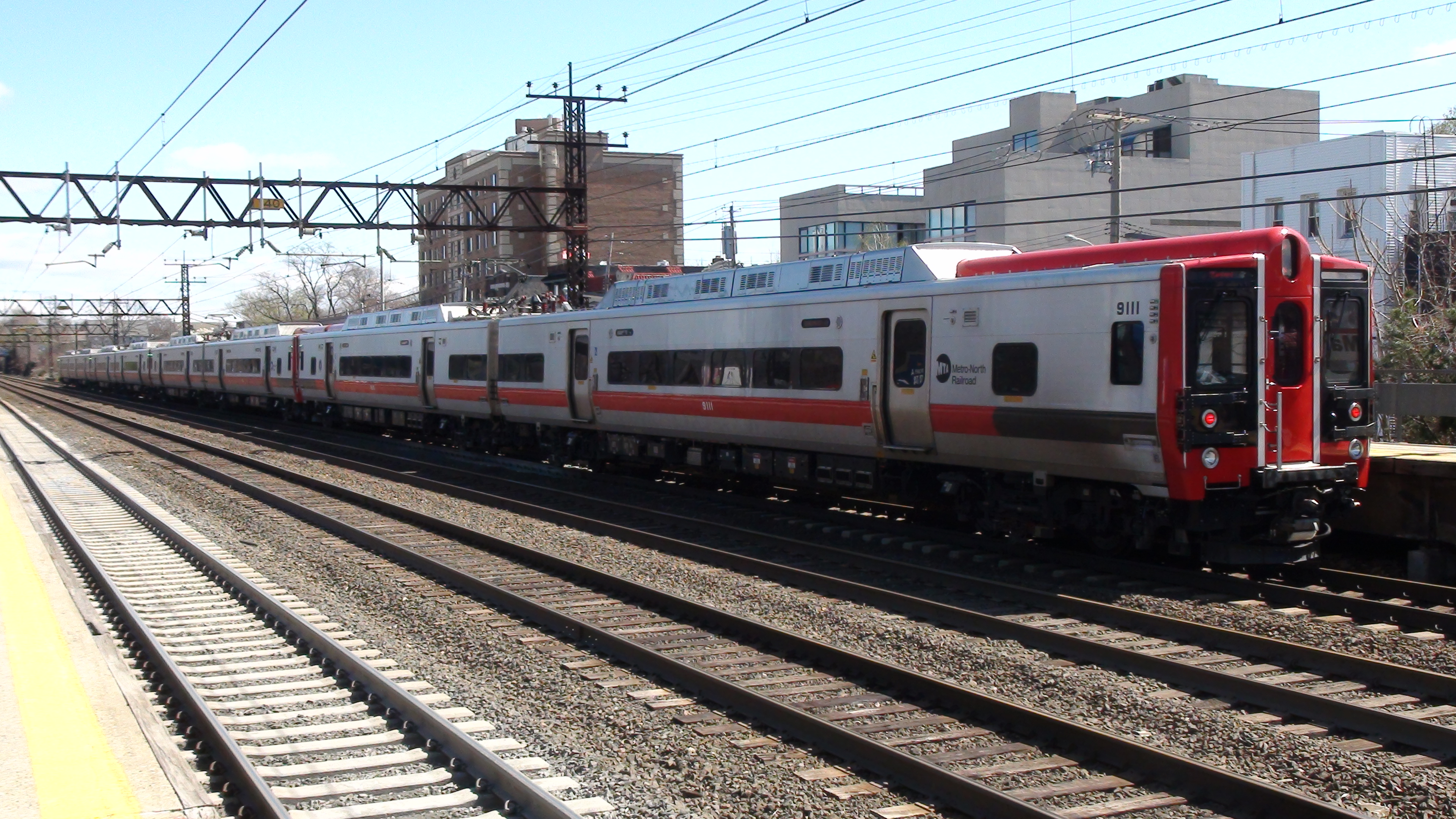
M8 rolling stock at Mamaroneck station

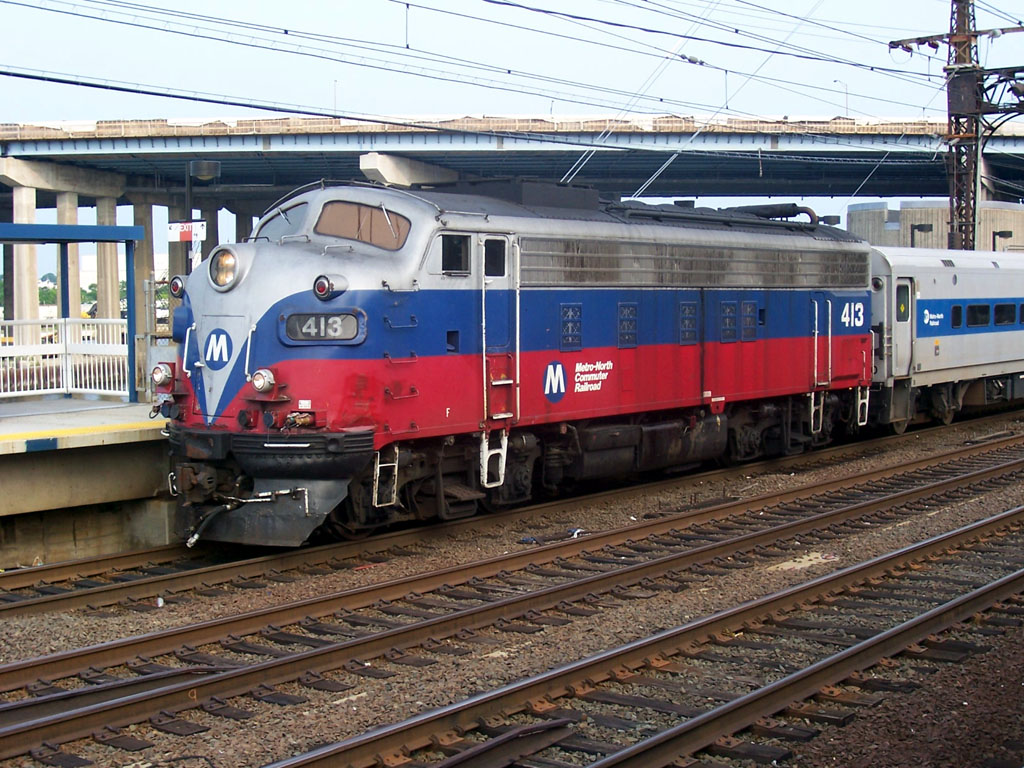
FP10 locomotive at Bridgeport station

Since the main line and the New Canaan Branch are equipped with 12.5 kV 60 Hz overhead catenary, as opposed to just the 750 V DC third rail of the Hudson and Harlem Lines, different rolling stock that can operate with either power system runs on the New Haven Line. This rolling stock, originally produced by General Electric in two batches (144 in 1972–73 and 100 in 1975–77), was initially branded as the M2 Cosmopolitan, with later versions being made on license by Tokyu Car (model M4, 1988) and Morrison-Knudsen (model M6, 1994). Cosmopolitans can be easily spotted by their red stripe along the side, the presence of pantographs on the lead cars in each set, and a dynamic braking grid on the roof.

M2s operated in married pairs, differentiating them from their predecessor equipment of Pullman Standard and 4400-series washboard MU's (retired since the late 1970s and early 1980s). M4s and M6s operated in triplets, with the middle "D" car not having a cab. Many M2s were reconditioned to extend their useful life beyond the expected 25 years, undergoing a Critical Systems Repair (CSR) program.

The CSR program was modified in 2008 as the delivery of M8s neared. Cars that underwent CSR earlier in the program were undergoing additional renovation. Funding was identified in the MTA's 2010 capital program to continue the CSR program if the M4 and M6 cars were not retired; they were ultimately withdrawn in 2015. The M2s were retired in 2018 as sufficient numbers of the Kawasaki-made M8s entered service and alleviated current equipment shortages.

==== M8 cars ====
To replace its aging M2 fleet and increase its total fleet size, Metro-North and CTDOT have undertaken to purchase from Kawasaki Rail Car an initial order of 300 M8 EMUs. The initial order consists of a "base order" of 210 and a "first option" of 90 cars. This order is estimated to cost $760 million. The base order cost is to be split as per the CTDOT/MTA operating agreement (65%/35%, respectively). The M8s each have two single-leaf doors on each side and a full-width operator's cab. The cars are capable of using two types of overhead electrical wires, as well as under-running third rail. The M8s are equipped with Advanced Civil Speed Enforcement System and positive train control. In order to run from New Rochelle to Penn Station as part of the Penn Station Access project, the cars will be equipped with third rail shoes that can operate on both over- and under-running third rail systems.

Originally, delivery of the first six M8 cars for testing was to be in July 2009, but was delayed until December 2009 for varied reasons such as design revisions and production delays. The contract allows for additional options for CTDOT of an additional 80 cars, an option that has since been exercised. On July 20, 2011, the Connecticut Department of Transportation announced the order of 25 unpowered M8 railcars, with options for up to 25 more, at a cost of US$93 million to replace the 48-car M6 fleet. The original order of 405 cars was completed on July 13, 2015, except for the 25 unpowered cars on option. Sixty additional M8 cars were ordered in 2016.

A new rail car facility to accommodate the new M8 cars was built in New Haven. Originally estimated at $300 million, the facility was expected to cost $1 billion by 2014.

=== Diesel ===
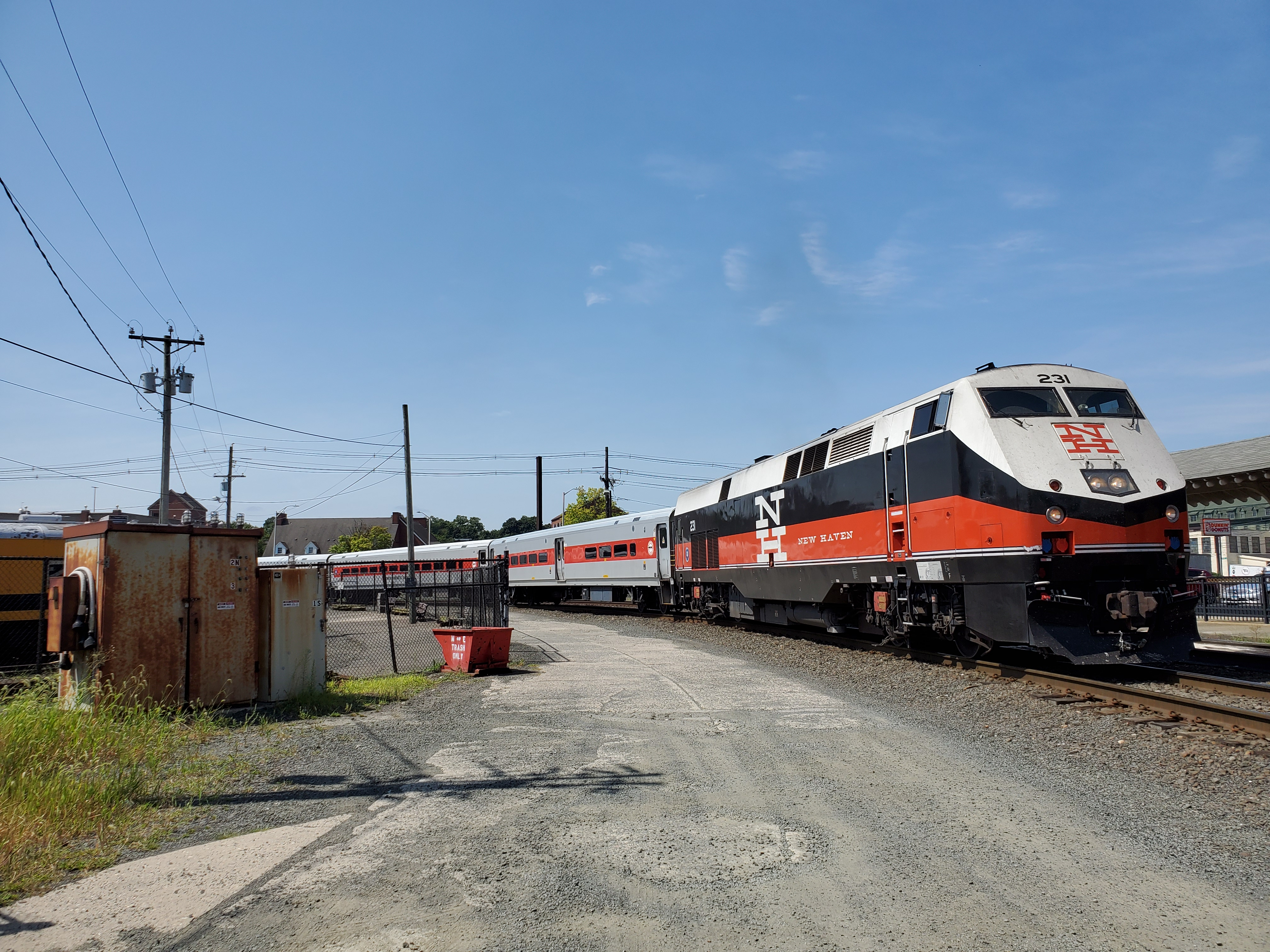
A GE P32AC-DM in New Haven livery leads a train through Danbury

As with the Harlem and Hudson Lines, diesel-powered trains are driven by Brookville BL20GH and dual-mode GE Genesis P32AC-DM locomotives, paired with Shoreliner coaches. While some peak-period trains operate directly to and from Grand Central Terminal with Genesis P32AC-DM dual-mode locomotives only, most New Haven Line diesel-only territory is operated as shuttle service between Danbury and South Norwalk, or between Waterbury and Bridgeport.

=== Pool service ===
The P32AC-DMs used on the New Haven Line are in pool service, meaning that locomotives from either Metro-North or CTDOT can be used on the New Haven Line. Coaches with either paint scheme can also be used. Shore Line East uses a dedicated subfleet of M8 cars with third-rail shoes removed, which cannot be operated into Grand Central, but can be operated into NY Penn Station and Boston, if needed.

== Service expansions ==
=== Planned and proposed stations ===
==== Devon ====
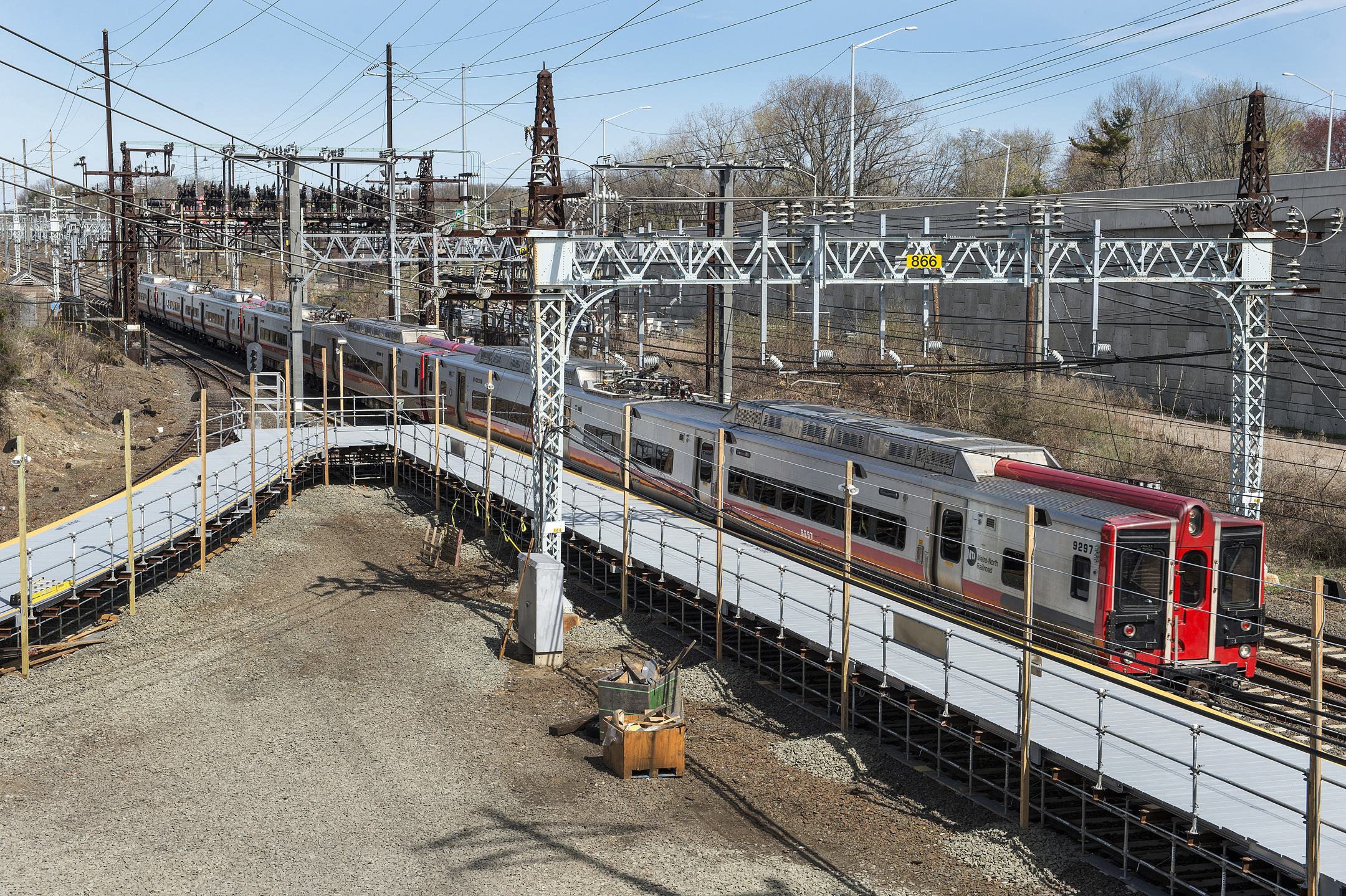
Devon Transfer station in April 2015

A 2010 study of the New Canaan and Waterbury Branches considered the construction of a station at Devon Wye in Milford, Connecticut, where the Waterbury Branch joins the New Haven mainline. The station would allow service to be increased on the branch by running some trains to the new station with connections to New Haven trains, rather than taking up slots on the busy mainline. The two station alternatives would have cost $73 to $114 million.

For six months in 2015, a temporary Devon Transfer station served as the transfer point between mainline service and Waterbury Branch trains. The first phase of repairs to the adjacent Housatonic River Railroad Bridge over the Housatonic River prevented Waterbury Branch trains from accessing the normal transfer point at Bridgeport, necessitating the temporary transfer station. The Devon Transfer station was re-activated in 2016 from April until October to accommodate additional repairs and catenary wire work.

==== Barnum ====
On July 16, 2014, Connecticut Governor Dannel Malloy approved $2.75 million for the planning of a station in the East End of Bridgeport, Connecticut. The new station, was to be called Barnum after showman and former Bridgeport mayor P. T. Barnum, and was planned to open in 2021. The station would have had two island platforms, allowing for improved express service on the New Haven Line, increasing capacity. As of 2019, the project has been cancelled by the Connecticut DOT after determining they were not in the financial position to undertake the project.

==== Orange ====
After several years of contention, West Haven was chosen over Orange in December 2001 as the site for a new station, which opened in 2013. However, local advocates continued to push for an additional station in Orange. In July 2011, Governor Malloy signed a bill that sought a funding source, but that committed no funds to the project. On February 1, 2017, the Connecticut State Bond Commission authorized $21 million for design work for the station, in addition to funding for the upgrade of a station on the Danbury Branch. Design on the station began in January 2017, and construction of the station was to begin in spring 2019, before being completed in fall 2021. In November 2017, the Connecticut DOT announced that it would halt funding for the construction of Orange station and the accompanying transit-oriented development as the state was running out of funds for transportation projects.

==== Georgetown ====
In connection with the planned redevelopment of the Gilbert & Bennett Wire Mill as a residential neighborhood, reopening a Georgetown station on the Danbury Branch has been approved, though not yet scheduled or funded. The previous station was abandoned in the 1970s due to low ridership.

==== Wilbur Cross Parkway ====
The Waterbury and New Canaan Branch study also considered a new station on the Waterbury Branch as a park-and-ride station off the Wilbur Cross Parkway near where it meets the Merritt Parkway in Milford. The station was estimated to cost $41 million to construct.

=== Danbury Branch study ===
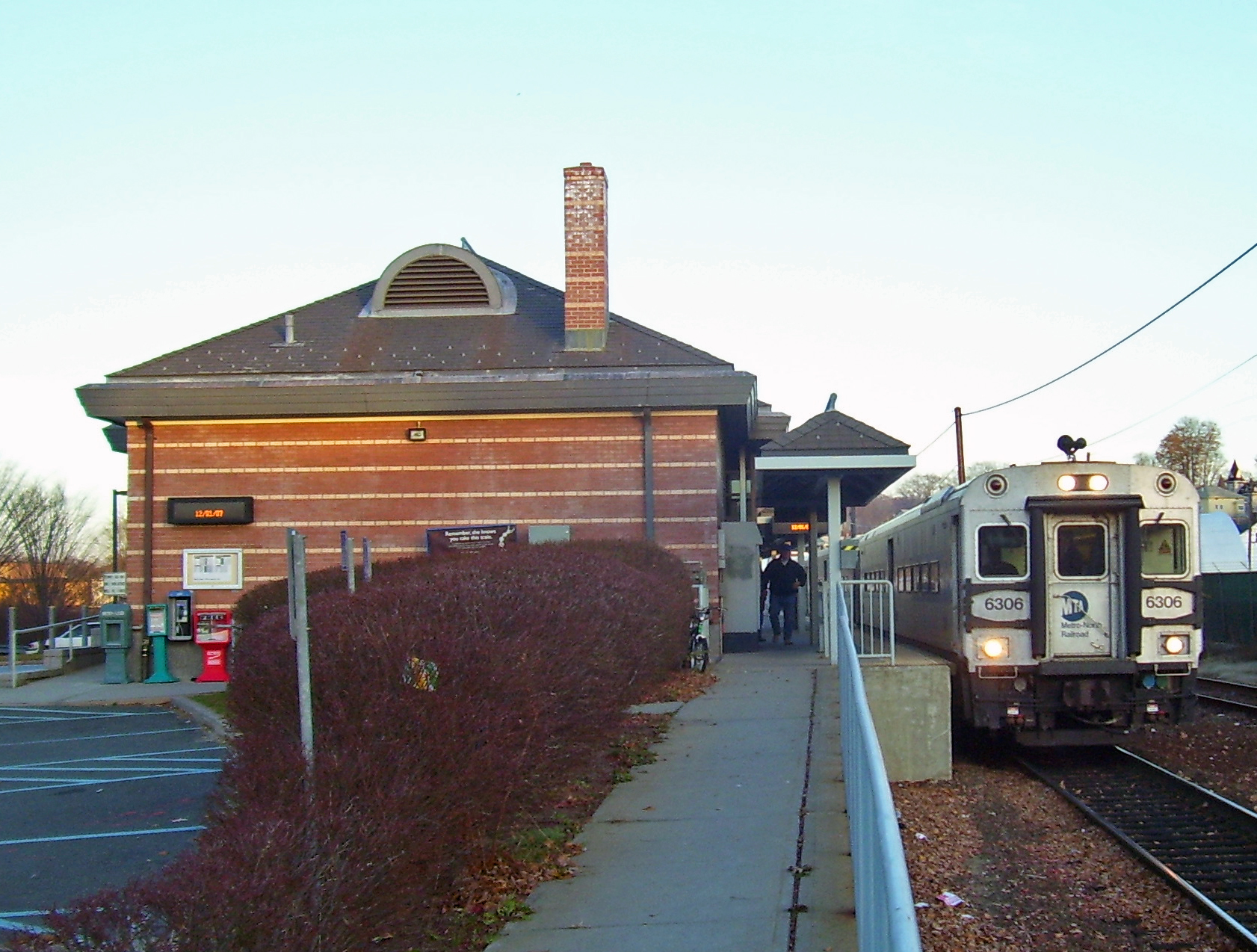
The Danbury Branch (which currently ends at Danbury) may be extended further north

Although not yet past the Draft Environment Impact Statement stage, a study of enhancing service on and extending the Danbury Branch would include additional stations in North Danbury (Federal Road), Brookfield, and New Milford. The draft EIS was due by 2010, and the final EIS by 2011. The Spring 2009 Update for the first time held out the possibility of extension all the way to Pittsfield, MA, the original route of the New Haven Berkshire Division. Trackage rights would have to be negotiated with the Housatonic Railroad, which owns the line beyond Danbury to New Milford.

Enhancements to the Danbury Branch being studied also include re-electrification of the branch (the branch was electrified from 1925 to 1961), addition of passing sidings, realignment and/or super-elevation of track to eliminate or alleviate curvature and enhance speeds, and installation of automated train control signalling. The new signal system finally began operation in 2013, but extensive work was still ongoing in 2014 because of unresolved problems with the drop gates at grade crossings.

Earlier versions of the study examined service to Newtown and Brewster along the Beacon/Maybrook line, as additional branches off the Danbury Branch. These options were not recommended due to limited ridership potential versus additional cost.

=== Penn Station Access ===
As part of the 2015–2019 MTA Capital Program, additional service from the New Haven Line will be provided to New York Penn Station over the Hell Gate Line of the Northeast Corridor, owned by Amtrak. Trackage rights and union agreements would have to be negotiated for this service. Commuter service over this line, formerly the Harlem River Branch of the predecessor New Haven, ended in 1931. New stations will be built at Hunts Point, Parkchester, Morris Park, and Co-op City.

This project was dormant from approximately 2002 to 2009, but an environmental assessment was announced by Metro-North and was to be completed by 2011. The study was in conjunction with ongoing studies for the best uses of Penn Station. The study advanced a single option of full (both peak and off-peak) service to Penn on the New Haven and Hudson Lines. However, the project was delayed. On January 8, 2014, New York Governor Andrew Cuomo voiced support for the project in his 2014 State of the State address.

In its 2015–2019 Capital Program, the MTA budgeted $695 million for New Haven Line Penn Station Access work, including track, structures, signal, power and communications work along the Hell Gate Line, specifications for rolling stock for the line, and construction of the four new stations. New track will be installed between the Parkchester/Van Nest station and north of the Co-op City station. Three bridges along the route will be rehabilitated or replaced. A groundbreaking ceremony for Penn Station Access took place in the Bronx on December 9, 2022.

Service is planned to begin in 2027 at the earliest. The opening of East Side Access in 2023 diverted some Long Island Rail Road trains to Grand Central Terminal, therefore opening up slots at Penn Station for Metro-North service. During peak hours there will be between six and ten trains to Penn Station. There will be four trains per hour to Connecticut in the reverse peak direction, and there will be two trains per hour to and from Penn Station during off-peak and weekends. In a limited form, it already takes place with the Jets/Giants game-day service to the Meadowlands, although it is not intended as service to Penn.

=== Waterbury–Bristol–New Britain–Hartford ===
As of February 2009, Connecticut legislators were discussing service on an old New Haven passenger line that ceased passenger service decades prior known as the Highland Line, part of the original New England Railroad, also known as the Central New England Railway, both eventual subsidiaries of The New York, New Haven and Hartford Railroad.

Currently, this is a freight-only line operated by Berkshire & Eastern. Station stops would include two in Bristol, as well as in New Britain, between Waterbury and Hartford. The next step is a preliminary scoping study, which would be followed by environmental studies. It is unknown if this will be a Metro-North extension of the Waterbury Branch.

=== Tappan Zee Bridge / I-287 Corridor ===
The New York State Department of Transportation, the New York State Thruway Authority, and Metro-North conducted extensive studies concerning the replacement of the deteriorated Tappan Zee Bridge. Proposals for rail connections to the New Haven Line were ultimately rejected as too expensive.
