= Housatonic River Railroad Bridge =

- Devon Bridge
- U.S. National Register of Historic Places
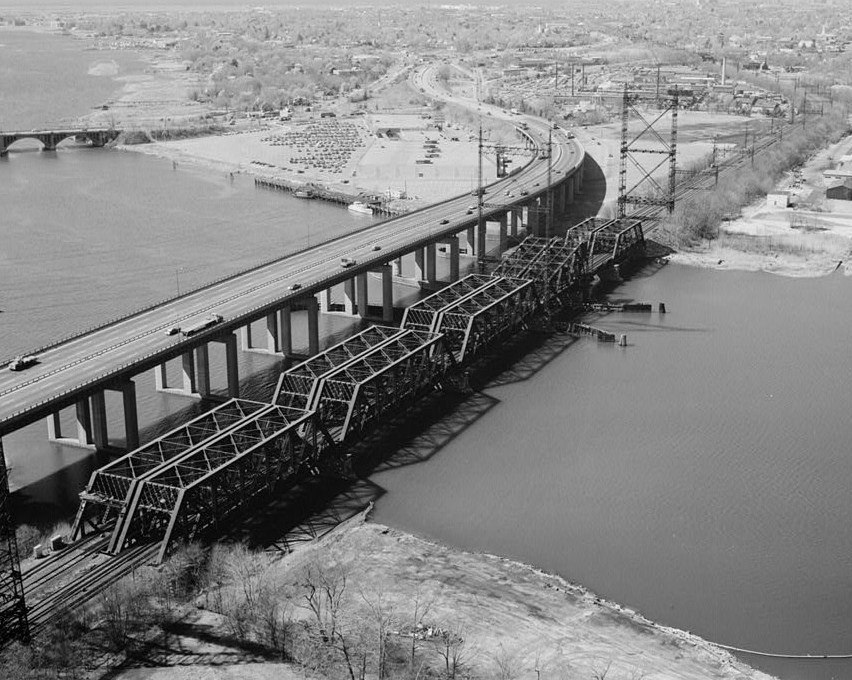
- The bridge in the 1980s
- Location: Milford and Stratford, Connecticut
- Coordinates: 41°12′19″N 73°6′37″W
- Area: 1 acre (0.40 ha)
- Built: 1906
- Architect: American Bridge Company
- Architectural style: Scherzer Rolling Lift Bascule
- MPS: Movable Railroad Bridges on the NE Corridor in Connecticut TR
- NRHP reference No.: 87000842
- Added to NRHP: June 12, 1987

The Housatonic River Railroad Bridge is a historic bridge carrying Metro-North Railroad's New Haven Line trackage across the lower Housatonic River in the U.S. state of Connecticut. The bridge is also used by Amtrak for its Northeast Corridor services. It was listed on the National Register of Historic Places in 1987, which also refers to the bridge as the Devon Bridge. It is also referred to as the Devon Railroad Bridge by the state Department of Environmental Protection.

It is a "Scherzer Rolling Lift Bascule"-type bascule bridge. It has a steel superstructure and block stone piers. The moveable span is a Warren through truss span.

== History ==
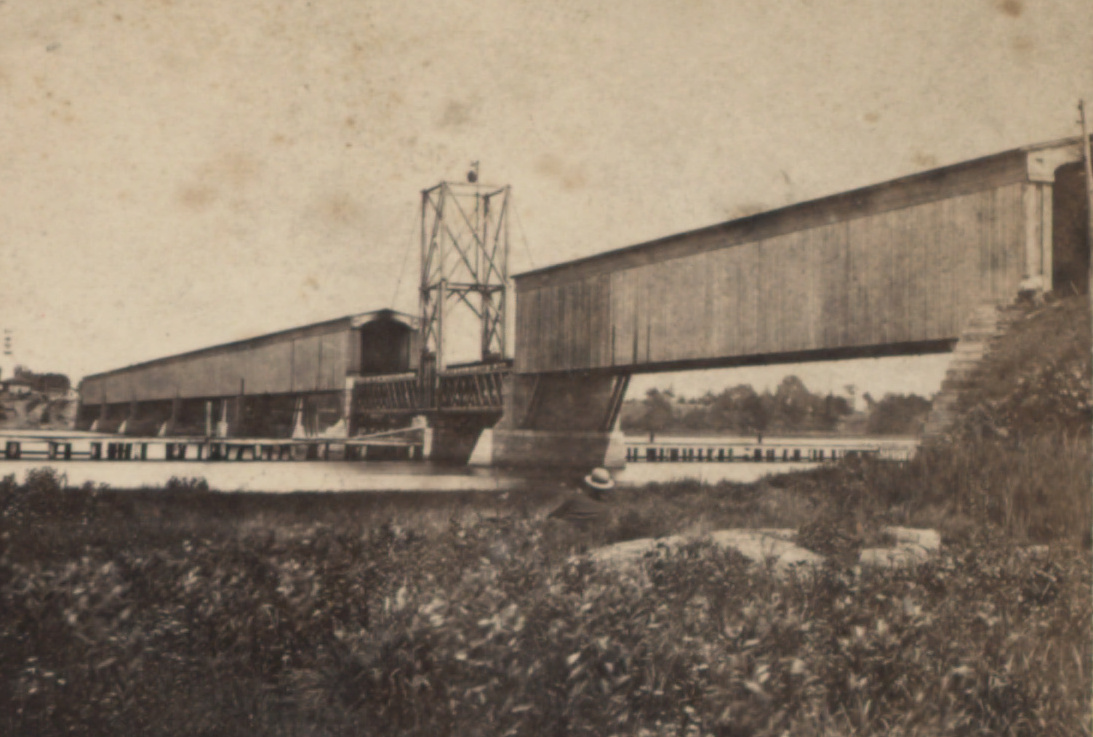
The original bridge in the 1860s

The current bridge is the fourth railroad span in the same location, originally known as Naugatuck Junction. The original bridge was the first railroad bridge over the Housatonic river, built by the New York and New Haven Railroad, and was a single-track wooden covered Howe truss, 1,293 feet (394 m) in length and a draw of 134 feet (41 m), built in 1848. It was the longest covered bridge ever built in the state of Connecticut. The second bridge was a double-track cast iron Whipple truss, 1,091 feet (333 m) in length and a draw of 206 feet (63 m), built in 1872 by the Keystone Bridge Company for the New York and New Haven Railroad. The third bridge was a double-track wrought iron Pratt truss, 1,091 feet (333 m) in length and a draw of 206 feet (63 m), built in 1884 by the New York, New Haven and Hartford Railroad. The current bridge, a four-track steel with Warren through truss spans, Scherzer Bascule bridge, 1,072 feet (327 m) in length and a draw of 110 feet (34 m), was completed in 1906 by the American Bridge Company for the New York, New Haven and Hartford Railroad. Its completion finished the quadruple-tracking of the New Haven mainline from Woodlawn Junction to New Haven.

Repairs were planned for six months starting April 25, 2015.

=== Replacement ===
Amtrak was awarded up to $246 million in Infrastructure Investment and Jobs Act funds in November 2023 for design of a replacement for the span. Amtrak will contribute an additional $16 million, while the state of Connecticut will provide $45 million. Up to an additional $119 million was awarded for interim repairs to the bridge. The replacement bridge is being designed for a top speed of 70 mph (110 km/h), up from the current 40 mph (64 km/h) limit on the existing bridge.

== See also ==
- National Register of Historic Places listings in Fairfield County, Connecticut
- List of bridges on the National Register of Historic Places in Connecticut
