= Stratford station (Connecticut) =

Railroad station in Connecticut

Stratford
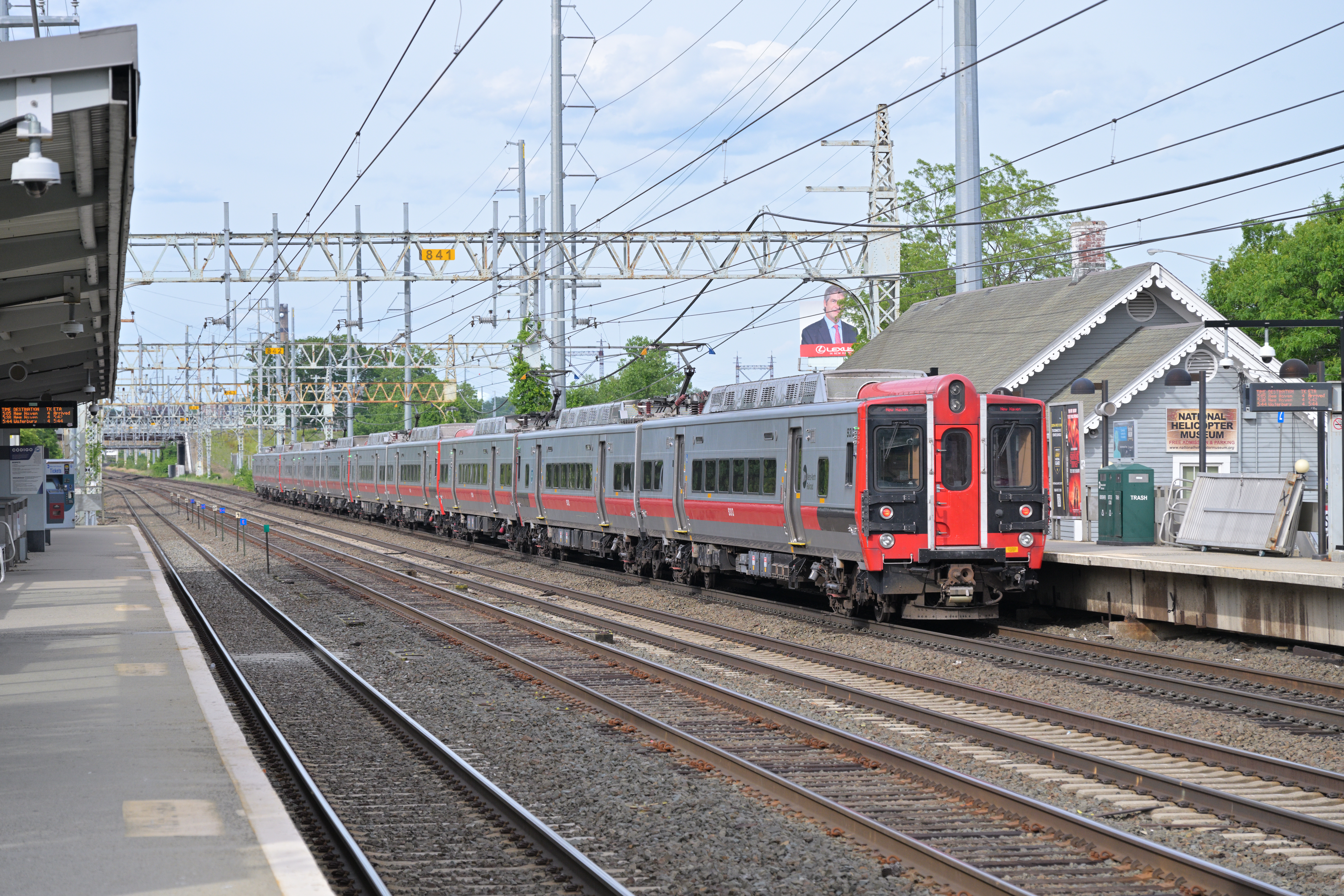
- An eastbound New Haven Line train at Stratford in 2026

General information
- Location: 2480 Main Street; Stratford, Connecticut
- Coordinates: 41.1948°N 73.1307°W
- Owner: ConnDOT
- Line: ConnDOT New Haven Line (Northeast Corridor)
- Platforms: 2 side platforms
- Tracks: 4
- Connections: Greater Bridgeport Transit Authority: 1, 10, 16, 23, Coastal Link

Construction
- Parking: 294 spaces

Other information
- Fare zone: 20 (Metro-North)

History
- Opened: December 25, 1848

Passengers
- 2018: 1,658 daily boardings

Services
Preceding station	CT Rail	Following station
Bridgeport toward Stamford	Shore Line East limited weekday service	Milford toward New London
Preceding station	Metro-North Railroad	Following station
Bridgeport toward Grand Central	New Haven Line	Milford toward New Haven or New Haven State Street
Bridgeport Terminus	Waterbury Branch weekday service	Derby–Shelton toward Waterbury
Former services
Preceding station	New York, New Haven and Hartford Railroad	Following station
Bridgeport toward New York	Main Line	Devon toward New Haven
Location

Stratford station is a commuter rail station on the Northeast Corridor in Stratford, Connecticut. It is served by the Metro-North Railroad New Haven Line plus limited CT Rail Shore Line East service. The station has two high-level side platforms, each four cars long, serving the four tracks of the Northeast Corridor. The station has 294 parking spaces, which are all owned by the state.

== History ==
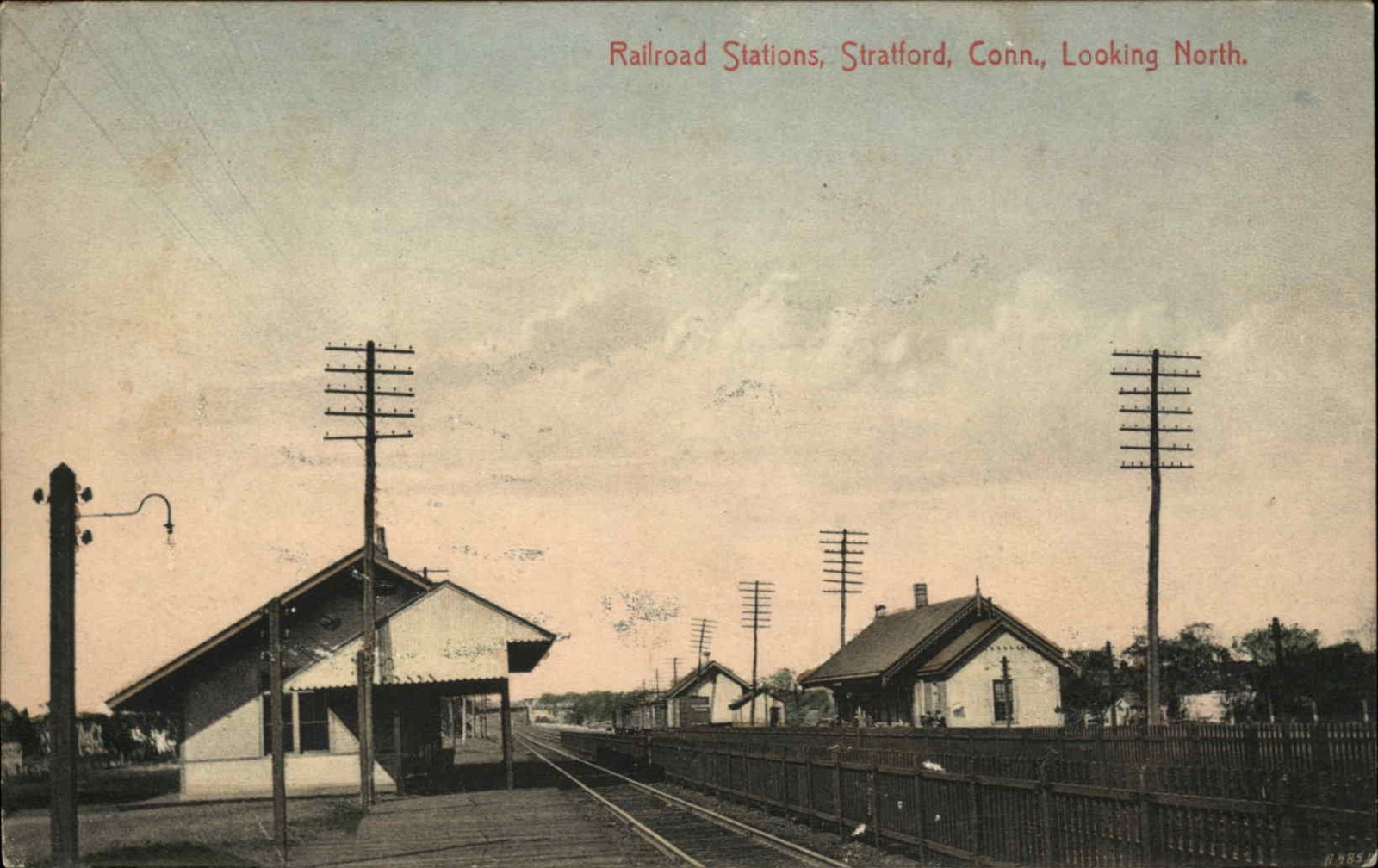
1908 postcard of the station

The station opened on December 25, 1848. The first station building was constructed in 1849. A new station was built between 1853 and 1880; the older structure became a freight house and is no longer extant. The station building was moved east around 1894 when the line was quadruple-tracked, and a second building was added on the north (westbound) side. The buildings closed to passengers in 1973; the National Helicopter Museum opened in the eastbound (south) station building in 1983.

Shore Line East service at Stratford was suspended indefinitely on March 16, 2020 due to the COVID-19 pandemic, while Waterbury Branch service was suspended indefinitely on April 6 due to a signalization project. Waterbury Branch service resumed on October 26, 2020, and Shore Line East service resumed on October 7, 2024.
