= Ritz Ballroom, Bridgeport =

Nightclub in Bridgeport, Connecticut, US

Coordinates: 41.1553°N 73.2327°W

Ritz Ballroom
- Interactive map of Ritz Ballroom
- Address: Fairfield Avenue
- Location: Bridgeport, CT
- Capacity: 1,724

Construction
- Opened: March 23, 1923
- Closed: January 1, 1962
- Demolished: June 12, 1970

The Ritz Ballroom was a popular cabaret, jazz, and swing nightclub located in the Black Rock neighborhood of Bridgeport, Connecticut near Ash Creek.

== History ==
The ballroom opened on March 23, 1923, under the management of owners Joe Barry and George McCormack. The final event held was the New Year's Eve Dance on December 31, 1961. After it was closed on January 1, 1962, the building became a furniture store but was then completely destroyed by a fire on June 12, 1970.

== Building ==
The ballroom was located on Fairfield Avenue near Davidson Street and Courtland Avenue. The wood for the dance floor was originally the ice skating rink at the Parlor Rock Amusement Park in Trumbull, which had been moved to the Brooklawn Pavilion, another hall owned by Barry and McCormack. The hall set a record attendance of 1,724 people in 1943 for a Stan Kenton show, and again that same year with a similar sized crowd for Duke Ellington; a ticket was priced at $0.88. However, in 1950 a one-night event with big band leader Ralph Flanagan drew 3,054 people at $1.50 a ticket.

== Notable events ==
A variety of musical artists played the ballroom throughout its existence, including Les Brown, Frankie Carle, Guy Lombardo, George Shearing, and Frank Sinatra as well as Bing Crosby, Connie Haines, Frankie Laine and Artie Shaw. The hall was also often used for formal functions, such as the farewell dinner honoring Clare Boothe Luce on April 10, 1953, before she took up her post in Rome as United States Ambassador to Italy.

=== Glenn Miller ===
On January 2, 1938, the final show of Glenn Miller's first band was held at the Ritz. Miller would then go on to form the Glenn Miller Orchestra.

=== Bunny Berigan ===
In January 1939, jazz musician Bunny Berigan was famously charged $117 by the city of Bridgeport for permission to play the ballroom after missing a concert at the city's Pleasure Beach Ballroom.

=== Famous cancellation ===
A dance scheduled for May 22, 1955, featuring Fats Domino was cancelled by the Bridgeport Police Department, citing worries about rock and roll music and a recent near riot at the New Haven Arena.

== Tributes ==
WVOF hosts a weekly radio show featuring music, commentaries and interviews from the venue. Host Jeffrey Williams has also written a book, "Home of Happy Dancers" - The Story of Bridgeport, Connecticut's Ritz Ballroom, on the venue, and declared 2011 the "Year of the Ritz" in honor of its being 50 years since it closed. A "Ritz Supper Club" featuring big band music and jazz still plays local venues as of December 2011.

== Sources ==
- Jeffrey C. Williams. "Home of Happy Dancers": The Story of Bridgeport, Connecticut's Ritz Ballroom. Virginia Beach, Virginia: Donning, 2011. ISBN 978-1-57864-722-4
