= Burning of Fairfield (1779) =

American Revolutionary War action in CT

- Part of the American Revolutionary War and Tryon's raid
Date	July 7–8, 1779
Location	Fairfield, Connecticut; Present-day Bridgeport, Connecticut; Present-day Westport, Connecticut
Result	British tactical victory Near total destruction of Fairfield

Belligerents
United States	Great Britain

Commanders and leaders
Col. Samuel Whiting; Lt. Isaac Jarvis	Maj. Gen. William Tryon; Brig. Gen. George Garth; Cmdre. George Collier

Strength
4th Regiment of Connecticut Militia	800 (Tryon's initial force); 1,700 (Garth's reinforcements)

Casualties and losses
10 Killed; 2 Wounded; 6 Captured	11 Killed; 44 Wounded; 6 MIA

The Burning of Fairfield refers to the action of the American Revolutionary War at Fairfield, Connecticut on July 7, 1779 after a British landing force under the command of General William Tryon attacked the town, engaged and dispersed its militia forces, and burned down the vast majority of its buildings. Much of the action took place in areas that are now part of Bridgeport, Southport, and Westport.

== Background ==
The attack was the second stop along Tryon's raid of Connecticut's rebellious coastline, in which 2,600 regulars launched a punitive campaign on Fairfield and New Haven from their base in Long Island.

The raid was actually Tryon's second on Fairfield County, after his near identical 1777 landings at Compo Beach leading to the destruction of Continental supplies at Danbury and a major showdown at Ridgefield with David Wooster, Benedict Arnold and 700 Connecticut militiamen, including many from Fairfield. Present-day Fairfield had been spared action in that raid as the action happened to its west in what is now Westport.

Until recently, the defense of southwestern Connecticut had been the domain of Brig. Gen. Gold Selleck Silliman. But, in May of 1779, two months before Tryon's second raid, Silliman was kidnapped from his Fairfield home by a band of tories and taken to Oyster Bay, New York as prisoner. Silliman's house on Jennings Road is one of the few left standing in Fairfield today. In the months leading up to the raid, Fairfield had developed a reputation for providing materiel and personnel to the continental war effort, with a great many privateers passing through Black Rock Harbor.

On July 5, 1779, the British landed at New Haven, raided the town and the nearby Black Rock Fort, and then returned to Long Island. Gen. Garth was able to spare the town from burning in spite of Tryon's orders to the contrary.

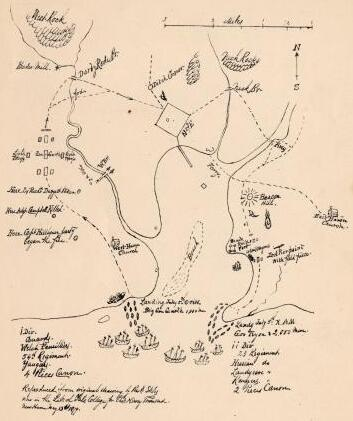
Hand-drawn map by Ezra Stiles showing the British movements at New Haven on July 5, two days prior to the attack on Fairfield. .

== Attack ==
Tryon's raiding force left their base in Huntington in the morning hours of July 7. Soon after, the British flotilla was spotted by militia forces at a (now submerged) fort at Grover's Point in Black Rock Harbor. The town was alerted and most unarmed civilians fled inland. Tryon and his initial landing force of 800 infantry landed on present-day South Pine Creek beach in the afternoon and marched inland towards the town center. Tryon's force was of extremely high fighting quality, consisting of "two bodies of Fusileers, the Guards, the Fifty-fourth regiment of foot and the King’s American (loyalist) regiment.” The American forces amounted to scattered elements of the 4th Connecticut Militia and Lt. Isaac Jarvis's guns at Grover's Point in present-day Bridgeport. Tryon's force disembarked under harassing fire from Jarvis's guns before meeting a party of the town's most influential residents. The British sent Parson Sayre, the town's Presbyterian minister, to the town's militia with an entreaty to surrender. A militia Col. Samuel Whiting responded in the negative.

Tryon's force captured and began to sack Fairfield, with a westerly detachment doing the same to the village of Greens Farms in present-day Westport. Whiting's militia forces harassed the invaders and briefly held them up at Round Hill (near the present site of Fairfield University), but ultimately withdrew on the first day of fighting. Their most important delaying action was the burning of the bridge at Ash Creek, which made it impossible for Tryon plan to combine his two detachments and take Jarvis's fort at Black Rock Harbor. Tryon's frustration at this foiling of his plan is cited by period sources as his motivation for allowing the burning of the town the next day. Throughout the night of July 7, Jarvis and his 23 men traded fire with the British flotilla. Tryon sent multiple detachments to capture the fort, but those attacks were repulsed at some cost. Thus the small fort, and Black Rock Harbor, survived the raid.

After the initial attack on the town, Tryon's forces had been reinforced by 1,700 men including many German jägers and commanded by General George Garth. This force landed "near Mill River", presumably near present-day downtown Southport, Connecticut and marched up Sasco Hill toward Tryon's force. Much of the town was, at first, spared burning. However, the next day, July 8, the British withdrew to their beachhead with the Germans acting as their rear guard. As the furious townsfolk bore down on them, the nervous jägers began to burn the town wholesale on their way back to their boats. The town's Congregational minister Rev. Andrew Eliot, who was present among the rebels, later recalled the Germans as "the vilest [soldiers] ever let loose among men". Notably, the original 1732 Burr Homestead, site of John Hancock's wedding and property of Thaddeus Burr, uncle of Aaron Burr, was also burned despite Tryon's written assurances to Burr's wife.

== Commemoration ==
Fairfield eventually recovered and has experienced many booms in population and prosperity owing to its easy connections to New York City. However, for many years after the British attack the town served as perhaps the most visible reminder of the price Connecticut paid in the war. In 1789 President George Washington visited Penfield's Sun Tavern and remarked that “The destructive evidences of British cruelty are yet visible both in Norwalk and Fairfield; as there are the chimneys of many burnt houses standing in them yet." As Washington alluded to, Norwalk was the next target in Tryon's raid after Fairfield and suffered a similar fate.

Each year volunteers stage re-creations and guided tours centering on the movements of the British on that day and the few colonial houses which survived the flames.
