= Rebecca Pratt =

American radio broadcaster (1967–2022)

Rebecca Pratt (March 10, 1967 – December 29, 2022) was an American radio broadcaster. A transgender woman, Pratt was well known professionally as John Osterlind.

== Biography ==
Pratt was born in Norwalk, Connecticut, on March 10, 1967. She graduated from Roger Ludlowe High School in Fairfield, Connecticut, in 1985 and from Dean Junior College in Franklin, Massachusetts, in 1987, where she was on their college station 88.3 FM WGAO. She was on air overnights on then classic rock station 103.7 FM WWRX in Providence, Rhode Island, from 1987 to 1988. She was on air in evenings and afternoons on rock station WCCC-FM in Hartford, Connecticut, from 1989 to 1992, in evenings on rock station WAAF FM in Boston, Massachusetts, from 1992 to 1994 and from 1994 to 2001, music director and midday jock on WAAF. She was morning co-host on WRKO AM in Boston with former Massachusetts Congressman Peter Blute from 2001 to 2003. Until the evening of January 7, 2015, she was the successful evening talk host on WRNO FM in New Orleans, Louisiana. Following her firing, her New Orleans fans organized a protest against WRNO which was themed according to the fictitious non-profit "Pencils for Poor People", which Pratt and her producer James Parker created as one of the many running gags on the John Osterlind Show. On November 2, 2015, Pratt began broadcasting mid-days on WGSO 990 AM in New Orleans after leaving WGSO she hosted the morning drive time show on 95.7 FM BAYOU and eventually was replaced by a syndicated show The Rise Guys. At the time of her death in 2022, she was not hosting any radio shows.

Pratt was found dead at her home on December 29, 2022, at the age of 55.
