= JRB =

JRB may refer to:

- Joseph Robinette Biden Jr. (born 1942), 46th president of the United States (2021–2025)
- Joseph Robinette Biden Sr. (1915–2002), father of Joe Biden
- Joseph Robinette "Beau" Biden III (1969–2015), eldest son of Joe Biden
- Downtown Manhattan Heliport (IATA code: JRB), Lower Manhattan, New York City, New York, U.S.
- ISO 639:jrb or Judeo-Arabic languages, a continuum of specifically Jewish varieties of Arabic
- James River Bridge, the James River Bridge in Newport News, Virginia
- Jatiya Rakkhi Bahini, a Bangladeshi para-military force
- Juvenile Review Board, reviews juvenile court cases, Connecticut, U.S.
- Jean-Robert Bellande (born 1970), poker player, U.S.
- Jason Robert Brown, American composer, lyricist, and playwright.
