= Black Rock Congregational Church =

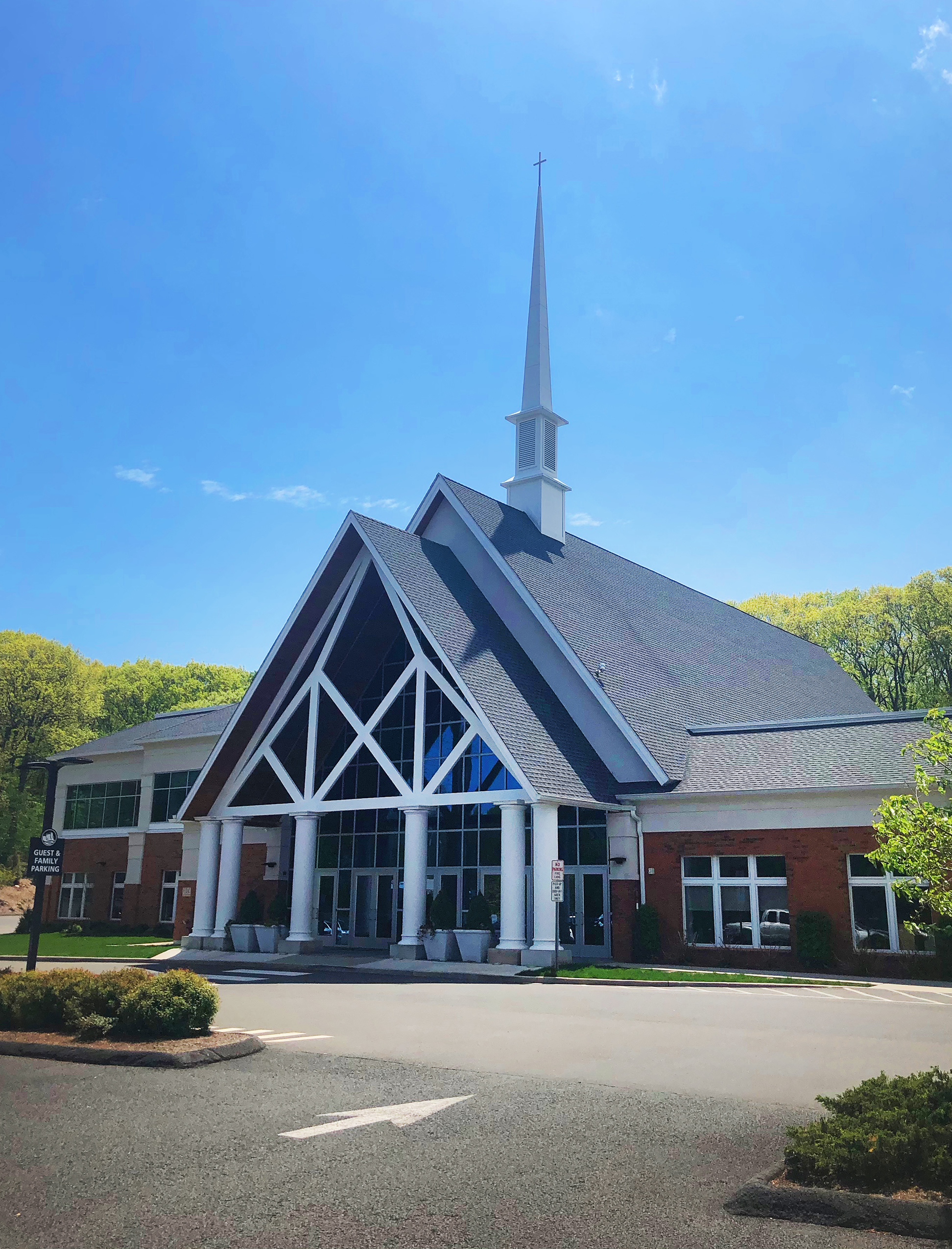
- Black Rock Church.
- Black Rock Congregational Church
- 41.198025°N 73.267696°W
- Address: Fairfield, Connecticut
- Country: United States
- Denomination: non-denominational
- Website: www.blackrock.org

History
- Founded: 1849

Black Rock Church is a non-denominational church located in Fairfield, Connecticut. The church was established in 1849 in the Black Rock section of Bridgeport, Connecticut, and moved to its current site in 1968. Approximately 4000 adults and children attend the church's four weekend services.

== History ==
In the late 1840s, a group of villagers of the Black Rock section of Fairfield, Connecticut, (later to become a part of the city of Bridgeport) parishioners of the First Church of Christ in Fairfield, Connecticut, decided that they would build a new meeting house in Black Rock, rather than continue the challenging three-mile weekly trip across the creek and marshland that separated the two sections of the town. A new church was established, and its meeting house was dedicated in August 1849 at the corner of Ellsworth St. and Bartram Ave.

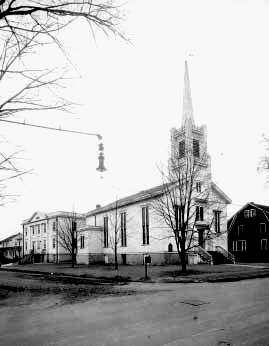
The original church building in Black Rock, with Woodruff Hall in the rear of the building.

William Jessup Jennings served as the church's first minister. The church grew modestly through the middle of 19th century under the leadership of ministers Rev. Marinus Willett, Abram D. Baldwin, Rev. Frederick W. Williams, and Rev. Howard W. Pope. In 1881, the Rev. Henry Collins Woodruff accepted the pastorate of the church and served for 41 years, until his death in 1922. During Woodruff's tenure, a chapel was built, and upon his death, a memorial hall named for him was donated by his wife, Mary Bartram Woodruff.

The church's next pastor was Rev. Charles Haddon Spurgeon MacDowell, who introduced a new evangelical direction for the church, encouraging Bible study groups and attendance at Bible conferences and camps. MacDowell served for 21 years. In 1945, the church severed ties to the formal Congregational denomination, making Black Rock a free and independent community of believers. During this time, the church was served briefly by Reverend Leonard S. Pitcher, Dr. Howard Z. Cleveland, and Interim Pastor Reverend Harry L. Cox, who was the first missionary that the church had supported. It was also during this time the church's steeple was blown off, crashing into the roof during a strong hurricane.

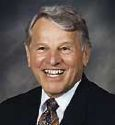
Dr. Stanley R. Allaby

In 1956, Dr. Stanley R. Allaby became pastor and began a 41-year tenure, under which the church experienced extensive growth. The church's missions program was developed further, supporting a number of missionaries financially and prayerfully with great concern. The missions program was highlighted each year with its annual Missions Conference, beginning in 1958 and continuing to this day.

It was during this time the church's attendance began to increase. As the church grew in number under the leadership of Pastor Allaby, the original church building became increasingly inadequate in size. Multiple plans for building a new church facility in Black Rock were formulated and later rejected. The church then turned to the town of Fairfield, where a six-acre piece of property was purchased adjacent to Black Rock Turnpike. The church broke ground for a new facility in 1967, and the building was dedicated the following year. The facility was later expanded and renovated as the church continued to grow into the 1980s and 90s. Under Pastor Allaby, the church's membership grew to over 800 people.

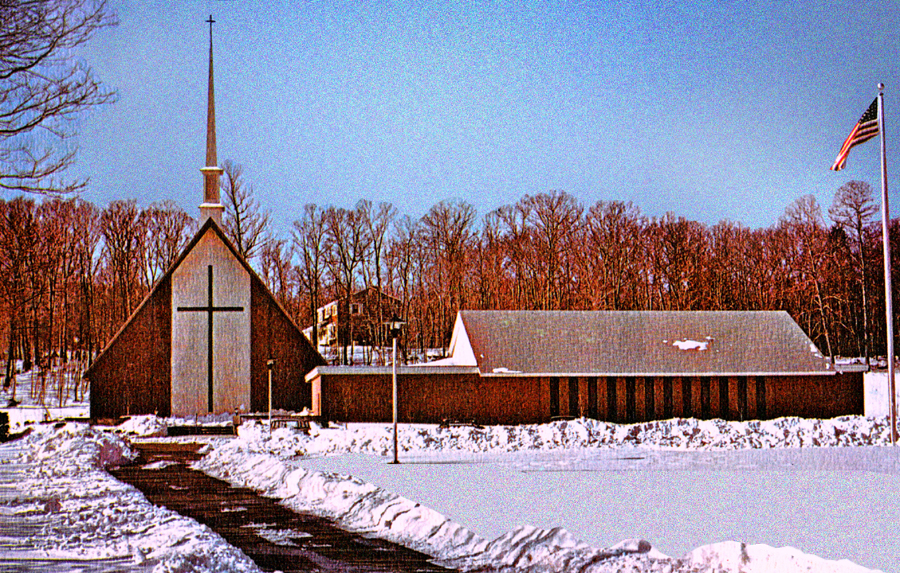
The second church facility on Black Rock Turnpike.

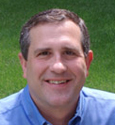
Dr. Stephen A. Treash

Dr. Stephen A. Treash, Associate Pastor under Pastor Allaby, accepted the senior pastorate in 1997, and served until 2024. Under Pastor Treash's leadership, the church expanded the number of services to reach out to those in the community who may not normally be drawn to a traditional church, particularly young adults. The church retains a traditional worship service, but also offers services of contemporary worship and a special "next generation" format service called "Sanctuary."

In the early 21st century, the church again found itself having outgrown its existing church facility. The church elders instituted the "Ministry Expansion Program," which sought a number of solutions to the problem. Additional services were again added, and the church was given the facilities of the Long Ridge Congregational Church in Stamford, Connecticut, where a temporary satellite campus was established in 2007. The expansion team formulated extensive plans to replace the current facility on the same site in Fairfield, which were denied upon submission by the town of Fairfield's Conservation Commission due to concerns over environmental impact. After the denial, new plans were drawn up with a reduced size building which would be situated exactly where the existing church is located in order to minimize environmental impact. The church received final approvals for these new plans in 2011 and broke ground in October 2012. After a 20-month construction period, the church dedicated its third building on June 15, 2014. After opening, the new facility became host to widely known Christian recording artists such as Lincoln Brewster, Jeremy Camp, Rend Collective, Kutless, Bethel Music, Stephen Curtis Chapman and Seattle-based pastor, Judah Smith. In 2016, the church's members voted to change the church's public name to, "Black Rock Church," deleting the word, "Congregational," to avoid any perceptions of association with other local Congregational churches. The full, historical name will be retained officially in the church's constitution and bylaws.

In 2024, Executive Pastor Josh Feay was nominated by the Elders Board to become the church's tenth Senior Pastor upon the announcement of Steve Treash's resignation after 40 years as Senior Pastor and Associate Pastor. Feay was elected by congregational vote in October, 2024 and installed in November of the same year.
