= Fairfield Ludlowe High School =

Coordinates: 41.1497°N 73.2634°W

Location
- 785 Unquowa Road; Fairfield, Connecticut 06824; United States

Information
- Type: Public
- Established: 2003 (23 years ago)
- School district: Fairfield Public Schools
- CEEB code: 070187
- Headmaster: Greg Hatzis
- Grades: 9–12
- Enrollment: 1,489 (2023-2024)
- Colors: Blue and silver
- Slogan: Fellowship, Acceptance, Learning, Commitment, Opportunity, Niche, Success
- Mascot: Falcon
- Newspaper: Prospect
- Yearbook: Caelum
- Year-round schedule: No
- Website: flhs.fairfieldschools.org

Fairfield Ludlowe High School (FLHS) is a co-educational secondary school located in Fairfield, Connecticut, United States.

Before Roger Ludlowe Middle School opened up on campus in 2003, Fairfield Ludlowe High School served as the middle school when the middle school students went to Fairfield Warde High School. FLHS was reopened as a high school in fall 2003 because of overcrowding at Fairfield's one existing high school, now called Fairfield Warde High School. The school was originally opened as "Fairfield High School at the Ludlowe Site," as a satellite campus of Fairfield High School housing 9th and 10th grades. In Fall 2003, The Board of Education decided that it would be called Fairfield High School South, while the existing high school would be called Fairfield High School East. The board, under the direction of president Grace Easterby, claimed that they voted for these names to minimize rivalry between the schools. Several months later, after much persuasion, the board voted to change the name of the two schools to Fairfield Ludlowe and Fairfield Warde, keeping the names from before the 1987 consolidation but also maintaining the reputation of the Fairfield name.

== Accolades ==
Fairfield Ludlowe High School's drama club was the first educational institution to perform Wilder's The Bridge of San Luis Rey.

== Notable alumni ==
- Franco Ventriglia (1941), opera singer
- Dave Graham (1957), NFL player
- Fran Lynch (1963), NFL player
- James Murren (1979), former CEO of MGM Resorts International
- Bob Eick (1980), movie producer
- Charles Nagy (1985), MLB All-Star pitcher
- Rebecca Pratt (1985), radio broadcaster
- Julie Benko (2007), actress
- Brad Baylor (2022), professional wrestler, WWE
