= Education in Fairfield, Connecticut =

Fairfield, Connecticut has a total of 16 public schools. There is a total of seven private elementary schools, two private high schools, and two private universities located in Fairfield.

== Fairfield public schools ==
Fairfield's public schools are governed by a large administrative body, as well as a nine-member elected Board of Education.

=== Elementary schools ===
- Burr Elementary School - Established 2004
- Holland Hill School
- Jennings School - Established 1967
- McKinley School
- Mill Hill School - Established 1956, Reopened 1991
- North Stratfield School
- Osborn Hill School - Established 1957, Closed 1981, Reopened 1997.
- Riverfield School - Established 1962
- Roger Sherman School
- Stratfield School
- Timothy Dwight School

=== Middle schools ===
- Fairfield Woods Middle School - Established 1955 as Fairfield Woods School
- Roger Ludlowe Middle School - Established 1998
- Tomlinson Middle School

=== High schools ===
- Fairfield Ludlowe High School - Roger Ludlowe Senior High School Closed 1987, Reopened 2003 as FLHS
- Fairfield Warde High School - Established 1956 as Andrew Warde Senior High School

== Private and parochial schools ==
=== Primary schools ===
- Eagle Hill - Southport
- Fairfield Country Day School
- Hillel Academy
- Holy Family School - closed by the Diocese of Bridgeport at the end of the 2009-2010 academic year
- Our Lady of the Assumption School
- Pear Tree Point School
- St. Thomas Aquinas Catholic School
- The Unquowa School

=== Secondary schools ===
- Fairfield College Preparatory School, located on the campus of Fairfield University
- Notre Dame Catholic High School

== Universities ==
- Fairfield University
- Sacred Heart University

== History ==
In 1695, Fairfield opened its first grammar school. In 1712, the Connecticut General Assembly, ordered that the town's schools should be transferred over to the town's church parishes, besides the town's grammar school. In 1795, there was a new regulation regarding the creation of four school societies to operate the schools. These were the Village of Fairfield School Society, the Greenfield School Society, the Green's Farms School Society and the Stratfield School Society. Fairfield's first unified school district was created in 1887, when there was a merger of individual districts.

The limited in-person instruction and online education during the COVID-19 pandemic in Connecticut prompted some parents in the Farfield school district, along with some parents in other school districts, to switch to private schools with full in-person education and/or homeschooling.
