= Rooster River =

River in the United States of America

Coordinates: 41.1938°N 73.2327°W

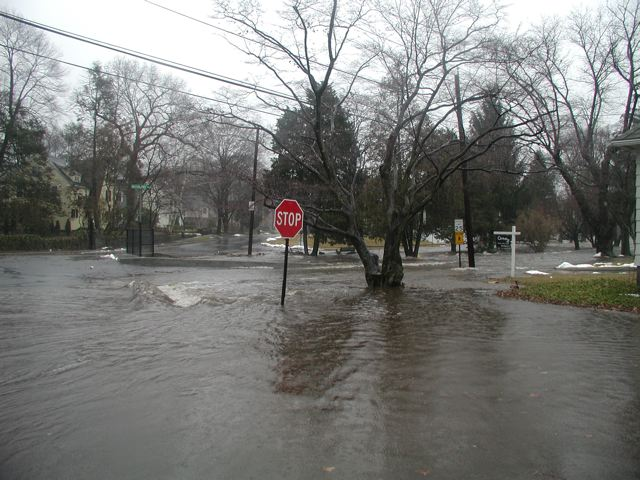
Rooster River aka Horse Tavern Brook flooding.

Rooster River is a river in Fairfield County, Connecticut that lies on and serves as the border between Bridgeport and Fairfield. It has flooded on numerous occasions and so has its own flood control project.

The river's watershed is 15.3 square miles. Its headwater is heavily urbanized; in addition to Bridgeport and Fairfield, it also runs through Trumbull. Rooster River extends southward into Long Island Sound by way of the Ash Creek Estuary. The source of the river is Lake Forest in Bridgeport, Horse Tavern Brook in Trumbull, and London's Brook from the Fairchild Wheeler golf course. For a short distance upstream from the junction with London's Brook (which is adjacent to Unquowa School) into Bridgeport both 'Horse Tavern Brook' and 'Rooster River' have been interchangeably used. Similarly, the river is called Ash Creek locally where the river is influenced by the tide.

== See also ==
- List of rivers of Connecticut
