= Black Rock, Bridgeport =

Neighborhood of Bridgeport, Connecticut, United States

Coordinates: 41°09′31″N 73°13′31″W

Black Rock
- Neighborhood of Bridgeport
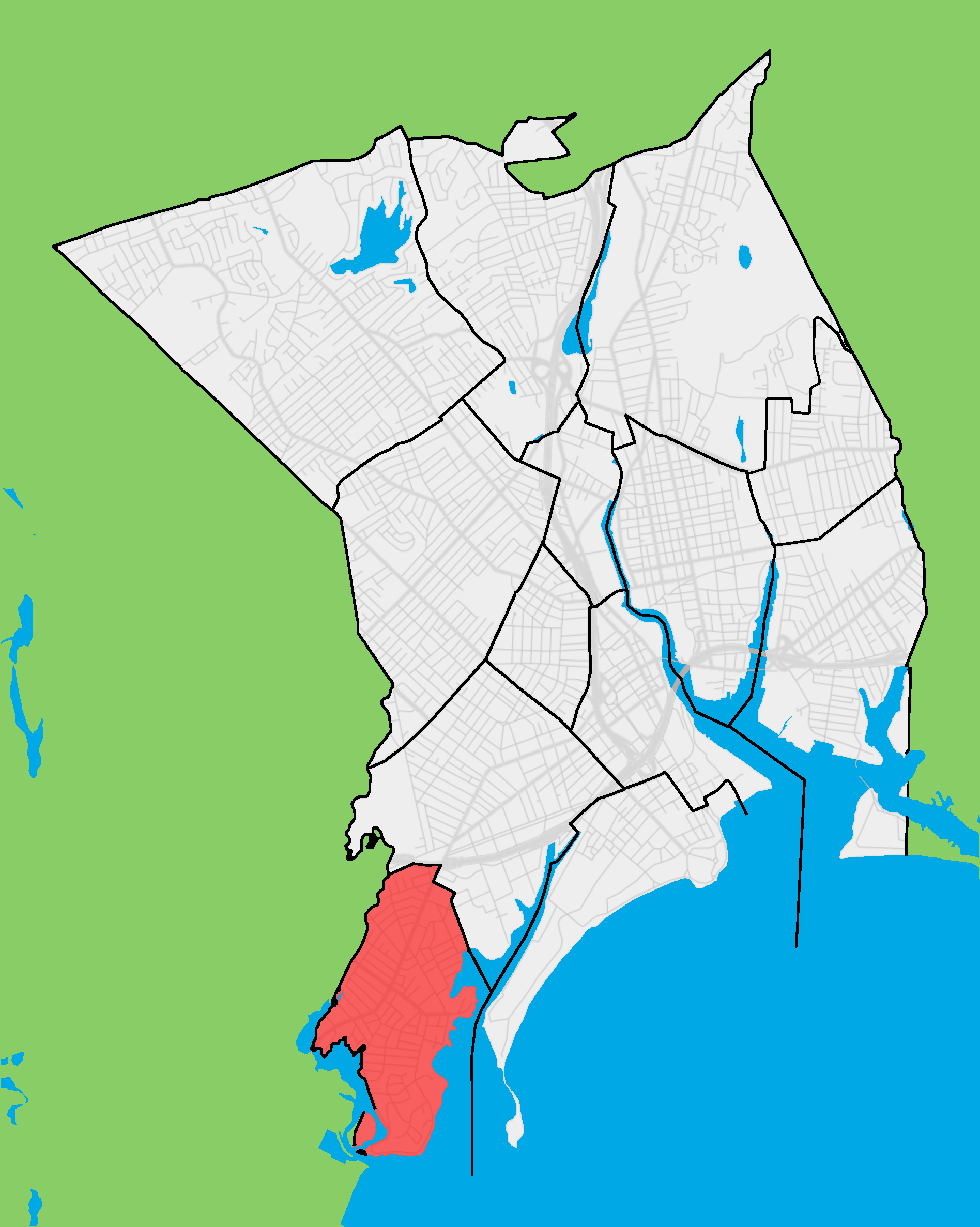
- Location in Bridgeport
- Municipal: City of Bridgeport
- NECTA: Bridgeport-Stamford
- Region: Greater Bridgeport
- County: Fairfield County
- Settled: 1644

Population (2006)
  - Total: 9,979
- Time zone: UTC−5 (Eastern)
  - Summer (DST): UTC−4 (Eastern)
- ZIP code: 06605
- Area code: 203
- FIPS code: 09-08000
- GNIS feature ID: 0205720

Black Rock is a neighborhood in the southwestern section of the city of Bridgeport, Connecticut. It borders Fairfield and the Ash Creek tidal estuary on the west, the West Side/West End of Bridgeport on the north and east, and Black Rock Harbor and Long Island Sound on the south. Black Rock comprises census tracts 701 and 702 and part of census tract 703. It includes two historic districts listed on the National Register of Historic Places. Residences comprise 86% of properties in Black Rock, 10% are commercial, and 4% are industrial or other property classes.

== History ==
Black Rock was first settled in 1644 by a group of settlers led by Thomas Wheeler. The region was also inhabited by Native Americans, who relinquished their settlement in the area in 1681.

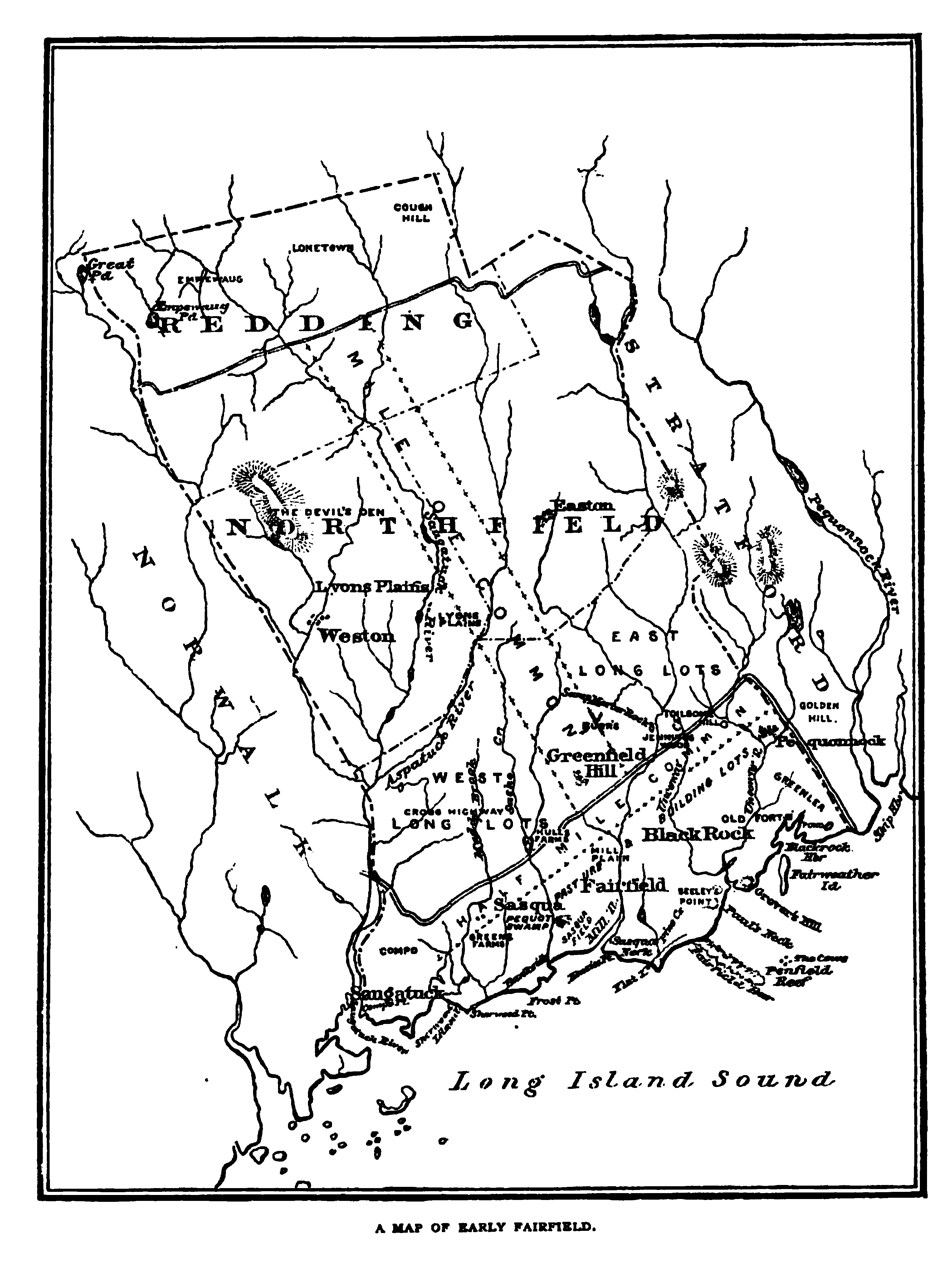
Early Map of Fairfield and Black Rock - Before the settlement of Bridgeport.

During the early days of Black Rock, the area was also the community of Stratfield, which has also been absorbed into modern Bridgeport. Stratfield was originally known as Pequonnock and was located about midway between Black Rock and the original settlement of Bridgeport. The cemetery known as Stratfield Burying Place is located here and has many of Black Rock's early settlers interred there.

In 1653, Goodwife Knapp was executed for witchcraft in a field in Fairfield; today, the field is located within the limits of Black Rock, with a community centre built on its site.

Black Rock was incorporated into Bridgeport in 1870.

In the late 19th century and early 20th century, wealthy merchants built homes in Black Rock in an array of different architectural styles, including Mediterranean Revival and Tudor Revival. One of these homes, with 3 acres (12,000 m^{2}) of land and 16 rooms ("The Chimneys"), is located on Old Battery Road. The S. S. Norden Club is a private club founded in 1902, the first of a number of private clubs in the neighborhood.

A Carnegie Library was built in the neighborhood in 1932, which would later become the Black Rock Branch Library, a branch of the Bridgeport Public Library system.

=== Historic districts ===
There are two historic districts in the neighborhood that have been listed on the National Register of Historic Places. The Black Rock Historic District was created on March 15, 1979, and comprises a number of houses and other structures from the mid 18th Century through the late 19th Century. The other historic district is the Black Rock Gardens Historic District, created on September 26, 1990. The district comprises 7 acres of emergency housing built for workers during World War I.

=== Present-day ===
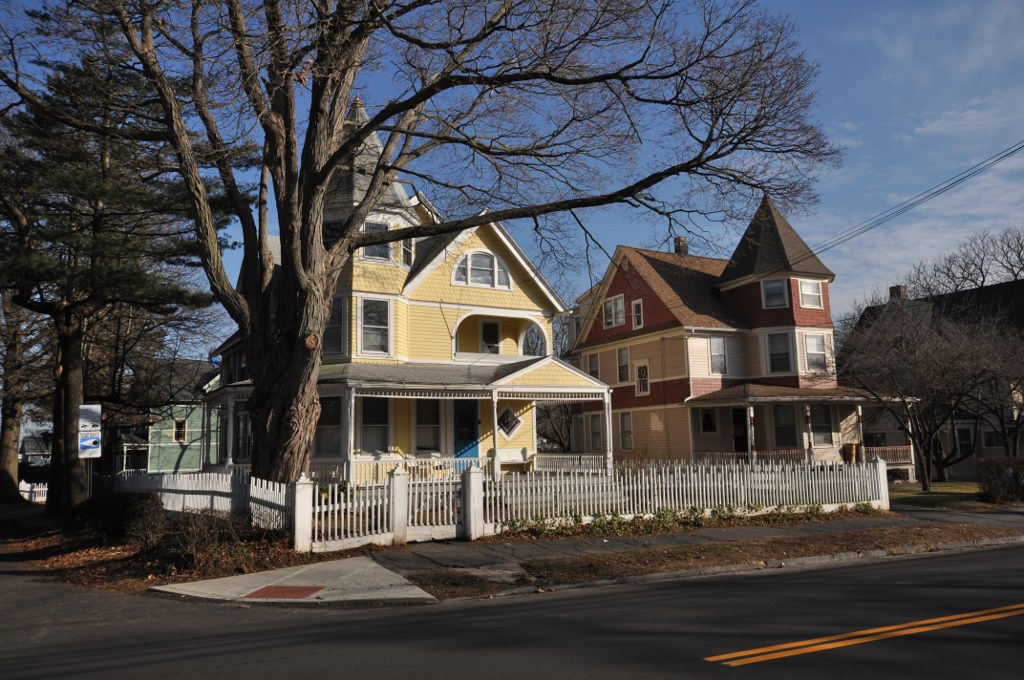
Queen Anne-style houses within the Black Rock Historic District

Black Rock maintains a leafy and seaside character which is typically viewed in stark contrast to the more industrial and urban character of Bridgeport as a whole. Despite this, the area is more affordable compared to many of the surrounding towns, partially due to the association of the neighborhood with Bridgeport.

The neighborhood maintains a diverse character, with sizable Irish, Mexican, Jamaican, and Indian communities. Many who move to the neighborhood are retirees, but the area is also home to a small but growing art scene.

In July 2009, the Black Rock Branch Library, the area's library, expanded in size from 6,000 to 11,000 square feet, and was renovated to be outfitted with wi-fi and public computers.

On December 5, 2011, the Fairfield Metro station opened, which eased the burden on Fairfield station, and made commuting via Metro-North easier for Black Rock residents.

While the neighborhood is overwhelmingly residential, there is a significant commercial presence along Fairfield Avenue, the main thoroughfare, which connects Black Rock to Fairfield and downtown Bridgeport. Fairfield Avenue is in a state of transition with older businesses being replaced by upscale restaurants, cafes, espresso bars, gourmet ice cream shops, and art galleries.

The neighborhood's residential areas lie on either side of Fairfield Avenue, with the area of least density being a section called St. Mary's-by-the-Sea, which consists of Resident AA zoned properties (which require a minimum lot of 11,250 SF). Grovers Hill is the highest elevation in Black Rock and some of the most expensive properties in Black Rock are located on this hill with views of Long Island Sound. There are also direct waterfront properties, including two condominium complexes on the Sound and two on the Ash Creek tidal estuary. St. Mary's-by-the-Sea also has a 9-acre (36,000 m^{2}) public park along the Sound with half a mile of sidewalks and an area for bird watching.

== Transportation ==
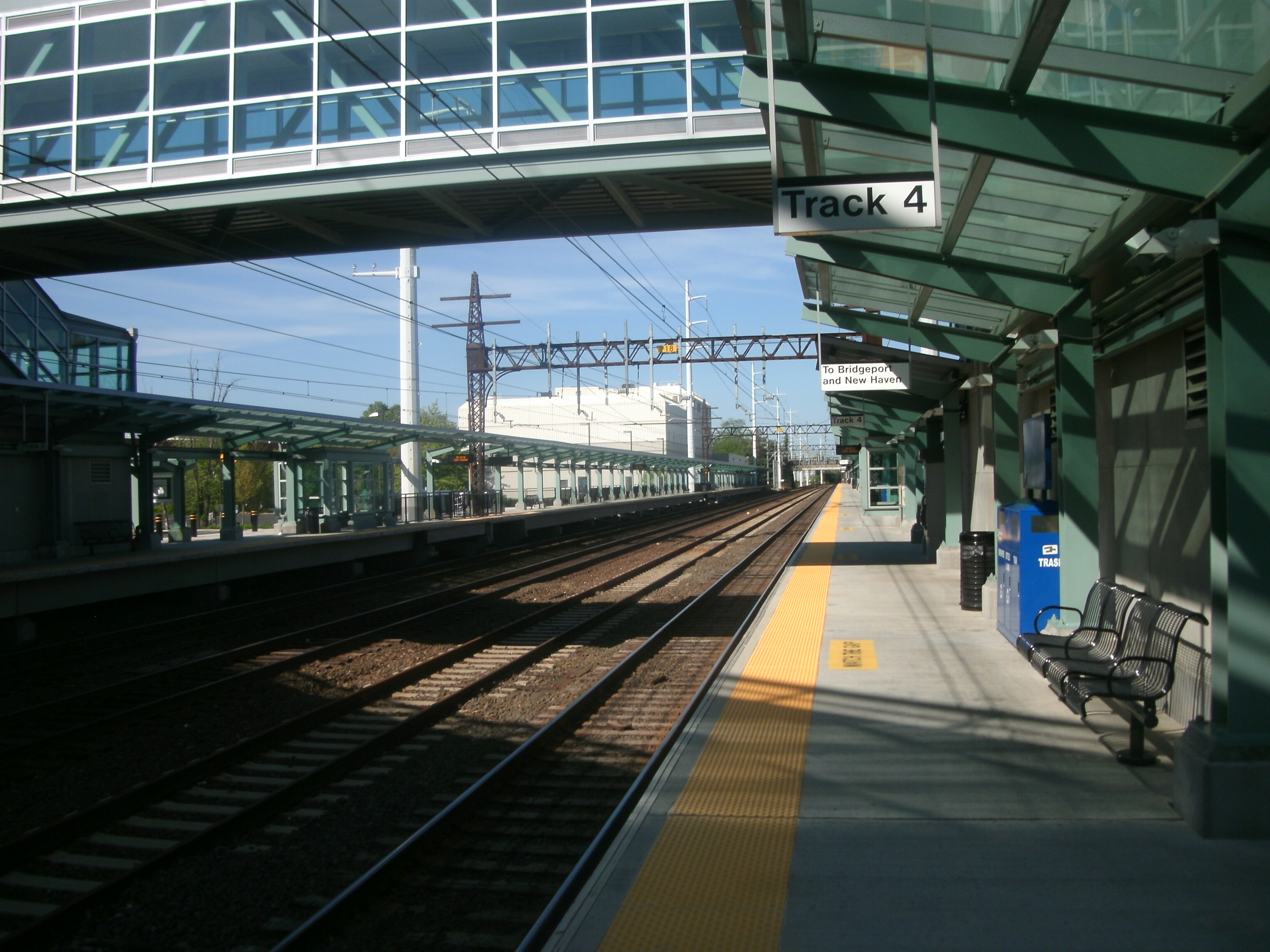
Black Rock is served by Fairfield-Black Rock station on the New Haven Line

Fairfield Avenue is Black Rock's primary artery. Black Rock is also accessible from exit 25 on I-95 and from Route 1, both of which run just north of the area. Black Rock is served by the Fairfield–Black Rock station on Metro-North's New Haven Line, located just across Ash Creek in neighboring Fairfield, which opened on December 5, 2011.

Two Greater Bridgeport Transit bus routes run in Black Rock, primarily along Fairfield Avenue. The Coastal Link, a service provided in conjunction with the Norwalk Transit District and the Milford Transit District, runs eastbound to the Connecticut Post Mall in Milford and westbound to the Norwalk Wheels Hub in Central Norwalk. Greater Bridgeport Transit's Route 5 runs south along Brewster Street (the primary north–south artery that links the neighborhood to neighboring Fairfield) and provides additional eastbound service along Fairfield Avenue. Route 5's primary terminus is the intermodal transit center in Downtown Bridgeport, where riders can make connections to several other bus routes and Metro-North. Service along these routes typically run every 30 minutes Monday through Saturday, while Sunday service is hourly.

== Business Association ==
The Black Rock Business Association (BRBA), originated in 2005, is a group of Black Rock business owners who work together to promote Black Rock as a shopping, dining and entertainment district.

The Black Rock Business Association's activities include:

- Black Rock Harvest Hootenanny
- Managing local website and calendar for www.EnjoyBlackRock.com
- Seasonal neighborhood clean-up projects
- Business development workshops, open to the community
- Sponsorship of neighborhood enhancements, such as trash pick-up

== Bodies of water ==
- Black Rock Harbor
- Cedar Creek
- Ash Creek
- Rooster River
- Long Island Sound
- Burr Creek

== Climate ==
Black Rock has an overall moderate climate, the average January temperature is around 23 degrees (F) and the average high in July is 82 degrees (F). Black Rock has in the past been hit with a number of large winter snow storms. Although the average snowfall is 29", the following is the list of top snow-accumulating winters (October 1 - April 30):

1. 1995-96 - 75.7"
2. 2002-03 - 64"
3. 2010-11 - 62.6"
4. 1966-67 - 61.6"
5. 2012-13 - 61.3"

== Notable residents ==
- John Ratzenberger, actor
- Christopher Shays, former Fourth District congressman
- David Walker, Comptroller General of the United States and head of the Government Accountability Office (GAO) and author of Comeback America (published January 2010)
- Sidney Wood, tennis player
