= Samuel Smedley =

Samuel Smedley (fl. c. 1770) was a ship captain and privateer during the American Revolutionary War from Fairfield, Connecticut.

At age 15, Smedley was the captain of the Defence as a lieutenant of the marines. He was best known for capturing the British ship Cyrus. He also started the "ships' papers collection" currently located at Fairfield Historical Society's library that contains letters by Smedley dating back to the early 19th century.

In his career, he captured or aided in capturing more than a dozen prizes, survived shipwreck, battled Loyalists off the shore of Fairfield, twice captained privateers, and was twice captured by the British, yet was able to escape from the infamous Mill Prison in England.
