= Murray, Connecticut =

Census-designated place in Connecticut, United States

- Census-designated place
- Location within Connecticut Location within the United States
- Coordinates: 41°11′45″N 73°17′13″W
- Country: United States
- State: Connecticut
- County: Fairfield
- Town: Fairfield

Area
  - Total: 1.47 sq mi (3.82 km^{2})
  - Land: 1.51 sq mi (3.92 km^{2})
  - Water: 0 sq mi (0.0 km^{2})
- Elevation: 370 ft (110 m)
- Time zone: UTC-5 (Eastern (EST))
  - Summer (DST): UTC-4 (EDT)
- ZIP Code: 06824 (Fairfield)
- Area codes: 203/475
- FIPS code: 09-49720
- GNIS feature ID: 2805957

Murray is a census-designated place (CDP) in the town of Fairfield, Fairfield County, Connecticut, United States. As of the 2020 census, Murray had a population of 848. It is in the northern part of Fairfield, with Burr Street running north–south through the center of the CDP. The Merritt Parkway crosses the CDP from east to west, with access from Exit 28 (CT 58, Black Rock Turnpike) at the eastern edge of the community.

Murray was first listed as a CDP prior to the 2020 census.
