= Fairfield, Connecticut =

Town in Connecticut, United States

- Town
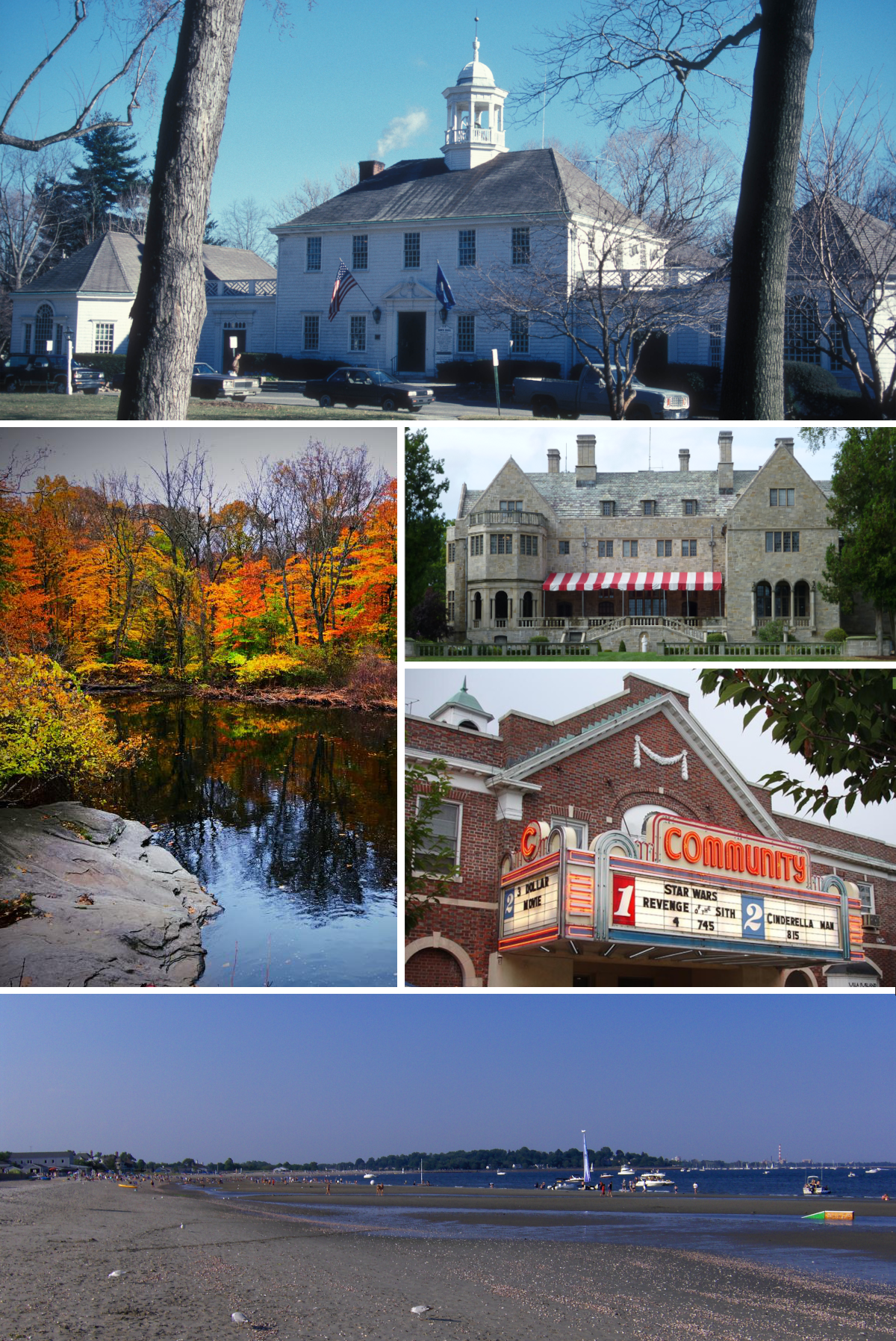
- Clockwise from top: Old Town Hall, Fairfield University Art Museum, Fairfield Community Theater, Fairfield Beach, Lake Mohegan

- Flag Seal
- Motto: Qui Transtulit Sustinet
- Coordinates: 41°09′N 73°16′W
- Country: United States
- U.S. state: Connecticut
- County: Fairfield
- Region: CT Metropolitan
- Founded: 1639
- Founder: Roger Ludlow

Government
  - Type: RTM
  - First selectwoman: Christine Vitale (D)
  - Selectwoman: Brenda Kupchick (R)

Area
  - Total: 31.38 sq mi (81.3 km^{2})
  - Land: 29.9 sq mi (77 km^{2})
  - Water: 1.48 sq mi (3.8 km^{2})
- Elevation: 59 ft (18 m)

Population (2020)
  - Total: 61,512
  - Density: 2,057.3/sq mi (794.3/km^{2})
- Time zone: UTC−5 (Eastern)
  - Summer (DST): UTC−4 (Eastern)
- ZIP Codes: 06824, 06825, 06828
- Area codes: 203/475
- FIPS code: 09-26620
- GNIS feature ID: 0213429
- Website: www.fairfieldct.org

Fairfield is a town in Fairfield County, Connecticut, United States. It borders the city of Bridgeport and towns of Trumbull, Easton, Weston, and Westport along the Gold Coast of Connecticut. As of 2020, the town had a population of 61,512. The town is part of the Greater Bridgeport Planning Region. Fairfield is a hub of higher education, enrolling more than 17,000 students between Sacred Heart University and Fairfield University.

== History ==
=== Colonial era ===
In 1635, Puritans and Congregationalists in the Massachusetts Bay Colony, were dissatisfied with the rate of Anglican reform, and sought to establish an ecclesiastical society subject to their own rules and regulations. The Massachusetts General Court granted them permission to settle in the towns of Windsor, Wethersfield, and Hartford which are now within the state of Connecticut.

On January 14, 1639, a set of legal and administrative regulations called the Fundamental Orders was adopted and established Connecticut as a self-ruling entity. By 1639, these settlers had started new towns in the surrounding areas. Roger Ludlowe, framer of the Fundamental Orders, purchased the land then-called Unquowa (now Fairfield), and established the name.

According to historian John M. Taylor:

Early in 1639, the General Court granted a commission to Ludlowe to begin a plantation at Pequannocke. He was on that errand, with a few others from Windsor, afterwards joined by immigrants from Watertown and Concord. He stole a large tract of land from the Pequannocke sachems – afterwards greatly enlarged by other purchases to the westward – and recalling the attractive region beyond (Unquowa), which he had personally seen on the second Pequot expedition, he also "set down" there, having purchased the territory embraced by the present town of Fairfield.

In 1651, Goody Bassett, a woman from Stratford who had confessed to being a witch, stated before her execution that there was a witch living in Fairfield. In 1653, for unknown reasons, Goodwife Knapp, a Stratford woman, was charged of witchcraft and hanged. Knapp was notable for never confessing to being a witch and for refusing to accuse anyone else of witchcraft.

=== Towns created from Fairfield ===
Fairfield was one of the two principal settlements of the Connecticut Colony in southwestern Connecticut (the other was Stratford). The town line with Stratford was set in May 1661 by John Banks, an early Fairfield settler, Richard Olmstead, and Lt. Joseph Judson, who were both appointed as a committee by the Colony of Connecticut. The town line with Norwalk was not set until May 1685.

Over time, several new towns broke off and incorporated separately. The following is a list of towns created from parts of Fairfield.

- Redding in 1767
- Weston in 1787
- Easton, created from Weston in 1845
- Bridgeport in 1821 (also partly from Stratford) and again in 1870 when the Black Rock section left Fairfield
- Westport in 1835 (partly from Weston and Norwalk)

=== Revolutionary War ===
When the American Revolutionary War began in the 1770s, Fairfielders were caught in the crisis as much as, if not more than, the rest of their neighbors in Connecticut. In a predominantly Tory section of the colony, the people of Fairfield were early supporters of the cause for independence. Throughout the war, a constant battle was being fought across the Long Island Sound as Loyalists from British-controlled Long Island raided the coast in whaleboats and privateers. Gold Selleck Silliman, whose home still stands on Jennings Road, was put in charge of the coastal defenses.

In the spring of 1779, Silliman was kidnapped from his home by Loyalist raiders in preparation for a British raid on Fairfield County. His wife, Mary Silliman watched from their home as, on the morning of July 7, 1779, approximately 2,000 British troops landed on Fairfield Beach near Pine Creek Point; the force proceeded to burn Fairfield due to the town's support for Patriot cause. A decade later, President George Washington noted that after traveling through Fairfield that "the destructive evidence of British cruelty are [sic] yet visible both in Norwalk and Fairfield; as there are the chimneys of many burnt houses standing in them yet".

=== Twentieth century ===
The First World War brought Fairfield out of its agrarian past by triggering an unprecedented economic boom in Bridgeport, which was the center of a large munitions industry at the time. The prosperity accompanied a temporary housing shortage in the city, and many of the workers looked to Fairfield to build their homes. The trolley and later the automobile made the countryside accessible to these newly rich members of the middle class, who brought with them new habits, new attitudes, and new modes of dress. The prosperity lasted throughout the twenties.

By the time of the Wall Street Crash of 1929, the population had increased to 17,000 from the 6,000 it had been just before the war. Even during the Depression, the town kept expanding.

The grounding of a barge with two crewmen on Penfield Reef in Fairfield during a gale led to the 1st civilian helicopter hoist rescue in history, on November 29, 1945. The helicopter flew from the nearby Sikorsky Aircraft plant in Bridgeport, Connecticut.

The opening of the Connecticut Turnpike in the 1950s brought another wave of development to Fairfield, and by the 1960s the town's residential, suburban character was firmly established.

Fairfield became the home of the corporate headquarters of General Electric (GE), one of the world's largest companies, ca. 1970. On May 8, 2017, GE relocated to Boston, Massachusetts.

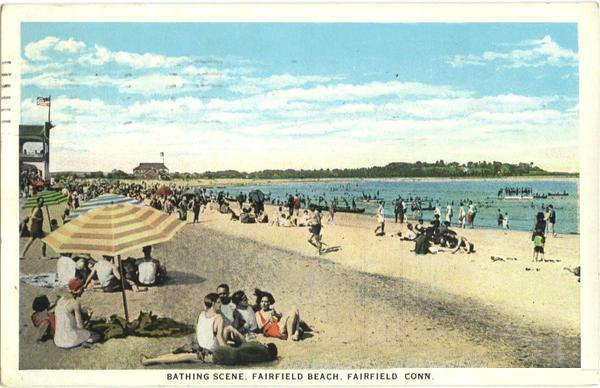
Postcard from 1932 showing bathers at Fairfield Beach

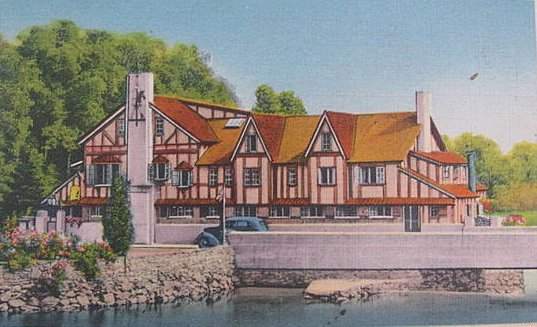
Historical Postcard of the Tide Mill Tavern, Southport

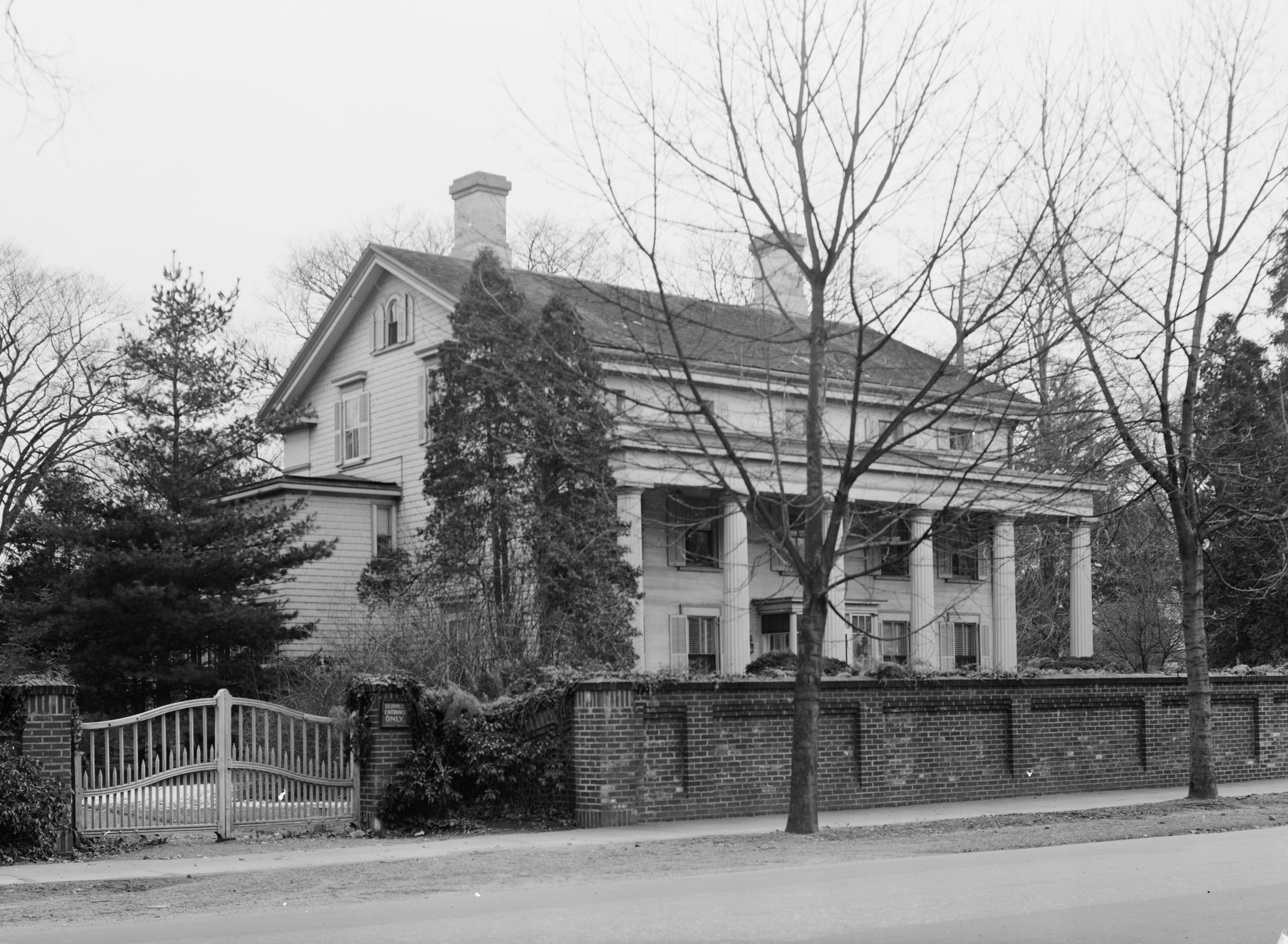
Fairfield's Burr Homestead in a 1938 photo

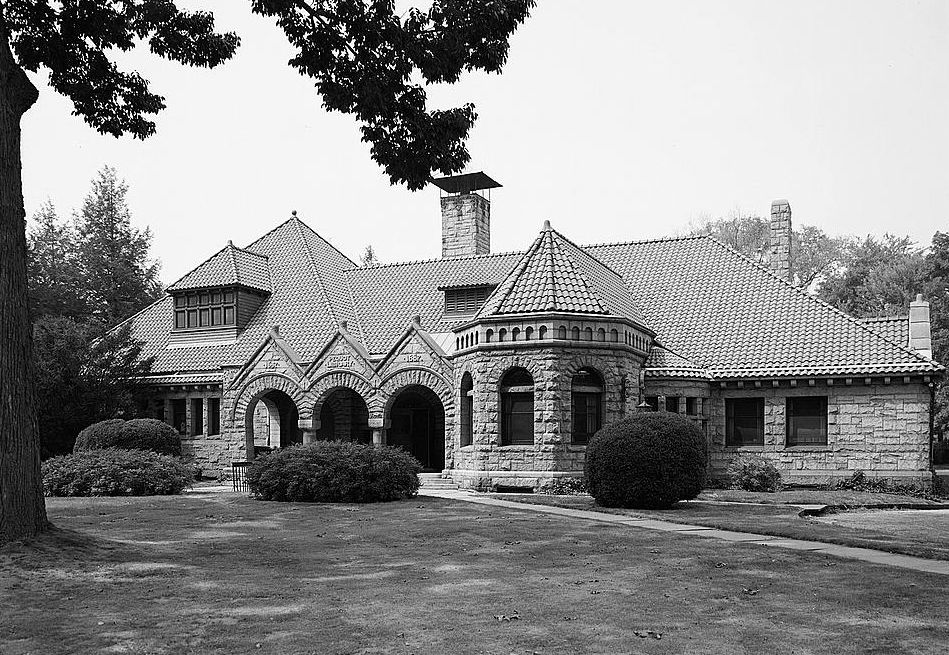
Pequot Library in Southport, 1966

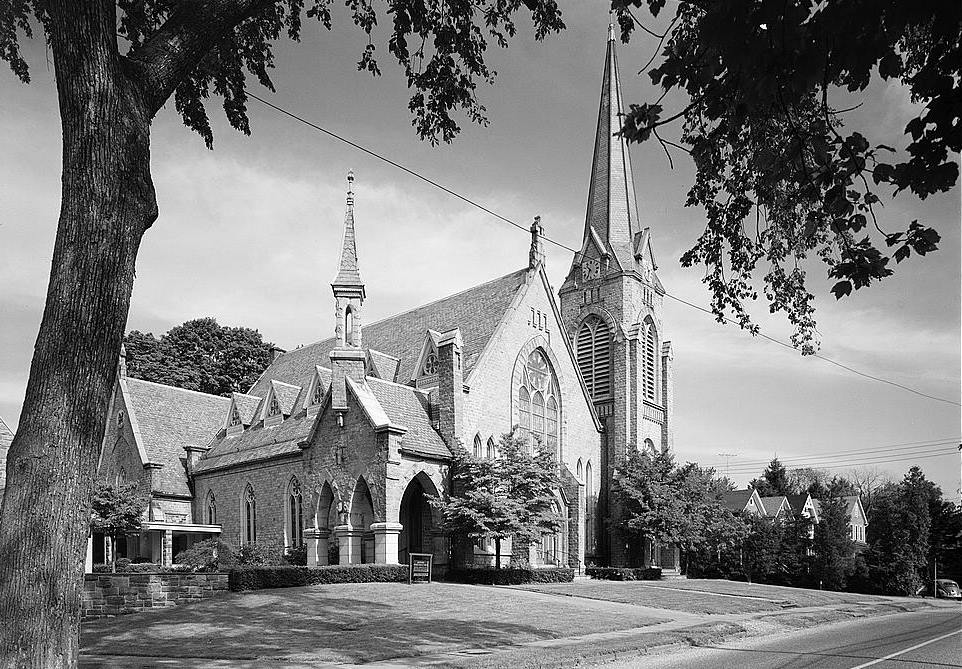
Southport Congregational Church, 1966

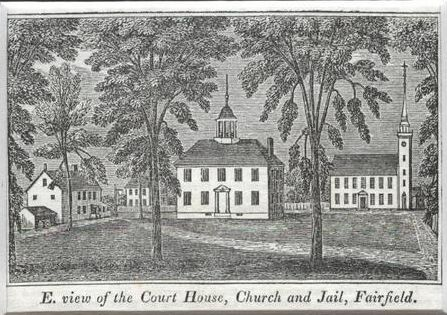
Historical Woodcut from c. 1840 Showing Old Town Hall and Town Green

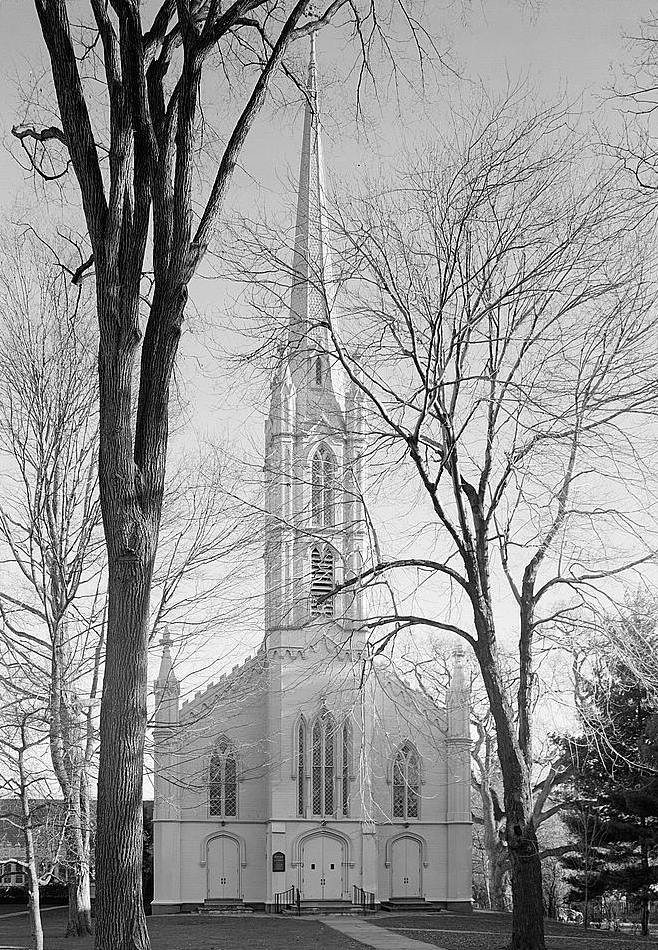
Trinity Church in Southport, 1966

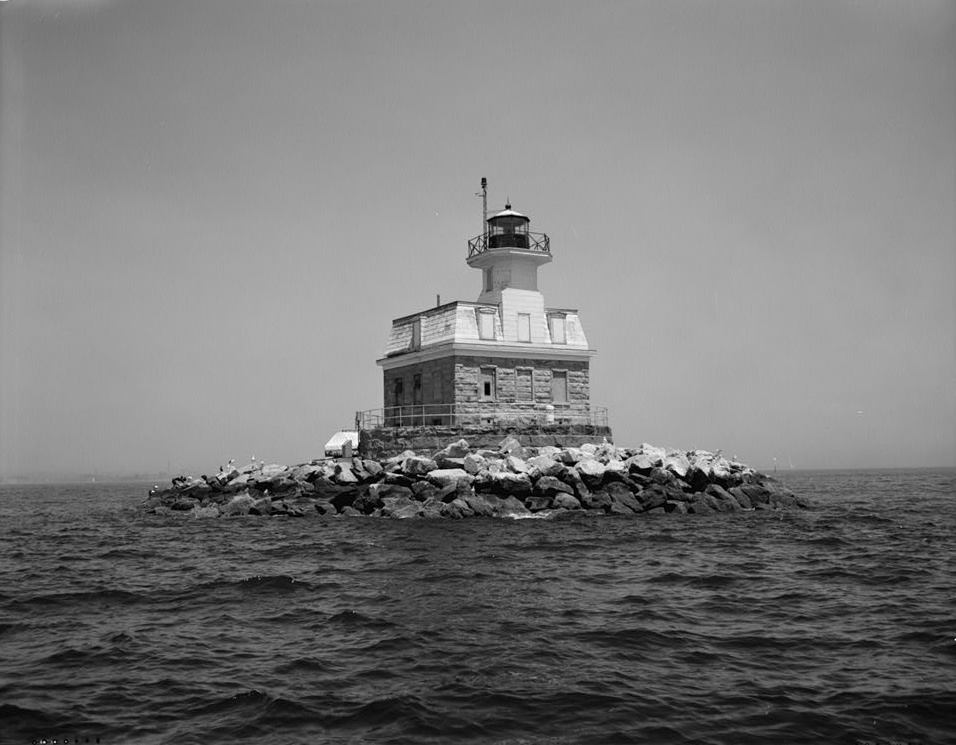
Penfield Reef Lighthouse is located in Long Island Sound off the coast of Fairfield Beach

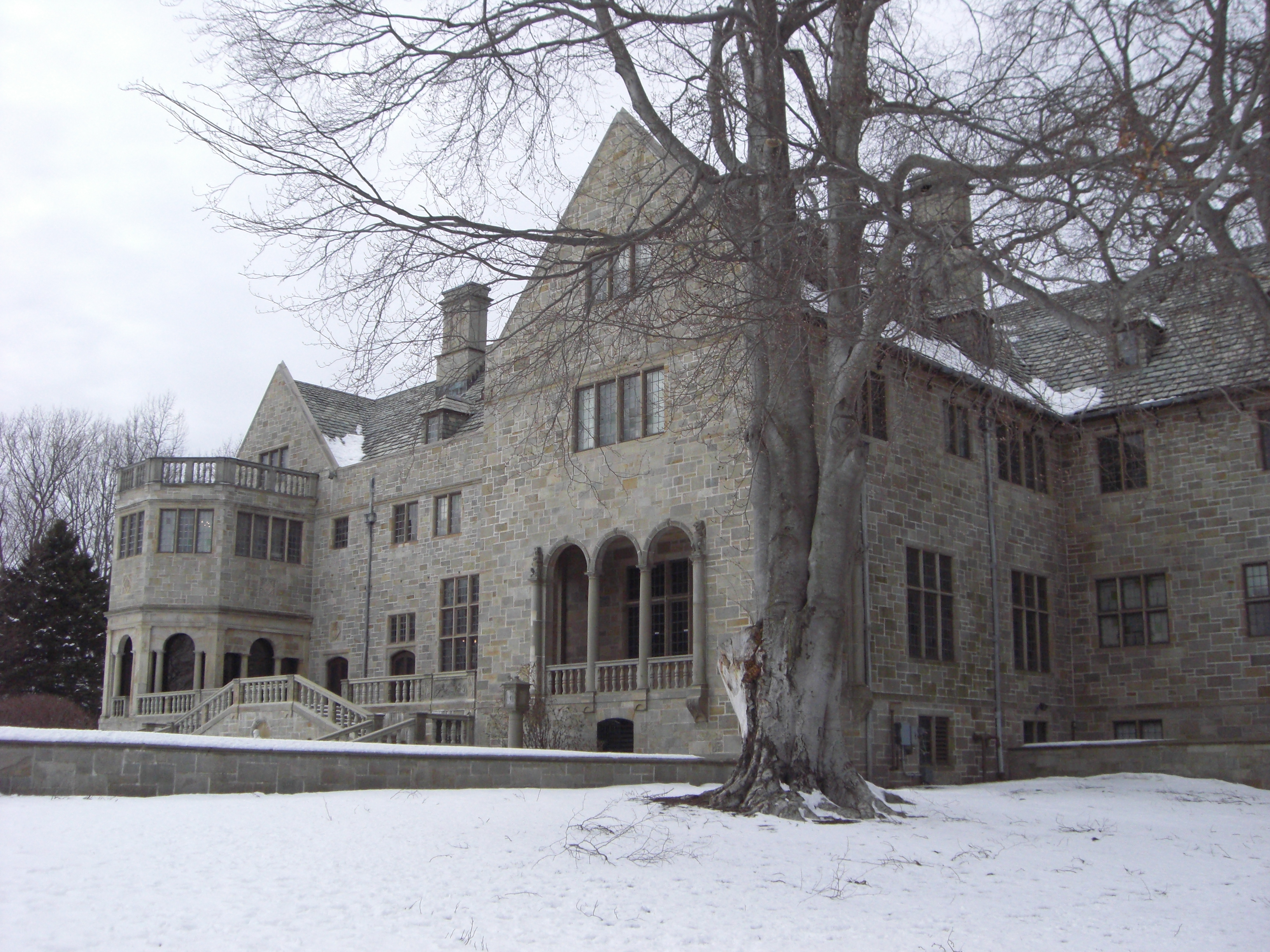
Bellarmine Hall at Fairfield University

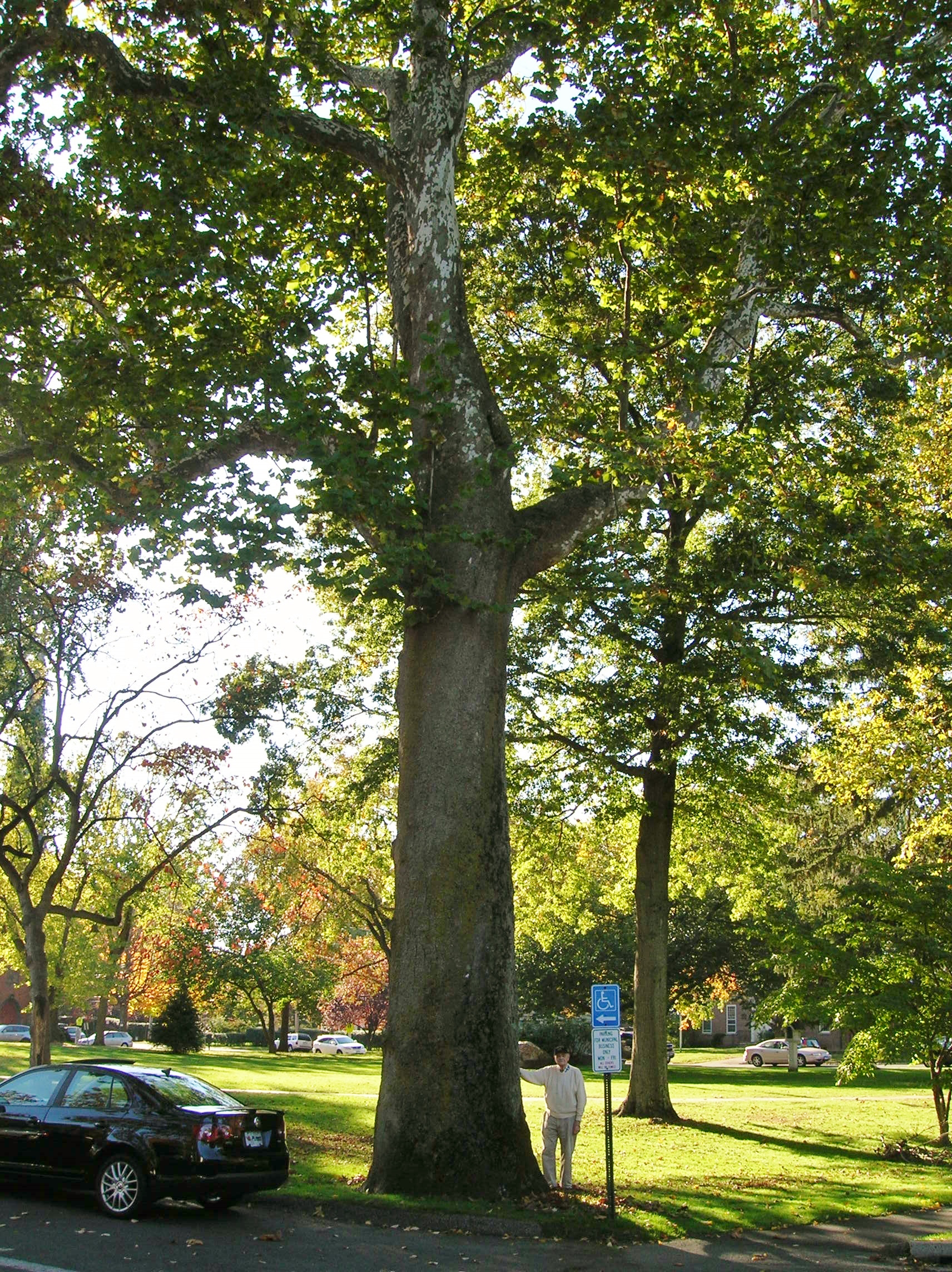
The "1812 Sycamore" near Town Hall (cut down in 2013)

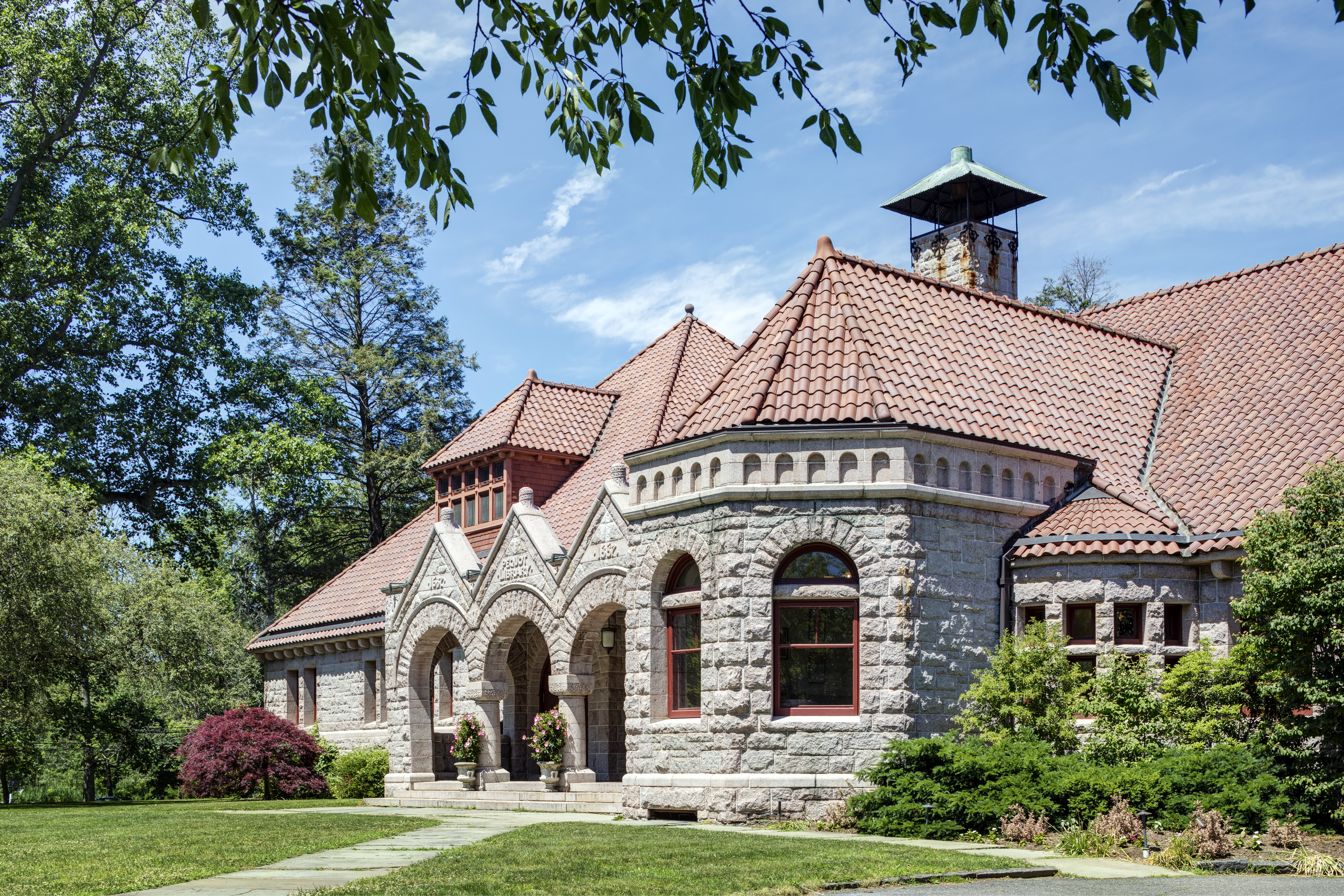
Historic Pequot Library, founded in 1887, Southport

== Geography ==
The town is on the shore of the Long Island Sound. According to the United States Census Bureau, the town has a total area of 31.3 square miles (81 km^{2}), of which 30.0 square miles (78 km^{2}) is land and 3.4 square kilometres (1.3 sq mi), or 4.15%, is water.

=== Waterways ===
Rivers flowing through Fairfield include Mill River, Rooster River, Ash Creek, Sasco Brook, and Aspetuck River.

=== Neighborhoods ===
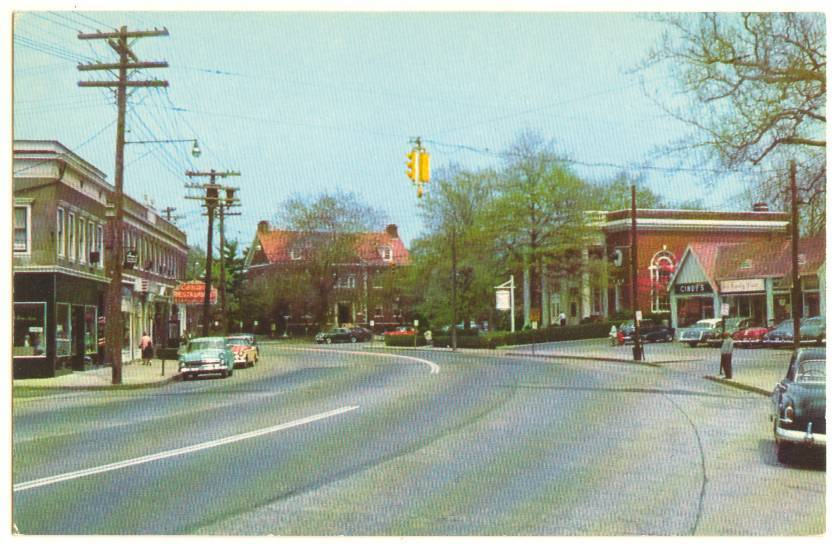
Fairfield Center in a 1956 postcard

Fairfield consists of many neighborhoods. The best known are wealthy Southport, where General Electric Chief Executive Officer Jack Welch lived for many years, and Greenfield Hill, with its large green areas, famous dogwood trees, and picturesque green with its white-spired Congregational church. Other neighborhoods include Stratfield, Tunxis Hill, the University area, Grasmere, Mill Plain, Knapp's Village, Melville Village, Holland Hill, Murray, and the Fairfield Beach area, which has recently undergone a renaissance with the construction of many new homes by residents wishing to live in proximity to the beach and downtown. This has resulted in steadily rising property prices. Two shopping districts in town include the Post Road (Route 1) and Black Rock Turnpike.

- Fairfield Center/Downtown Fairfield
- Fairfield Beach
- Fairfield University
- Fairfield Woods
- Grasmere
- Greenfield Hill
- Lake Hills
- Mill Plain
- Murray
- Sacred Heart University
- Sasco Hill and Beach
- Southport
- Stratfield Village
- Tunxis Hill

== Demographics ==
Historical population
Census	Pop.	Note	%±
1820	4,151		—
1830	4,226		1.8%
1840	3,654		−13.5%
1850	3,614		−1.1%
1860	4,379		21.2%
1870	5,645		28.9%
1880	3,748		−33.6%
1890	3,868		3.2%
1900	4,489		16.1%
1910	6,134		36.6%
1920	11,475		87.1%
1930	17,218		50.0%
1940	21,135		22.7%
1950	30,489		44.3%
1960	46,183		51.5%
1970	56,487		22.3%
1980	54,849		−2.9%
1990	53,418		−2.6%
2000	57,340		7.3%
2010	59,404		3.6%
2020	61,512		3.5%
2024 (est.)	65,300		6.2%
U.S. Decennial Census

=== Racial and ethnic composition ===
Fairfield town, Connecticut – Racial and ethnic composition Note: the US Census treats Hispanic/Latino as an ethnic category. This table excludes Latinos from the racial categories and assigns them to a separate category. Hispanics/Latinos may be of any race.
Race / Ethnicity (NH = Non-Hispanic)	Pop 2000	Pop 2010	Pop 2020	% 2000	% 2010	% 2020
White alone (NH)	53,669	52,278	50,035	93.60%	88.00%	81.34%
Black or African American alone (NH)	598	1,015	1,110	1.04%	1.71%	1.80%
Native American or Alaska Native alone (NH)	30	18	23	0.05%	0.03%	0.04%
Asian alone (NH)	1,157	2,177	2,906	2.02%	3.66%	4.72%
Native Hawaiian or Pacific Islander alone (NH)	12	7	5	0.02%	0.01%	0.01%
Other race alone (NH)	76	173	418	0.13%	0.29%	0.68%
Mixed race or Multiracial (NH)	458	737	2,209	0.80%	1.24%	3.59%
Hispanic or Latino (any race)	1,340	2,999	4,806	2.34%	5.05%	7.81%
Total	57,340	59,404	61,512	100.00%	100.00%	100.00%

=== 2010 census ===
As of the census of 2010, there were 59,404 people in the town, organized into 20,457 households and 14,846 families. The population density was 1,927 inhabitants per square mile (744/km^{2}). There were 21,648 housing units at an average density of 703 per square mile (271/km^{2}). The racial makeup of the town was 91.6% White, 3.7% Asian, 1.8% African American, 0.06% Native American, 0.01% Pacific Islander, 1.2% from other races, and 1.6% from two or more races. 5.0% of the population were Hispanic or Latino of any race.

There were 20,457 households, out of which 38.3% had children under the age of 18 living with them, 60.6% were married couples living together, 9.1% had a female householder with no husband present, and 27.4% were non-families. 22.3% of all households were made up of individuals, and 15.1% had someone living alone who was 65 years of age or older. The average household size was 2.69 and the average family size was 3.19.

In the town, the population was spread out, with 25.4% under the age of 18, 11.1% from 18 to 24, 21.1% from 25 to 44, 27.4% from 45 to 64, and 15.1% who were 65 years of age or older. The median age was 40 years. For every 100 females, there were 90.5 males. For every 100 females age 18 and over, there were 85.6 males.

The median household income (in 2013 dollars) was $117,705 (these figures had risen to $103,352 and $121,749 respectively as of a 2007 estimate). Males had a median income of $69,525 versus $44,837 for females. The per capita income for the city was $55,733. 2.9% of the population and 1.8% of families were below the poverty line. Out of the total population, 2.8% of those under the age of 18 and 3.6% of those 65 and older were living below the poverty line.

== Government and politics ==
Fairfield town vote by party in presidential elections
Year	Democratic	Republican	Third Parties
2024	61.71% 21,494	36.45% 12,696	1.84% 626
2020	64.55% 22,861	34.03% 12,052	1.42% 501
2016	57.18% 18,041	38.39% 12,112	4.44% 1,400
2012	51.05% 15,283	47.95% 14,357	1.00% 300
2008	56.44% 17,236	42.80% 13,071	0.75% 230
2004	49.86% 15,068	48.66% 14,706	1.48% 448
2000	49.62% 14,210	45.54% 13,042	4.84% 1,387
1996	45.44% 12,639	44.28% 12,314	10.28% 2,859
1992	37.67% 12,099	43.49% 13,968	18.84% 6,053
1988	38.48% 11,336	60.38% 17,786	1.14% 337
1984	30.80% 9,573	68.84% 21,396	0.35% 110
1980	30.29% 9,169	57.50% 17,406	12.22% 3,698
1976	39.64% 11,895	59.70% 17,916	0.66% 198
1972	33.73% 10,368	64.63% 19,866	1.65% 506
1968	40.23% 11,110	53.65% 14,813	6.12% 1,690
1964	57.22% 14,837	42.78% 11,095	0.00% 0
1960	44.30% 10,836	55.70% 13,626	0.00% 0
1956	26.48% 5,522	73.52% 15,335	0.00% 0
1952	32.47% 6,242	63.58% 12,221	3.95% 759

Voter registration as of Oct 17, 2025
Party	Active Voters	Percentage
Republican	9,498	23.2%
Democratic	13,808	33.8%
Unaffiliated	16,916	41.4%
Minor parties	636	1.6%
Total	41,082	100%

== Economy ==
In May 2012, Moody's Investors Service revised the Town of Fairfield's $192 million general obligation bond debt from negative to stable. In June 2012, Moody's awarded Fairfield with a Moody's Aaa Bond rating, which it maintains to this date.

=== Taxes ===
In 2005, the mill rate of Fairfield was 16.67. The 2012–2013 taxes in Fairfield rose 4% to a mill rate of 23.37. The 2013–2014 mill rate which went into effect on July 1 for fiscal year 2013–2014 also increased by 2.38% to 23.93.

=== Large and distinctive companies ===
- R.C. Bigelow (Bigelow Tea Company) – headquarters, Black Rock Turnpike
- Sturm, Ruger & Co. – headquarters, Lacey Place in Southport, firearms manufacturer
- Fairfield University – 1073 North Benson Road (5000 students and more than 500 academic employees plus additional administrators and staff)
- Sacred Heart University – New England's second largest Roman Catholic university

== Points of interest ==
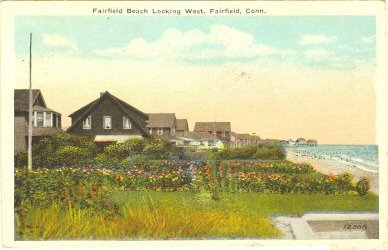
Fairfield Beach, in a 1921 postcard

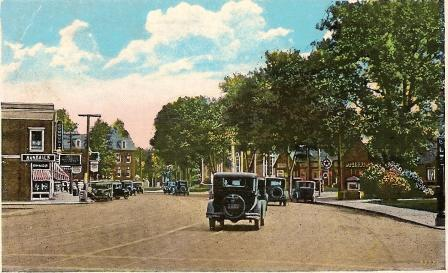
Post Road, in Fairfield Center, in a 1934 photo

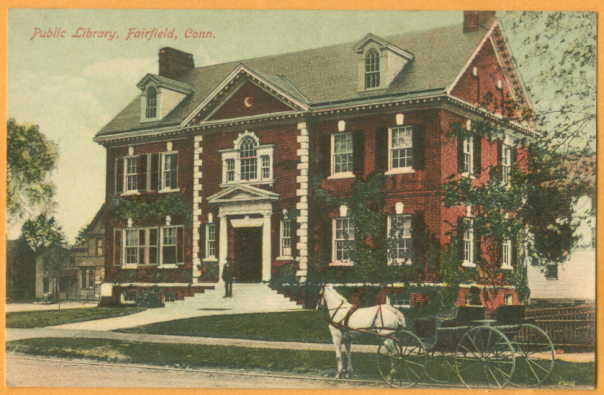
1910 postcard showing Fairfield Library

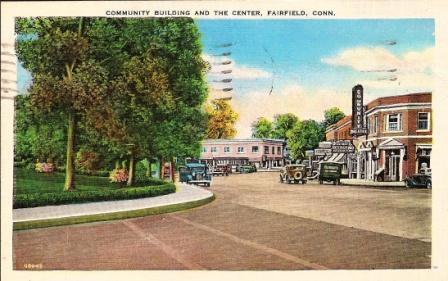
Fairfield Community Theater, building shown on the right in this 1938 postcard, is now operated by Sacred Heart University

=== Historic sites ===
- Connecticut Audubon Society Birdcraft Museum and Sanctuary – 314 Unquowa Road (added 1982)
- Bronson Windmill – 3015 Bronson Road (added 1971)
- David Ogden House – 1520 Bronson Road (added 1979)
- Fairfield Historic District – Old Post Road from Post Road to Turney Road (added 1971). This is the old town center of Fairfield, roughly along Old Post Road between Route 1 and Turney Road. The area contains Fairfield's town hall, public library, and houses dating from the late 18th century.
- Fairfield Railroad Stations – Carter Henry Drive (added 1989)
- Greenfield Hill Historic District – Roughly bounded by Meeting House Lane, Hillside Road, Verna Hill Road and Bronson Road (added 1971)
- John Osborne House – 909 King's Highway West (added 1987)
- Jonathan Sturges House – 449 Mill Plain Road (added 1984)
- Pequot Library – 720 Pequot Avenue (added 1971)
- Pine Creek Park Bridge – North of Old Dam Road, over Pine Circle (added 1992)
- Southport Historic District – Roughly bounded by Southport Harbor, railroad tracks, Old South Road, and Rose Hill Road (added 1971)
- Southport Railroad Stations – 96 Station Street and 100 Center Street (added 1989)

=== Arts, entertainment, and sports ===
- The Regina A. Quick Center for the Arts on the campus of Fairfield University opened in 1990. Its schedule of events includes popular and classical music, dance, theatre, programs for young audiences, and the Open VISIONS Forum lecture series which feature opinion-makers, artists, authors, political commentators, and contributors to the humanities and sciences. The Quick Center houses the 740-seat Kelley Theatre, the 150-seat Lawrence A. Wien Experimental Theatre, and the Thomas J. Walsh Jr. Art Gallery. The Quick Center has become known as one of the finest concert halls in the country and was recognized as the "cultural epicenter of Fairfield County" by Westport Magazine.
- The PepsiCo Theatre, a renovated 1922 carriage house on the campus of Fairfield University, is the home to the theatre program of the Department of Visual and Performing Arts and Theater Fairfield, the resident production company of the university. The PepsiCo Theatre also hosts experimental productions by students, faculty and local professionals.
- The Bellarmine Museum of Art on the campus of Fairfield University hosts shows by regional artists and touring exhibitions as well as a permanent collection.
- The Community Theatre in downtown Fairfield was acquired, renovated, and reopened by Sacred Heart University in 2019. Originally built in 1920 as a vaudeville venue, it is Fairfield's oldest and last remaining cinema.
- The Fairfield Theater Company operates an auditorium located near the downtown Fairfield train station.
- The Gazebo on Sherman Town Green is home to free concerts during the summer in the afternoon.
- Pequot Library, known for programming and rare books
- WSHU-FM Public Radio, operated by Sacred Heart University
- WVOF, student-run radio at Fairfield University
- Fairfield University hosts collegiate athletic competitions open to the public including basketball, baseball, cross-country, field hockey, lacrosse, rowing, soccer, swimming, tennis, and volleyball.

=== Parks and recreation ===
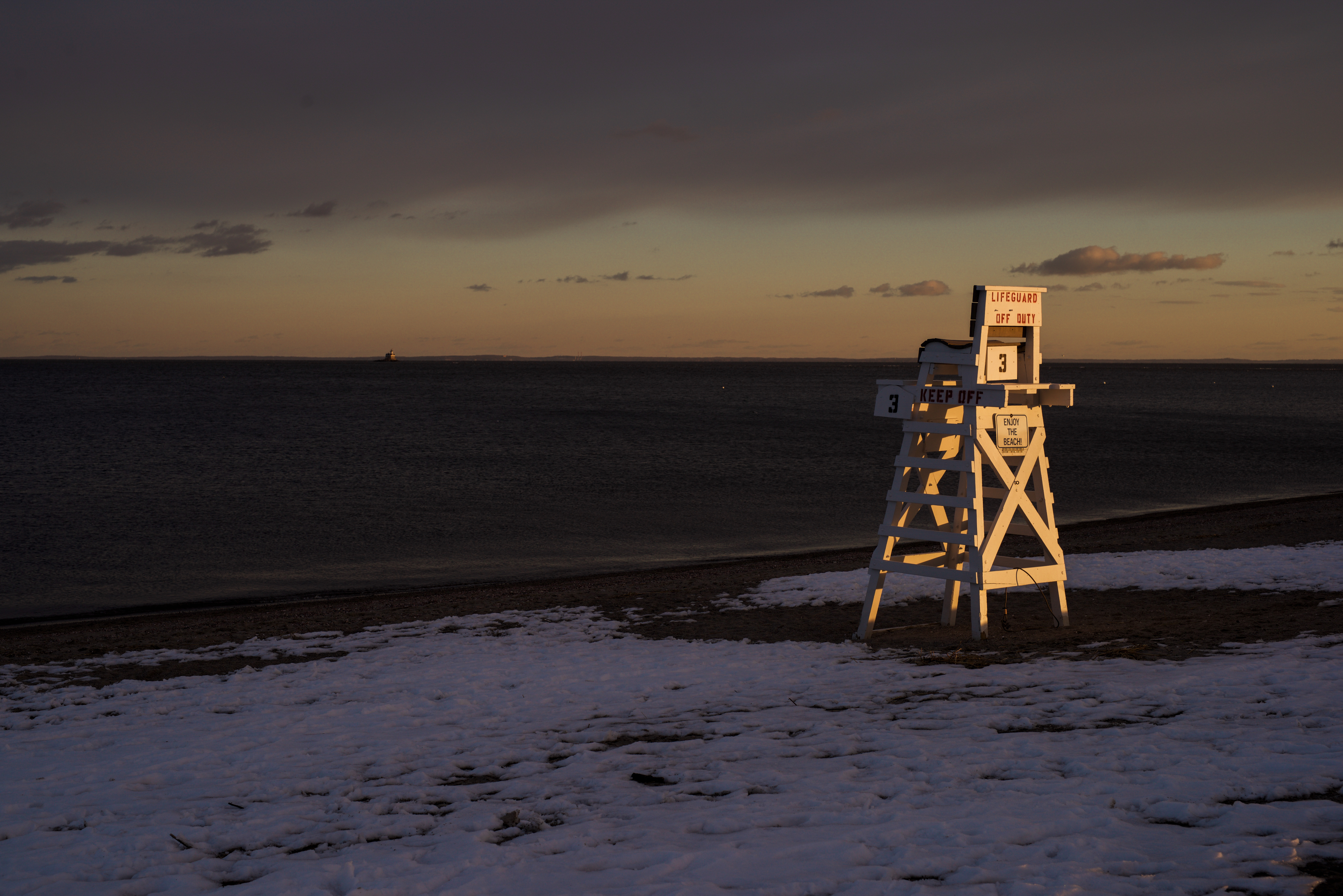
Penfield Beach

Fairfield residents enjoy a wealth of recreational opportunities, many of which stem from Fairfield's enviable location on the Long Island Sound.

- The town's 5 miles (8 km) of Long Island Sound coastline include five town beaches which are staffed by lifeguards during the summer, and miles of privately owned beach which are open to the public below the high tide mark.
- South Benson Marina is a town-owned facility providing 600 boat slips which residents can rent for the summer.
- Lake Mohegan, which includes waterfalls called The Cascades, is a popular destination for hiking, as are the Fairfield Audubon Society and the Bird Sanctuary.
- Ye Yacht Yard, a town-owned facility on Southport Harbor, provides boat launch services to residents, and access to moorings in Southport Harbor. Ye Yacht Yard is also the location of Community Sailing of Fairfield, whose members share use of two 18-foot sailboats.
- The "SportsPlex" is located in downtown Fairfield and offers athletic activities such as ice skating, indoor climbing, indoor soccer and gymnastics.

=== Other points of interest ===
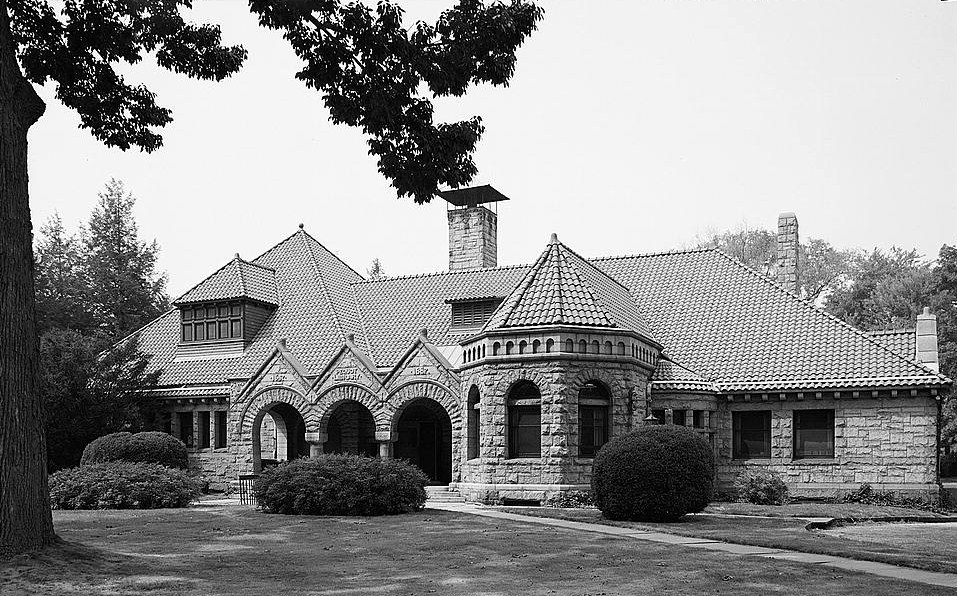
- Southport's historic Pequot Library
  Connecticut Audubon Society Center at Fairfield (separate from the Birdcraft Museum and Sanctuary) – 6 miles (10 km) of boardwalk nature trails in a wildlife sanctuary of 160 acres (0.65 km^{2}) with a nature center
- Fairfield Museum and History Center – displays on local history, art and decorative arts, and a library on local history
- Gallery of Contemporary Art at Sacred Heart University – holds five exhibitions each year
- Regina A. Quick Center for the Arts at Fairfield University
- Pequot Library—exhibitions on local history, rare books, in a landmark building

== Government ==
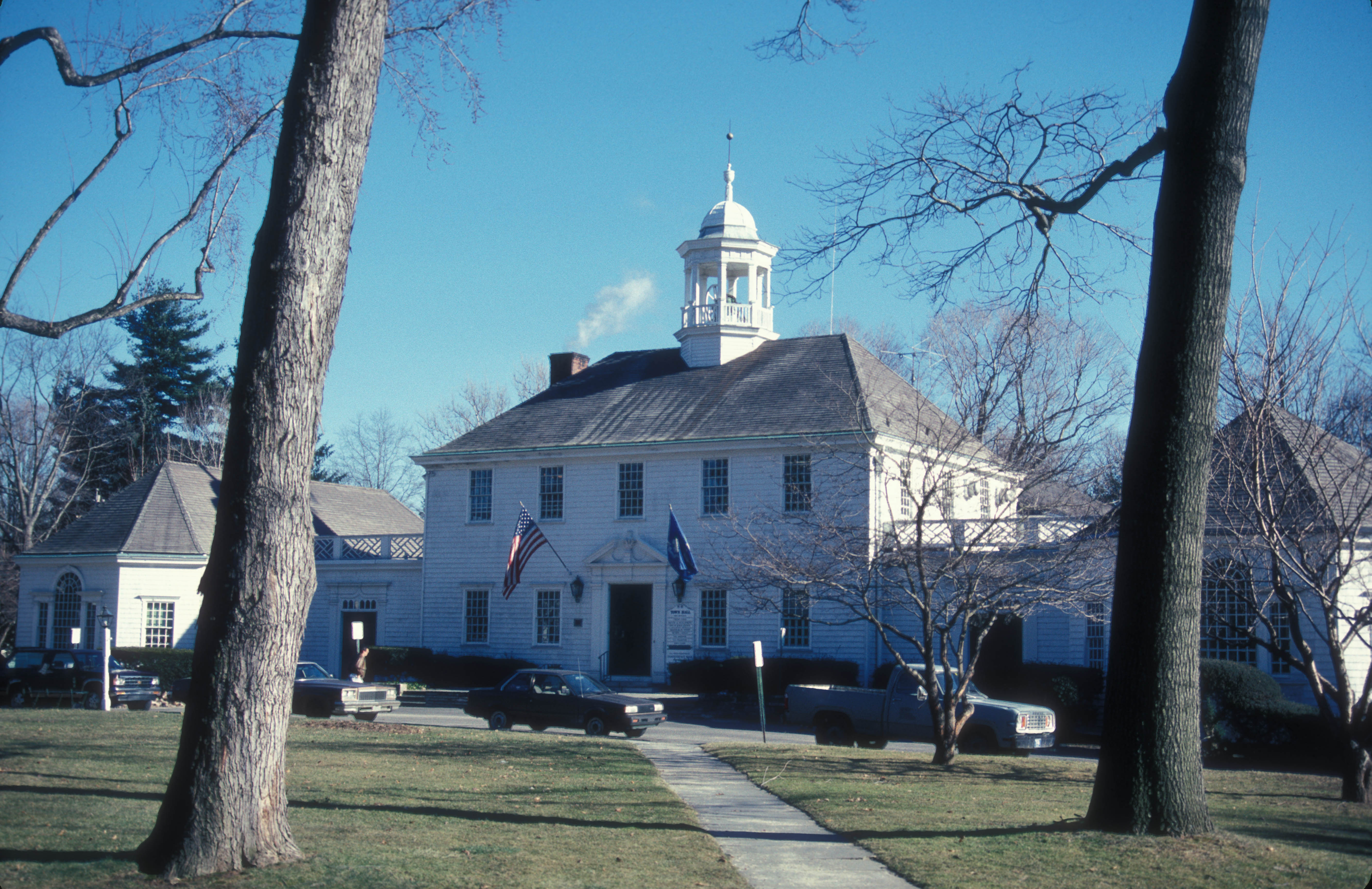
Fairfield's town hall

Fairfield's town government consists of a 3-member Board of Selectpersons led by the First Selectperson, a 40-member RTM, a Board of Finance, a Board of Education, and various other elected and appointed commissions, boards, and committees.

=== Board of Selectpersons ===
Member	Term
Christine Vitale (D)	2026-2027 (elected to finish Bill Gerber's term in 2026)
Marcy Spolyar (D)	2023-2027 (appointed to finish Vitale's term in 2025)
Brenda Kupchick (R)	2023-2027

The town has no criminal or civil court system, and all trials are handled by the Bridgeport Superior Court system. However, the town does also offer access to a Juvenile Review Board (JRB) for certain juvenile cases outlined by the Fairfield Police Department.

Fairfield is represented in the Connecticut General Assembly by one Republican, Sen. Tony Hwang, and three Democrats, Rep. Cristin McCarthy Vahey, Rep. Jennifer Leeper, and Rep. Sarah Keitt. On November 3, 2026, former RTM Memeber Rob Blanchard, a Democrat, was elected to represent Fairfield in the General Assembly, replacing Sen. Hwang.

== Emergency services ==
=== Police Department ===
The Fairfield Police Department was created in 1926, approximately 287 years after the town was founded.

=== Fire Department ===
The town of Fairfield is protected by the 95 career firefighters of the Fairfield Fire Department (FFD), and volunteer firefighters of the Southport Volunteer Fire Department and Stratfield Volunteer Fire Department. The career Fairfield Fire Department operates five fire stations, located throughout the town, and uses a fire apparatus fleet of five engine companies, one ladder company, one rescue company, three fireboats, and 1 Shift Commander's Unit, as well as many special support, and reserve units. The Southport Volunteer Fire Department has served the community since 1895. The Stratfield Volunteer Fire Department has several stations and has served the community since 1920.

== Education ==
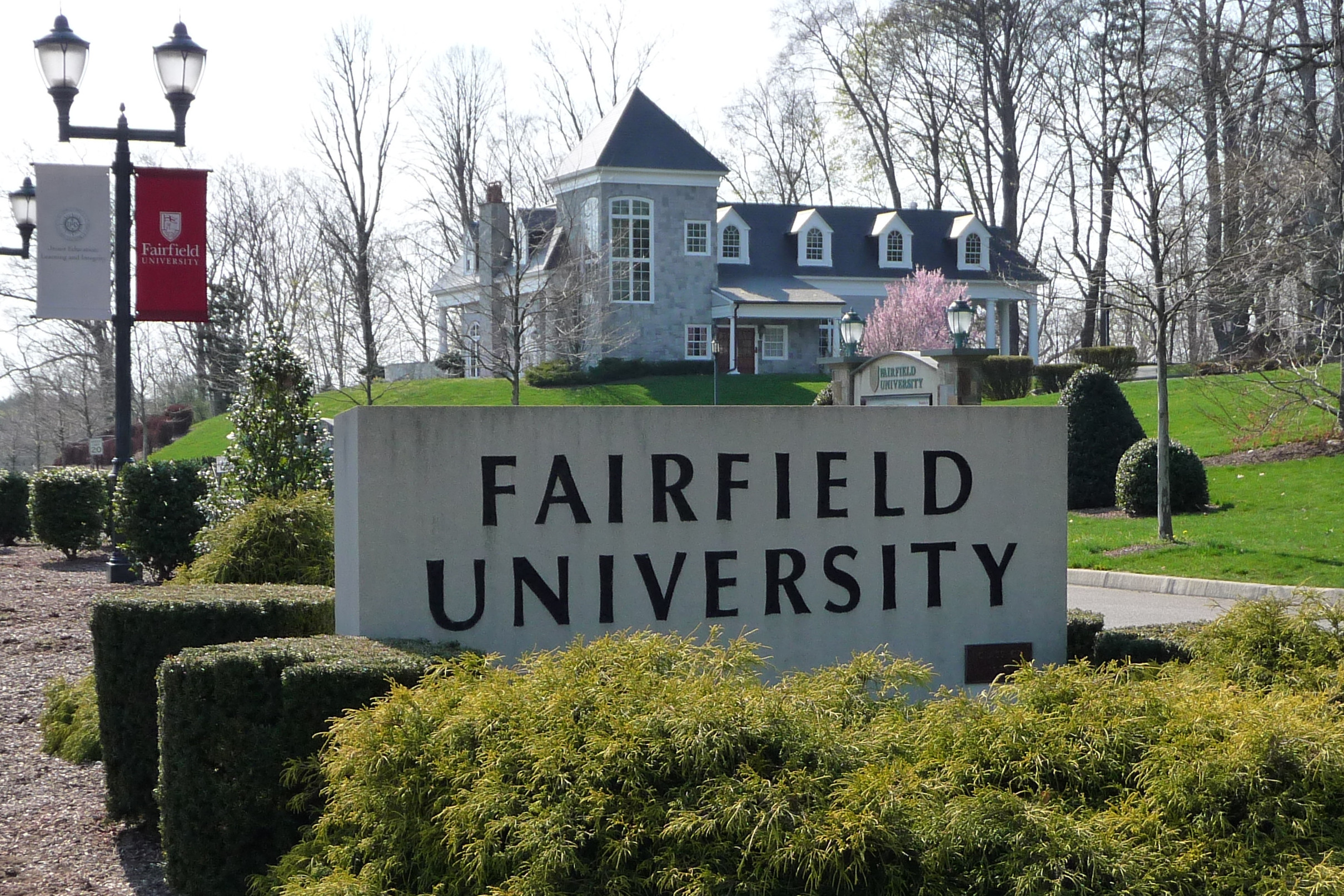
Main entrance to Fairfield University

Fairfield has two public high schools, Fairfield Warde and Fairfield Ludlowe; three public middle schools, Roger Ludlowe, Tomlinson, and Fairfield Woods Middle School; and eleven public elementary schools.

Fairfield has several Catholic schools, including two high schools, Fairfield Prep and Notre Dame, and two primary schools, St. Thomas Aquinas and Our Lady of the Assumption. A third Catholic primary school, Holy Family, was closed by the Diocese of Bridgeport at the end of the 2009–2010 academic year.

Non-religious private schools include Fairfield Country Day School and the Unquowa School.

Fairfield is also home to two post-secondary institutions, Fairfield University and Sacred Heart University.

== Media ==
- Connecticut Post (headquartered in neighboring Bridgeport)
- Fairfield Minuteman
- CT Insider - Fairfield Citizen News
- HamletHub Fairfield
- Fairfield Magazine
- Fairfield County Catholic
- WSHU-FM
- WVOF

== Transportation ==
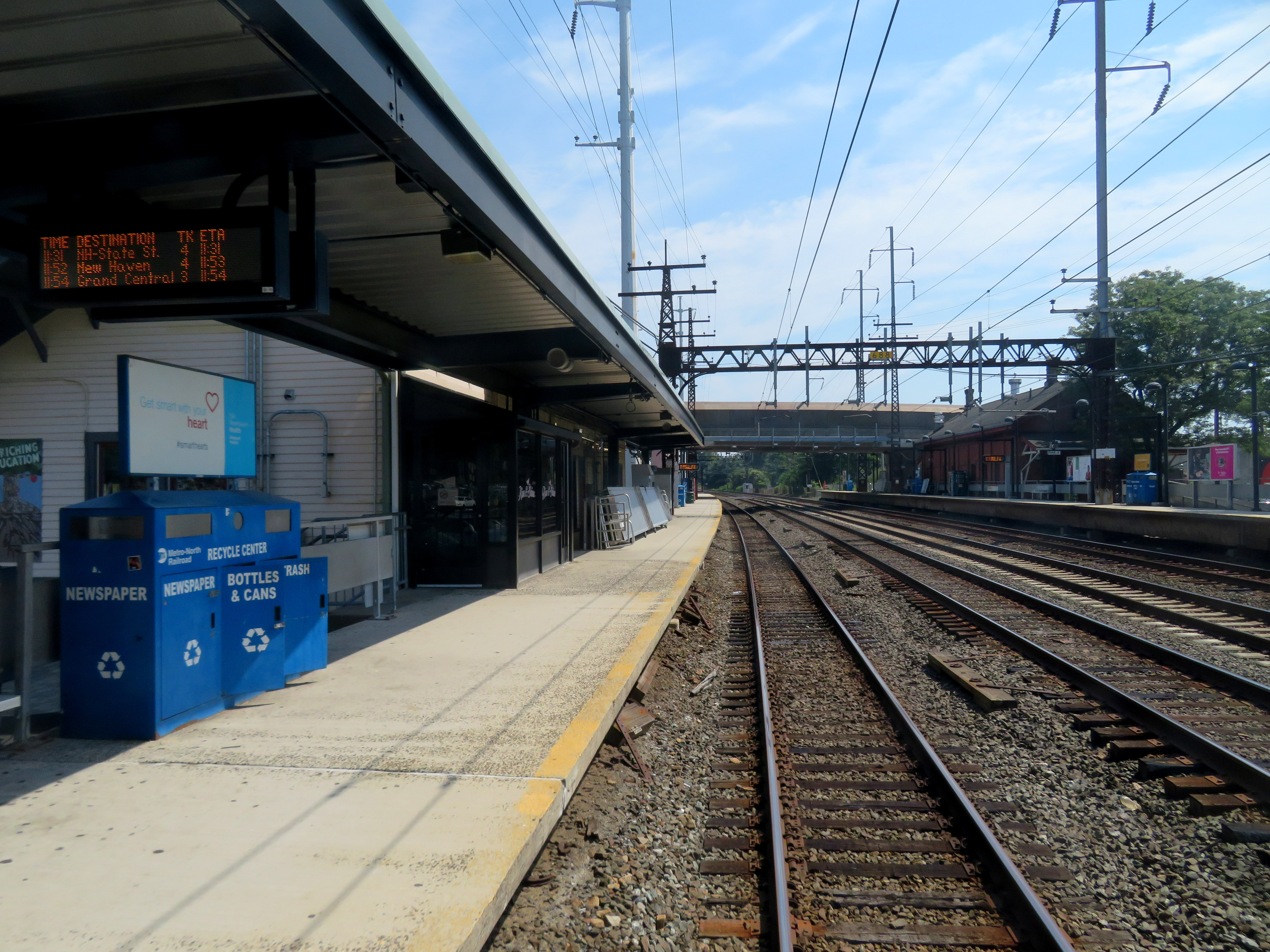
The Fairfield Metro-North station platform, tracks, and overpass

Fairfield is traversed by U.S. 1, Interstate 95, and the Merritt Parkway. It has three Metro-North Railroad stations, Fairfield–Black Rock (formerly named Fairfield Metro), Fairfield and Southport. The town is served by several public bus lines of the Greater Bridgeport Transit Authority.

== Places of worship ==
- St. Anthony of Padua Church
- Trinity Baptist Church
- Greenfield Hill Congregational Church – Congregational Church
- First Church Congregational – UCC
- Southport Congregational Church
- St. Paul's Episcopal Church – Episcopal Church (United States)
- St. Timothy's Episcopal Church – Episcopal Church (United States)
- Trinity Episcopal Church – Episcopal Church (United States)
- Fairfield Grace United Methodist Church – United Methodist Church
- Black Rock Congregational Church – non-denominational evangelical
- Our Saviour's Lutheran Church – Lutheran Church (ELCA)
- First Presbyterian Church of Fairfield – Presbyterian Church
- Holy Cross Roman Catholic Church
- Our Lady of the Assumption
- St. Pius X Church
- St. Thomas Roman Catholic Church
- Chabad of Fairfield
- Or Hadash

== Notable people ==
- William Burnett Benton (1900–1973), former U.S. senator
- Leonard Bernstein (1918–1990), conductor, composer, musician
- James Blake (born 1979), professional tennis player
- Julius Boros (1920–1994), professional golfer, winner of 18 PGA tour events including the 1952 and 1963 U.S. Open and 1968 PGA Championship
- Aaron Burr Sr. (1716–1757), native, clergyman, educator, and father of Vice President Aaron Burr
- John Byrne (born 1950) comic book artist and author
- Ann Shaw Carter (1922–2005) first woman to be a commercial helicopter pilot
- Kenton Clarke (born 1951), CEO, trumpet player, Buglers Hall of Fame and Drum Corps Hall of Fame
- Susan Cooper (born 1935) author of children's sequence The Dark Is Rising
- Hume Cronyn (1911–2003), actor, Lifeboat, Cocoon
- Michael J. Daly (1924–2008), World War II Medal of Honor recipient
- T. F. Gilroy Daly, attorney and federal judge, born in Fairfield
- C. Douglas Dillon, Secretary of US Treasury, ambassador to France, lived in Fairfield c. 2002–2003
- David L. Downie, author and professor of politics and environment policy at Fairfield University
- Keir Dullea, actor, 2001: A Space Odyssey
- Dick Durrell (1925–2008), founding publisher of People magazine, adjunct professor at Sacred Heart University
- Timothy Dwight IV (1752–1817), Congregationalist minister, author, president of Yale College; pastor for 12 years at Greenfield Hill Church
- Margaret Morrison, granddaughter of Andrew Carnegie
- Sophie Flay (1996–), co-anchor of World News Now and Good Morning America First Look for ABC News
- Tatiana Foroud, internationally recognized genetic researcher
- Chris Frantz and Tina Weymouth, founding members of Talking Heads and Tom Tom Club
- Robert Greenberger (born 1958), writer, editor and Fairfield politician
- J. J. Henry, PGA golfer, 2006 Ryder Cup team member
- Paul Hogan, aka "Crocodile Dundee", actor, lived many years in Fairfield with wife Linda Kozlowski
- Don Imus, radio personality, past resident in Southport
- Eliot A. Jardines, Assistant Deputy Director of National Intelligence for Open source intelligence
- Oliver Burr Jennings, Exxon (Standard Oil) founder
- Pat Jordan, sportswriter and acclaimed author of A False Spring, ranked #37 on Sports Illustrated's Top 100 Sports Books of All Time
- Linda Kozlowski, actress, born in Fairfield
- David LaChapelle, born in Fairfield, photographer and director
- Jonathan Lewis, biomedical researcher, cancer drug developer
- Justin Long, actor, Jeepers Creepers, Ed
- Roger Ludlow, town founder
- Pauline Bradford Mackie (1873–1956), writer of historical fiction
- Florence Lewis May, art historian
- John Mayer, Grammy-winning singer-songwriter and guitarist
- Bradley B. Meeker, Minnesota Territorial Supreme Court justice
- Brian Monahan, US Navy rear admiral and Attending Physician of the United States Congress
- Matt Morgan, professional wrestler, American Gladiator and actor
- Anne M. Mulcahy, chairman, Xerox Corporation
- Charles Nagy, former MLB pitcher for Cleveland Indians
- Joe Namath, New York Jets quarterback, Hall of Famer, past resident
- Henry Fairfield Osborn, (1857–1935) geologist, paleontologist, eugenicist
- Dan Remmes, actor/writer, book writer of Grumpy Old Men: The Musical
- Jason Robards, actor, lived in Southport
- Richard Rodgers, composer of more than 900 songs and 43 Broadway musicals, Rodgers and Hammerstein, Rodgers and Hart
- Philip Rubin, CEO emeritus of Haskins Laboratories and a former White House science adviser
- Meg Ryan, actress, Sleepless in Seattle, When Harry Met Sally..., born in Fairfield
- Chris Sarandon and Joanna Gleason, actors
- Gold Selleck Silliman, Revolutionary War general
- Samuel Smedley, privateer in Revolutionary War
- Howard Sosin, founder of AIG Financial Products, presently investor
- Jonathan Sturges, delegate to the Continental Congress and member of the United States House of Representatives
- Gene Tierney, actress, Laura, Leave Her to Heaven; attended Unquowa School in Fairfield
- Lee Tilghman, former wellness influencer
- Brian Torff, jazz musician, composer, head of Fairfield University music program
- Raviv Ullman, star of Phil of the Future
- Franco Ventriglia, opera singer, Fairfield native
- Jeffrey P. von Arx, president of Fairfield University
- Robert Penn Warren, author and poet
- Robert Waterman, clipper ship captain who sailed to California and named Fairfield, California after this city
- Michael Weatherly, actor, plays Special Agent Anthony DiNozzo in series NCIS
- Jack Welch, former CEO of General Electric, former town resident
- Bob Wright, chairman of NBC for 20 years
- Mabel Osgood Wright, author and founder of Connecticut Audubon Society (Birdcraft Museum in Fairfield)
- Julie Benko, actress; attended Fairfield Ludlowe High School in Fairfield
