= Fairfield Beach (Fairfield) =

Coordinates: 41.1218°N 73.2573°W

Fairfield Beach is a neighborhood of Fairfield, Connecticut.

== Location ==
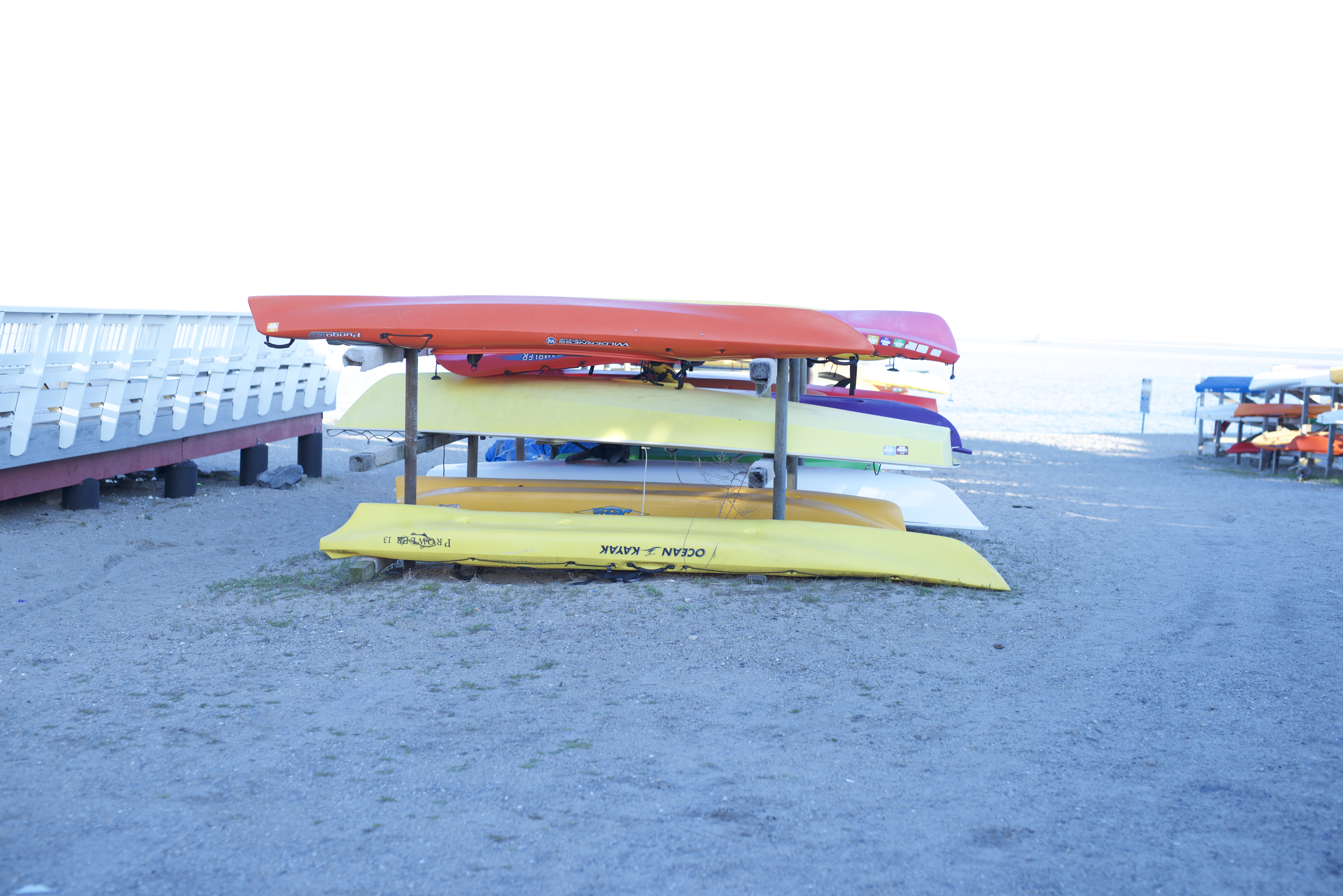
Entrance to the beach by the pavilion.

Fairfield Beach is located to the south of downtown Fairfield, and the neighborhood extends south from Old Post Road to the Long Island Sound. The neighborhood originally held a variety of income levels, with small family farms such as the Hauser farm on the corner of Reef Road and Charles Street on one end of the spectrum, and small summer cottages on the beach at the other. While only a few families lived there year-round in the early and mid-twentieth century the neighborhood began growing in popularity for year-round residents throughout the 1970s and 1980s.

A recent surge in the neighborhood's popularity has led to a building boom, as many of the smaller old homes have been torn down and replaced with the larger new homes. Many of the newer homes have been constructed in a distinctive architectural style known as "Nantucket" or "beach" style.

Residents of the neighborhood are represented by several neighborhood organizations, including the Fairfield Beach Residents Association, which represents the entire beach area, and the Fair Acres Association, which represents residents residing within the blocks between Rowland Road and Penfield Road.

Traditionally, many Fairfield University students have lived in the neighborhood, and although their numbers have decreased in recent years as property values and rents have increased, there continues to be a significant student presence, leading to occasional conflict between students and permanent residents.

The area includes Jennings Beach and Penfield Beach; the Veterans Park; and the Fairfield Beach Club and the South Benson Marina.

There is a local school, Roger Sherman Elementary.

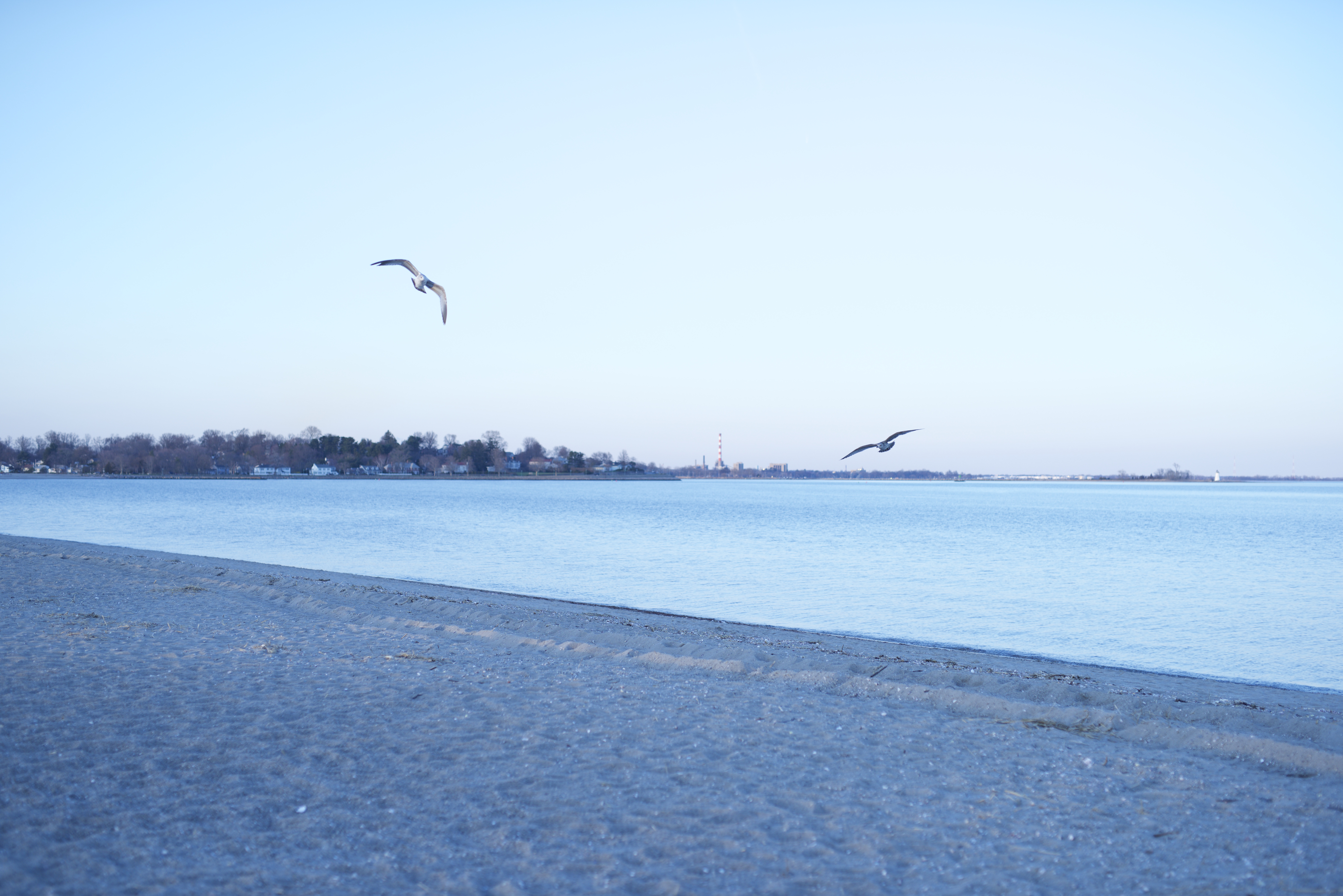
Seagulls on the beach.

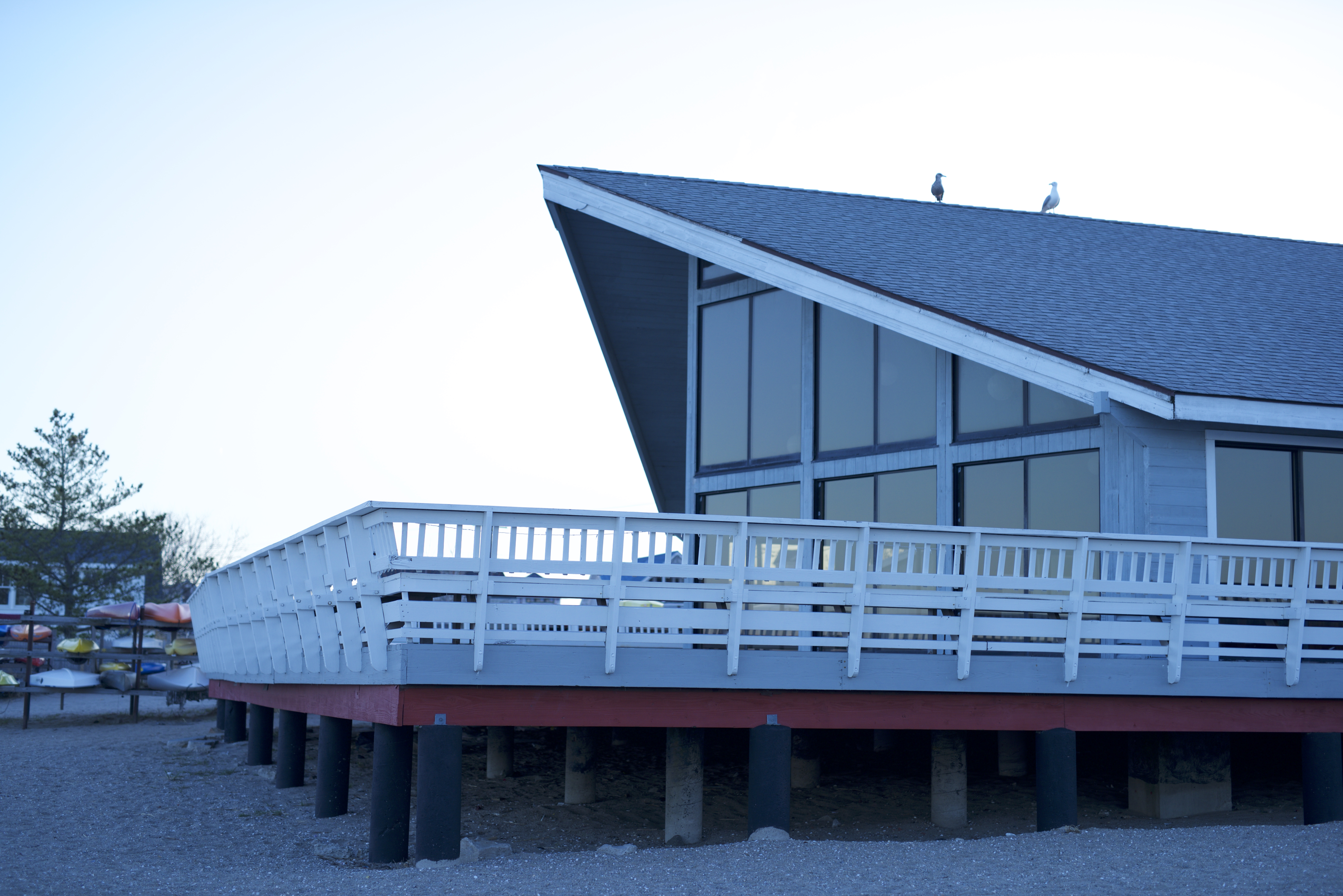
Pavilion at Fairfield beach.

== Gallery ==
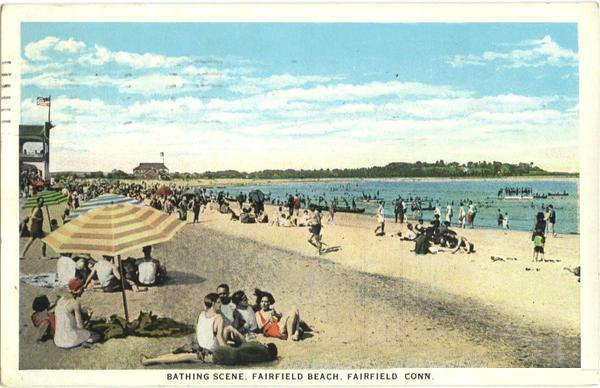
Postcard from 1932 showing bathers at Fairfield Beach, Connecticut

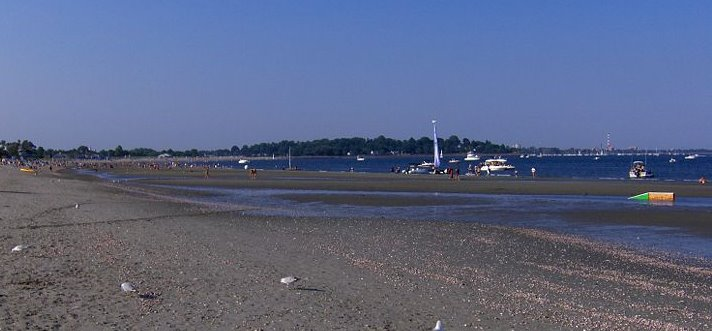
A recent view of Fairfield Beach

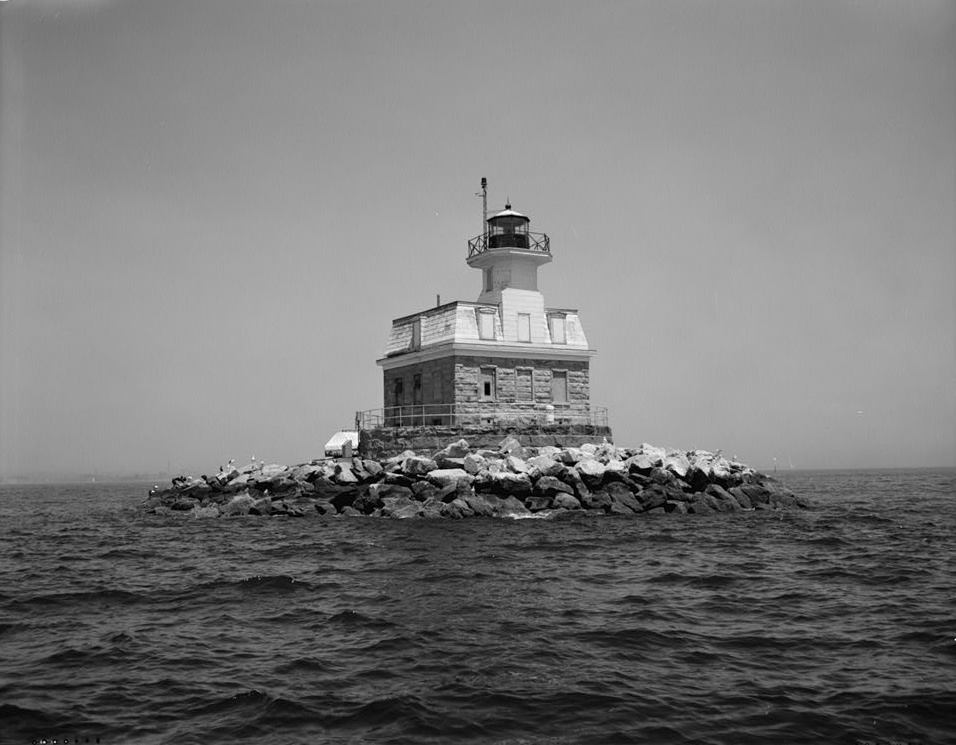
Penfield Reef Lighthouse is located in the Long Island Sound off the coast of Fairfield Beach

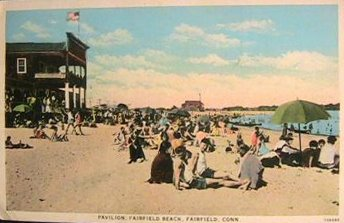
1915 postcard of Fairfield Beach showing what is now Penfield Pavilion

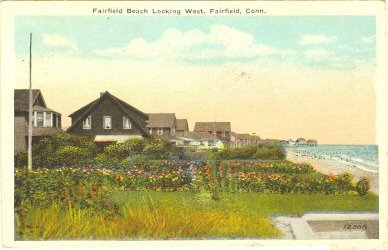
A 1921 postcard showing Fairfield Beach

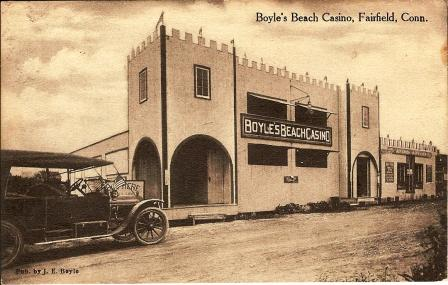
Boyle's Beach Casino, a lively dance hall, was located at the corner of Reef Road and Fairfield Beach Road until it burned down in 1915
