= Fairfield Country Day School =

- Fairfield, Connecticut; USA

Information
- Type: Private, all-boys
- Motto: "We Are Judged by Our Deeds. Meet the moment. "
- Established: 1936
- Founder: Lawrence W. Gregory
- Head of School: Margot Pearce
- Associate Head of School: Maureen Bartolomeo
- Faculty: 50
- Grades: Kindergarten through Ninth Grade. Lower School grades K - 3; Middle School grades 4 - 6; Upper School grades - 7-9
- Gender: All Boys
- Enrollment: 220
- Colors: Blue & White
- Mascot: Skyhawk
- Nickname: FCDS
- Yearbook: The Blazer
- Website: www.fairfieldcountryday.org

Fairfield Country Day School (FCDS) is a private, all-boys day school in Fairfield, Connecticut, United States. Founded in 1936 by Laurence W. Gregory, the School prepares boys in Grades K-9 for secondary school success.

== Athletics ==
Athletics are important at FCDS. Lessons in sportsmanship, teamwork, competition, and how to win and lose gracefully are an integral part the program. All students participate in either team or intramural sports. K-3 students partake in sports during the regular school day. Beginning in the fourth grade, students take part in sports after school. Students in fourth and fifth grades play on intramural Blue and White teams which include football, soccer, ice hockey, basketball, baseball and lacrosse. Sixth grade students participate in interscholastic sports against other schools in the area. In grades seven through nine, boys can try out for and join junior varsity and varsity teams that compete in the Fairchester Athletic Association. These sports include soccer, flag football, cross country, ice hockey, basketball, baseball, lacrosse and squash.

== Accreditation ==
FCDS is accredited by the Connecticut Association of Independent Schools and approved by the Connecticut State Department of Education. FCDS is also a member of the National Association of Independent Schools, the Fairchester Independent Schools, and the International Boys' Schools Coalition (IBSC).

== Notable alumni ==
- Christopher Ross, sculptor, designer and collector
- Michael Weatherly(attended), actor best known on television for his roles in NCIS and Dark Angel
