= Juvenile Review Board =

A Juvenile Review Board or (JRB) is a committee that has been formally designated to review juvenile court cases in the State of Connecticut.

No formal Court or Governors' constitutional specification has been legislated as of the present date. Thereby, the operation of each JRB is basically overseen and conducted according to each individual board's own jurisprudence, its current members, and police to establish the eligibility guidelines for referral.

In Connecticut, there is a point of contact for the officially designated JRB in each city and town. The State of Connecticut's Chief Juvenile Prosecutor, Francis Carino, has provided assistance in the development of multiple JRB's. Carino has also presented data tables to express their results.

== Advantages of JRB ==
The advantages of a JRB include; no lawyers, minimal delays, appropriate services are offered to the child and family, entire matter is dealt with at the community level, and the child does not end up with a juvenile record.

== Disadvantages of JRB ==
A JRB has the drawback of preventing a kid accused of a crime from being present while the committee decides on an appropriate penalty.Punishments may require that the child perform a specified number of community service hours, attend counseling, participate in a drug/alcohol treatment program, make restitution, apologize to the victim, do research and write a paper on a subject relevant to the incident, or anything else the JRB believes would be helpful.
