= Unquowa School =

The Unquowa School

Location
- 981 Stratfield Road, Fairfield, Connecticut; United States
- Coordinates: 41.19535°N 73.23273°W

Information
- Type: Private School
- Motto: "The Future is in Our Care"
- Opened: 1917
- Principal: Sharon Lauer
- Grades: K-8
- Enrollment: 200
- Website: unquowa.org

The Unquowa School (U.S.) is a private K-8 school that was established in 1917 by a group of parents in Fairfield, Connecticut.

By 2011 the school began a program where a chef bakes bread on-site and uses ingredients originating from farms in the vicinity.

== Notable alumni ==
- David Mumford - mathematician
- Gene Tierney - actress
