= Ash Creek (Connecticut) =

River in Fairfield County, Connecticut, United States

Coordinates: 41°08′33″N 73°13′56″W

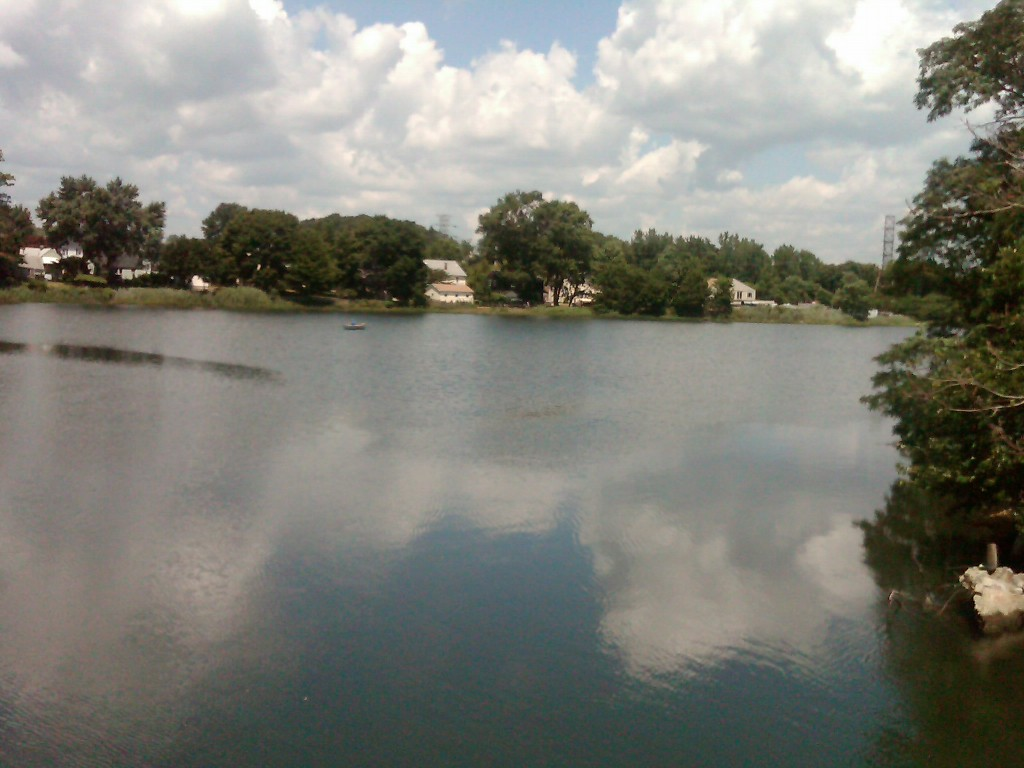
Ash Creek north of Route 130.

Ash Creek is a tidal creek and intertidal wetland in Fairfield County, Connecticut that serves as a border between the city of Bridgeport and the town of Fairfield. It is the last salt water estuary in the area, extending from Long Island Sound and up the Rooster River.

== History ==
The area was known on colonial maps as the Uncoway or Fairfield River. Ash Creek has served as Fairfield's main harbor since the founding of the town in 1639.

The name Ash Creek was given to the body of water after Fairfield Center was burned to the ground by the British during the Revolutionary War. Due to wind direction that day a majority of the ashes were deposited in "Ash Creek."

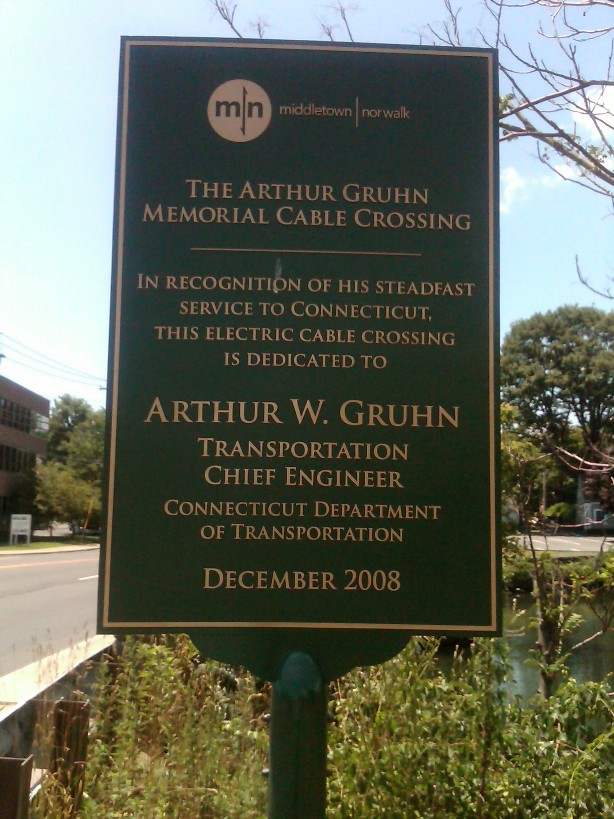
Arthur Gruhn Memorial Cable Crossing plaque

=== Memorial plaque ===
The Arthur Gruhn Memorial Cable Crossing plaque was erected on Connecticut Route 130 at the Bridgeport-Fairfield town line on March 24, 2009. It is in recognition of ConnDOT Chief Engineer Gruhn's work by Connecticut Light & Power and the United Illuminating Company for his work allowing for the Middletown-Norwalk transmission line upgrade. Engineer Gruhn's work provided for a practical electric system upgrade while environmentally preserving Ash Creek.

== Public use and preservation area ==
The town of Fairfield began accumulating land in 1931 for Ash Creek Open Space, which includes a public access (handicap accessible) boat launch at the mouth of the river. Fishing, crabbing, picnicking, walking trails, and other activities are permitted. The preservation area is approximately 40 acres (160,000 m^{2}) in size.

=== Other uses ===
Ash Creek had a namesake restaurant in Black Rock, called the Ash Creek Saloon.

== See also ==
- List of rivers of Connecticut
