= EHS =

EHS may refer to:

== Education ==
- Early Head Start, an American educational program
- EHS Institute, a teacher training program in Hardwick, Massachusetts, United States

=== Schools ===
==== Disambiguation ====
- East High School (disambiguation)
- Eastern High School (disambiguation)
- Edison High School (disambiguation)
- Elkins High School (disambiguation)
- Enterprise High School (disambiguation)
- Episcopal High School (disambiguation)
- Essex High School (disambiguation)
- Eureka High School (disambiguation)
- Evergreen High School (disambiguation)

==== Australia ====
- Engadine High School, Sydney, New South Wales

==== Canada ====
- Esquimalt High School, Esquimalt, British Columbia

==== India ====
- Edrakpur High School, Birbhum district, West Bengal

==== South Africa ====
- Ermelo High School, Ermelo, Mpumalanga

==== United States ====
- Eagan High School, Eagan, Minnesota
- Eagle High School, Eagle, Idaho
- Eagle Hill School, Hardwick, Massachusetts
- Eaglecrest High School, Centennial, Colorado
- Eastmont High School, East Wenatchee, Washington
- Ellendale High School (Ellendale School District), Ellendale, North Dakota
- Ellensburg High School, Ellensburg, Washington
- Elsinore High School, Wildomar, California
- Emmaus High School, Emmaus, Pennsylvania
- Empire High School, Tucson, Arizona
- Escondido High School, Escondido, California
- Etna High School, Etna, California

== Health and medicine ==
- EHS Today, an occupational safety and health magazine
- Electromagnetic hypersensitivity, claimed sensitivity to mobile phone towers etc.
- Emergency Health Services, in Nova Scotia, Canada
- Emergency Hospital Service, in the United Kingdom during World War II
  - Emergency Hospital Service (Scotland)
- Environment, health and safety
- Exploding head syndrome
- Exertional heat stroke; see Heat stroke
- Erection Hardness Score

== Science and technology ==
- Electronic hook switch, in connecting a wireless headset to a phone
- European Home Systems Protocol, a communication protocol using power line communication
- Microsoft Exchange Hosted Services
- Engelbreth-Holm-Swarm matrix, extracellular protein mixture known as Matrigel

== Other uses ==
- Early Harvest Scheme, a trade agreement
- Ecclesiastical History Society
- Economic History Society
- Eternal Haunted Summer, an American literary magazine
