= Lambert & Bunnell =

American architectural firm

Practice information
- Founders: Edward R. Lambert; Rufus W. Bunnell
- Founded: 1860
- Dissolved: 1901
- Location: Bridgeport, Connecticut

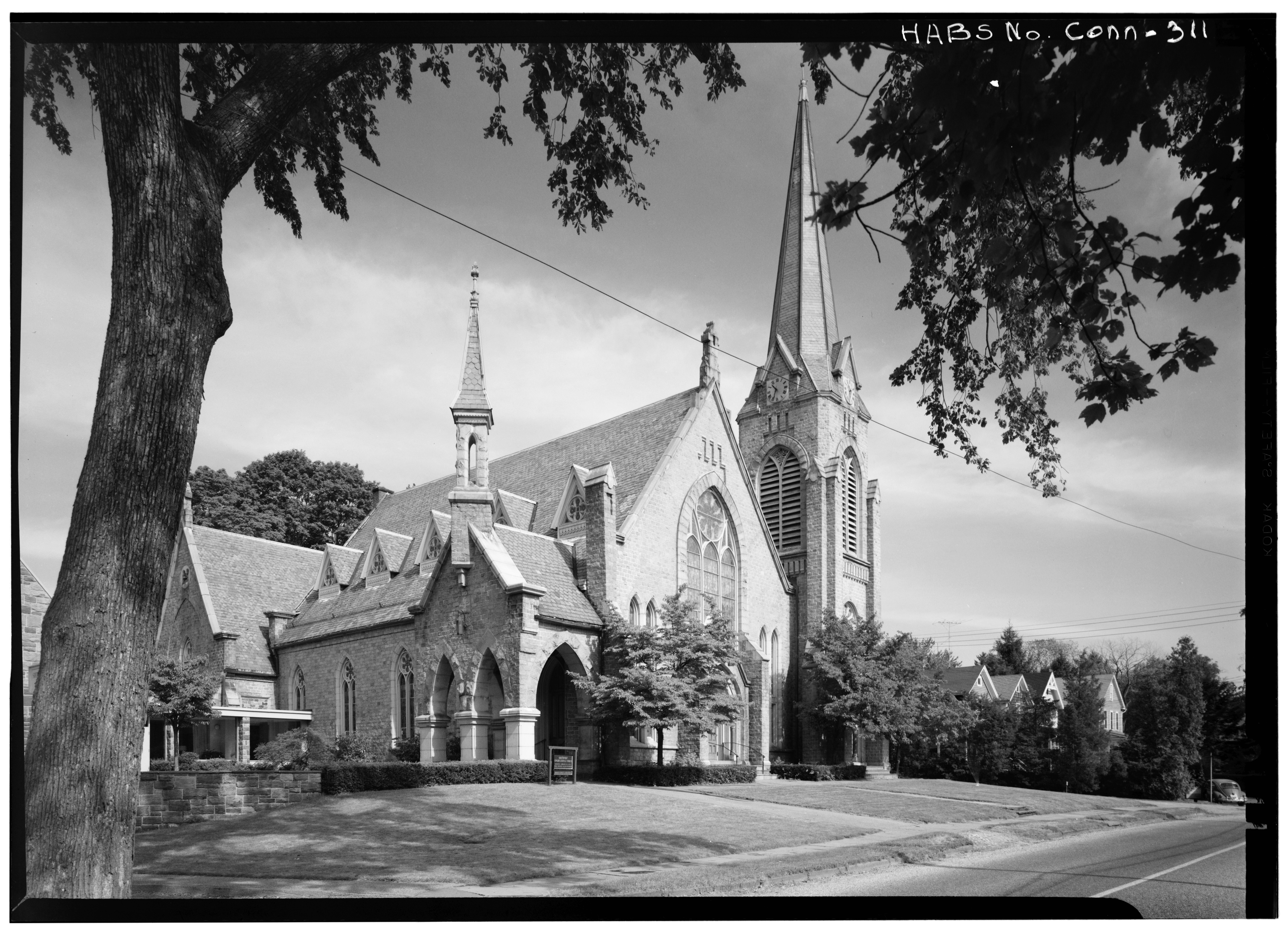
The Congregational Church in Southport, Connecticut, built in 1874 and the largest of the buildings designed by Lambert & Bunnell in Southport.

Lambert & Bunnell was a long-lived American architectural firm from Bridgeport, Connecticut, in business from 1860 to 1901. It was established by Edward R. Lambert (1834–1904) and Rufus W. Bunnell (1835–1909).

== Founders and history ==
The founder of the firm, Edward Richard Lambert, was born on February 10, 1834, in Milford to Edward Rodolphus Lambert, a surveyor, and Eliza (Boothe) Lambert. He worked for his father and for Bridgeport architect Albert C. Nash, with whom he studied architecture. Circa 1856, when Nash left for Milwaukee, Lambert opened his own architect's office in Bridgeport. In 1858 he was joined by drafter Rufus W. Bunnell, who had worked alongside Lambert in Nash's office in 1854, though Bunnell would go south soon afterwards. Upon his return in 1860, they formed Lambert & Bunnell, which would be Bridgeport's major architecture firm for many years.

Before permanently joining Lambert, Rufus William Bunnell worked around the country. He was born February 11, 1835, in Bridgeport, to William Rufus Bunnell and Sarah E. (Haight) Bunnell. After an education in the local schools, in 1852 he joined the office of Chauncey Graham, a local architect, as a student, moving to that of A. C. Nash in 1854 when Graham moved to New Jersey. In 1855 Bunnell joined Graham in his new office in Trenton, but after a few months moved west to Toledo, Ohio, where he worked with Frank J. Scott, an early local architect. In January 1857 they formed a brief partnership, Scott & Bunnell, but in early 1858 Bunnell was back east, working for Woollett & Ogden in Albany before joining Lambert as a drafter. In 1859 Bunnell went south, joining contractor James F. Post of Wilmington, North Carolina, as his assistant. Bunnell was responsible for the design of the facade of one of Post's best known works, the Bellamy Mansion, begun that year. In 1860, becoming uncomfortable in the heightened tensions in the south in the buildup to the Civil War, Bunnell packed his things and took what he claimed was a temporary trip to the north. This trip proved to be permanent. After ensuring on behalf of Post that northern suppliers for the Bellamy project were fulfilling their orders, he returned to Bridgeport and joined Lambert to form Lambert & Bunnell.

With the exception of Bunnell's year in the Union Army in 1862–63, Lambert and Bunnell remained associated until 1901, when Lambert fell ill and retired. Bunnell continued to practice in a limited capacity from his home in Stratford. Lambert died February 23, 1904, and Bunnell died February 21, 1909.

== Legacy ==
The works of Lambert & Bunnell were concentrated in and around Bridgeport, with some projects in more distant parts of the state and in New Jersey. Most of their work was in the popular styles of the day, including the Italianate, Second Empire and later the Queen Anne styles. Several of their buildings have been listed on the United States National Register of Historic Places, though one has since been demolished, and others contribute to listed historic districts.

== Architectural works ==
- 1861 - House for Moses Bulkley, (Note: A contributing property to the Southport Historic District, NRHP-listed in 1971.) 176 Main St, Southport, Connecticut
- 1864 - House for Peter L. Perry, (Note: A contributing property to the East Bridgeport Historic District, NRHP-listed in 1979.) 512 E Washington Ave, Bridgeport, Connecticut
- 1866 - Bethesda Mission, 540 E Washington Ave, Bridgeport, Connecticut
- 1868 - House for Mrs. Benjamin Pomeroy, 658 Pequot Rd, Southport, Connecticut
- 1870 - Fairfield County Jail, (Note: NRHP-listed in 1985.) 1106 North Ave, Bridgeport, Connecticut
  - Demolished 1997
- 1871 - House for Mrs. Zalmon Wakeman, 418 Harbor Rd, Southport, Connecticut
- 1874 - Southport Congregational Church, 524 Pequot Rd, Southport, Connecticut
- 1883 - Bridgeport Hospital, 267 Grant St, Bridgeport, Connecticut
  - Demolished c.1959
- 1884 - Christ Episcopal Church, Post & Burr Rds, Westport, Connecticut
  - Demolished
- 1887 - House for Daniel Robert, (Note: NRHP-listed in 2008.) 25 West End Avenue, Somerville, New Jersey
- 1891 - D. M. Hunt Library, (Note: A contributing property to the Falls Village District, NRHP-listed in 1979.) 63 Main St, Falls Village, Connecticut

== Gallery of architectural works ==
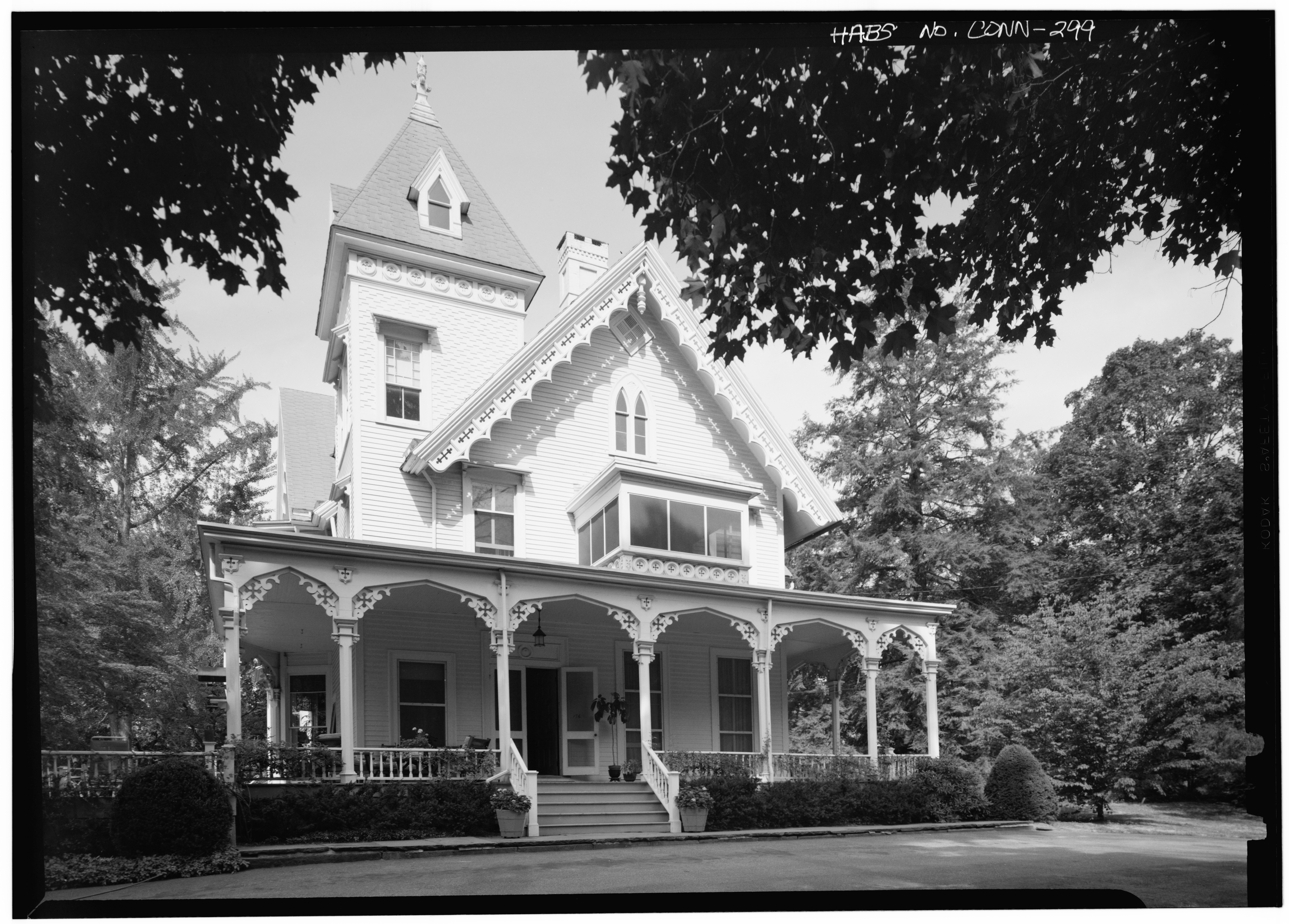
House for Moses Bulkley, Southport, Connecticut, 1861.

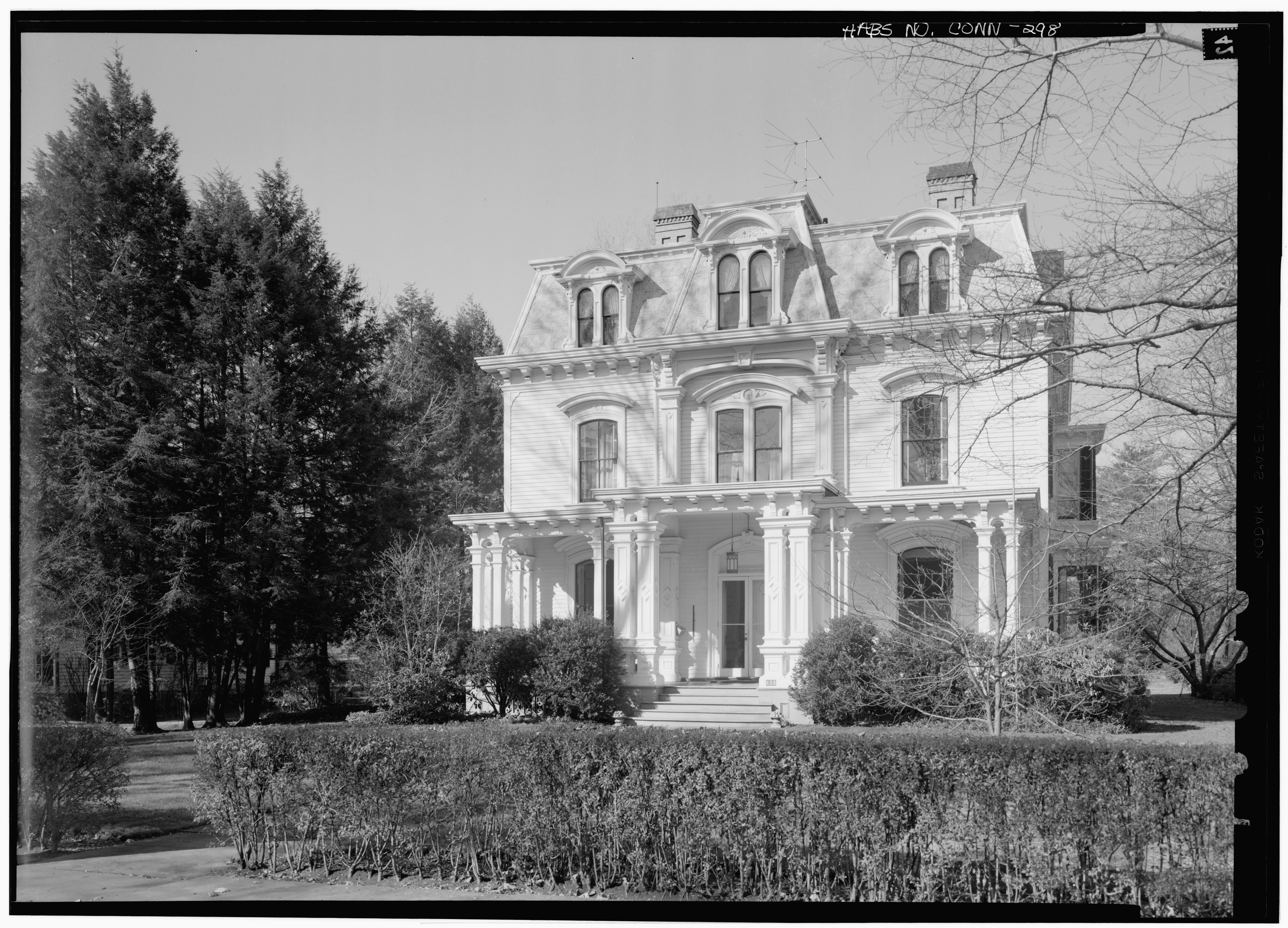
House for Mrs. Benjamin Pomeroy, Southport, Connecticut, 1868.

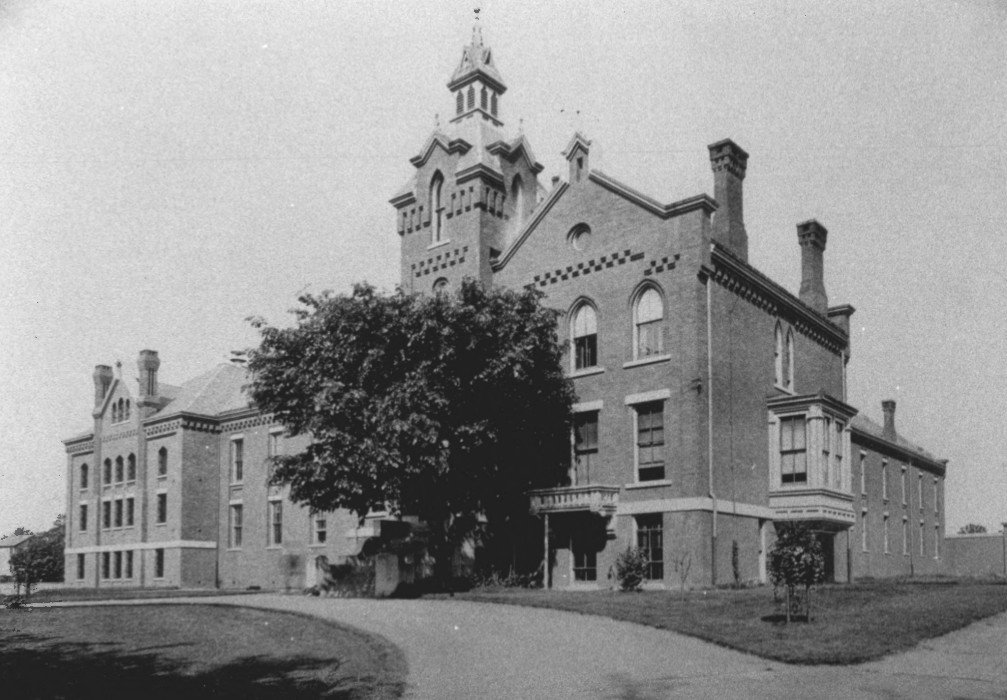
Fairfield County Jail, Bridgeport, Connecticut, 1870-71.

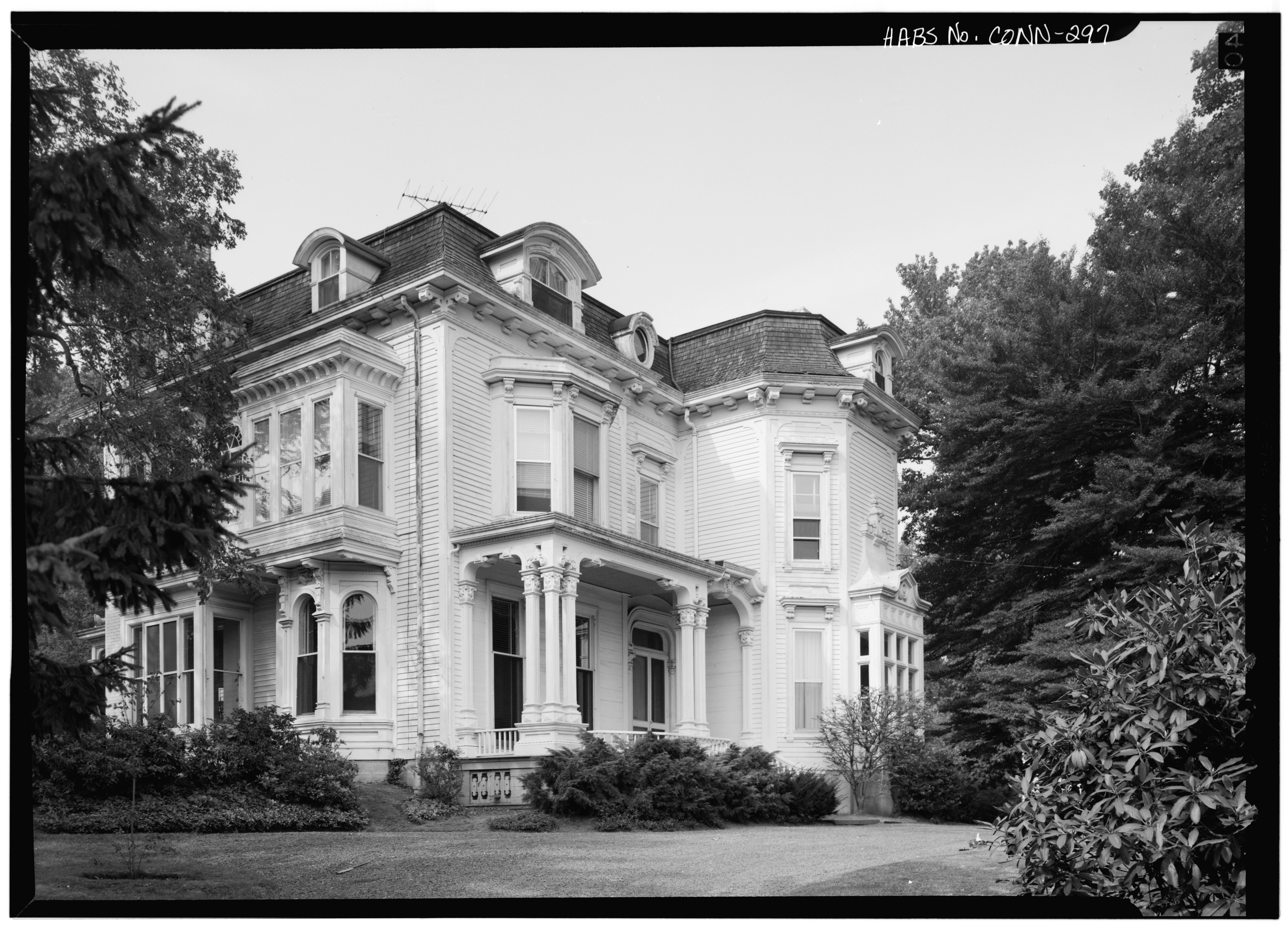
House for Mrs. Zalmon Wakeman, Southport, Connecticut, 1871.

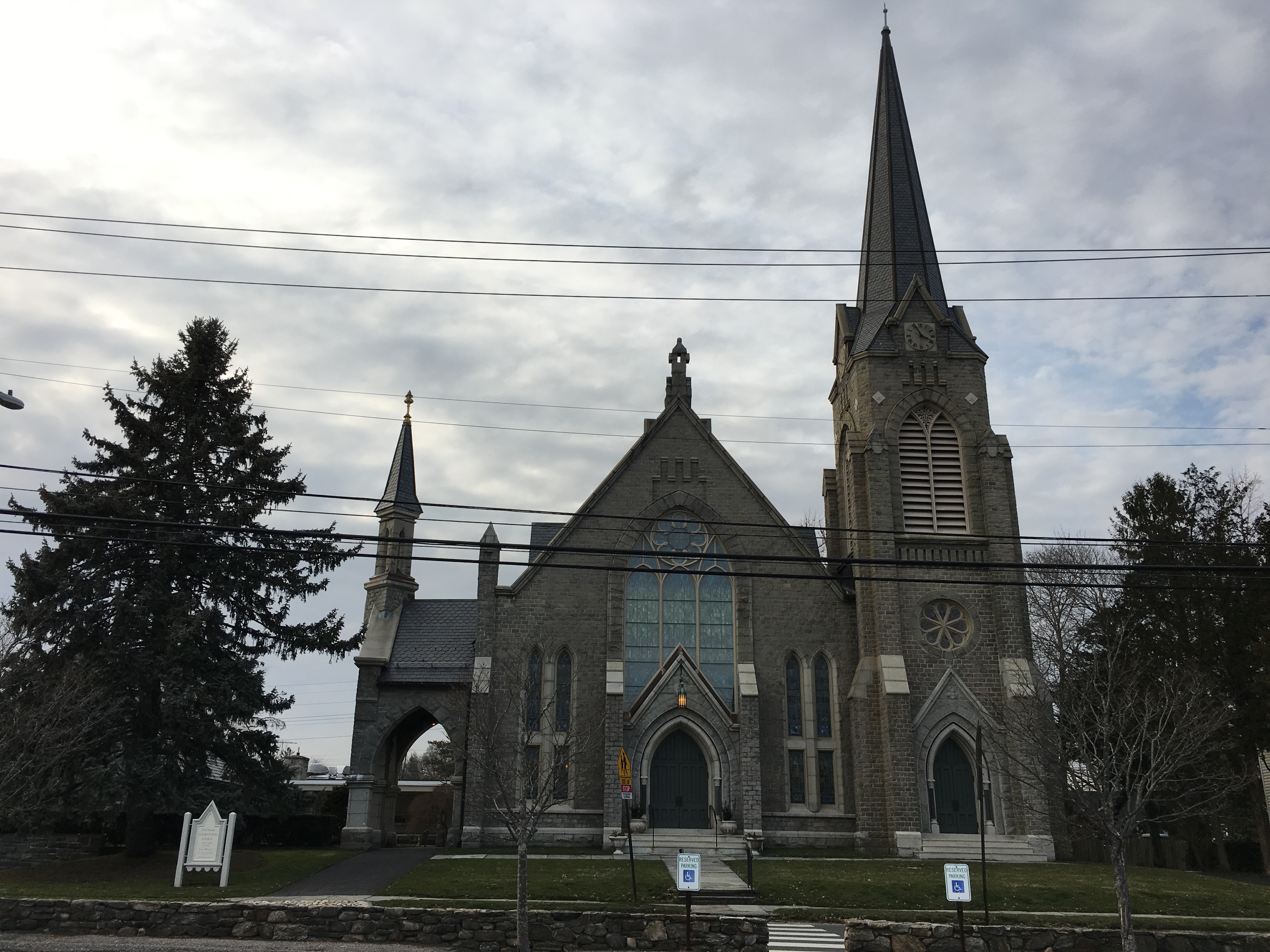
Southport Congregational Church, Southport, Connecticut, 1874.

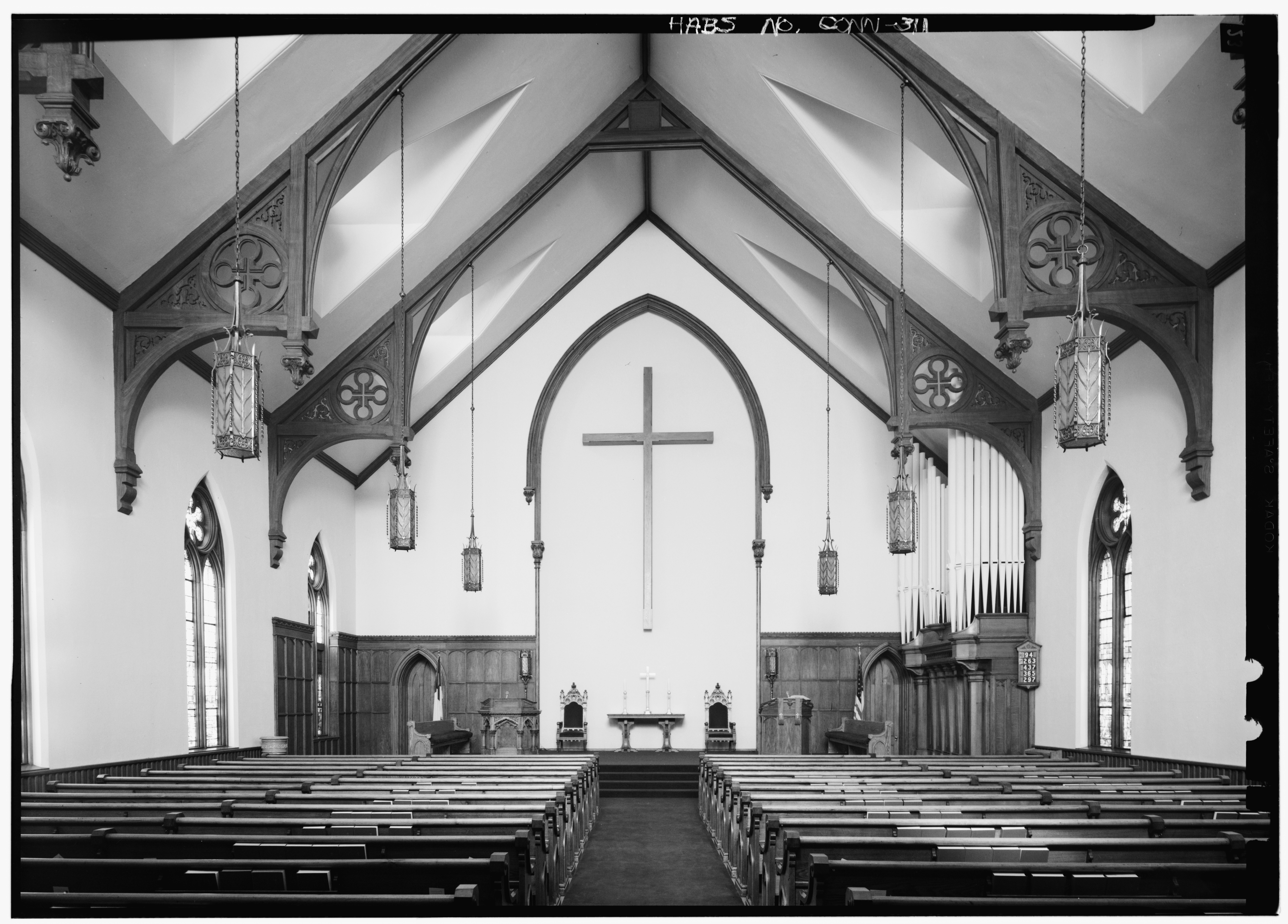
Interior view of the Southport Congregational Church, Southport, Connecticut, 1874.

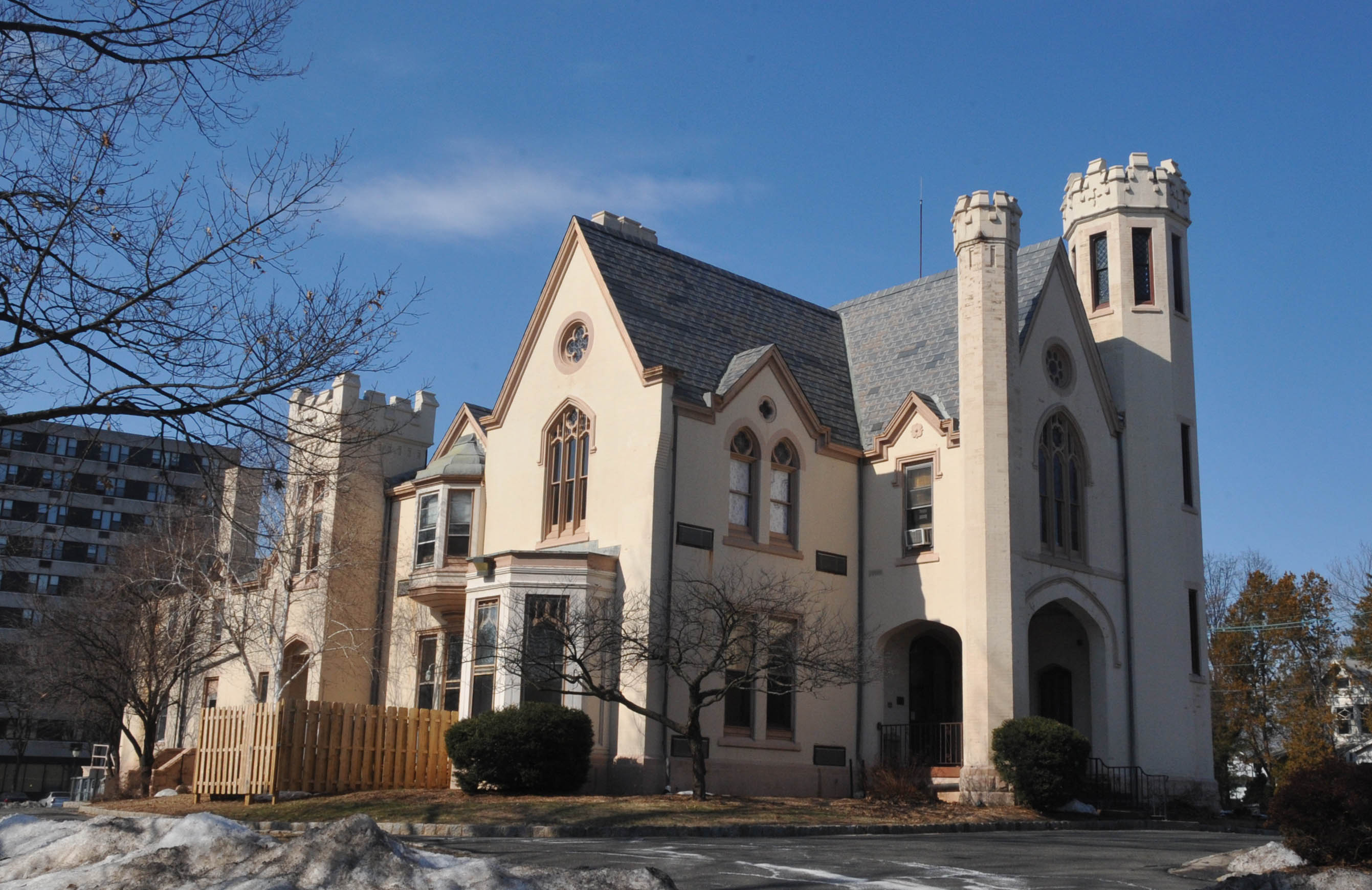
House for Daniel Robert, Somerville, New Jersey, 1887-88.

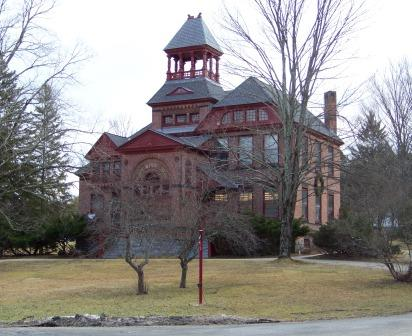
D. M. Hunt Library, Falls Village, Connecticut, 1891.
