= Edison High School =

Edison High School may refer to one of the following American schools:

Listed alphabetically by state, then city

- Edison High School (Fresno, California), Fresno, California
- Edison High School (Huntington Beach, California), Huntington Beach, California
- Edison High School (Stockton, California), Stockton, California
- Edison Junior-Senior High School, Yoder, Colorado
- Miami Edison High School, Miami, Florida
- Edison Regional Gifted Center, Chicago, Illinois
- Thomas A. Edison Junior-Senior High School, Lake Station, Indiana
- Thomas Edison High School of Technology, Silver Spring, Maryland
- Edison High School (Minnesota), Minneapolis, Minnesota
- Thomas A. Edison High School (Queens), Jamaica, Queens, New York
- Thomas A. Edison High School (Elmira Heights), Elmira Heights, New York
- Edison High School (New Jersey), Edison, New Jersey
- Edison High School (Milan, Ohio), Milan, Ohio
- Edison High School (Richmond, Ohio), Richmond, Ohio
- Edison Preparatory School, Tulsa, Oklahoma
- Edison High School (Portland, Oregon) (1973–present), Portland, Oregon
- Thomas A. Edison High School (Oregon) (1935–1947), Portland, Oregon
- Thomas A. Edison High School (Pennsylvania), Philadelphia, Pennsylvania
- Edison High School (San Antonio), Texas
- Thomas A. Edison High School (Fairfax County, Virginia), Alexandria, Virginia
- Burlington-Edison High School, Burlington, Washington
