= Episcopal School =

Episcopal School may refer to:

- Episcopal School of Acadiana, Louisiana
- Episcopal School of Dallas, Texas
- Episcopal School of Jacksonville, Florida

== See also ==
- Episcopal High School (disambiguation)
- List of colleges and seminaries affiliated with the Episcopal Church
