= Southport, Connecticut =

Census-designated place in Connecticut, United States

Southport
- Census-designated place
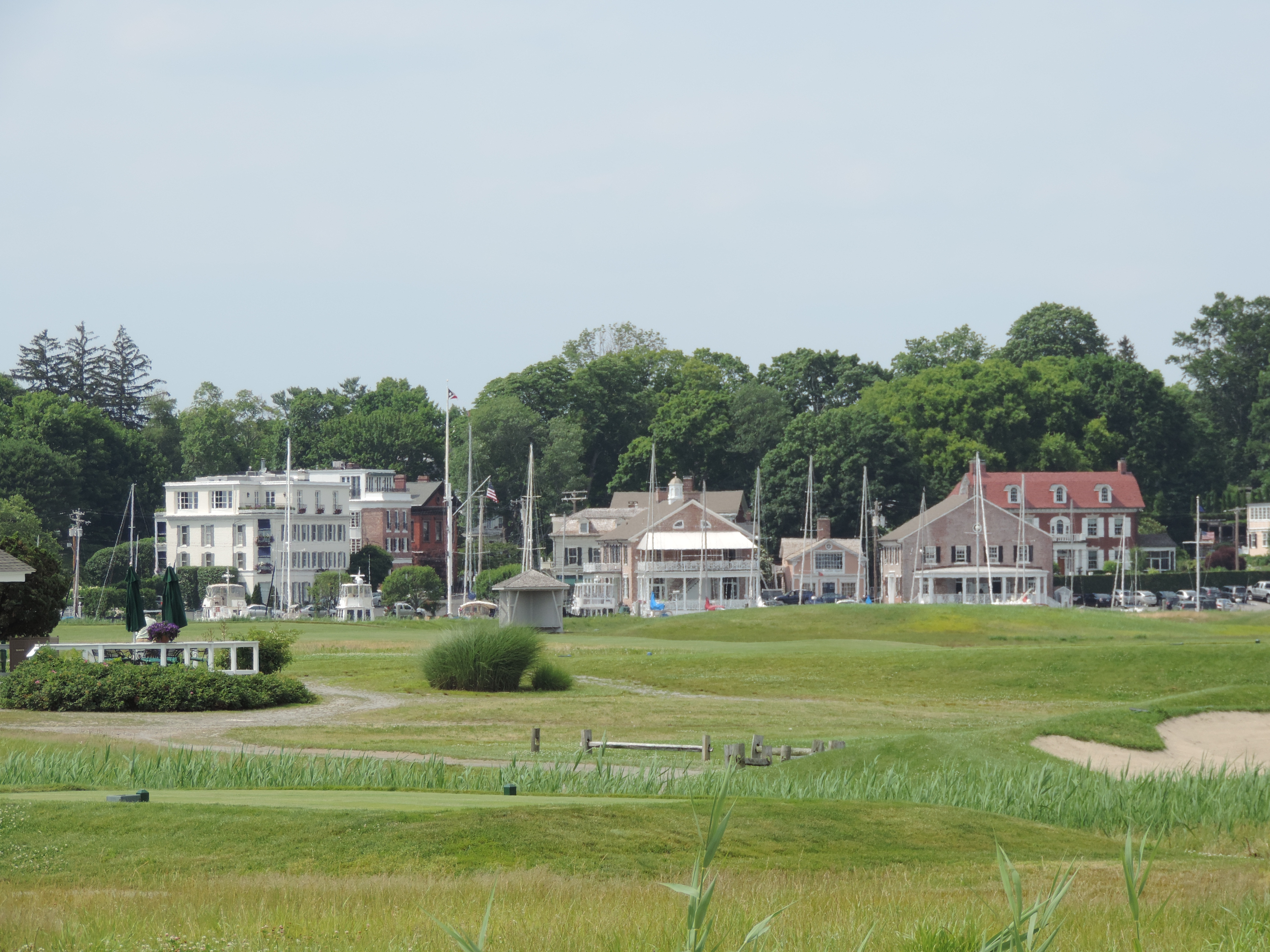
- Southport Harbor seen from neighboring Sasco Hill

- Coordinates: 41°7′55″N 73°17′4″W
- Country: United States
- U.S. state: Connecticut
- County: Fairfield
- Region: CT Metropolitan
- Town: Fairfield
- Settled: 1639
- Incorporated (borough): 1831
- Disincorporated: 1854

Area
  - Total: 0.992 sq mi (2.57 km^{2})
  - Land: 0.858 sq mi (2.22 km^{2})
  - Water: 0.134 sq mi (0.35 km^{2})

Population (2020)
  - Total: 1,710
  - Density: 1,990/sq mi (770/km^{2})
  - Summer (DST): EDT
- ZIP Code: 06890
- Area code: 203/475
- FIPS code: 09-71040
- GNIS feature ID: 2631576

Southport is a census-designated place (CDP) in the town of Fairfield, Connecticut, United States. It is located along Long Island Sound between Mill River and Sasco Brook, where it borders Westport. As of the 2020 census, it had a population of 1,710. Settled in 1639, Southport center has been designated a local historic district since 1967. In 1971, it was listed on the National Register of Historic Places as the Southport Historic District.

== History ==
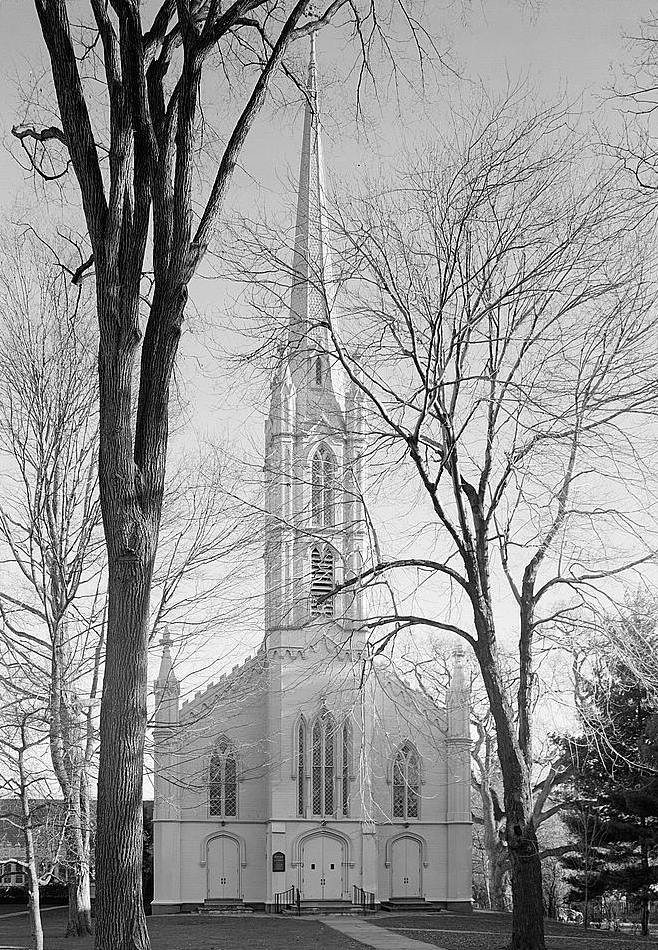
Trinity Church in Southport, photographed in 1966

The indigenous village of Sasqua, inhabited by Quiripi language speakers, was located in the area. Members of that community later formed the Golden Hill Paugussett Indian Nation.

The earliest recorded event in Southport's history was "The Great Swamp Fight" or "Fairfield Swamp Fight" of July 1637 (not to be confused with the later Great Swamp Fight of King Philip's War), an episode of the Pequot War in which English colonial forces led by John Mason and Roger Ludlow vanquished a band of 80 to 100 Pequot Indians who had earlier fled from their home territory in the Mystic area and taken refuge with approximately 200 Sasqua Indians who inhabited the area that is now Fairfield. The exact location of the battle is unclear, but it is known to have been in the vicinity of Southport. In 1639, Ludlow established the town of Fairfield on the Pequot land known as Unquowa. Colonial deeds of land were signed with the Sasqua in the 1670s.

In the eighteenth century, Mill River village, a part of Fairfield, was a small hamlet of a few houses and a wharf at the mouth of Fairfield's Mill River. Farm products from the surrounding area were shipped from Mill River's small harbor to ports in New York and beyond.

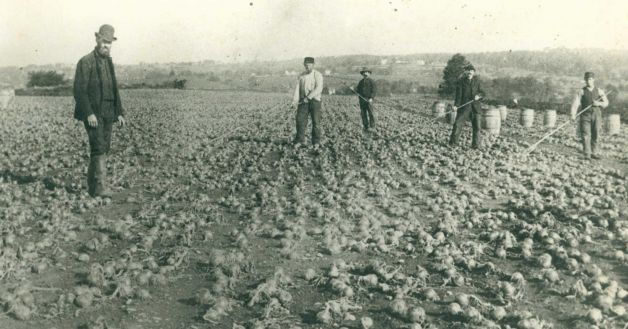
Onion harvest in ca. 1880

By 1831 the village had changed its name to Southport and was a bustling commercial area with warehouses, churches, schools, stores and elegant houses. Before 1853, Southport had its own local government as a borough within the town of Fairfield.

=== Economic history ===
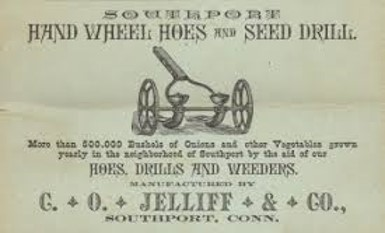
Hand Wheel Hoe and Seed Drill

Southport became a leading coastal port on Long Island Sound, its ships carrying produce and goods back and forth to New York City. A measure of Southport's success is the fact that throughout the 1800s it possessed the only two banks in town. However, competition from steamboats and the railroad took their toll on prosperity. Resourceful shippers teamed with local farmers and businessmen to keep the port going.

The Southport Onion, a high quality onion, was developed and grown on Westport's and Fairfield's hills and shipped in Southport market boats. These boats were mostly sloops that carried 50 tons and more in some cases of cargo keeping the harbor profitable until the end of the century. The federal government supported repairs to the harbor in the 1840s. During the 1840s, the greatest agricultural innovation in Fairfield became the cultivation of onions. From 1840 to 1890, 200,000 tons yearly were shipped out of Southport. Designed to be easily stored, during the Civil War sales spiked, its high vitamin C content prized by the U.S. Navy to prevent scurvy. The U.S. Army prized it to treat gunshot wounds, at one point to the extent that General Ulysses S. Grant refused to move his troops if they were not supplied with onions.

In the 1890s, 100,000 barrels of locally grown onions, carrots, potatoes, and other goods were shipped annually from Southport harbor.

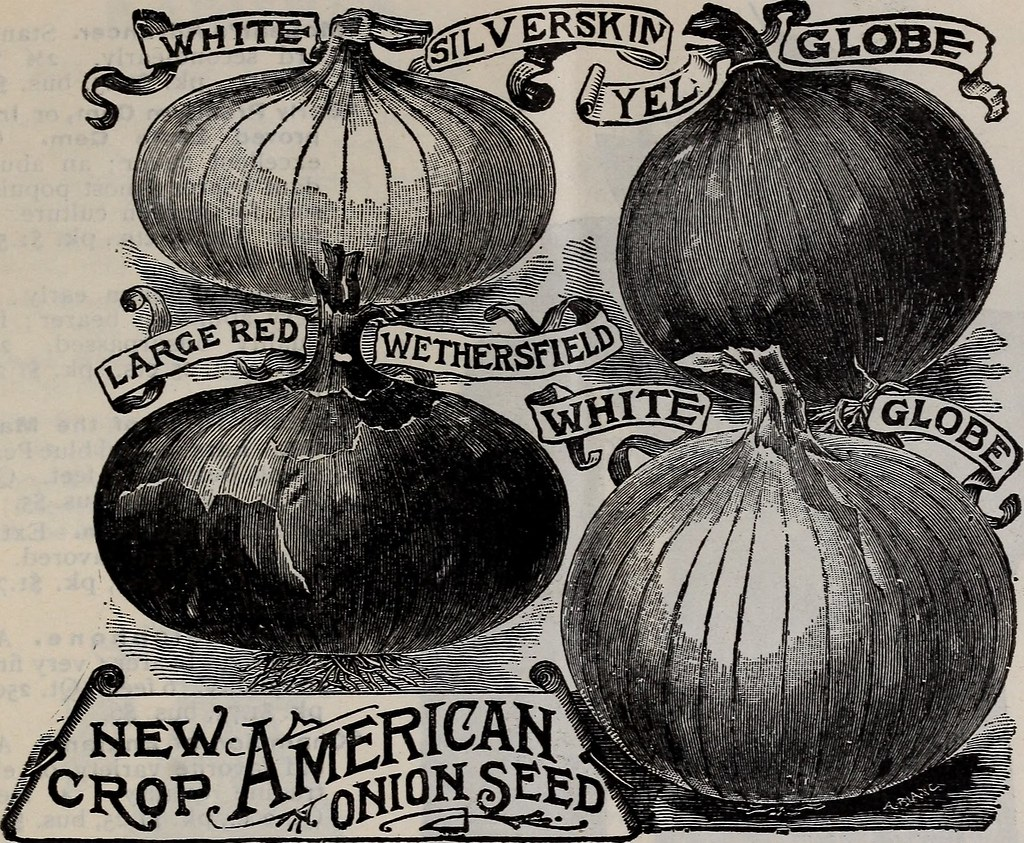
Image from page 12 of "Catalogue of seeds & plants, spring 1901-1902" (1902)

The shipping industry was the economic foundation of the village of Mill River. The village, as it became a large port, eventually changed its name to South Port, later Southport. Local farmers transported their Southport Globe onions and other crops via the growing shipping fleet housed in the harbor and, by 1836, it became larger than the New York City and Boston ports. The ships sailed to destinations as far as the West Indies, but often went to New York City, where larger vessels in a deeper port headed to more distant foreign destinations. During the period from 1750 to 1900, the shipping industry grew dramatically, but died out as the railroad industry and steamship industries took over. The increased use of large shipping containers also decreased transport costs and eventually drove the need to use ports deeper than Southport Harbor. The local produce was transported to New York and Boston via train, to deeper water ports where larger vessels were docked.

=== Local Sea Captains ===
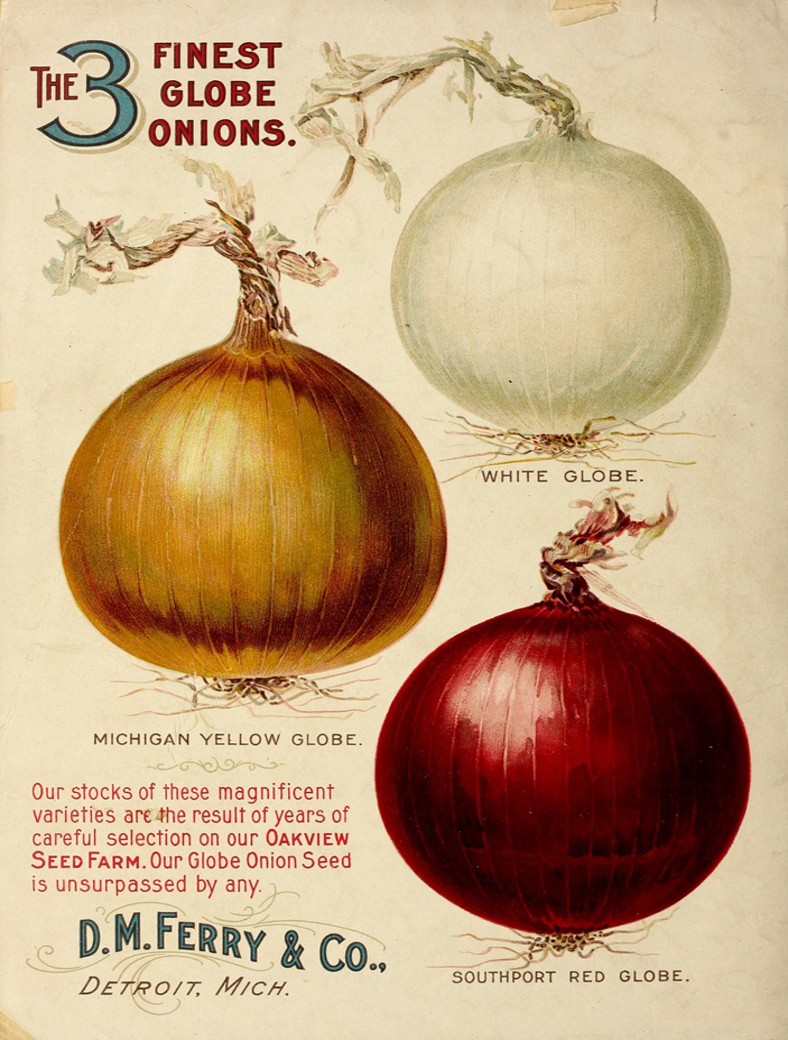
D. M. Ferry Seed Catalogue, Detroit, MI, ca. 1900

During the peak of the shipping era, Southport had four shipyards in old Mill River, and many of Southport's first families built their wealth in the lucrative shipping trade that grew in response to local farmers wanting a more convenient port than Bridgeport and Norwalk Harbors. Numerous area parks and streets are named after prominent sea captains, including Bulkley Avenue, Sherwood Island State Park, and Sturges Highway. Capt. Zalman Wakeman owned Wakeman Farms, which is still operating today.

=== Preservation ===
Today, much of the old village area is part of a town historic district, first established in 1967, where buildings from three centuries are protected for future generations. The boundaries of the town historic district are the railroad on the north; the Mill River and Southport Harbor on the south; Church Street; and Old South Road and Rose Hill Road on the west and east, respectively, including all properties on both sides of the roads. Strict historic zoning regulations apply in the district and have been upheld by the Connecticut Supreme Court. The Southport Historic District is also listed on the National Register of Historic Places.

== Architecture ==
Southport is home of historic residences and institutional buildings in New England. Southport Village was selected as a Connecticut Historical District in 1966, and a National Historic District in 1971. As a result, the Village perfectly preserves a wide variety of very different architectural styles. Ranging from the 1760s to the 1890s, architectural styles reflected include: Greek Revival, Federal, Queen Anne, Italianate, Stick Style, and more.

Many of these buildings were constructed by local firm Jelliff and Northrop, with several designed by noted architectural firm Bunnell & Lambert.

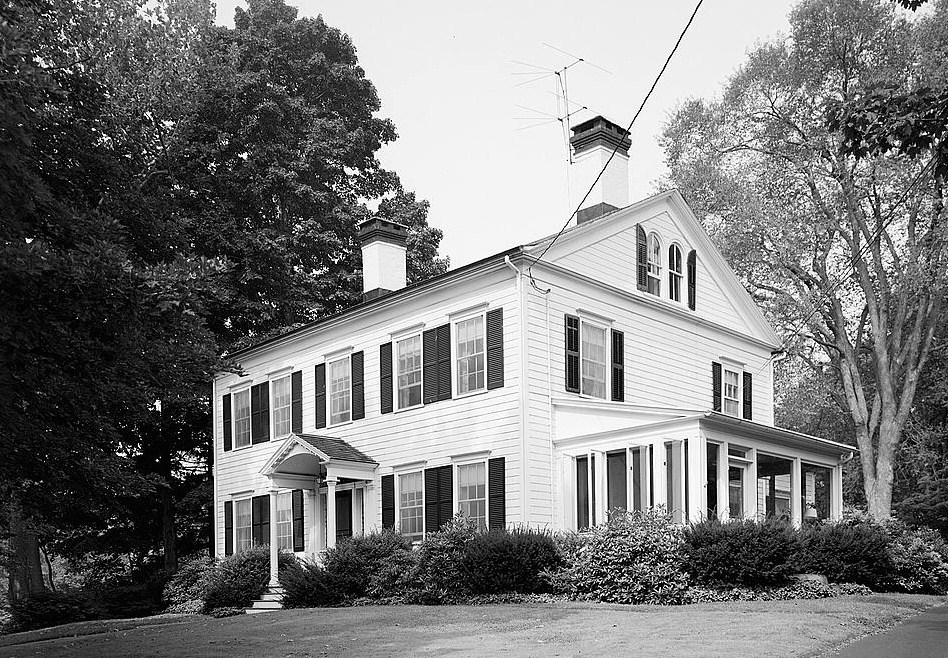
Gurdon Perry House, Federal style (1830)

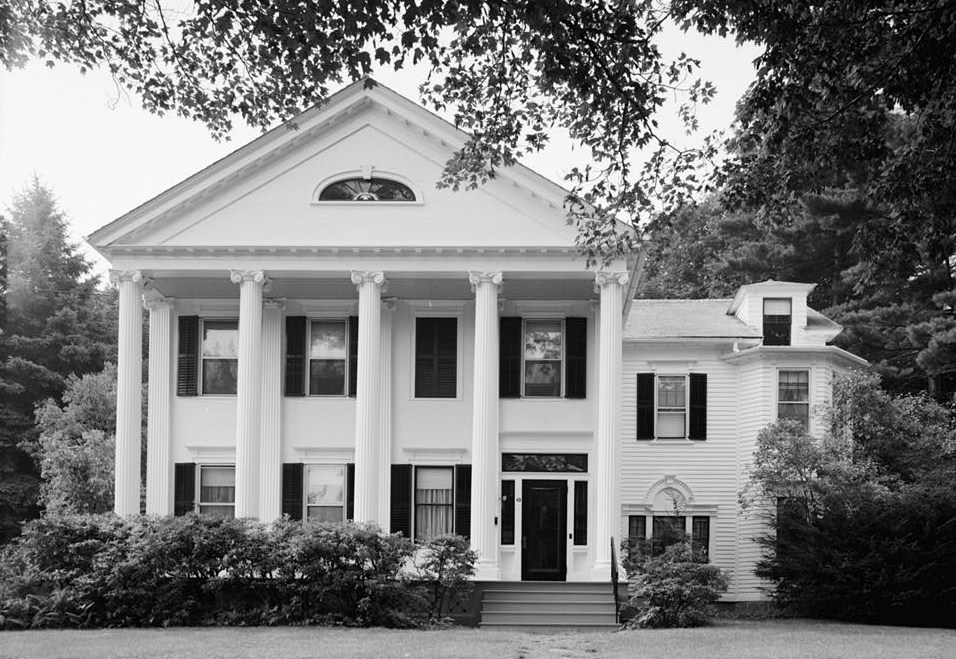
Henry Perry House, Greek Revival (1832)

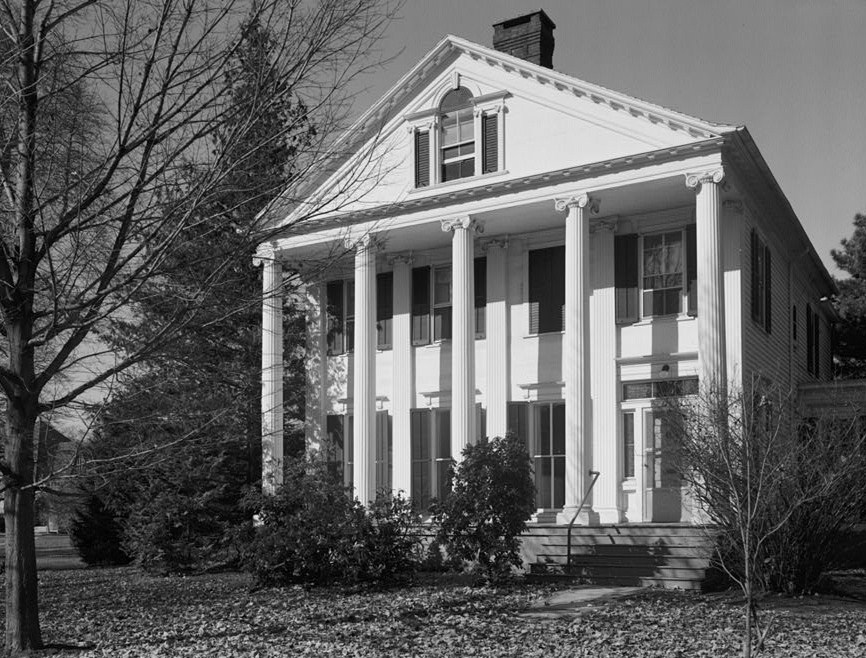
Francis Perry House, Greek Revival (1832)

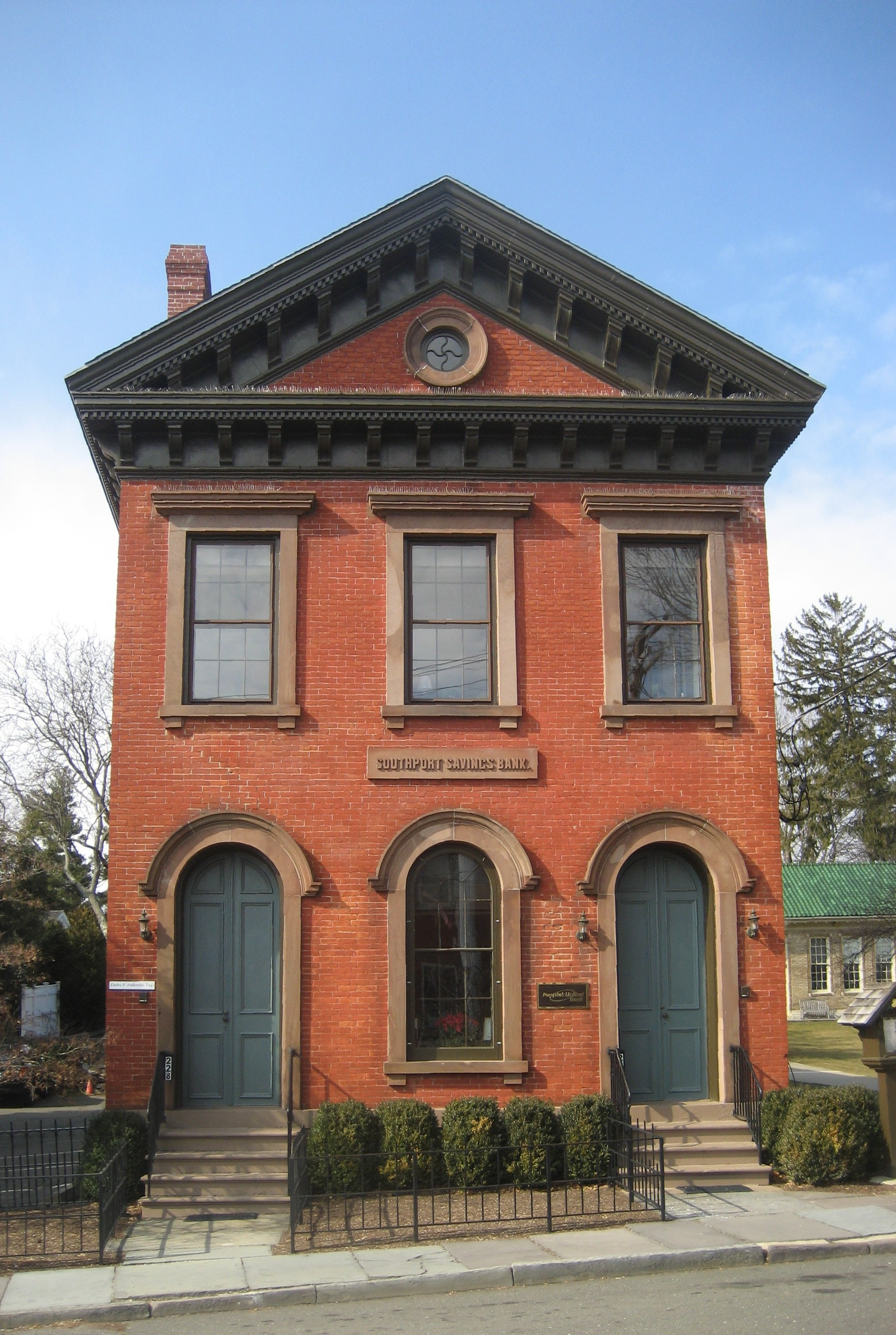
Southport Savings Bank, Italianate (1863)

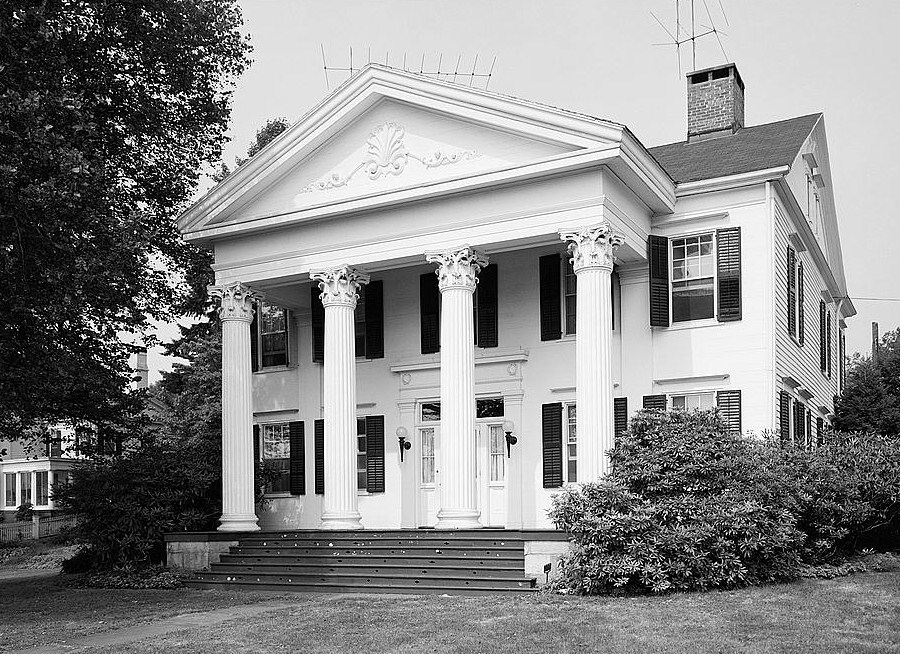
Austin Perry House, Greek Revival (1835)

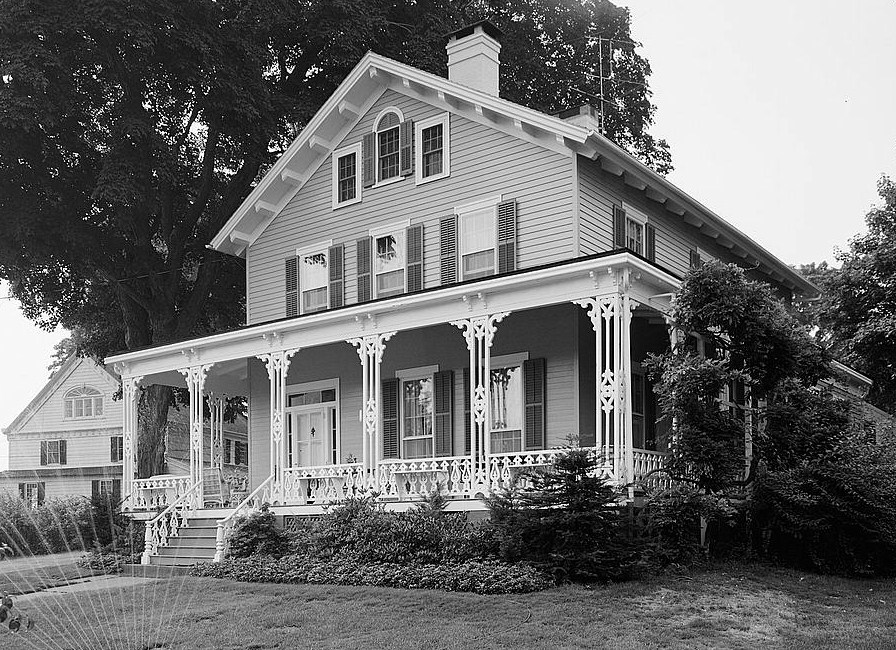
Captain Wakeman B. Meeker House (1857)

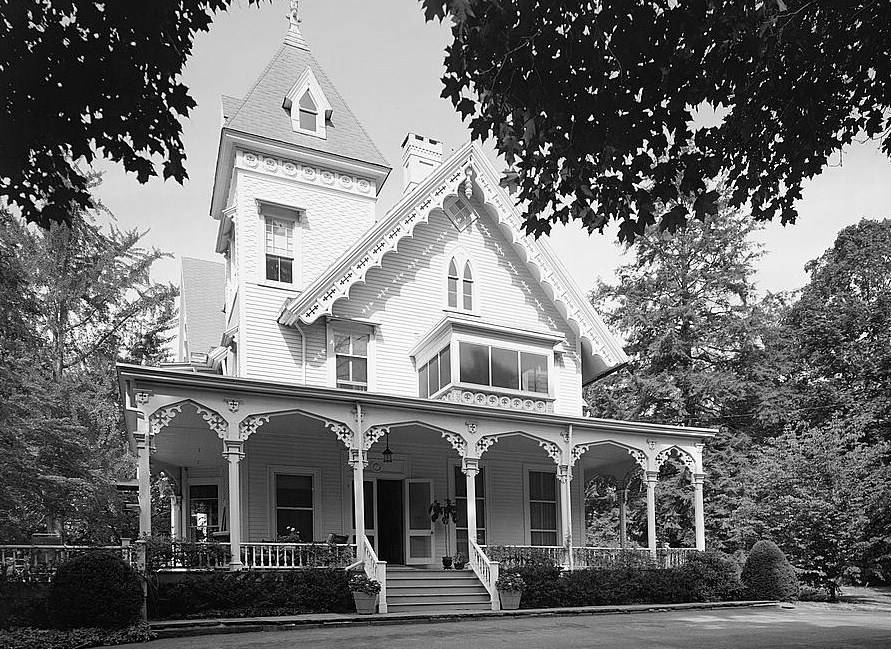
Oliver Bulkley House (1861), Lambert & Bunnell, Gothic Revival

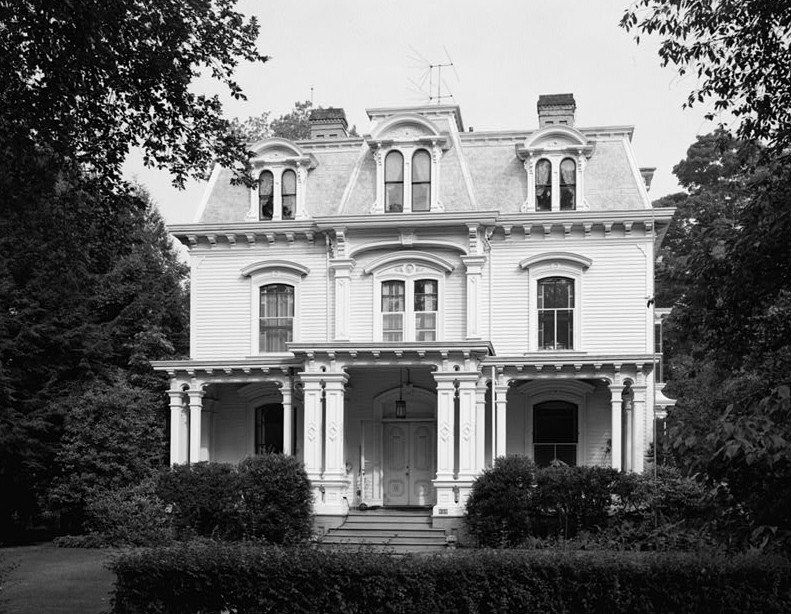
Mrs. Benjamin Pomeroy House (1868), Lambert & Bunnell, Second Empire Style

== Geography ==
According to the United States Census Bureau, Southport has a total area of 1.338 square miles (3.47 km^{2}), of which 1.191 square miles (3.08 km^{2}) is land and 0.147 square miles (0.38 km^{2}), or 10.99%, is water.

== Demographics ==
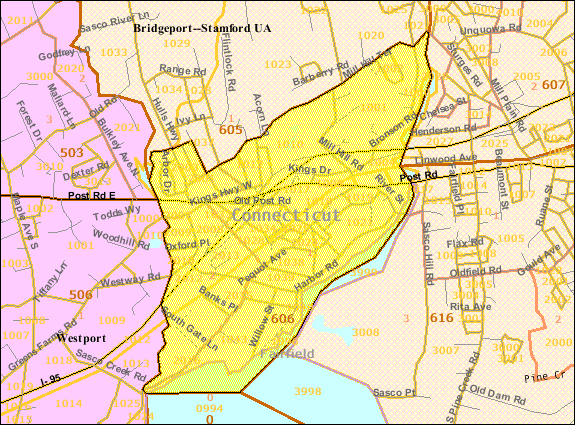
Census Tract 606

The village of Southport corresponds to census tract 606.

=== 2020 census ===
As of the 2020 census, Southport had a population of 1,797. The median age was 51.1 years. 19.0% of residents were under the age of 18 and 27.4% of residents were 65 years of age or older. For every 100 females there were 85.3 males, and for every 100 females age 18 and over there were 81.8 males age 18 and over.

100.0% of residents lived in urban areas, while 0.0% lived in rural areas.

There were 791 households in Southport, of which 24.0% had children under the age of 18 living in them. Of all households, 52.7% were married-couple households, 15.0% were households with a male householder and no spouse or partner present, and 29.5% were households with a female householder and no spouse or partner present. About 33.7% of all households were made up of individuals and 20.1% had someone living alone who was 65 years of age or older.

There were 898 housing units, of which 11.9% were vacant. The homeowner vacancy rate was 3.0% and the rental vacancy rate was 12.3%.

Racial composition as of the 2020 census
Race	Number	Percent
White	1,537	85.5%
Black or African American	16	0.9%
American Indian and Alaska Native	0	0.0%
Asian	95	5.3%
Native Hawaiian and Other Pacific Islander	0	0.0%
Some other race	21	1.2%
Two or more races	128	7.1%
Hispanic or Latino (of any race)	120	6.7%

=== Income and poverty ===
The median household income was $180,057, with 9% of households below the poverty line. The median value of homes in the village was $766,900

== Public services ==
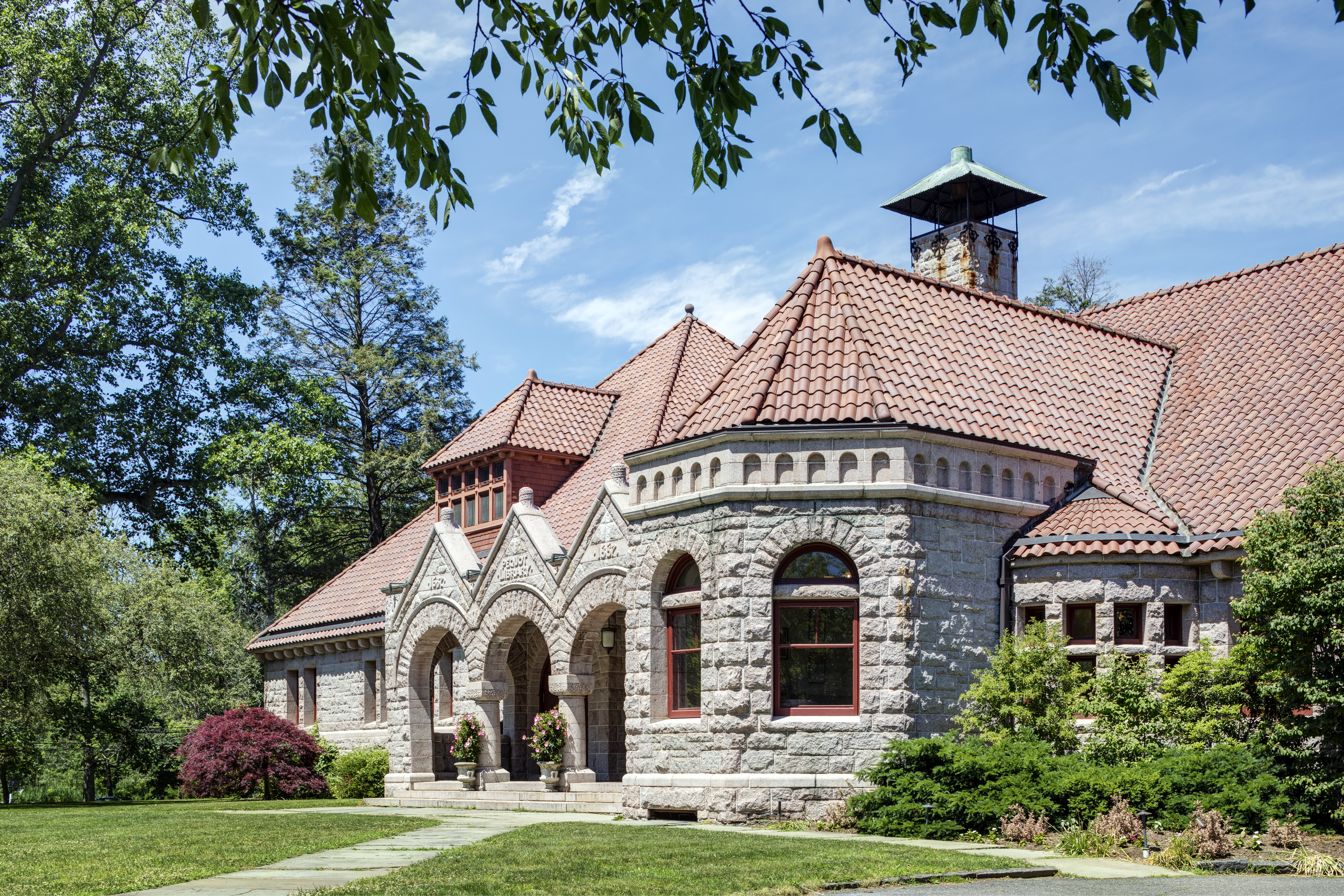
Pequot Library in Southport

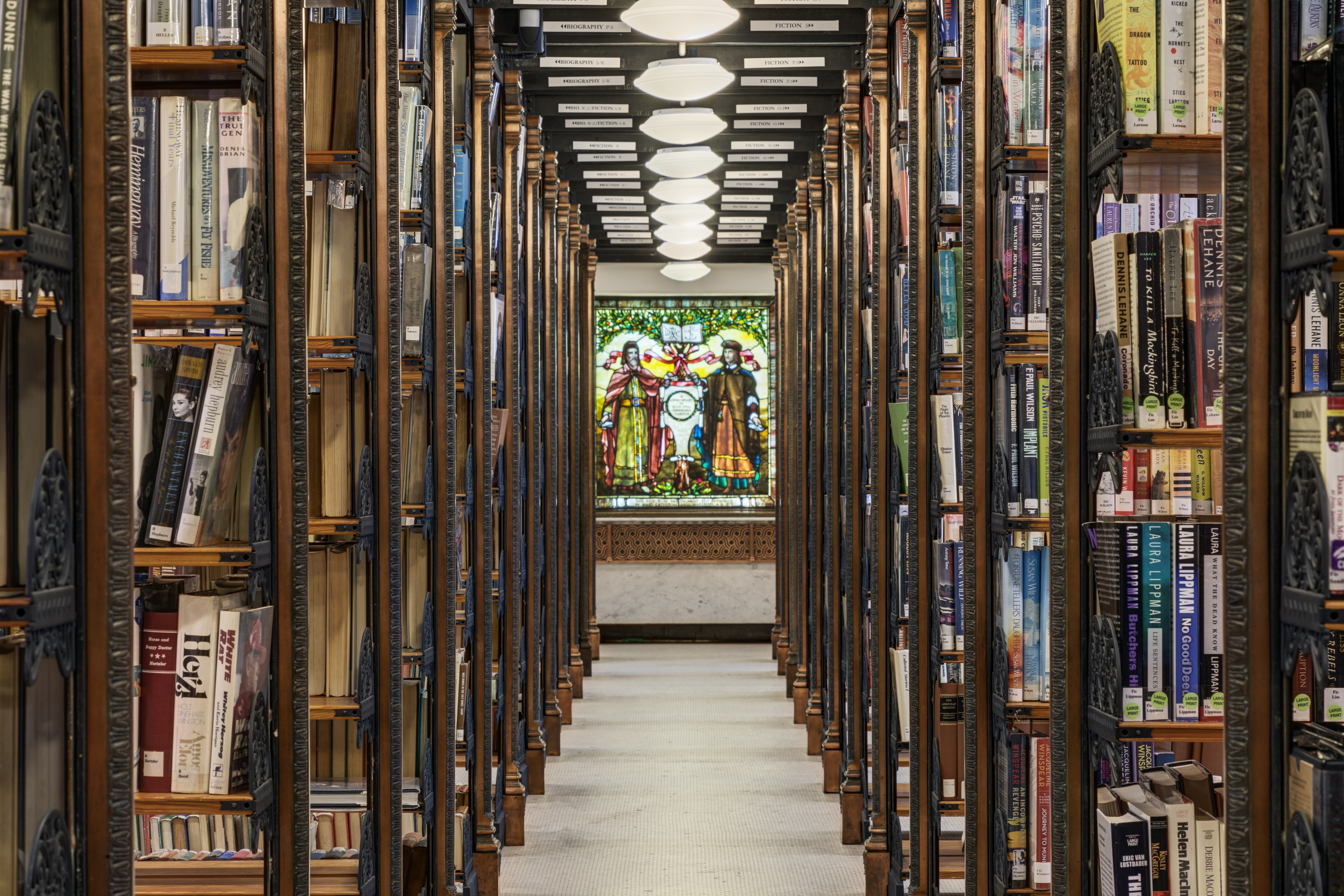
Pequot Library stacks and Tiffany window

Southport has had its own firefighting service since 1895. The Southport Fire Department was organized that year as a volunteer fire department after a large arson fire in the village. However, it is also protected by Fairfield Fire Department's Engine 4, out of the Southport Firehouse.

The neighborhood's ZIP Code is 06890, whose scope extends further north from the historic village area to include the Mill Hill area.

=== Library ===
The community's public library is the Pequot Library, an independently owned and operated special collections library, founded by Virginia Marquand Monroe and Elbert Monroe in 1887. A Richardsonian Romanesque building, it was designed by the architect Robert Henderson Robertson and is a contributing property to the National Register Southport Historic District.

The library has a large collection of manuscripts, rare books, and archives. Of the approximate 30,000 items in the Special Collections,1800 items are held on long-term loan at the Beinecke Rare Book and Manuscript Library at Yale University.

The collection at Pequot Library includes the first printed cookbook, De Honesta Voluptate et Valetudine,by Bartholomaeus Platina (1475); autographs of all American Presidents and the cosigners of the Declaration of Independence, including the rare Button Gwinnett autograph. Among the titles in the Special Collections are Epistola de insulis nuper inventis by Christopher Columbus, translated into Latin by Leandro di Cosco and printed in 1493; two of the three contemporaneous histories of the Pequot War in New England; the Saybrook Platform which was the first book published in Connecticut in 1710. Also included in the collection is Phillis Wheatley's Poems on various subjects, religious and moral from 1786 as well as the typescript of the last four chapters of Margaret Mitchell's Gone With the Wind.

The library's annual summer book sale featured more than 140,000 volumes on sale in 2007. In 2006, the Pequot Library invested in a restoration project to address the condition of the elaborate metalwork set throughout their stacks. Robert Robertson designed each shelf in the library to be supported by cast iron structures. Each row of shelving is framed by columns and the stairways linking the two stories are made with balusters of garlands and vines in copper plated cast iron. During the course of restoration, over 6,000 metal pieces were individually treated. The project was carried out by Newmans’ Ltd.

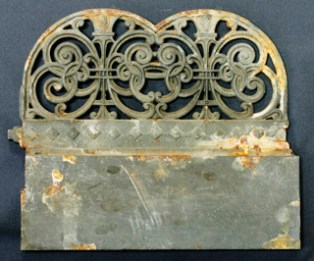
Pequot Library baseboard before restoration

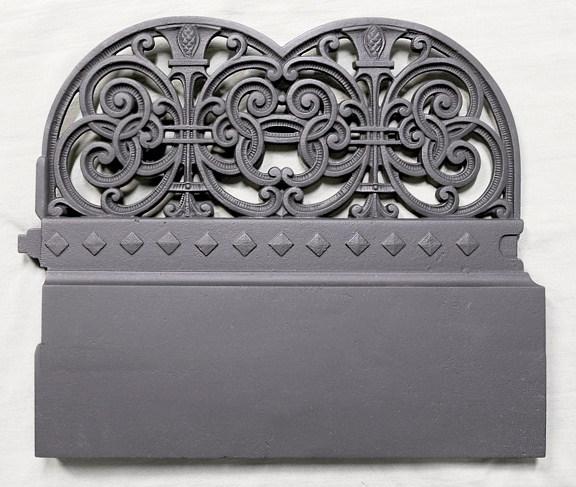
Pequot Library baseboard completed by Newmans' Ltd

== Education ==
Eagle Hill School-Southport, a private day school for children with learning disabilities, has been located since 1985 in the former Pequot School in Southport. The historic school building was earlier acquired by the Southport Conservancy to save it from demolition.

Southport is served by the Fairfield Public Schools. Southport is home to Mill Hill Elementary School, although children in some areas considered part of the Southport neighborhood but outside the census tract attend Timothy Dwight Elementary School. Both Mill Hill and Dwight Schools feed into Roger Ludlowe Middle School, Tomlinson Middle School and Fairfield Ludlowe High School.

== Transportation ==
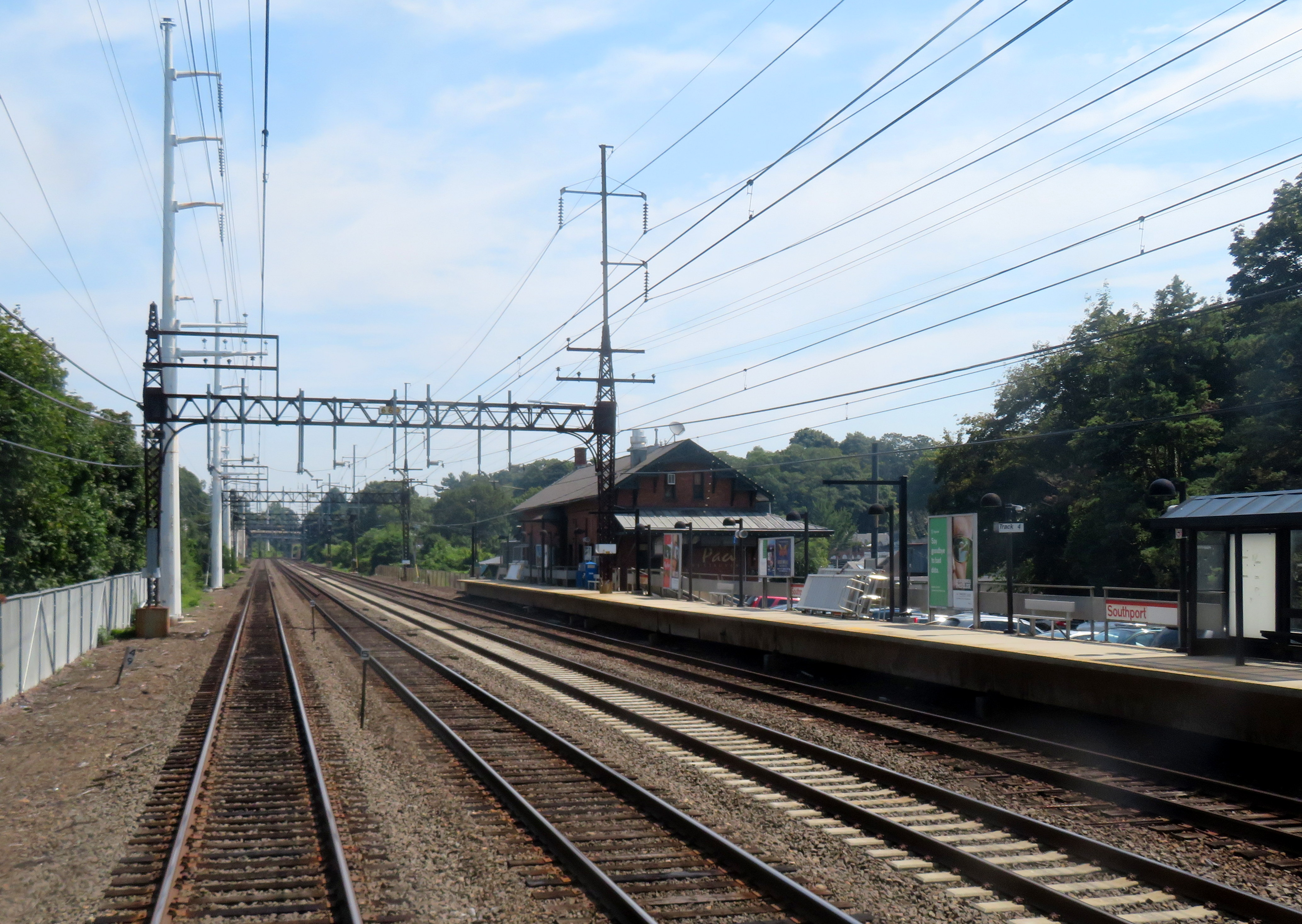
Southport station is part of Metro-North Railroad's New Haven Line

The main arterial road in the area, the Post Road (Route 1), runs through Southport, connecting it to other towns along the Connecticut coast. I-95 also passes through Southport, with two exits located in the neighborhood. Southport is also served by the New Haven Line of the Metro-North Commuter Railroad at Southport Railroad Station, with frequent trains to New Haven and New York City. Limited bus service is provided by the Greater Bridgeport Transit Authority.

== Notable people ==
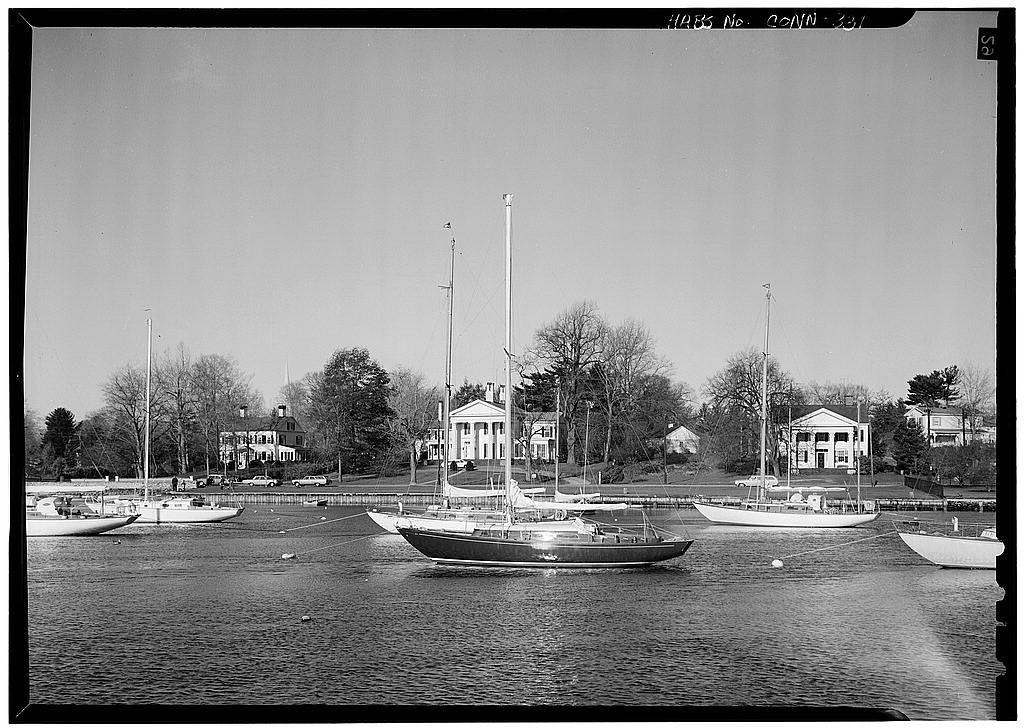
Sailboats in Southport Harbor, 1966

The following are among the notable people who have lived in Southport:

- James Truslow Adams, historian and writer
- John Akers, former chief executive officer of IBM
- Anatole Broyard, author
- Ina Garten, celebrity cook and author
- Jeffrey Garten, economic adviser and author
- Don Imus, radio personality
- Richard Clarida, Vice Chairman of the Federal Reserve, Economist
- Kenton Clarke, CEO, Computer Consulting Associates International Inc.
- Ruth Madoff, widow of Bernie Madoff
- Samuel J. Palmisano, former chief executive officer of IBM
- Jason Robards, actor, producer and director
- John Turitzin, lawyer and former business executive at Marvel Entertainment
- Stokely Webster, impressionist painter
- Jack Welch, former CEO General Electric
