= Eureka High School =

Eureka High School may refer to:

In the United States:

- Eureka High School (California), Eureka, California
- Eureka School, former school including a high school for African Americans in Georgia
- Eureka High School (Illinois), Eureka, Illinois
- Eureka High School (Kansas), Eureka, Kansas
- Eureka High School (Mississippi), former high school for African Americans in Hattiesburg, Mississippi
- Eureka High School (Missouri), Eureka, Missouri
- Eureka High School (Nevada), Eureka, Nevada
- Eureka High School (South Dakota), Eureka, South Dakota
