= Daniel Robert House =

- U.S. National Register of Historic Places
- New Jersey Register of Historic Places
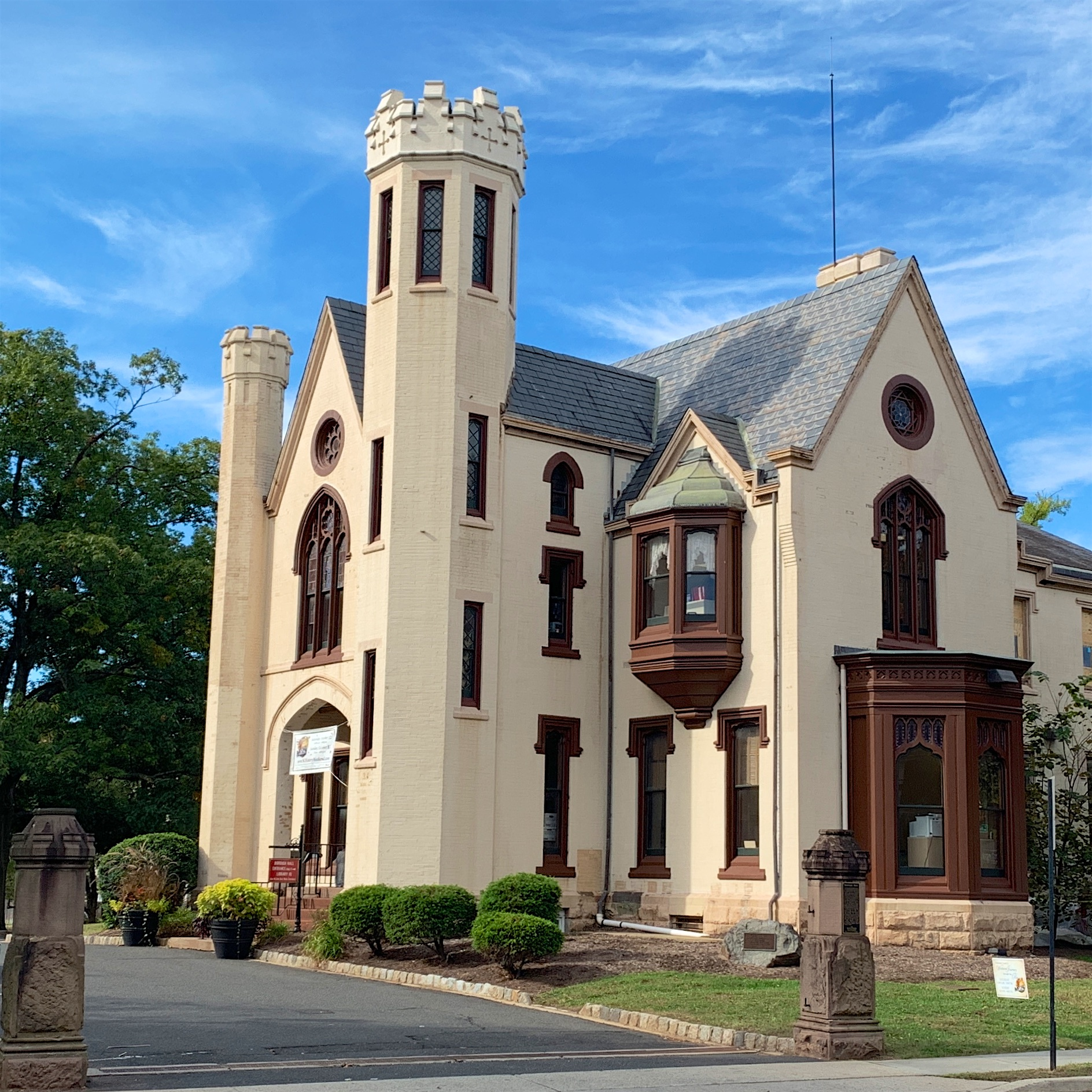
- Daniel Robert House in 2019

- Location within Somerset County, New Jersey Location within New Jersey Location within the United States
- Location: 25 West End Avenue; Somerville, New Jersey
- Coordinates: 40°34′14″N 74°37′11″W
- Area: 3 acres (1.2 ha)
- Built: 1888
- Architect: Lambert & Bunnell
- Architectural style: Gothic Revival
- NRHP reference No.: 08000137
- NJRHP No.: 4400

Significant dates
- Added to NRHP: March 5, 2008
- Designated NJRHP: December 20, 2007

The Daniel Robert House is a historic house located at 25 West End Avenue in the borough of Somerville in Somerset County, New Jersey. The house was built in 1888 for Daniel Robert (1840–1908) by the architectural firm Lambert & Bunnell based on Gothic Revival style houses designed by the architect Alexander Jackson Davis. It now serves as the Somerville Borough Hall and the Somerville Public Library. The building was added to the National Register of Historic Places on March 5, 2008 for its significance in architecture from 1888 to 1939.

== History ==
The Daniel Robert House is the third building at this location. The first was a tavern built early in the 19th century and the second was built by Albert Cammann in 1848. Daniel Robert, a wealthy businessman from New York, bought the property in 1886. He tore down the Cammann house in 1887 and built the current mansion. He lived here until his death in 1908. His widow sold it to the Somerville Lodge of the Elks in 1923. The borough bought it in 1958 for use as the Borough Hall.

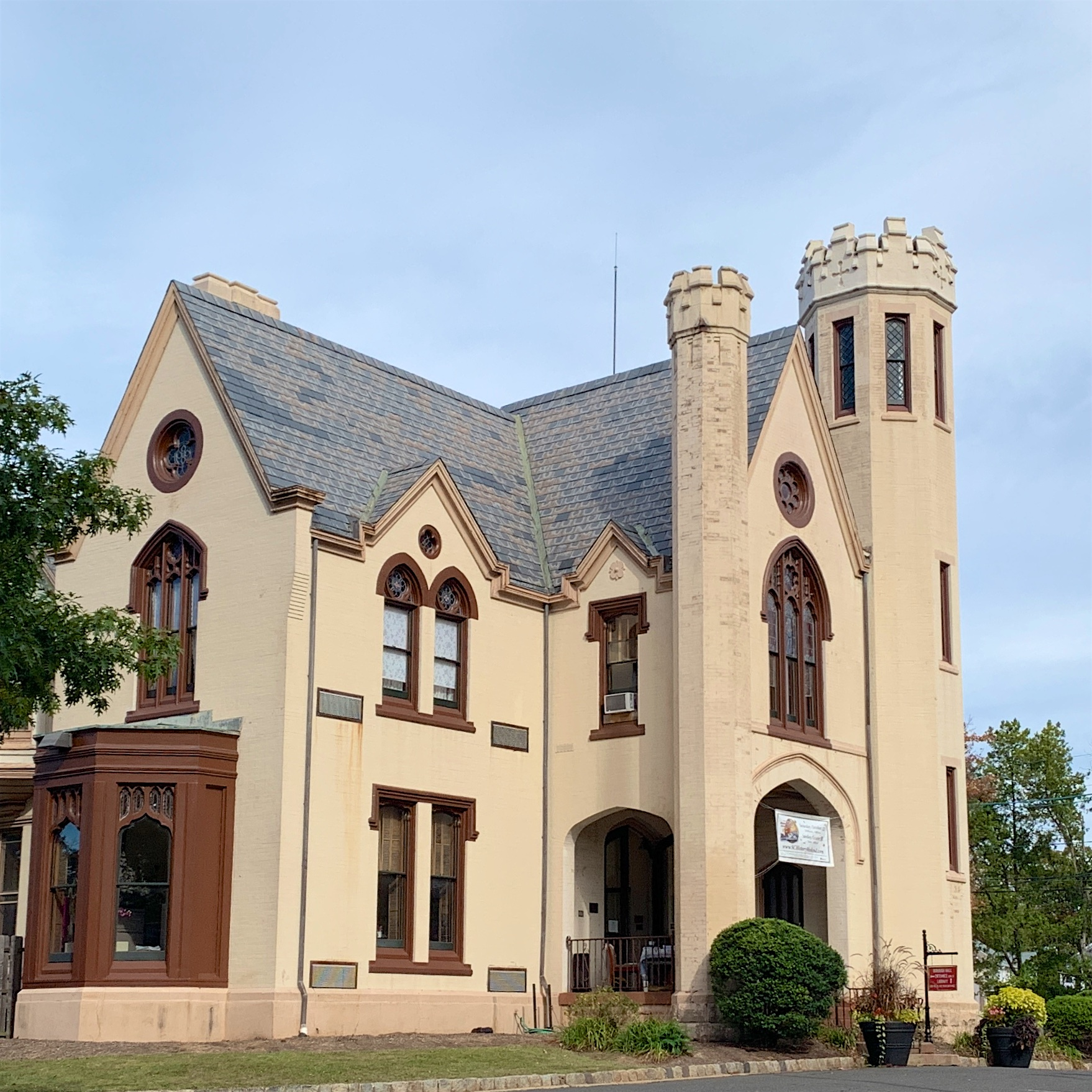
Daniel Robert House looking north

== See also ==
- National Register of Historic Places listings in Somerset County, New Jersey
