= Electronic hook switch =

An electronic hook switch (EHS) is a device which electronically connects a wireless headset and phone. An EHS passes predefined signalling. Either bluetooth headset or DECT headset can be used.

Users can handle calls with the headset only, freeing them from remaining next to the phone. Switching from handset to headset is typically accomplished by pushing a specific button.

== Features ==
- Answer call: enables the user to answer a call from the headset.
- End call: enables the user to hang up a call from the headset.
- Ringtone in headset: headset plays a ringtone when the phone receives a call.
- Volume control: enables the user to control volume from headset.
- Mute control: enables the user to toggle mute between on and off.
