= East High School =

East High School may refer to:

== United States ==
- East High School (Arizona), Phoenix, Arizona
- East High School (Denver, Colorado)
- East High School (Pueblo, Colorado)
- East High School (Sioux City, Iowa)
- East High School (Des Moines, Iowa)
- East High School (Minnesota), Duluth, Minnesota
- East High School (Missouri), Kansas City, Missouri
- East High School (Buffalo, New York)
- East High School (Rochester, New York)
- East High School (Cleveland, Ohio)
- East High School (Columbus, Ohio)
- East High School (Youngstown, Ohio)
- East High School (Tennessee), Memphis, Tennessee
- East High School (Utah), Salt Lake City, Utah

== Schools with variant names in the United States ==
- East Anchorage High School, Anchorage, Alaska
- East Bakersfield High School, Bakersfield, California
- Redlands East Valley High School, California
- Rockford East High School, Rockford, Illinois
- Columbus East High School, Columbus, Indiana
- Olathe East High School, Kansas
- Wichita High School East, Kansas
- East Grand Rapids High School, East Grand Rapids, Michigan
- Lincoln East High School, Nebraska
- East Chapel Hill High School, Chapel Hill, North Carolina
- East Gaston High School, Mount Holly, North Carolina
- Sciotoville Community School (East High School), Portsmouth, Ohio
- Central Bucks East High School, Buckingham, Pennsylvania
- West Chester East High School, West Chester, Pennsylvania
- Cranston High School East, Cranston, Rhode Island
- Austin-East High School, Knoxville, Tennessee
- Green Bay East High School, Wisconsin
- Madison East High School, Wisconsin
- Sun Prairie East High School, Wisconsin
- Appleton East High School, Wisconsin
- Wauwatosa East High School, Wisconsin
- Cheyenne East High School, Cheyenne, Wyoming

== See also ==
- Eastern High School (disambiguation)
