= Erection Hardness Score =

Patient-reported outcome for scoring erection hardness

The Erection Hardness Score (EHS) is a single-item Likert scale used to assess the subjective hardness of the penis as reported by the patient. It ranges from 0 (indicating the penis does not enlarge) to 4 (indicating the penis is completely hard and fully rigid). Developed in 1998, the EHS is widely used in clinical trials and is recognized for its ease of administration and strong association with sexual function outcomes. It has been validated across various causes of erectile dysfunction and in patients treated with phosphodiesterase type 5 inhibitors (PDE5), showing robust psychometric properties and responsiveness to treatment.

== Overview ==
Erection hardness (EH) is a key indicator of erectile dysfunction (ED) and is usually assessed through tactile methods. The Erection Hardness Score (EHS) is a simple, validated, self-reported tool that measures erection hardness on a 4-point scale: 0 (no enlargement), 1 (enlarged but not hard), 2 (hard but not for penetration), 3 (hard enough for penetration but not fully rigid), and 4 (fully rigid). While the EHS is based on the patient's subjective assessment and provides a graded measure of erection hardness, a more quantitative approach could offer greater objectivity and accuracy. As of 2020, EHS is the primary method used in clinical practice to evaluate erection hardness.

== Psychometric properties ==
The Erection Hardness Score (EHS) was developed to simplify the evaluation of erectile function (EF) while maintaining reliability and validity. It is a single-item scale that measures erection hardness from 0 (not enlarged) to 4 (fully rigid).

The EHS is a robust and easy-to-use one-item patient-reported outcome that is highly responsive to treatment. It has demonstrated strong discriminative ability to identify ED, strong test-retest reliability, acceptable response quality and distribution, and known-groups validity by effectively distinguishing between normal and impaired erectile function compared to the International Index of Erectile Function (IIEF). It has also showed moderate-to-strong convergent validity with the IIEF and Quality of Erection Questionnaire (QEQ) domains. Psychometric analysis supports its use as a simple, reliable, and valid tool for assessing erection hardness in clinical research.

A 2023 study published in Urology evaluated the Erection Hardness Score during masturbation for diagnosing predominantly organic erectile dysfunction (ED) compared to the nocturnal penile tumescence and rigidity (NPTR) test. Among 189 patients, the EHS demonstrated a sensitivity of 60.0% and specificity of 95.7%, with an ROC curve area of 0.78, indicating its effectiveness in distinguishing between predominantly organic and nonorganic ED. An EHS score of 3-4, indicating good to optimal erectile function, suggests a lower likelihood of predominantly organic ED and may reduce the need for further NPTR testing.

A 2008 study published in The Journal of Sexual Medicine evaluated the relationship of EHS with successful sexual intercourse (SSI) using data from a multinational trial of sildenafil citrate involving 307 men with erectile dysfunction. Results showed that higher EHS scores significantly increased the odds of SSI, with the odds being 41.9 times greater for EHS 3 compared to EHS 2, and 23.7 times greater for EHS 4 compared to EHS 3. The percentage of SSI rose from 60% at EHS 3 to 93.1% at EHS 4. Sildenafil's effect on SSI was largely mediated through its impact on erection hardness. These findings support the EHS as a valid, reliable, and clinically useful measure for evaluating erection hardness.

== Criticisms and limitations ==
While the EHS is straightforward and convenient, it remains subjective and semi-quantitative. As of 2020, no objective, quantitative method for evaluating penile erection hardness exists.

The EHS, validated primarily in sildenafil research, lacks broader validation studies, raising concerns about its general applicability. The scale exhibits limitations in predictive validity and responsiveness compared to the IIEF. While it performs well in detecting ED, its ability to predict future outcomes and detect subtle changes over time is less robust. This may be due to the limitations inherent in single-item scales and the specific context of the studies conducted, which often involve different treatment settings and populations. The EHS is simple to use, which is beneficial, but its ability to detect subtle changes in erectile function and its effectiveness in various clinical settings warrant further study.

A study published in the Journal of Sexual Medicine in 2014, evaluated the Erection Hardness Score (EHS) in a cohort of 75 men with post-radical prostatectomy erectile dysfunction who were treated with alprostadil injections. It found that while the EHS demonstrated good psychometric properties, its predictive validity and responsiveness to changes over time were limited, which should be considered when using it for clinical follow-up.
