= Elkins High School =

Elkins High School may refer to:

- Elkins High School (Arkansas), Elkins, Arkansas
- Elkins High School (Missouri City, Texas)
- Elkins High School (West Virginia), Elkins, West Virginia
