= Fairfield County Jail =

- U.S. National Register of Historic Places
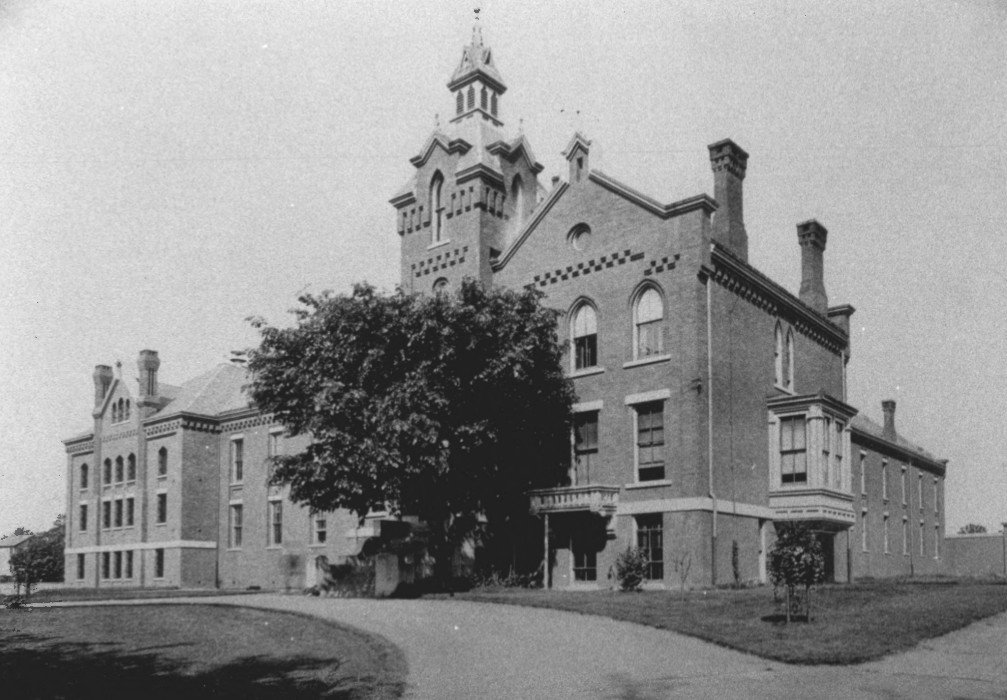
- c. 1890 photo of the jail

- Location within Connecticut Location within the United States
- Location: 1106 North Avenue, Bridgeport, Connecticut
- Area: 8 acres (3.2 ha)
- Built: 1870
- Architect: Lambert & Bunnell
- Architectural style: Gothic
- NRHP reference No.: 85000841
- Added to NRHP: April 18, 1985

The Fairfield County Jail was a historic penal facility at 1106 North Avenue in Bridgeport, Connecticut. Built in 1870-71, it served as a jail and prison for over a century, and was the state's oldest such facility in active use at the time of its listing on the National Register of Historic Places in 1985. It has subsequently been demolished; the property is now home to the more modern facilities of the Bridgeport Correctional Center.

== Description and history ==
The Fairfield County Jail occupied an 8-acre (3.2 ha) parcel north of downtown Bridgeport, bounded by North Avenue, Madison Avenue, Beers Street, and Fairmount Street. The main building was a sprawling 2-1/2 story masonry building, with an imposing Gothic Victorian facade. A multistage three-story tower rose from near the center of the main facade, providing a focal point and highlighting the main entrance at its base. The building was regularly expanded and altered over the many years it saw use as a jail.

The jail was built in 1870-71 to serve as the county's primary jail and workhouse. It was designed by the Bridgeport architectural firm of Lambert & Bunnell. The original main building was designed to house eighty male inmates, twelve female inmates, and a debtors' cell. Facilities included quarters for the superintendent, a chapel, and an infirmary. The property was taken over by the state following the 1960 abolition of county governments. The state Department of Corrections then took over administration of the property, and added modern facilities. The 1870 jail was torn down in 1997.

== See also ==
- National Register of Historic Places listings in Bridgeport, Connecticut
