= Eastern High School =

Eastern High School may refer to:

== United States ==
- Eastern High School (Pekin, Indiana), Pekin, Indiana
- Eastern High School (Louisville, Kentucky), Middletown, Kentucky
- Eastern High School (Maryland), Baltimore, Maryland
- Eastern High School (Michigan), Lansing, Michigan
- Eastern High School (Beaver, Ohio), Beaver, Ohio
- Eastern High School (Reedsville, Ohio), Reedsville, Ohio
- Eastern High School (Winchester, Ohio), Winchester, Ohio
- Eastern High School (Washington, D.C.), Washington, D.C.

== Other places ==
- Eastern High School, Cardiff, Wales, United Kingdom

== See also ==
- Bristol Eastern High School, Bristol, Connecticut, U.S.
- Eastern Christian High School, North Haledon, New Jersey, U.S.
- Eastern Hills Senior High School, a high school in Perth, Western Australia, Australia
- Eastern Junior-Senior High School, Greentown, Indiana, U.S.
- Eastern Mennonite School, Harrisonburg, Virginia, U.S.
- Eastern Regional High School, Voorhees, New Jersey, U.S.
- Eastern Technical High School, Essex, Maryland, U.S.
- East High School (disambiguation)
