= Edison High School (Portland, Oregon) =

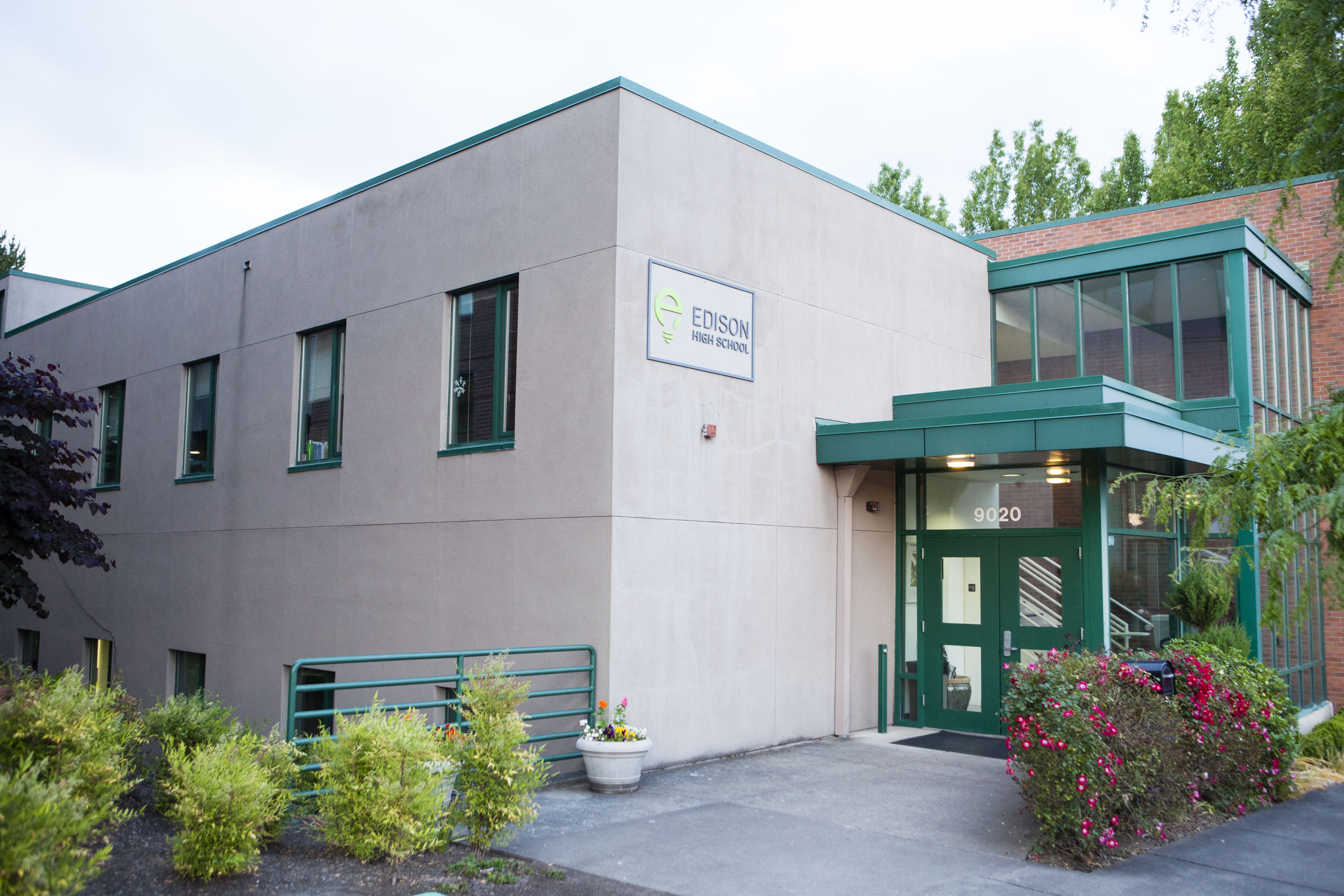

Location
- 9020 SW Beaverton-Hillsdale Highway; Portland, Oregon 97225; United States; 45.485284°N 122.769631°W

Information
- Type: Private
- Opened: 1973; 53 years ago
- Principal: Daniel Keller
- Grades: 9–12
- Enrollment: 150
- Accreditation: NWAC
- Affiliation: Independent
- Website: www.edisonhs.org

Edison High School is a private high school in Portland, Oregon, United States. Edison High School is open to students who have learning differences such as Dyslexia, Attention Deficit Disorder (ADD), & Attention Deficit Hyperactivity Disorder (ADHD). Edison is located on the campus of Jesuit High School and students go back and forth to take classes at both schools.

== History ==
Edison was founded in 1973 as the Tree of Learning. For many years, students were taught in portable classrooms on the Jesuit High School campus.

In 1992, Edison moved into a new building and changed the school's name to Thomas A. Edison High School in honor of the famed American inventor who had a learning difference. In 2014, they streamlined the school's name to Edison High School. Students also take classes in a satellite building in the Valley Plaza next door.

The former school Director, Patrick J. Maguire, joined the school in 1984 and became the director in 2000. Maguire retired in 2018. The philosophy of Edison High School is that learning proceeds from the creation of trusting relationships and a supportive community. At Edison, it all begins with their teaching staff of twenty-seven faculty members, which includes fourteen teachers; two Licensed Professional Counselors and a Licensed School Counselor, all with master’s degrees; one transition specialist; and administrative and development staff. There is relatively low faculty turnover. The Edison High School Board is composed of dedicated individuals from a variety of backgrounds who generously offer their knowledge, talents, and experience to serve the school and its students.

== Admission ==
Edison is the only private high school in Oregon specifically designed to meet the needs of students with complex learning differences. Because no two students are alike, Edison takes a customized approach to learning, offering individual attention when and where it is needed. Within the small and supportive academic environment, students develop strong relationships with faculty members who become familiar with their learning styles. Edison students gain self-discipline and organizational skills, practice self-advocacy and build confidence in their ability to learn, alongside their academic studies. In addition, they:

- Have a shorter school day than most mainstream high schools
- Begin classes later than most high schools, which has been proven to be beneficial for teenagers
- Maintain a very low student:teacher ratio of ten to one.

Edison is a four-year, full-service high school program with a strong record of academic success. The vast majority of their students receive their high school diplomas and most Edison students continue their education beyond a high school diploma. About one-third of the graduates go on to a four-year college, while two-thirds of students attend a two-year institution, enter the workforce or work while continuing post-graduate education. All students who earn their diplomas from Edison receive career awareness and guidance through the transition program.

Edison High School is a charitable corporation under section 501(c)(3) of the IRS code.

The school's official tagline is: "Your potential. Illuminated."
