= Eagle Hill School =

American private school

Location
- Hardwick, Massachusetts; 01037; United States; 42°21′46″N 72°12′1″W

Information
- Type: Independent private school Special education Boarding school
- Motto: Discere diverse, diverse docere
- Religious affiliation: Nonsectarian
- Established: 1967
- NCES School ID: 00603574; 01612613; A9302549
- Headmaster: Erin Wynne
- Teaching staff: 55.3 (on an FTE basis); 65.3 (on an FTE basis); 28.0 (on an FTE basis)
- Grades: 8-12
- Gender: Co-educational
- Enrollment: 209, 253, 108
- Student to teacher ratio: 3.8, 3.9
- Campus: Residential school
- Colors: White, Green
- Athletics: NEPSAC
- Mascot: Pioneer
- Nickname: EHS
- Affiliation: National Association of Independent Schools
- Website: Eagle Hill School (Hardwick)

Eagle Hill School is an independently operated, private boarding school serving students in grades 8-12 with attention deficit hyperactivity disorder, dyslexia, and other learning disabilities in Hardwick, Massachusetts, which was founded in 1967. Two other schools with the same name are located in Greenwich and Southport, Connecticut.

== History ==
In the early 1960s, Dr. James J.A. Cavanaugh, Director of the Department of Pediatrics at St. Elizabeth's Hospital in Brighton, Massachusetts, began working with children with dyslexia and other learning disabilities. Eagle Hill School in Hardwick is a college preparatory boarding school established to serve these students, addressing the limited educational options available at the time.

Joining Dr. Cavanaugh to launch the school were educational director Charles Drake of Brandeis University and headmaster Howard Delano, formerly of Fryeburg Academy. Nineteen children were in residence when the school opened its doors on family-owned property in September 1967. All of them were housed in the Main House, which now contains the school's administrative offices. By the third year, a dormitory was constructed and one hundred children were in residence. In 2009, the boarding enrollment for the school reached approximately 160 students.

On May 9, 2023, head of school Dr. PJ McDonald died. About a month later, Erin Wynne was appointed as the school's 4th head of school.

== Program ==
The school enrolls approximately 215 students in grades 8-12, with 119 faculty and staff members and a student-to-teacher ratio of approximately 4:1.

== Teacher Induction Training ==
Held every summer on the Eagle Hill campus the EHS Institute for Teacher Induction is an induction training program designed for first, second or third year public school teachers or seasoned teachers who are new to an urban district. Funded mainly by private organizations the institute was a line budget item in the 2008 Massachusetts state budget.

== Greenwich school ==
Eagle Hill School in Greenwich, Connecticut, enrolls approximately 260 students in grades K-10 who have language-based learning differences. The school consists of 75 teachers and a student-to-teacher ratio of approximately 4:1. While the Lower School serves elementary school students, the Upper School educates middle and junior high school students.

Founded in 1975, the school is accredited by the Connecticut State Department of Education and Connecticut Association of Independent Schools. They accept students from Fairfield and Westchester counties, as well as from Manhattan in its day program, and children from the tri-state areas of Connecticut, New York, and New Jersey in its five-day boarding program.

Notable alumni include the actress Julia Garner (born 1994).

== Southport School ==
The Southport School, previously known as Eagle Hill Southport School (EHSS), is a co-educational day school in Southport village, Connecticut, enrolling children aged 6 to 15. It was founded in 1984 by a group of educators from the Eagle Hill-Greenwich School, including the founding headmaster, Len Tavormina. EHSS is in the former Pequot School Building on the same site where Southport's elementary school and community center have stood since 1855. The brick building was erected in 1918, replacing an older wooden structure. Closed as a school in 1972, the building was later acquired by the Southport Conservancy as a landmark. The year 1985 saw its rebirth as a school when it was leased to EHSS under the direction of headmaster Len Tavormina. EHSS holds a 99-year lease on the building.

Tavormina retired in 2013, making way for EHSS' second headmaster, Ben Powers. Since his arrival, EHSS launched an updated middle school program for sixth, seventh, and eighth graders; focused on incorporating assistive technology into the program; integrated a speech and language pathologist into the program; and instituted an executive function coaching model. All of the staff is trained and accredited in the Orton-Gillingham approach.

In November 2017, the school changed its name to the Southport School.
