= Eureka School (Hattiesburg, Mississippi) =

Historic building in Hattiesburg, Mississippi, United States

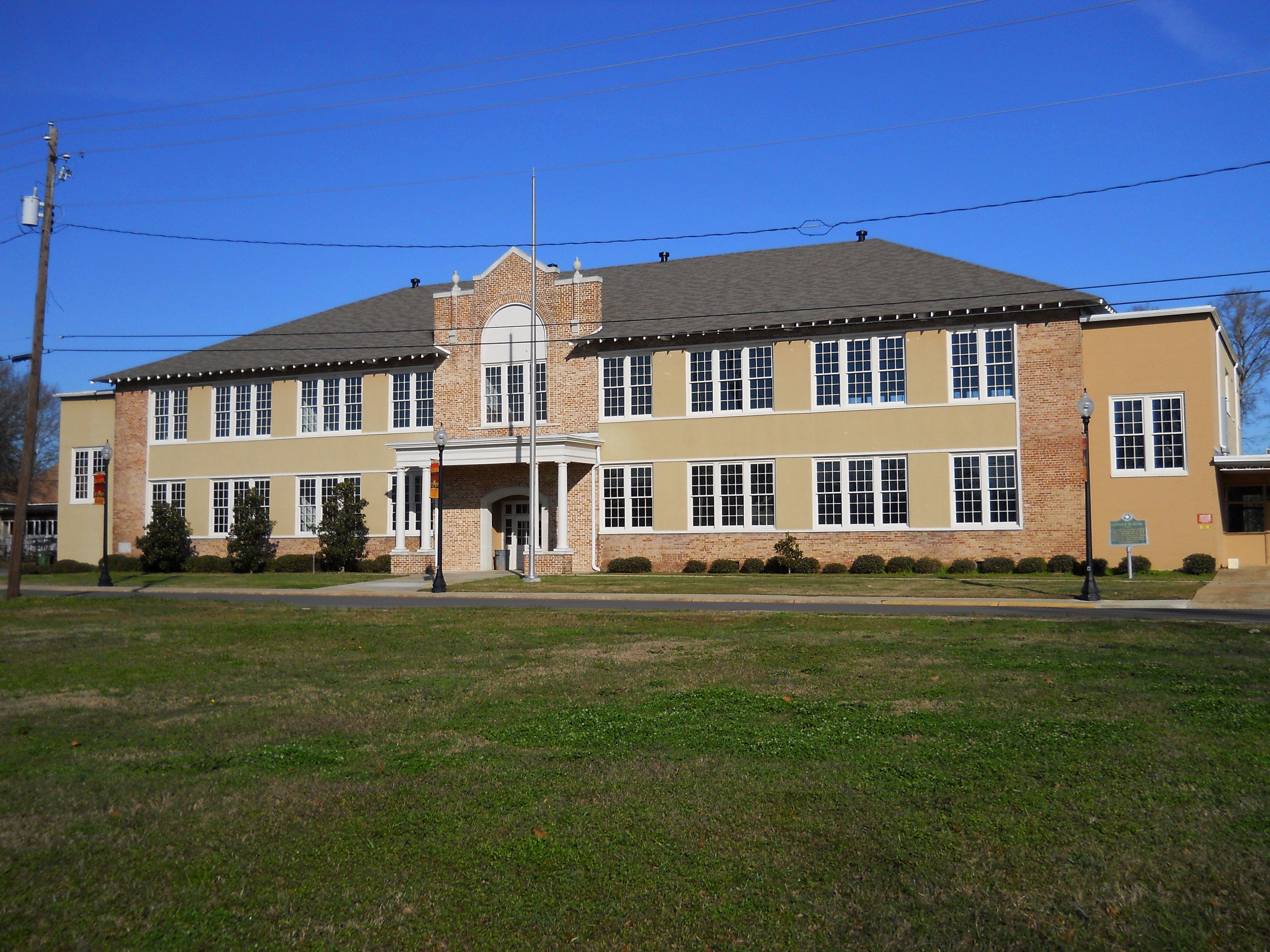
- Front facade in 2015

- Location within Mississippi
- 31.3347°N 89.2911°W
- Location: 412 East 6th Street; Hattiesburg, Mississippi

History
- Built: 1921

Site notes
- Governing body: Hattiesburg Convention Commission

Mississippi Landmark
- Designated: July 14, 2005
- Reference no.: 035-HAT-0309.2-ML

Eureka School, located at 412 East 6th Street in Hattiesburg, Mississippi, was constructed in 1921 as a public school for African Americans. The school was the first brick school building for black students to be built in Mississippi. The former school building, which now houses a civil rights museum, was designated a Mississippi Landmark in 2005.

== History ==
Construction of Eureka School was completed in September 1921, as a two-story brick building of about 27,000 ft^{2} (2,500 m^{2}). Funding was provided by a $75,000 bond issue.

Eureka School was the only public school for African Americans in Hattiesburg from 1921 to 1949, serving grades 1 through 12. Enrollment increased from 800 students in 1940 to 1,400 by 1947, requiring more school facilities. By 1949, a new high school for African Americans was built, but Eureka School continued to serve as an elementary school through desegregation, until 1987.

After the public school closed in 1987, the building was used as an adult literacy center and storage facility for the Hattiesburg Public School District.

== Restoration ==
In 2008, a groundbreaking ceremony was held to begin restoration of Eureka School for use as an African American Heritage and Cultural Museum. Funding for restoration was provided by grants through the Mississippi Department of Archives and History.

On February 10, 2013, an EF-4 tornado passed through Hattiesburg. During the storm, the roof of Eureka School was severely damaged. By the end of August 2013, roof repairs had been completed.

Restoration of the building's interior continued through 2014. Multi-phase renovations proceeded as funds became available. In January 2017, plumbing and electrical repairs and improvements were being scheduled, as well as interior painting, to complete the building's renovation.
