= Enterprise High School =

Enterprise High School may refer to:

- Enterprise High School (Alabama)
- Enterprise High School (Redding, California)
- Enterprise High School (Oregon)
- Enterprise High School (Utah)
- Enterprise High School, in the Enterprise School District (Mississippi)
