= EHS Institute =

- Hardwick, Massachusetts; USA

Information
- Type: Weeklong summer training for 1st, 2nd and 3rd year teachers
- Established: 2004
- Campus: Rural
- Website: Official Website

The EHS Institute for Teacher Induction is an induction training program primarily designed for first, second or third year public school teachers or seasoned teachers who are new to an urban district. The Institute is offered to public school districts and is held every summer on the Eagle Hill School campus in Hardwick, MA. Since the first cohort in 2005 over 500 teachers from Massachusetts districts have completed the EHS Institute. The training is funded by private organizations, Massachusetts school departments and was a line budget item in the 2008 Massachusetts state budget.

== History ==
In the summer of 2005 the first cohort of 28 teachers from the Worcester (MA) Public Schools attended the inaugural EHS Institute.

== Context ==
Recent research on teacher attrition suggests that as many as fifty percent of new teachers leave the profession within five years and that each year the gap between the number of teachers joining the profession and those leaving grows wider Among teachers leaving the profession, lack of adequate preparation and lack of support from colleagues and administration top the list of reasons for new teachers to seek other professions within their first few years, even surpassing teachers’ concerns about salary and professional prestige. The effectiveness of pre-service preparation and mentoring programs has been well documented in the literature

Studies of effective veteran teachers indicate that those teachers who remain in the profession tend to point to mentoring programs and capable school administrators who create supportive, challenging, and intellectually stimulating environments for teachers as the most important factors in their success The importance of developing cultural models for teaching professionals and for establishing meaningful support networks based on professional activities is well established in the literature and formed one of the central considerations for the development of the EHS Institute curriculum.

== Early Outcomes from Pilot Program Data ==
Of the 2005 pilot group of 28 teachers from the Worcester Public Schools, 25 remain in teaching (89%), 21 are currently employed in the Worcester Public Schools (75%). Following the methodology of the Birkeland & Curtis (2006) study of the Boston Public Schools where those teachers who were “non-renewed” at the district's discretion were factored out of attrition numbers (4 teachers in the 2005 WPS pilot group), the cumulative attrition for the WPS pilot group at the end of three years is 11%. Birkeland & Curtis (2006) report cumulative attrition for first-, second-, and third-year teachers of 47% in the Boston Public Schools. The "Year 3 Report", compiled by the Worcester Public Schools indicates that 93% of teachers from the Worcester Public Schools who attended the EHS Institute in 2005, 2006 or 2007 are still in teaching.
