= Essex High School =

Essex High School may refer to:

- Essex High School (Vermont)
- Essex High School (Virginia)
