= Thomas A. Edison High School (Oregon) =

School in Portland, Oregon

Coordinates: 45.54939°N 122.66348°W

The Thomas A. Edison High School was an alternative public junior/senior high school in Portland, Oregon, United States, in the Portland school district.

It was founded in September 1935, and occupied the former Albina Homestead School building at Beech and Mallory streets in Portland. The school was the successor to the Better Scholarship High School and Probationary High School programs at the Failing School, which was otherwise an elementary school. Academic and vocational classes were offered. The "Girls' Division," formally known as "Girls' Edison High School," was split in September 1936, and moved to the vacated Brooklyn School building. In September 1938, the program moved again to the Holliday School building, where its name was changed to "Jane Addams High School for Girls." The Boys' Edison High School moved to Sabin School in 1939 because of low attendance at the Sabin School, and the Edison program was renamed Sabin High School.

The schools were closed by June 13, 1947, partly because the space was needed for increased elementary school enrollment due to the baby boom.
