= Episcopal High School =

Episcopal High School is a common name for high schools affiliated with the Episcopal Church in the United States of America, including:

- Episcopal High School (Alexandria, Virginia)
- Episcopal High School (Baton Rouge, Louisiana)
- Episcopal High School (Bellaire, Texas)
- Episcopal High School of Jacksonville, Florida
