= Silliman =

Silliman is a surname. Notable people with the surname include:

- Aldine Silliman Kieffer (1840–1904), American musician
- Benjamin Silliman (1779–1864), American chemist
- Benjamin Silliman Jr. (1816–1885), American chemist
- Benjamin D. Silliman (1805–1901), American lawyer and politician
- Brian R. Silliman, American marine conservation biologist
- Douglas Silliman (born 1960), American diplomat
- Gold Selleck Silliman (1732–1790), American attorney and Revolutionary War figure
- Horace Brinsmade Silliman (1825-1910), founder of Silliman University
- Jael Silliman, American writer
- James W. Silliman (1905–1976), American politician
- Lynn Silliman (born 1959), American rower
- Mary Silliman (1736–1818), American matriarch
- Mike Silliman (1944–2000), American basketball player
- Randolph Silliman Bourne (1886–1918), American writer
- Robert Hillyer aka Robert Silliman Hillyer (1895–1961), American poet
- Ron Silliman (born 1946), American poet
- Samuel Cook Silliman (1742–1795), American politician
- Scott Silliman (born 1943), American judge and political scientist

== See also ==
- Silliman College at Yale University
- Silliman University, Dumaguete City, Philippines
- USC&GS Silliman

== See also ==
- Sillimanite
