= Nooth =

Nooth may refer to:

- Louise van der Nooth (1630s–1654), maid of honour of Queen Christina of Sweden
- John Mervin Nooth (1737–1828), English physician, scientist, and army officer
- Charlotte Nooth, Irish poet
- Lord Nooth, a fictional character from the film Early Man
