= The Computer and the Brain =

Book

- First edition
- Author: John von Neumann
- Language: English
- Publisher: Yale University Press
- Publication date: 1958
- Pages: 96

The Computer and the Brain is an unfinished book by mathematician John von Neumann, begun shortly before his death and first published in 1958. Von Neumann was an important figure in computer science, and the book discusses how the brain can be viewed as a computing machine. The book is speculative in nature, but von Neumann discusses several important differences between brains and computers of his day (such as processing speed and parallelism), as well as suggesting directions for future research.

At only 96 pages, the book was originally intended for Yale's Silliman lectures, but it was published posthumously. The first edition was published in 1958 with a preface by Klara Dan von Neumann. The second edition, published in 2000, contains a foreword by Paul Churchland and Patricia Churchland that places von Neumann's views in the context of science at that time. The third edition, published in 2012, features a foreword by Ray Kurzweil. It has the ISBN 9780300181111.

== See also ==
- Computational theory of mind
