= Klára Dán von Neumann =

Hungarian-American mathematician (1911–1963)

- Dán von Neumann photographed by Alfred Eisenstaedt in 1957
- Born: Klára Dán; August 18, 1911; Budapest, Kingdom of Hungary
- Died: November 10, 1963 (aged 52); San Diego, California, United States
- Citizenship: Hungarian; American
- Known for: MANIAC I; ENIAC
- Spouses: Ferenc Engel (m. 1931; div. 1936); Andor Rapoch (m. 1936; div. 1938); John von Neumann (m. 1938; died 1957); Carl Eckart (m. 1958–1963)
- Scientific career
- Fields: Computer science
- Workplaces: Princeton University; Site Y, Los Alamos

Klára Dán von Neumann (née Dán; 18 August 1911 – 10 November 1963) was a Hungarian-American mathematician, self-taught engineer and computer scientist, noted as one of the first computer programmers. She was the first woman to execute modern-style code on a computer. Dán made significant contributions to the world of programming, including work on the Monte Carlo method, ENIAC, and MANIAC I.

== Early life ==
Klára Dán, known as Klári to her friends and family, was born in Budapest, Hungary on August 18, 1911, to Károly Dán and Kamilla Stadler, a wealthy Jewish couple. Her father had previously served in the Austro-Hungarian Army as an officer during World War I, and the family moved to Vienna to escape Béla Kun's Hungarian Soviet Republic. Once the regime was overthrown, the family moved back to Budapest. Her family was wealthy, and often held parties where Dán would meet many different people from various stations in life.

At 14, Dán became a national champion in figure skating. She attended Veres Pálné Gimnázium in Budapest and graduated in 1929.

== Work ==
After their wedding, Dán and John von Neumann immigrated to the United States, where he held a professorship at Princeton University. Upon immigration, Dán listed her profession as "housewife". However, after the Attack on Pearl Harbor, more jobs for women opened up in the U.S. and Dán was able to secure a position at Princeton. Her title was "Head of Statistical Computing Group". In 1943, J. von Neumann moved to Los Alamos National Laboratory in New Mexico to work on calculations as part of the Manhattan Project. Dán remained at Princeton until 1946, working at the university's Office of Population Research. At this time, she was sharing an office with Adele Goldstine. Dán also enrolled in calculus at Princeton in 1947. Both Goldstine and Dán were then contracted to work in Los Alamos New Mexico in early summer of 1947.

After the war, Dán joined von Neumann in New Mexico to program the MANIAC I machine, which could store data, designed by her husband and Julian Bigelow. This work was entirely novel, a feat that had never been completed before. Dán scored the job, however, due to the belief at the time that programming was menial work, similar to human computing, a job commonly held by women. For decades after this, society would devalue the work of programming, which ultimately allowed women to be a large part of the workforce. More specifically, Dán's job was to translate mathematical instructions into a language the computer could understand. To do this she would look up "codes" - numbers that correspond to instructions for the computer. This is the origin of the word "coder", and the birth of the modern code paradigm. This coding also required her to ask for sections of the machine to be rebuilt, as there was not a clear distinction between software and hardware at the time. She then worked on the ENIAC (Electronic Numerical Integrator and Computer) on a project with von Neumann to produce the first successful meteorological forecast on a computer. Dán designed new controls for ENIAC and was one of its primary programmers. She trained a group of people drawn from the Manhattan Project to store programs as binary code. During this time she also wrote the code for the first computer simulation by the Monte Carlo method.

She taught the meteorologists how to program ENIAC where she managed 100,000 punch cards ensuring there were no data loss. She worked for 32 days on the project, where she saw through and checked the final code.

After her husband's death from cancer in 1957, Dán wrote the preface to his Silliman Lectures. The lectures were published in 1958 and later edited and published by Yale University Press as The Computer and the Brain. She also wrote an unpublished memoir entitled A Grasshopper in Very Tall Grass. In 2022, Dán was the subject of a multi-episode season of the Lost Women of Science podcast.

== Personal life and death ==
=== Marriages ===
Dán met her first husband, Ferenc Engel, at one of her parents' parties. They wed in 1931. Dán was 19 and described herself as "frighteningly in love." Engel was an avid gambler, and took Dán on many trips to casinos. They were at a casino in Monte Carlo when Dán met John von Neumann, whom she would later marry, for the first time. He explained that he had perfected a way to ensure that he would win roulette every time, but promptly lost all his money trying to prove his point. Afterwards, he asked Dán to buy him a drink, a consequential interaction which would set the stage for their long friendship and eventual romance.

Eventually, after a particularly tumultuous trip through Southern Europe, Engel's gambling became too much of a problem for Dán and she divorced him. She remarried one month later, this time to Andor Rapoch, an investment banker 18 years her senior. Throughout her marriage to Rapoch, Dán maintained contact with John von Neumann.

In 1938, after von Neumann went through a divorce himself, Dán divorced Rapoch and married von Neumann. Klára and John von Neumann were socially active within the local academic community, and their white clapboard house on Westcott Road was one of Princeton's largest private residences.

In 1955, John von Neumann was diagnosed with metastatic cancer, which may have been caused by exposure to radiation at Los Alamos National Laboratory. He died in 1957.

In 1958, a year after von Neumann's death, Dán married her fourth husband, oceanographer and physicist Carl Eckart, and moved to La Jolla, California.

=== 1939 Budapest visit ===
On August 30, 1939, with the start of World War II looming, Dán traveled back to Budapest by boat to convince her parents and in-laws to leave the country. Her father did not adjust well to leaving his home and factory, and committed suicide later that year.

=== Pregnancy and stepdaughter ===
In June 1942, Dán suffered a late-term miscarriage. She never had children of her own.

Her stepdaughter, Marina von Neumann Whitman (March 6 1935 – May 20 2025), was two years old when Dán and von Neumann married, and grew up to become a prominent economist, automobile executive, and professor of business administration and public policy.

=== Death ===
In 1963, Dán drove from her La Jolla home to the beach. Her body was found washed up on Windansea Beach. She was wearing a dress filled with 15 pounds of wet sand. The San Diego coroner's office listed her death as a suicide. She was 52 years old.
