= Twin Peaks (Sequoia National Park) =

Double summit in Sequoia National Park, California, United States

- Location within California Location within the United States

Highest point
- Elevation: 10,463 ft (3,189 m)
- Coordinates: 36°39′43″N 118°42′51″W

Geography
- Parent range: Sierra Nevada

Climbing
- Easiest route: A scramble

Twin Peaks is a double summit, in Sequoia National Park, California, United States. The highest has an elevation of 10,463 feet (3,189 m).

== Composition ==
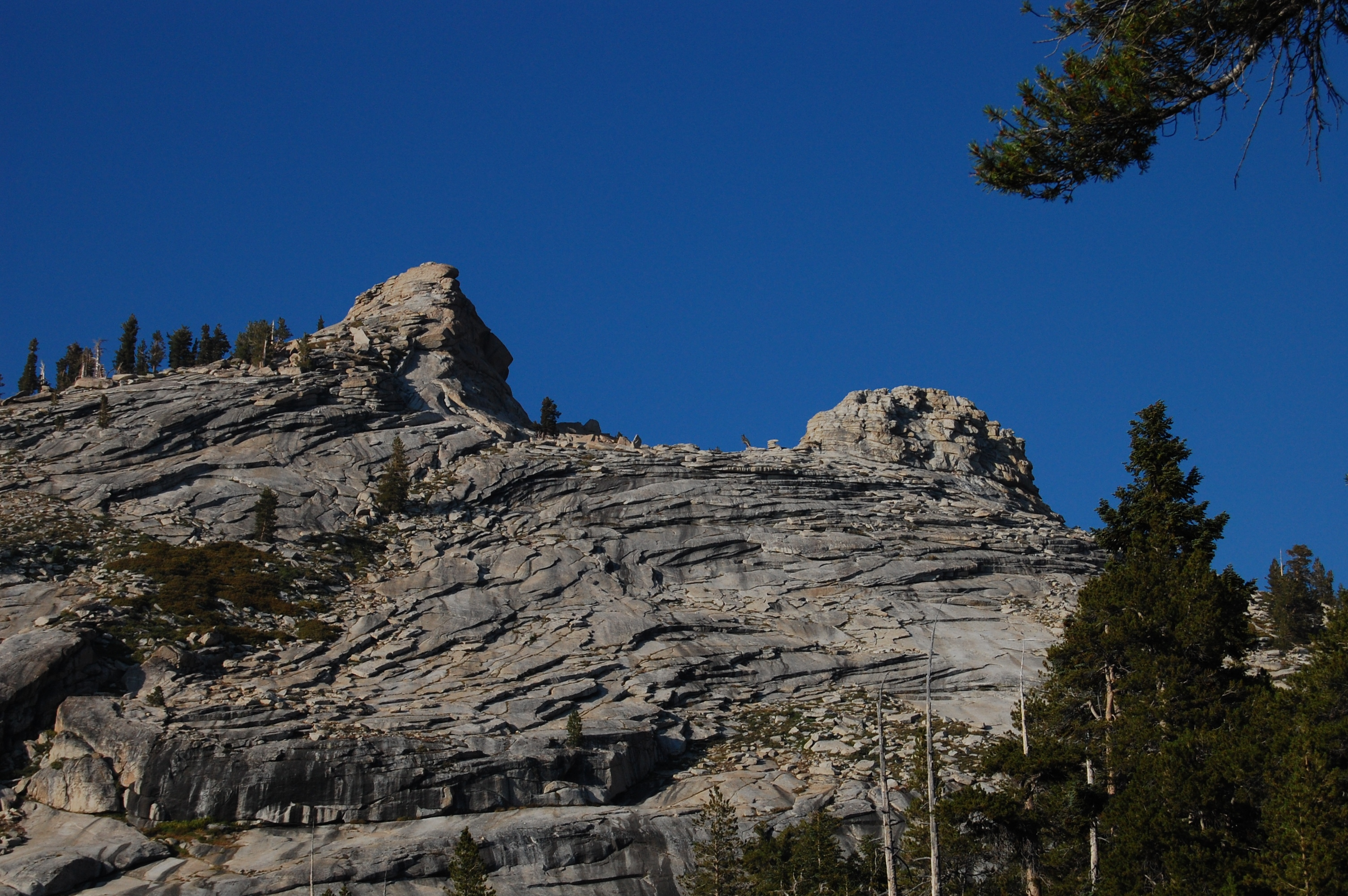
Twin Peaks, from Twin Lakes area

Twin Peaks consist of exfoliating granite.

== The area ==
Twin Peaks stand quite near Silliman Pass, Mount Silliman and Twin Lakes. The Kings-Kaweah Divide crosses through both summits.

== The climb ==
They are best climbed from Lodgepole, and the hike via Silliman Pass is about 17 miles (27 km) round trip. It is also possible to climb them, from Twin Lakes.
