= Gold Selleck Silliman =

American lawyer

- Born: May 7, 1732; Fairfield, Connecticut, United States.
- Died: 1790 (aged 57–58); Fairfield, Connecticut, United States
- Education: Yale College (BA)
- Alma mater: Yale University
- Occupations: Attorney, military officer
- Spouse: Mary Fish Noyes Silliman (married 1775–1790)
- Children: 2
- Parents: Ebenezer Silliman (father); Abigail (Selleck) Silliman (mother)

Gold Selleck Silliman (May 7, 1732–1790) was a Connecticut militia General during the American War for Independence. He is the father of Professor Benjamin Silliman.

== Biography ==
Silliman was born in Fairfield, Connecticut, graduated from Yale University and practiced law and served as a crown attorney before the American Revolution. He was appointed Colonel of the Fourth Regiment, Connecticut militia, in May 1775 and became Brigadier General in 1776. He patrolled the southwestern border of Connecticut, where the loyalists of Westchester County, New York, caused constant irritation and concern for patriot towns and farms along the Connecticut coast. He also fought with the main army during the New York Campaign of 1776 and opposed the British raid on Danbury in 1777. At the beginning of Tryon's raid on Danbury, Connecticut, Silliman was at his home in Fairfield. As soon as he heard word of the British landing on the coast, he sent out expresses to alarm the nearby towns and to collect the militia. By noon the next day he arrived in Redding, Connecticut, with five hundred men and was joined by Major General David Wooster and Brigadier General Benedict Arnold in the Battle of Ridgefield.

One night in May 1779, nine Tories crossed the sound in a whale boat from Lloyd's Neck. One of the Tories had been previously employed by Silliman as a carpenter, so he knew the house well. Eight of the men forced their way into the house at midnight and took the general and his adult son. They were taken to Oyster Bay, New York, and finally to Flatbush.

The Americans had no prisoner of equal rank to exchange for Silliman, so they captured one. Thomas Jones, a highly reputed loyalist, was captured in November 1779 by Continental Navy Captain David Hawley and brought back to Connecticut. Silliman and Jones were exchanged in May 1780, with Silliman's son being exchanged as well. These events were accurately depicted in the 1994 TV film Mary Silliman's War by Heritage Films, based on the 1984 biography of Silliman's second wife by Joy and Richard Buel. Silliman died on July 21, 1790.

== Family ==
Silliman was the son of Abigail Selleck (the daughter of Abigail Gold and Jonathan Selleck) and Ebenezer Silliman (the son of Sara Hull and Robert Silliman). Their son Benjamin Silliman was born in a tavern, originally the home of Ebenezer Hawley in Trumbull, Connecticut, after Benjamin's mother, Mary Silliman, fled Fairfield ahead of a British and Loyalist raiding party. Benjamin was the first professor of science at Yale University and the first American to distill petroleum, later becoming the namesake of Silliman College.

The couple's other son, Gold Selleck Silliman, married Hepsa Ely Silliman, of whom the Silliman Memorial Lectures are named after.

== See also ==
- Silliman Memorial Lectures
