= James Robinson (dentist) =

British dentist & anaesthetist (1813–1862)

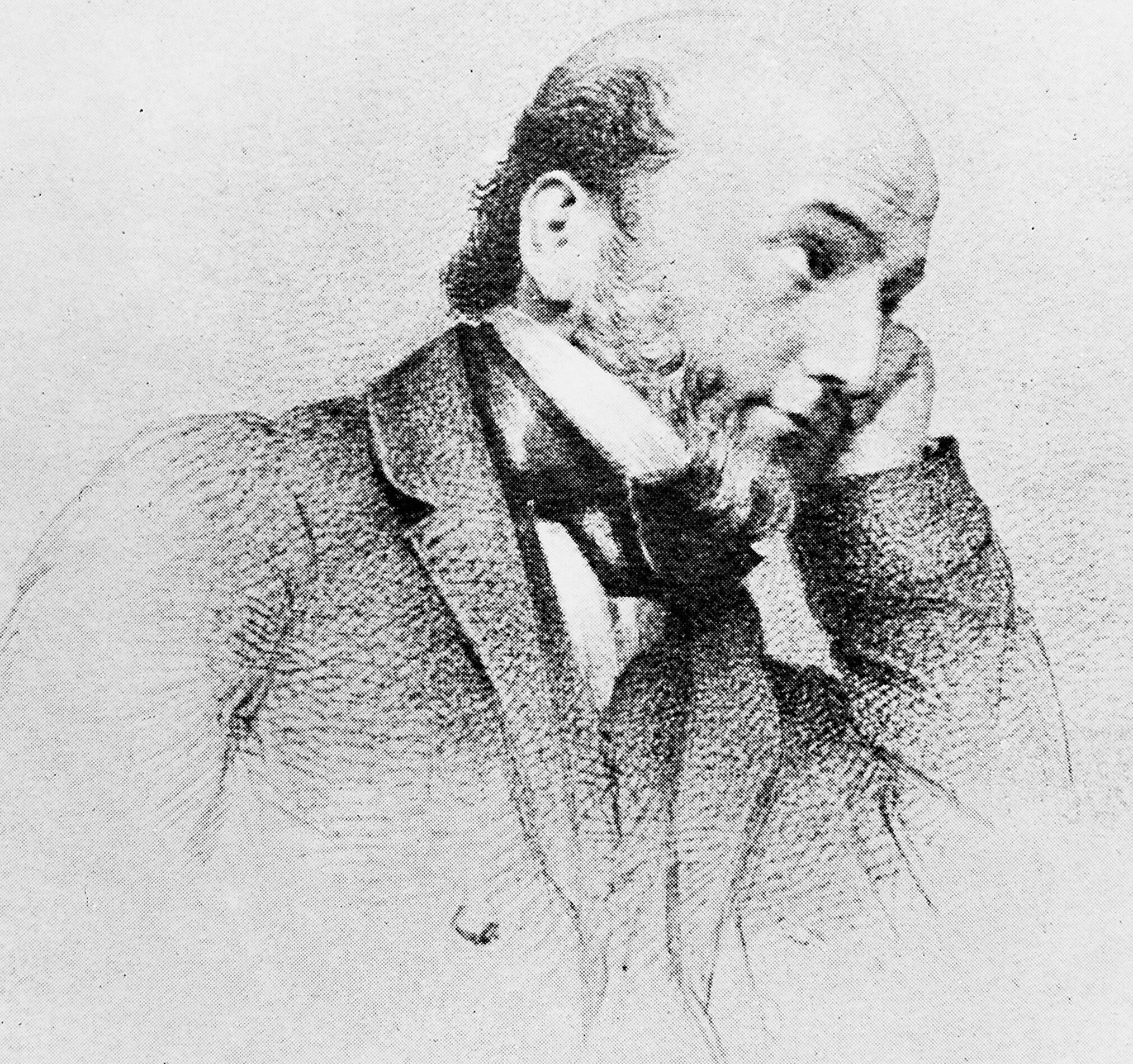
- Born: November 22, 1814; Hampshire, England
- Died: March 4, 1862 (aged 47)
- Education: University College London
- Medical career
- Field: Dentistry

James Robinson (22 November 1813 – 4 March 1862) was a British dentist and anaesthetist. On 19 December 1846, he became the first person to carry out general anaesthesia in Britain when he administered ether to a patient undergoing a tooth extraction. The next year, he published A Treatise on the Inhalation of the Vapour of Ether, perhaps the first textbook of anaesthesia. Robinson's work influenced the prominent anaesthetist John Snow. Robinson also undertook initiatives to reform the dental profession in Britain. At the age of 48, he died of blood loss following a gardening accident; his London home and the site where he first administered anaesthesia are commemorated with plaques.

== Biography ==
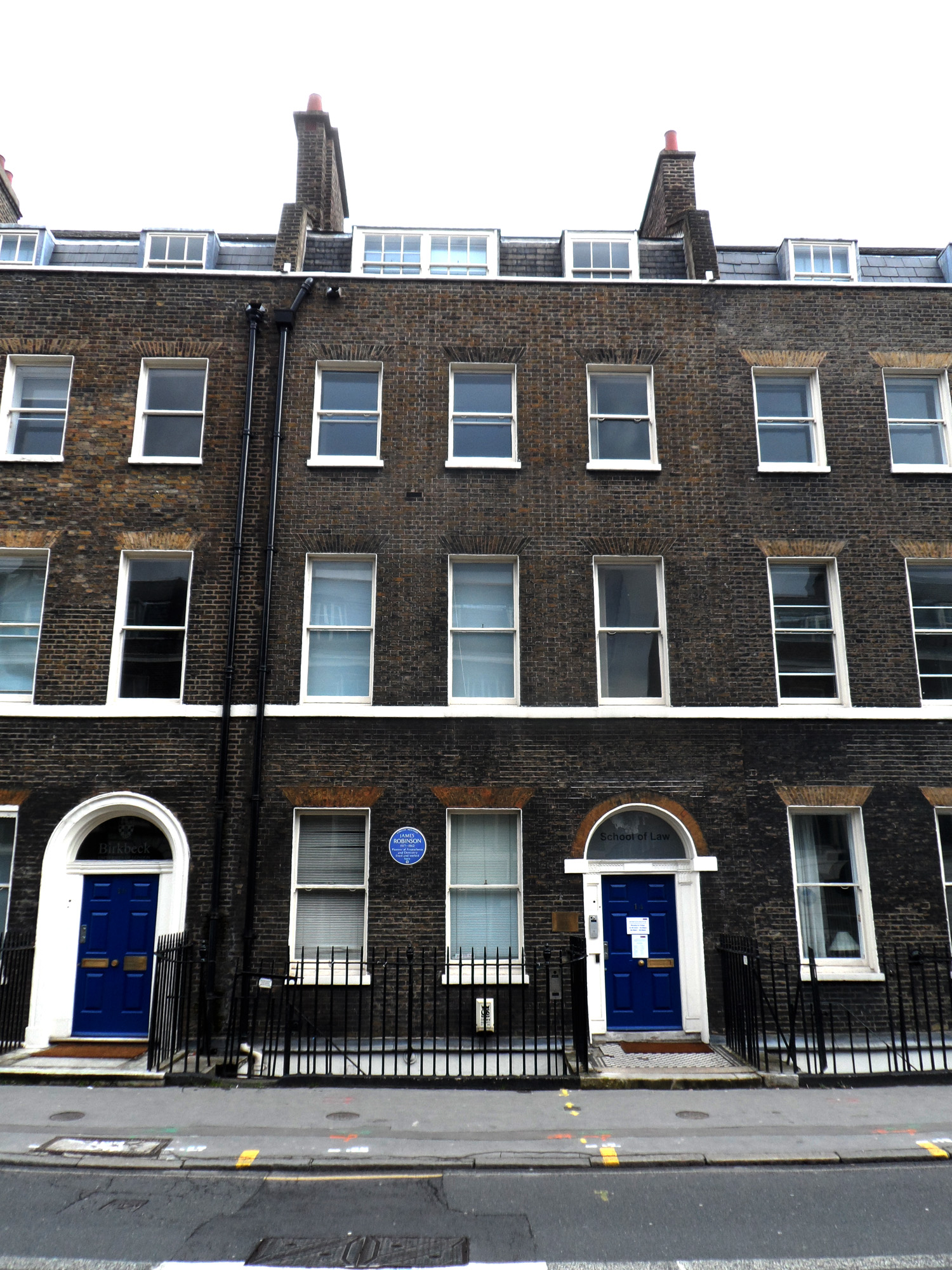
Robinson's former residence at 14 Gower Street

Robinson was born on 22 November 1813 in Hampshire, England. At 14, he undertook an apprenticeship with a surgeon and chemist in London, and beginning in 1830 he attended medical courses at Guy's Hospital and University College. He did not complete his studies or obtain any official qualifications, but he began practising dentistry in London as early as 1833, and became surgeon dentist at the Metropolitan Hospital the next year.

Early in his career Robinson made efforts to reform the—then largely unregulated and disreputable—dental profession in Britain. In 1842 he established a professional society for "ethical" dentists, but this initiative attracted little support. Robinson also founded two short-lived dental journals, the British Quarterly Journal of Dental Surgery and The Forceps, in 1843 and 1844 respectively—the Quarterly was the first dental journal in Britain—and in 1846 he published a textbook of dentistry, The Surgical and Mechanical Treatment of the Teeth. Robinson quickly earned an international reputation as a skilled dentist, and the Baltimore College of Dental Surgeons awarded him an honorary doctorate in 1846.

Robinson conducted his dental practice from his home at 14 Gower Street in Bloomsbury, which was just down the street from the residence of Francis Boott, a retired American physician. On 17 December 1846, Boott received a letter from Jacob Bigelow detailing the Boston dentist William Thomas Green Morton's successful use of ether for general anaesthesia during an operation on a neck tumour. He resolved, with Robinson's help, to test this new technique. On the 19th of December, at Boott's home on 24 Gower Street, Robinson administered ether to a young woman undergoing a tooth extraction—the first use of general anaesthesia in Britain. (Note: On the same day, in Dumfries, the surgeon William Scott apparently carried out an operation under ether, but no details of the event have survived.) The gas was administered using a homemade inhaler based on a water carbonation device invented by John Mervin Nooth. Robinson gave several demonstrations of his technique; those in attendance included Robert Liston and John Snow, who went on to make further explorations of ether's anaesthetic properties.

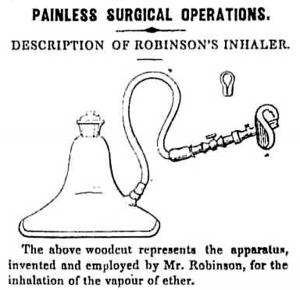
A contemporary illustration of Robinson and Boott's ether inhaler

In February 1847 Robinson published A Treatise on the Inhalation of Ether, which is sometimes regarded as the first textbook of anaesthesia in the world, though this title has also been claimed by an early version of John Snow's 1847 On the Inhalation of Ether and by Mafutsuto-Ron, an 1839 publication by Gendai Kamada documenting the induction of anaesthesia using a herbal cocktail.

About 4 months after his initial foray into anaesthesia, Robinson abandoned the subject and dedicated himself again to dentistry. In 1848 he took up the position of surgeon dentist at the Royal Free Hospital, and in 1849 he was appointed as Prince Albert's personal dentist. During the mid-1850s he resumed his initiatives to reform the dental profession. He was the inaugural president of the College of Dentists in 1856 (though he would later resign the post due to frictions between the college and the Odontological Society of London) and was involved in the founding of the Royal Dental Hospital and the University College Hospital Dental Hospital.

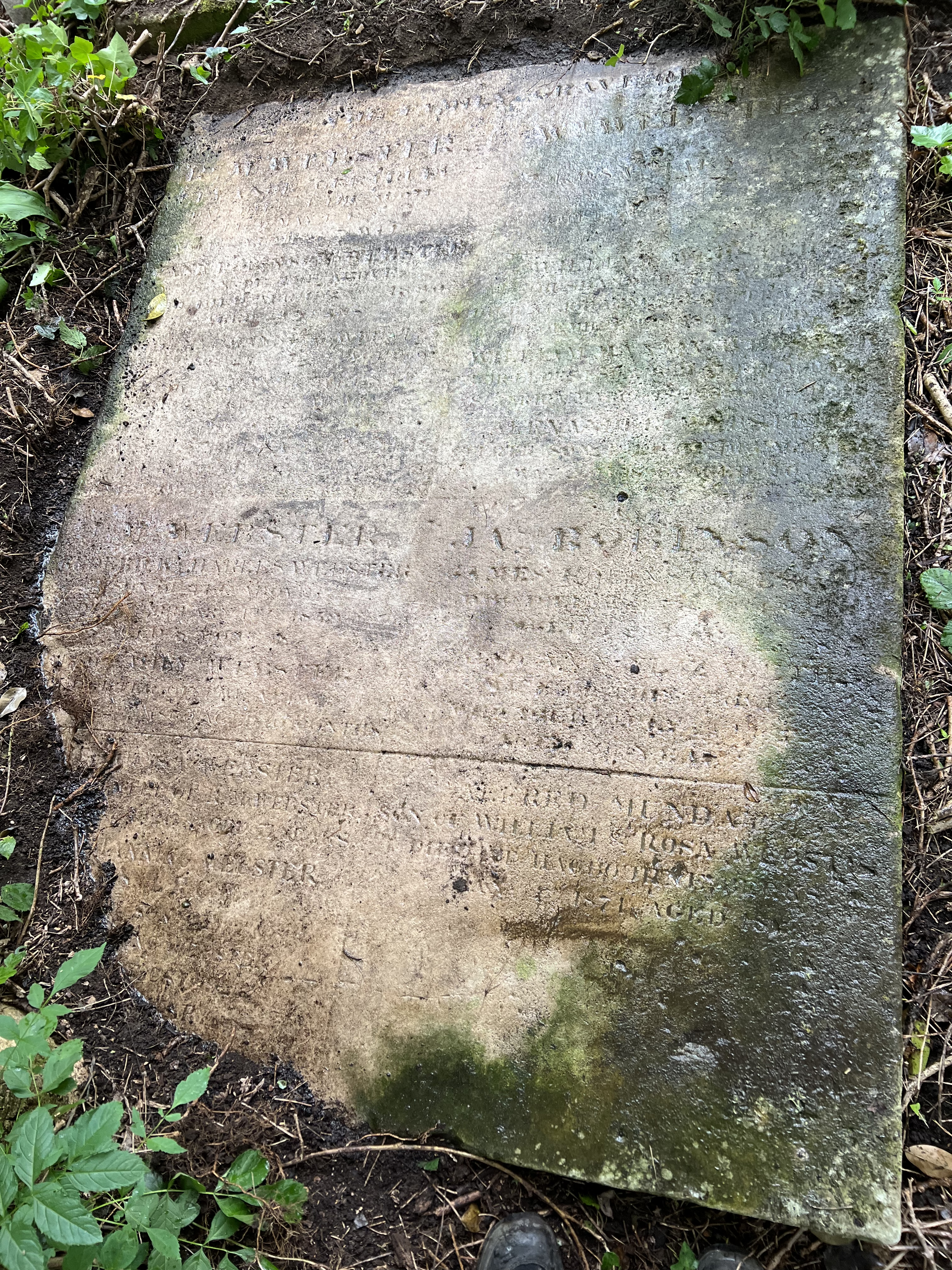
Grave of James Robinson

== Death and legacy ==
In 1862, Robinson was pruning a tree in his garden at Kenton when the knife slipped and wounded his leg, damaging the femoral artery. Despite receiving medical attention, he died of blood loss two days later, on the fourth of March and was buried on the western side of Highgate Cemetery. He was buried in the family plot of his wife's family, the Websters. A large ledger stone is on the grave (plot no.4642).

He was survived by his wife, Ann Elizabeth Webster. English Heritage commemorated Robinson's former residence at 14 Gower Street with a plaque in 1991. A plaque also stands at 24 Gower Street to commemorate the administration of the first anaesthetic.
