= Charlotte Nooth =

English poet

- Born: Charlotte Nooth; 1784; Dorchester, Dorset
- Died: 1875 (aged 90–91); France
- Known for: poet and translator

Charlotte Nooth (1784 - c. 1875) was an English poet and novelist who published her works in the early 19th century.

== Life ==
Nooth's dates are uncertain, though she is thought to have been born in the 18th century with recent sources giving her year of birth as 1784. Her parents, Elizabeth (née Brindley) and James Nooth, married 1782 in Somerset. Nooth was born in Dorchester, Dorset, and was baptised on 9 February 1784. James Nooth was a surgeon, whose brother was John Mervin Nooth. Her maternal uncle was James Brindley. There are no records of her education, but her work demonstrates a "good grounding in romance languages".

Nooth's 1815 book is dedicated to Duke of Kent, who was her father's patron. The subscribers to her work included aristocracy and gentry, with a many members of the military. This 1815 book hints at family hardship and the need to raise money, likely due to the death of her father. She addressed a poem in 1807 to Richard Valpy on his birthday, which he responded to with a sonnet. She has been wrongly identified as Irish due to poems written during holidays to Ireland in 1806 and 1807. Some of these poems are written in a sort of Irish dialect.

Eglantine (1816) is a two volume novel. In 1826 she published a translation of Henri Grégoire from French, An Essay on the Nobility of the Skin; or, The Prejudice of White Persons.

Until 2024, this is where further details of Nooth and her work after 1826 were uncertain. Newspaper research has shown that she wrote a poem to mark Valpy's retirement in 1829 that she signed as "C. G. Desmonstiers (late Charlotte Nooth)" from Paris. In 1828, she wrote to Walter Scott from Paris. It is presumed that her husband was Marquis Desmonstiers de Merinville. She is last recorded in 1876, in an advertisement seeking relatives to claim her estate, which stated she was "married and died aboard".

== Selected works ==
- Original Poems, Including Ballads, Written in the Dialect of the Northern Parts of Ireland, With a Play, entitled Clare; or, the Nuns of Charity, in Verse, London, 1815.
- Eglantine; or the Family of Fortescue, 2 volumes, London, 1816.
