= Mary Silliman =

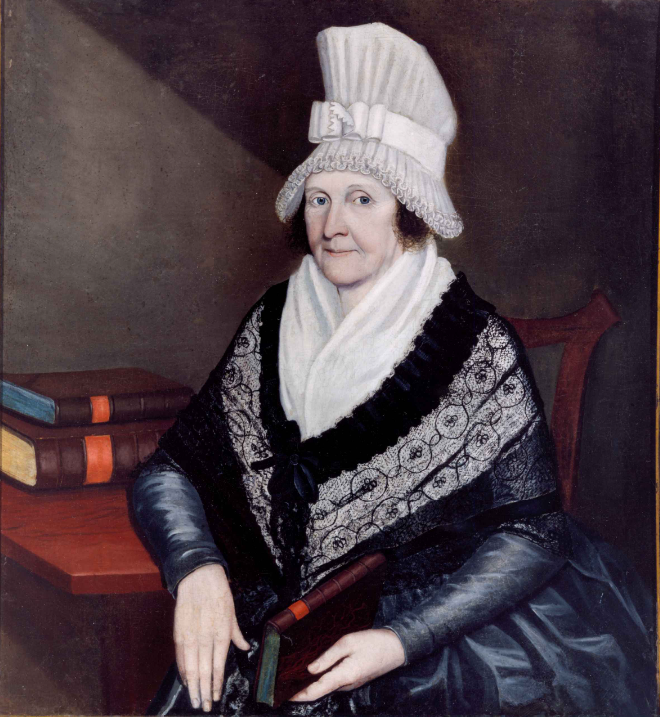
- Died: 1818
- Parent(s): Joseph Fish

Mary Silliman (née Fish, formerly Noyes, later Dickinson; May 30, 1736 - July 2, 1818) was a matriarch in Revolutionary and post-colonial Connecticut and the subject of the 1993 film Mary Silliman's War.

== Marriages ==
Mary Fish was born on May 30, 1736, in Stonington, Connecticut, to Joseph Fish and Mary (Pabodie) Fish. At the age of fifteen, she entered the school of Sarah Osborn, an accomplished woman and a model of female independence. She married John Noyes, the son of the Rev. Joseph Noyes of the First Church in New Haven, on November 16, 1758. Her new husband was a former rector of the Hopkins Grammar School in New Haven who preached occasionally, engaged in modest dealings in the shipping trade, and suffered from epilepsy. Together, they lived in a house on Elm Street in New Haven and had three children who survived to adulthood: Joseph in 1761, John in 1762 and James in 1764. John Noyes senior died in the fall of 1767. He was intestate, and Mary became his executrix. All three sons went on to enter the ministry, following in the footsteps of their father and grandfathers.

Mary and Colonel Gold Selleck Silliman, a lawyer and member of one of Fairfield County’s most influential families, were married on May 24, 1775, in Stonington following a courtship sustained by frequent letters. The new couple moved to Gold’s farm in Fairfield soon after. Their marriage was rooted in lasting friendship, deep affection, and mutual respect. Mary and Gold Silliman had two children together: Gold Selleck (born October 1777) and Benjamin (born August 1779).

== Revolutionary War ==
Knowing that military involvement in the American Revolutionary War could rob her of her second husband through absence or death, Mary learned the workings of his farm as well as knowledge of his financial affairs. Mary fell ill with dysentery in 1776 but upon recovery, ran the Silliman farm, entertained militia officers, housed refugees of war, managed the labor of several enslaved workers and her adult stepson, drew accounts, and collected rent on her late first husband’s farms, all while her husband led the state militia.

On May 2, 1779, a band of Loyalists captured Gold and his son from a previous marriage, Billy, holding them prisoner on a Long Island farm. At the time of their kidnapping, Mary was six months pregnant with their second child; the child Benjamin was born during his father's captivity. Money was a constant struggle, as the family assets suffered from Gold’s indefinite absence and General Washington’s refusal to offer assistance to Gold who, though an officer, was not on active service at the time of his capture. Gold survived a bout of smallpox early in his captivity and often went without the comforts of adequate food and clothing. Correspondence between husband and wife was sparse and delayed.

On the morning of July 7, 1779, a British fleet arrived to mount a full-scale attack on Fairfield, and Mary evacuated her household to North Stratford. Throughout her husband’s captivity, she wrote letters to well-connected men, like Connecticut’s Governor Trumbull, in order to appeal for their help in securing an exchange for Gold. Because the Patriots had no acceptable prisoner to exchange for Gold, some of his friends decided to take one. They chose Tory leader and Chief Justice Thomas Jones of Long Island. On November 6, with the consent of the Governor, Captain David Hawley of Stratford and Captain Samuel Lockwood of Norwalk captured both the Judge and a young man named Willett, whom they hoped to exchange for Billy. Jones was held in Mary's home for a few days before the authorities moved him on. On April 27, 1780, a boat which Mary had hired departed Black Rock Harbor with Judge Jones aboard to return him and bring Silliman back. By coincidence that very same day, Silliman’s New York captors had chosen to send him home, so both prisoners returned safely home.

== Later life ==
Following Gold Selleck Silliman’s death on July 21, 1789, his widow was left in considerable debt. She sold two of her enslaved workers, apparently timing their sale to take advantage of a law being considered by the Connecticut Assembly that would have reduced their value.

Despite financial troubles, she was determined to send her sons Selleck and Benjamin to Yale so that they could benefit from the same education as their brothers and father. Both sons studied law at New Haven. In April 1804, she and Dr. John Dickinson of Middletown were quietly married by her son James in Wallingford. After a series of illnesses and misfortunes, Mary Fish Noyes Silliman Dickinson died on July 2, 1818, aged 82.

== Legacy ==
As her sons grew independent and had children of their own, Mary assumed the role of family matriarch, advising and nurturing her spreading family circle. Her son Benjamin described her as a "heroic woman". Ultimately, historians Joy Day Buel and Richard Buel Jr. describe Mary as “less a daughter of the Revolution than a child of the Puritans.” The Silliman Family Papers, housed at Yale University, include a wealth of Mary’s writing in the form of her journal, papers, and letters, and are a rich resource.

The story of her experience during the American Revolution is depicted in the 1993 film Mary Silliman’s War, produced by Heritage Films. The film, based on the Buels' The Way of Duty, seeks to dramatize three major themes surrounding the Revolution: the war’s divisiveness within colonial communities, the role of women in the struggles of the Revolution, and the role of religion in light of the war. She is portrayed as a devout, prosperous matron determined against all odds to reunite with her beloved husband.

== See also ==
- Women in the American Revolution
- List of plays and films about the American Revolution
- First Great Awakening
