= Silliman Pass =

- Interactive map of Silliman Pass
- Elevation: 10,160 ft (3,100 m)
- Traversed by: hiking trail, no roads

Location
- Location: Tulare County, United States
- Range: Sierra Nevada
- Coordinates: 36°39′45″N 118°42′24″W
- Topo map: USGS Sequoia and Kings Canyon National Parks

Silliman Pass is a mountain pass on the border of Sequoia National Park and Kings Canyon National Park.

It stands 10,160 feet (3,100 m) high.

== Location ==
It stands on the Kings-Kaweah Divide, loosely north of Mount Silliman., It is directly south of Twin Peaks.

== Namesake ==
Like Mount Silliman, the pass was named for Benjamin Silliman, professor of chemistry at Yale College.
