= Gendai Kamada =

Japanese surgeon

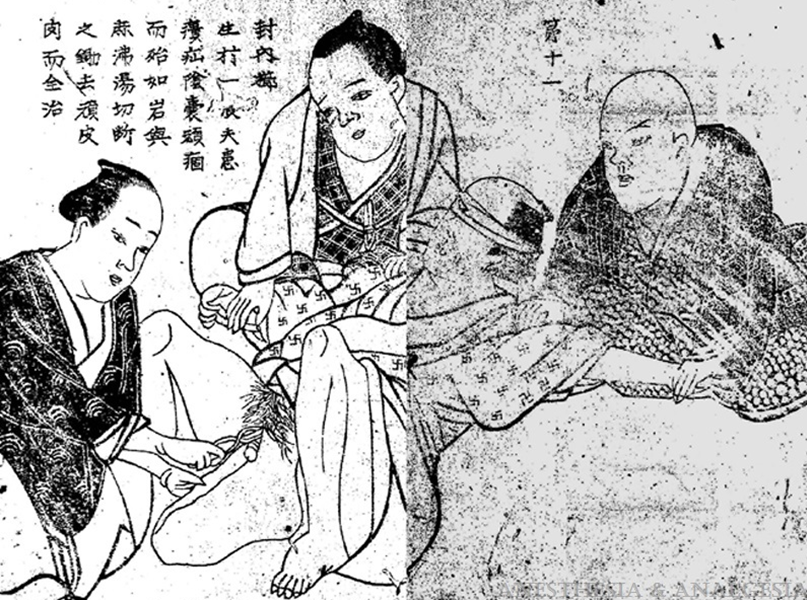
Illustration from Gekakihai-zufu (1840), showing the resection of a testicular tumour under general anaesthesia

Gendai Kamada (Note: Sometimes referred to as "Keishu" rather than "Gendai", a title he had been granted by Hanaoka.) (1794–1854 or 1855) was a Japanese surgeon. Born in Iyo Province, Gendai moved to Kii Province at the age of 18 to study at a private school run by the prominent surgeon Seishu Hanaoka, where he learned how to administer general anaesthesia. Upon completion of his five-year training he opened a clinic in his hometown; he became well known throughout Japan for his surgical prowess, particularly his skill in treating breast cancer.

In 1839 Gendai dictated the text of Mafutsuto-Ron to his student Hajime Matsuoka; this 10-page booklet has been called the earliest textbook of anaesthesia in the world. The work provides detailed instructions on the administration of mafutsuto (also known as tsusensan )—a herbal cocktail developed by Seishu Hanaoka to induce anaesthesia—including pre-operative care, contraindications for the procedure and methods for assessing the depth of anaesthesia. Contemporary surgeons used Mafutsuto-Ron to guide their practice, and it inspired later Japanese texts on general anaesthesia.

In 1840 Gendai published a surgical casebook titled Gekakihai-zufu (Illustrations of Surgical Cases), which contains some of the earliest known illustrations of surgery under anaesthesia; and Mafutsuto-Ron would later form the first volume of Gendai's ten-volume Gekakihai (Book on Surgical Treatment), published in 1851 or 1854. Gendai also published books on anatomical illustration and the treatment of sword wounds, and taught over 300 medical students. He died in 1854 or 1855.
