= Brian R. Silliman =

Conservation biology researcher

- Education: University of Virginia; Brown University
- Scientific career
- Fields: Conservation biology
- Workplaces: Duke University

Brian Reed Silliman is a marine conservation biologist. He is currently the Rachel Carson Distinguished Professor of Marine Conservation Biology at the Nicholas School of the Environment at Duke University. Silliman received an A.B. and M.Sc. from the University of Virginia. He completed his Ph.D. in Ecology and Evolutionary Biology at Brown University in 2004.

Silliman was elected a Fellow of the Ecological Society of America in 2023.

== Books ==
- Effective Conservation Science: Data Not Dogma, Oxford University Press, 2017, ISBN 9780198808978; edited with Peter M. Kareiva and Michelle Marvier
