= Joseph Fish =

American minister (1705–1781)

Reverend Joseph Fish (1705-1781) from Plymouth Colony, Massachusetts, was for fifty years (from 1732-1781) pastor of the Congregational Church in North Stonington, Connecticut.

== Biography ==
Rev. Joseph Fish was born January 28, 1705, in Duxbury, Plymouth County, and died May 26, 1781, in North Stonington, New London County, Connecticut. He went to Harvard and graduated in 1728. Reverend Nathaniel Eells, one of his classmates at Harvard, became his long time friend and neighbor.

Rev. Fish was the third son of Thomas Fish and Margaret Woodward. Fish married Rebecca Pabodie, who was the daughter of William Pabodie and the great-granddaughter of John Alden and Priscilla Mullins. Reverend Joseph Fish and Rebecca had two daughters and one son.

Many of Fish's sermons were published and he was respected as a writer. After his death on May 16, 1781, in North Stonington, New London County, Connecticut, he was buried in the Great Plains cemetery.

== The Eastern Pequot Journals and other writings ==
=== The Eastern Pequot Journals ===
The numerous journals of Joseph Fish about the Pequot were a Yale University project. The participants in the Yale Indian Project considered both Joseph Fish's First Eastern Pequot Journal (March 27, 1775) and Joseph Fish's Tenth Eastern Pequot Journal especially relevant to their study, but many of his other journals and excerpts are also included as valuable primary source materials for their study of the Eastern Pequot and Naraganset tribes which are published online for scholars to read. Participants in the Yale Project reported from many sources and on many facets of the life of Rev. Fish. One item tells of his preaching at the funeral of Samuel Apes. Completion of the project was announced in 2015.

=== School for the Narragansett people ===
Fish's account in his diary of miscegenation among the Narragansett people is discussed in a study of the history of mixed marriages, "Miscegenation and Acculturation in the Narragansett Country of Rhode Island, 1710-1790, by Rhett S. Jones, Professor of History and Africana Studies at Brown University. Professor Jones' article was first published in 1989 and later republished, including its quotations from Fish's diary in an online WordPress blog about mixed race studies.

In the 1760s and early 1770s, Reverend Joseph Fish, as a "standing order minister" from Connecticut, traveled to the Narragansett Country in Rhode Island to preach to the Indians and told in his diary about the attitude of these Amerindians to miscegenation. Fish employed and worked with Joseph Deake, who was once a schoolmaster, to establish a school for the Narragansett. Deake wrote Fish in December, 1765, to say that there might be as many as 151 Indian children who were eligible for the school. He continued, “Besides these there is a considerable Number of mixtures such as mulattos and mustees which the tribe Disowns.”

Fish urged the Narragansett to make room for the “Molattos” who lived with them and “to behave peaceably and friendly towards them, allowing their Children benefit of the School, if there was Room and the Master Leisure from tending Schollars of their own Tribe.” Fish noted that although he rode from Connecticut specifically to teach the Indians, nevertheless the blacks, whites, and mixed bloods all attended his sermons. According to the author of this paper, Fish recorded observations of "cross racial sexual liaisons, such as the case of a “Molatto” named George, who in 1774 was living with an Indian woman who had at one time been married to the “king” of the Narragansett."
