= Mount Silliman =

Mountain in the American state of California

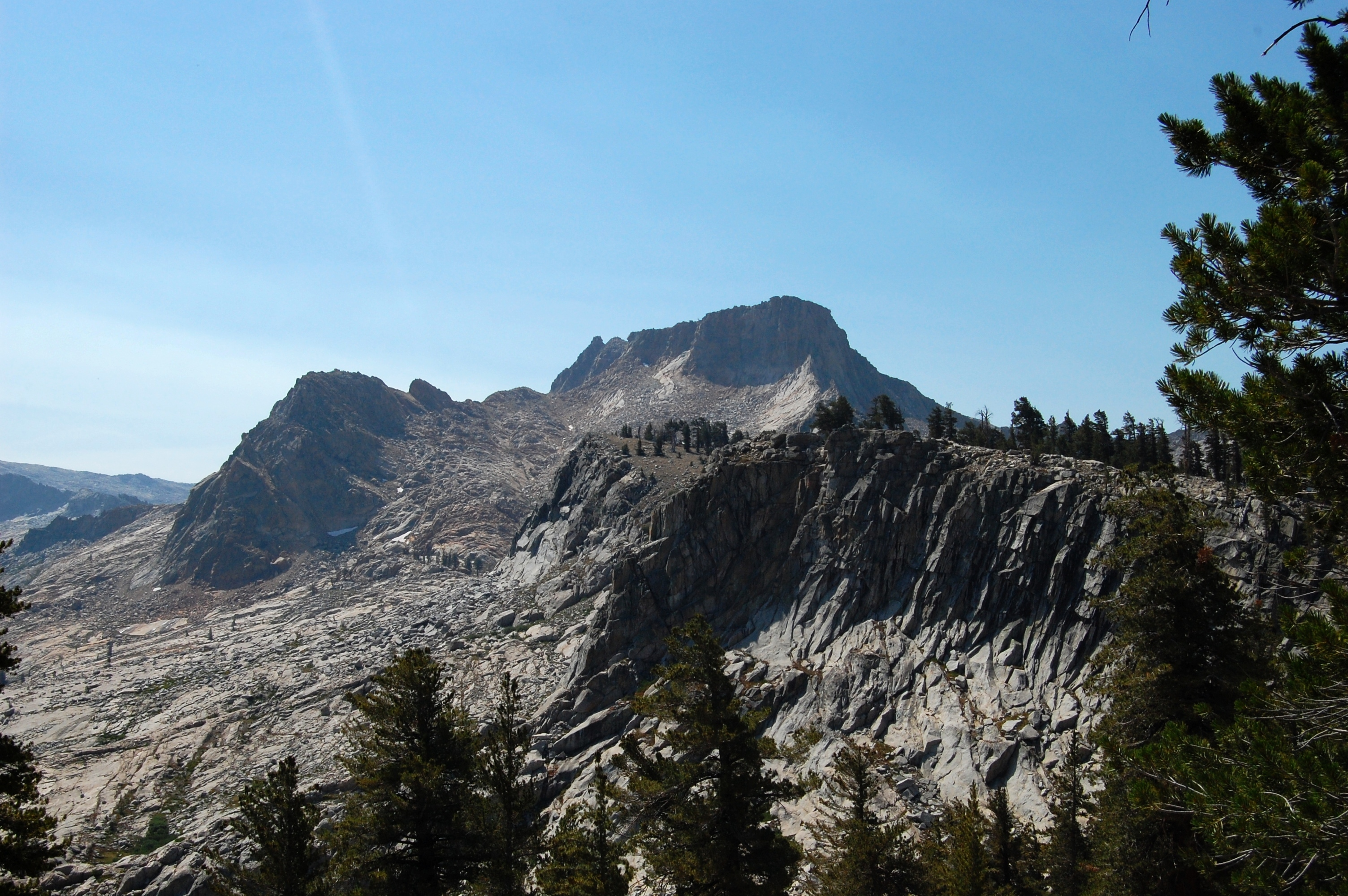
- Mount Silliman, from the north near Silliman Pass

Highest point
- Elevation: 11,193 ft (3,412 m) NAVD 88
- Prominence: 828 ft (252 m)
- Parent peak: Midway Mountain
- Listing: Mountains of California
- Coordinates: 36°38′36″N 118°41′47″W

Geography
- Location within California Location within the United States
- Location: Tulare County, California, U.S.
- Parent range: Sierra Nevada
- Topo map: USGS Mount Silliman

Climbing
- First ascent: June 28, 1864 by Clarence King, James Gardiner, Richard Cotter, and William Brewer
- Easiest route: Scramble from Sillman Pass, class 2

Mount Silliman is a mountain in California along the boundary between Sequoia National Park and Kings Canyon National Park The summit, at 11,193 feet (3,412 m) is on the Sillman Crest, a part of the Kings-Kaweah Divide.

== History ==
The peak was named by members of the Whitney Survey in honor of Benjamin Silliman Jr., professor of chemistry at Yale College. William Brewer, the head of the survey, had studied agricultural chemistry under Silliman. Besides the mountain and crest, there are a pass, a creek, a meadow and a lake that bear the name Silliman.

The first recorded ascent was by Clarence King, James Gardiner, Richard Cotter, and William Brewer on June 28, 1864.

== Climb ==
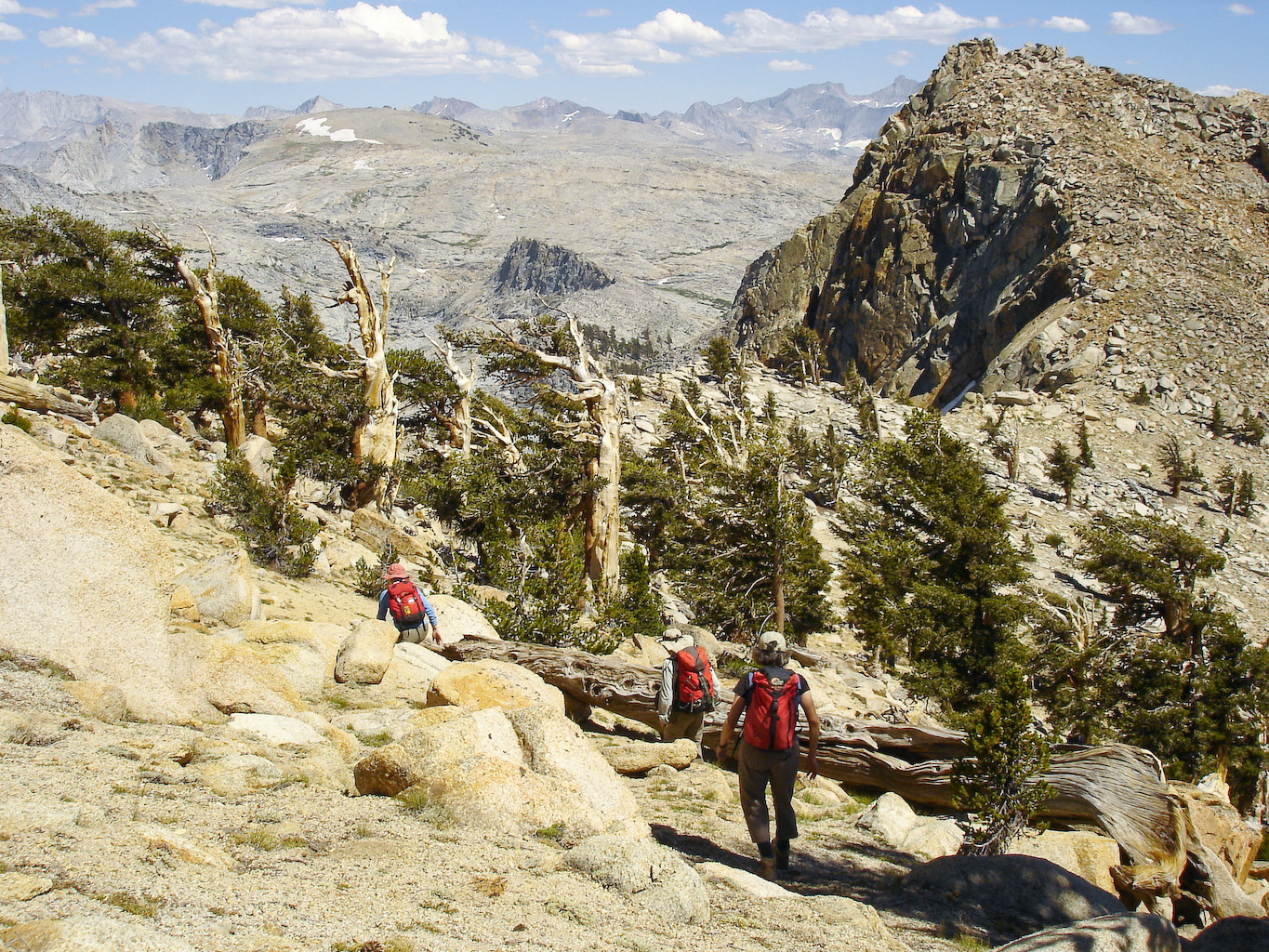
A stand of Foxtail Pines below the summit

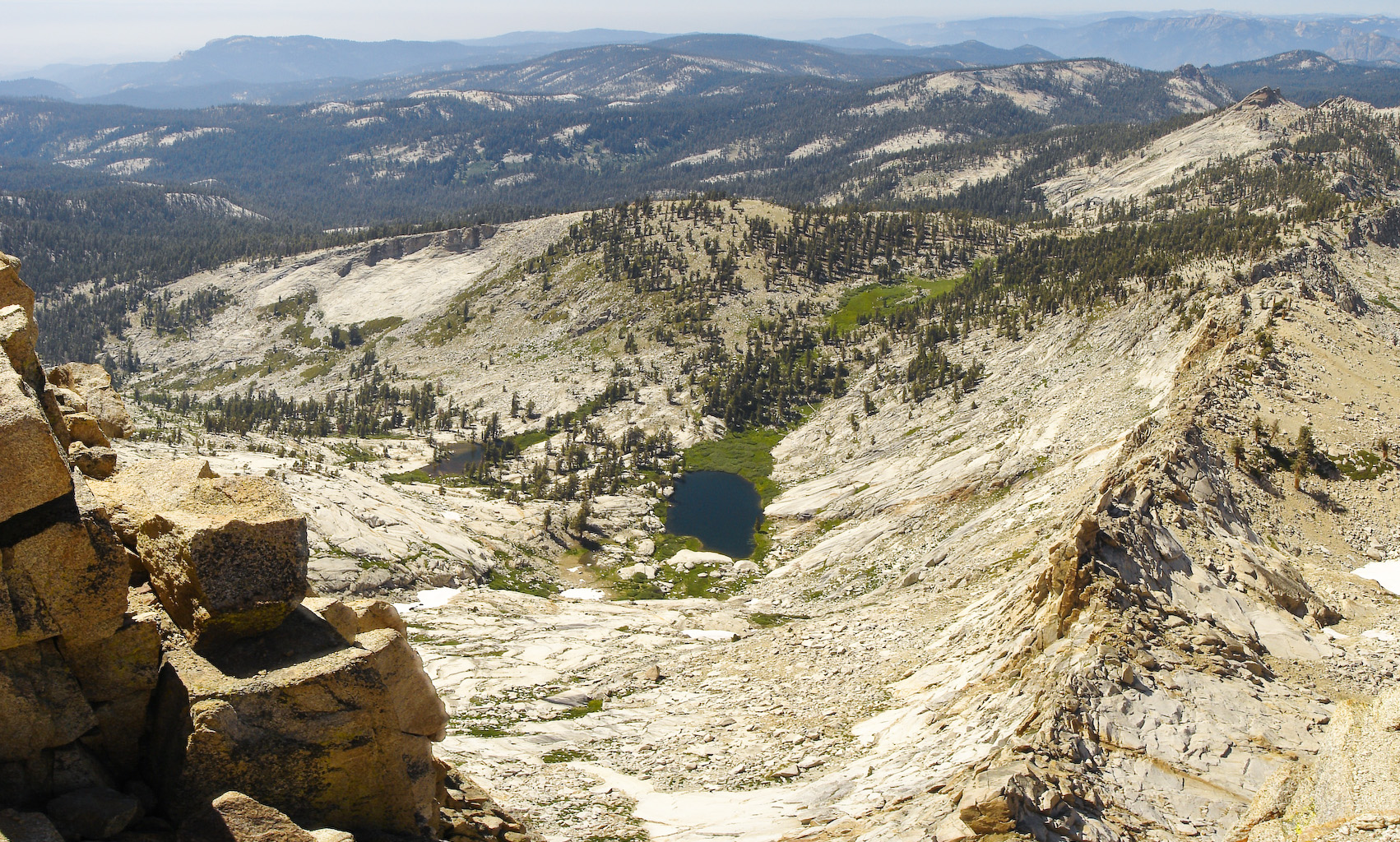
View of Little Lakes from the summit

The summit can be approached by way of the Twin Lakes trail from the Lodgepole Campground on the Generals Highway. From Sillman Pass traverse (class 2) to the east ridge and follow it to the summit. There are several more technical routes to the summit which are mostly class 5.6 or more difficult.

== Flora ==
The rare foxtail pine grows directly below Silliman's summit.

== See also ==
- Silliman Pass, directly below
- Twin Peaks, close by
