= Hepsa Ely Silliman =

American geologist and author

- Born: Hepzibah Ely; October 23, 1778; Huntington, Connecticut, US
- Died: January 22, 1864 (aged 85); Brooklyn, New York City, US
- Resting place: Old Cemetery of Huntington
- Known for: On the Origin of Aerolites
- Spouse: Gold Selleck Silliman

Hepsa Ely Silliman (October 23, 1778 — January 22, 1864) was an American geologist with a specific interest in meteors. She was the author of On the Origin of Aerolites, self published under the name Mrs. G. S. Silliman.

== Biography ==
Ely was born on October 23, 1778 in Huntington, Connecticut. Her father was a member of the Yale College Class of 1769.

She was married to Gold Selleck Silliman, a 1796 graduate of Yale, and brother of Professor Benjamin Silliman, who was namesake of Yale's Silliman College. Silliman was the mother of two sons and two daughters.

Silliman was a geologist with an interest in meteors. In 1859, Silliman published On the Origin of Aerolites under the name Mrs. G. S. Silliman. The foreword states that the topics discussed in the book were "entertained by the writer for many years." The book discusses aerolites, a type of stony meteorite.

== Legacy ==
Silliman passed away on January 22, 1864 in Brooklyn, New York City. She was 85 years old. Her funeral was held at the First Reformed Dutch Church in Brooklyn on January 27th.

Silliman is the namesake of a series of lectures hosted by Yale University since 1901. They were begun following a donation in 1883 by her son, Augustus Ely Silliman, in memory of his mother.
