= Kings-Kaweah Divide =

Drainage divide in Sequoia National Park

The Kings-Kaweah Divide is a divide in Sequoia National Park. It splits the watersheds of the Kaweah River and the Kings River.

== The Divide's extent ==
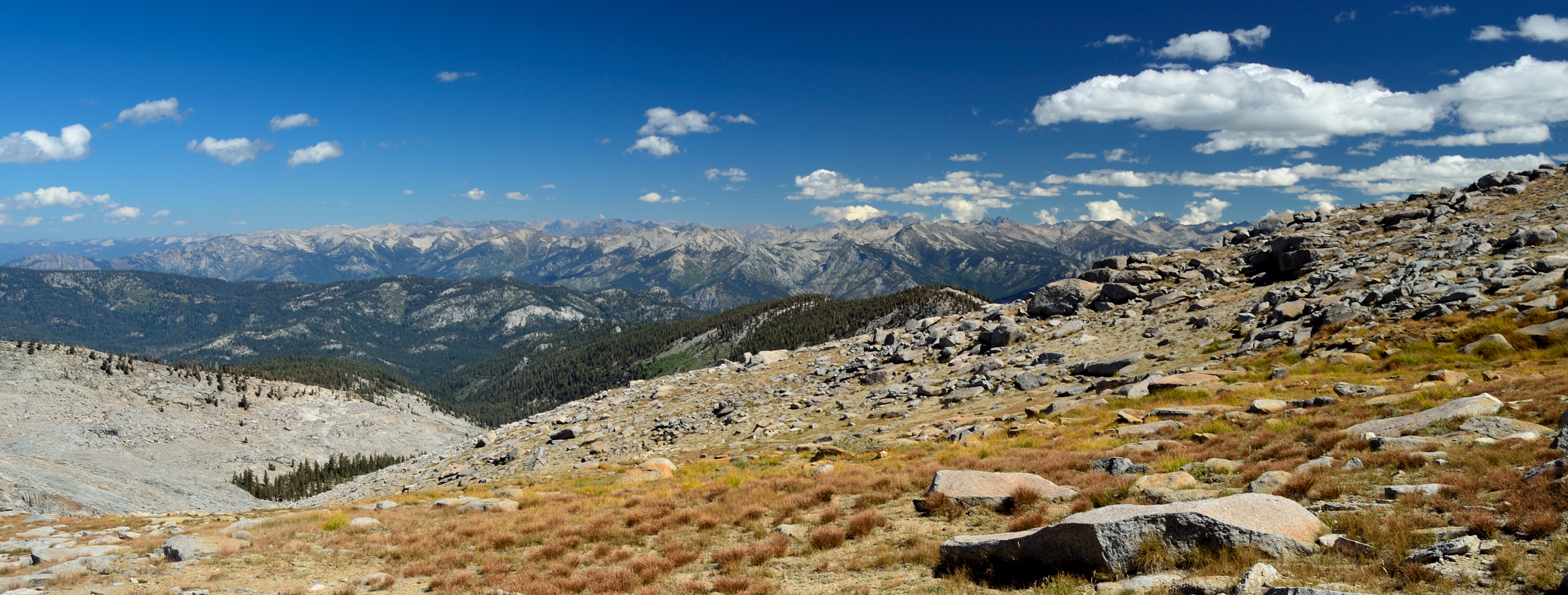
The Kings-Kaweah Divide

The Divide runs from (west to east) from Big Baldy west of Mount Silliman east to Triple Divide Peak, which is part of the Great Western Divide.

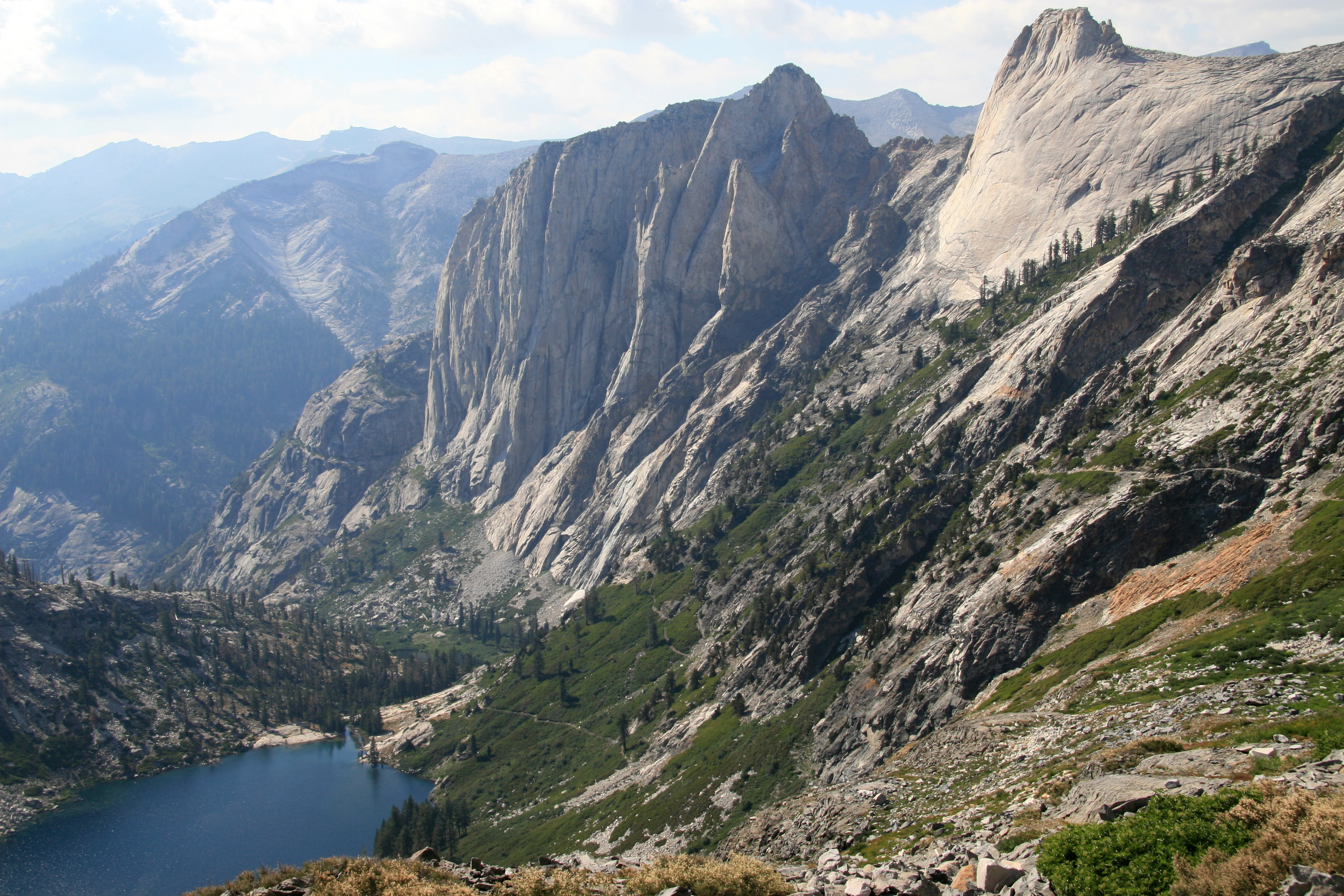
Hamilton Lake, at the headwaters of the Middle Fork of the Kaweah River

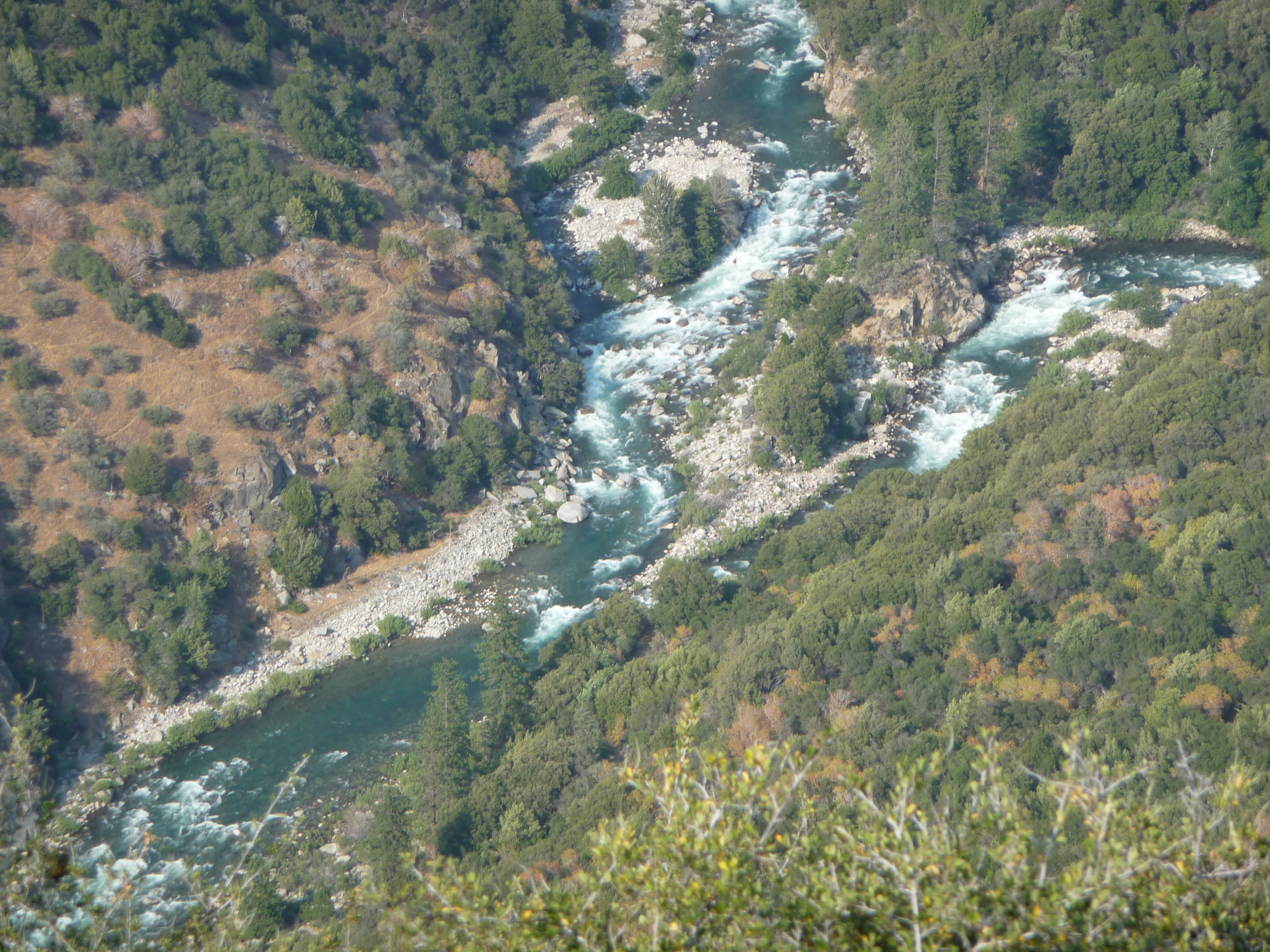
Confluence of middle and south forks of the Kings River

== The Divide is a border ==
The Divide forms the northern border between Sequoia and Kings Canyon National Parks.

== Summits and passes on the Divide ==
Going west to east, Mount Silliman is a prominent summit, as are Elizabeth Peak and Alta Peak, and the Divide terminates at Triple Divide Peak.

Both Elizabeth Pass and Copper Mine Pass are directly on the Divide, as is Silliman Pass.

It also runs along Copper Mine Pass, and is near Cloud Canyon and Upper Big Bird Lake.
