= Benjamin Silliman =

American chemist and science educator (1779–1864)

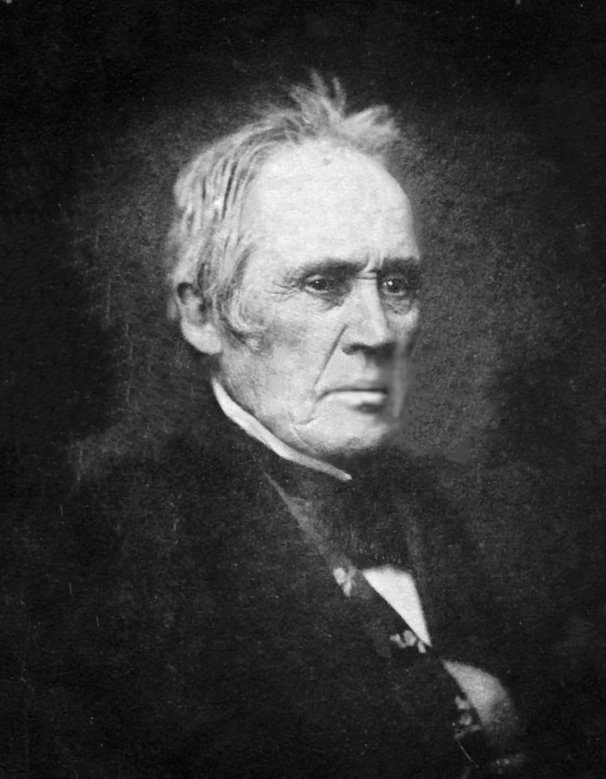
- Silliman around 1850
- Born: August 8, 1779; Trumbull, Connecticut, United States
- Died: November 24, 1864 (aged 85); New Haven, Connecticut, United States
- Education: Yale University; University of Pennsylvania; University of Edinburgh
- Known for: Distillation of petroleum
- Awards: National Academy of Sciences
- Scientific career
- Fields: Chemist
- Workplaces: Yale University
- Doctoral students: James Dwight Dana

Benjamin Silliman (August 8, 1779 – November 24, 1864) was an American chemist and science educator. He was one of the first American professors of science, the first science professor at Yale, and the first person to use the process of fractional distillation in America. He was a founder of the American Journal of Science, which was sometimes referred to as Silliman's Journal during his lifetime, and is the oldest continuously published scientific journal in the United States.

== Early life ==
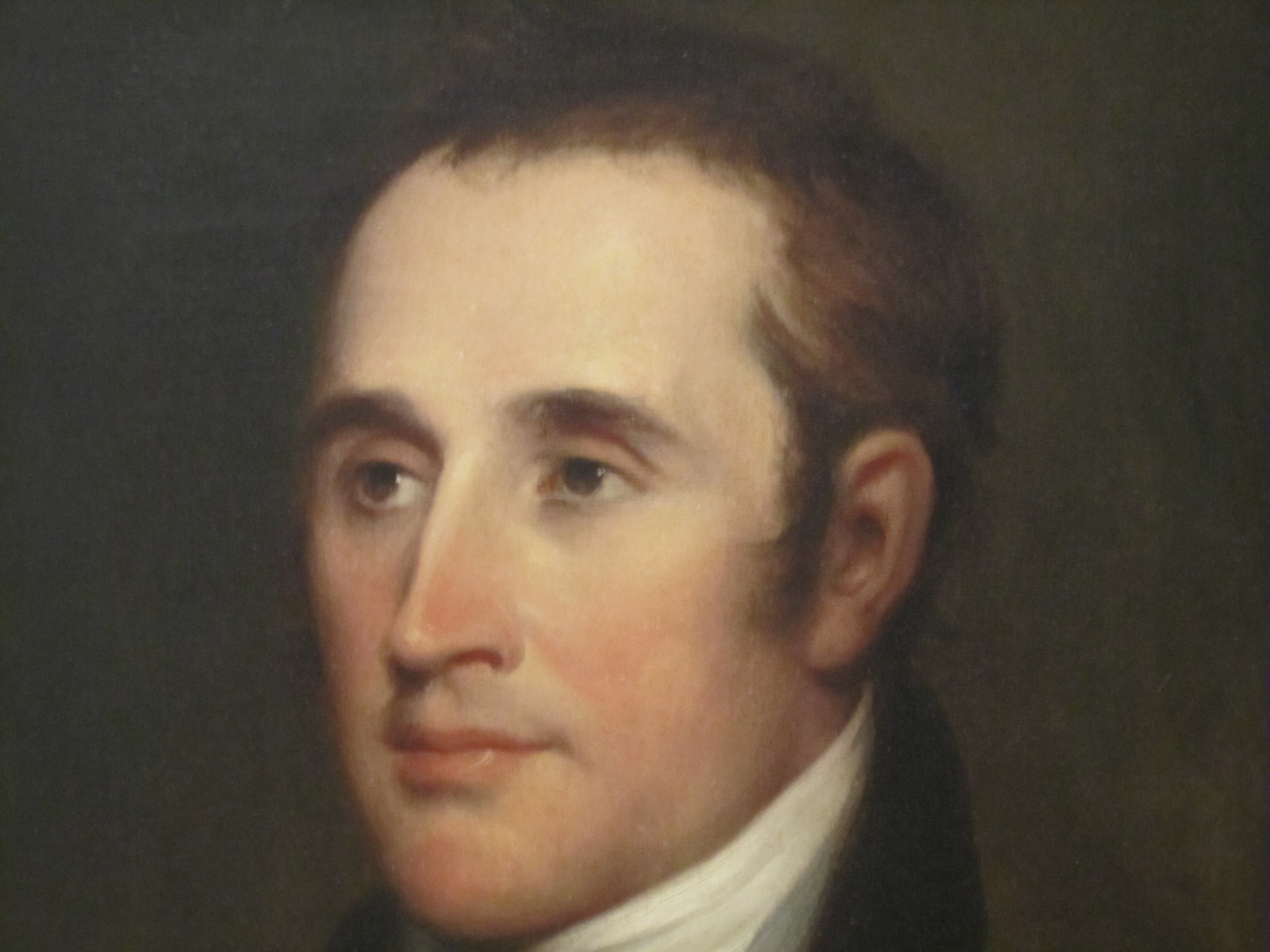
Silliman as he appears at the National Portrait Gallery in Washington, D.C.

Silliman was born in a tavern in North Stratford, now Trumbull, Connecticut, to Mary (Fish) Silliman (widow of John Noyes) and General Gold Selleck Silliman. He was born in August 1779, several months after British forces took his father prisoner and his mother had fled their home in Fairfield, Connecticut, to escape 2,000 British troops who burned Fairfield center to the ground.

Silliman was educated at Yale, receiving a B.A. degree in 1796 and a M.A. in 1799. He studied law with Simeon Baldwin from 1798 to 1799 and became a tutor at Yale from 1799 to 1802. He was admitted to the bar in 1802. That same year he was hired by Yale President Timothy Dwight IV as a professor of chemistry and natural history. Silliman, who had never studied chemistry, prepared for the job by studying chemistry with Professor James Woodhouse at the University of Pennsylvania in Philadelphia. In 1804, he delivered his first lectures in chemistry, which were also the first science lectures ever given at Yale. In 1805, he traveled to University of Edinburgh for further study.

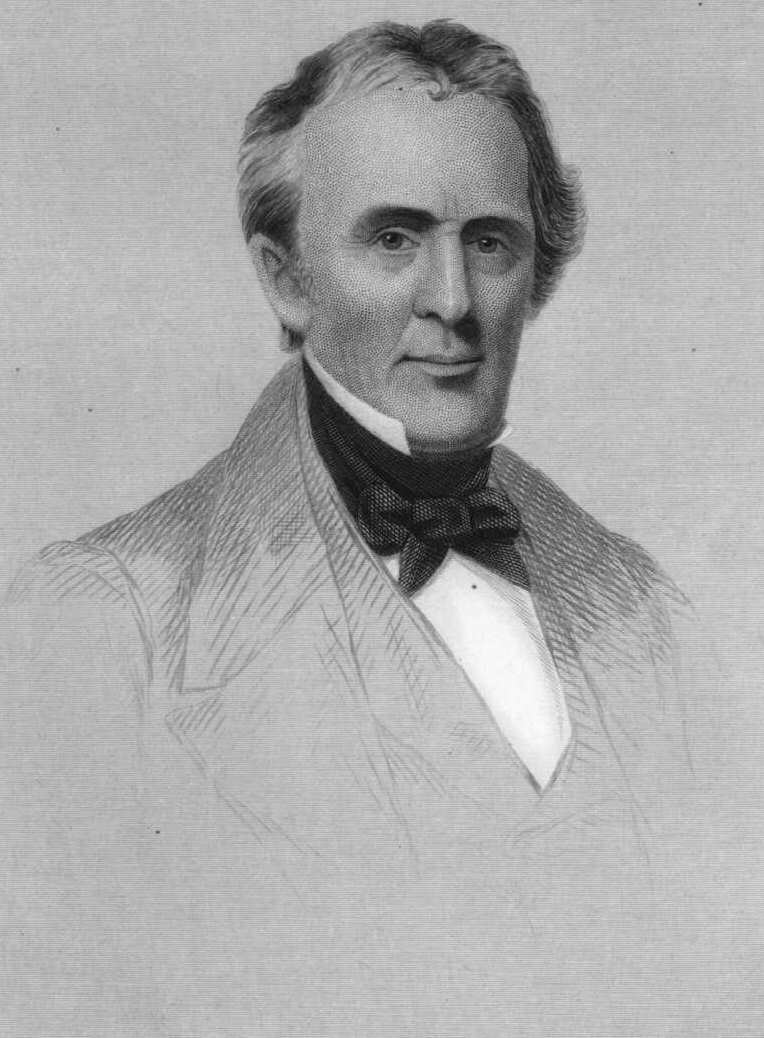
Benjamin Silliman

== Career ==
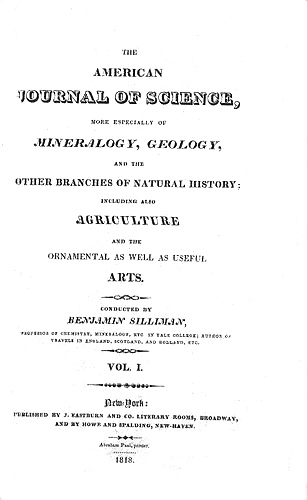
Title page, inaugural edition of the American Journal of Science, founded by Benjamin Silliman, 1818

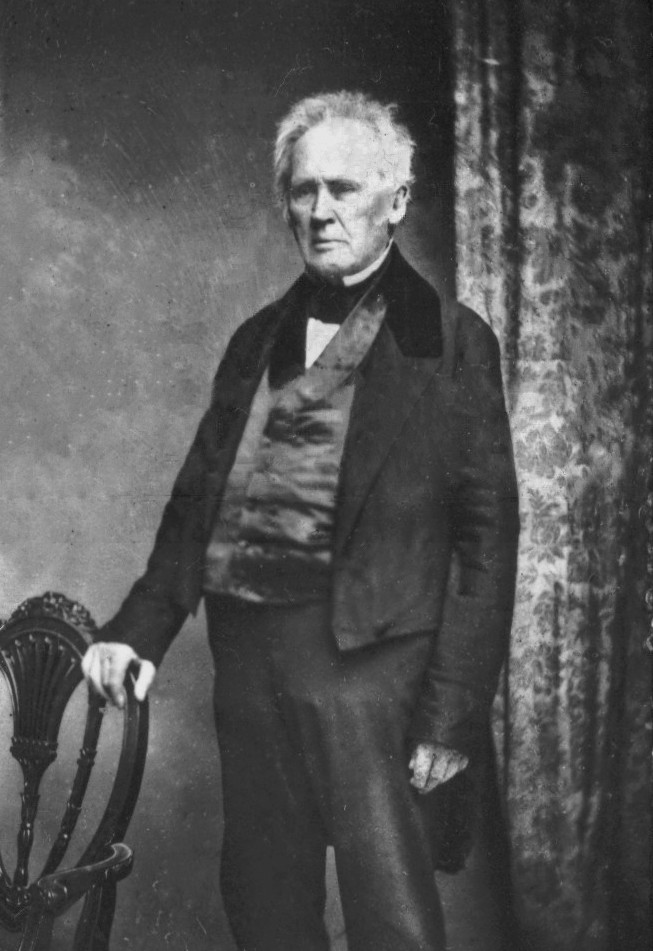
Silliman c. 1860

Returning to New Haven, he studied its geology. His chemical analysis of a meteorite that fell in 1807 near Weston, Connecticut, was the first published scientific account of an American meteorite. He lectured publicly at New Haven in 1808 and came to discover many of the constituent elements of many minerals. Some time around 1818, Ephraim Lane took some samples of rocks he found at an area called Saganawamps, now a part of the Old Mine Park Archeological Site in Trumbull, to Silliman for identification. Silliman reported in his new American Journal of Science, a publication covering all the natural sciences but with an emphasis on geology, that he had identified tungsten, tellurium, topaz and fluorite in the rocks. The American Journal of Science itself was highly influential and was often referred to as "Silliman's Journal." He played a major role in the discoveries of the first articulated fossil fishes found in the United States, which he discovered in Newark Supergroup deposits near Connecticut, and were later described as the genera Redfieldius and Semionotus. In 1837, the first prismatic barite ore of tungsten in the United States was discovered at the mine. The mineral sillimanite was named after Silliman in 1850. Upon the founding of the medical school, he also taught there as one of the founding faculty members.

Silliman was an early supporter of coeducation in the Ivy League. Although Yale would not admit women as students until over 100 years later, he allowed young women into his lecture classes. His efforts convinced Frederick Barnard, later president of Columbia College, that women ought to be admitted as students. "The elder Silliman, during the entire period of his distinguished career as a Professor of Chemistry, Geology and Mineralogy in Yale College, was accustomed every year to admit to his lecture-courses classes of young women from the schools of New Haven. In that institution the undersigned had an opportunity to observe, as a student, the effect of the practice, similar to that which he afterward created for himself in Alabama, as a teacher. The results in both instances, so far as they went, were good; and they went far enough to make it evident that if the presence of young women in college, instead of being occasional, should be constant, they would be better."

American historian David McCullough mentions in his book about early 19th century Americans in Paris that in 1825 Silliman, while on a tour of Europe conferring with other scientists, encountered his former Yale science student Samuel Morse in the Louvre museum (at that time Morse was still primarily a painter). As professor emeritus, he delivered lectures at Yale on geology until 1855; Silliman had been the first person to use the process of fractional distillation, and, in 1854 his son Benjamin Silliman Jr became the first person to fractionate petroleum by distillation. In 1864, Silliman noted oil seeps in the Ojai, California, area. In 1866, this led to the start of oil exploration and development in the Ojai Basin.

Silliman pioneered the mass production of carbonated water and helped popularize it in the United States. In 1806, he purchased a Nooth apparatus and opened a soda fountain in New Haven. He marketed his mineral waters for their medicinal properties.

=== 1807 meteor ===
At 6:30 in the morning of December 14, 1807, a blazing fireball about two-thirds the apparent size of the Moon in the sky, was seen traveling southwards by early risers in Vermont and Massachusetts. Three loud explosions were heard over Weston, Connecticut. Stone fragments fell in at least 6 places. The largest and only unbroken stone, which weighed 36.5 pounds (16.5 kilograms), was found some days after Silliman and Kingsley had spent several fruitless hours hunting for it. The owner, a Trumbull farmer named Elijah Seeley, was urged to present it to Yale by local people who had met the professors during their investigation, but he insisted on putting it up for sale. It was purchased by Colonel George Gibbs for his large and famous collection of minerals; when the collection became the property of Yale in 1825, Silliman finally acquired this stone; the only specimen of the Weston meteorite that remains in the Yale Peabody Museum collection today.

== Religion ==
Like his son-in-law James Dana, Silliman was a Christian. In an address delivered before the Association of American Geologists he spoke in favor of old Earth creationism, stating:

It is already admitted by multitudes, that the chronology of the Scriptures is, in strictness, applied only to the history of our race, the sole moral beings whom God has placed in this World; while all that precedes man in the creation, is limited, in duration backwards, only by that beginning, whose date is known to no being but the infinite Creator, and which certainly precedes, by many ages, the creation of man.

— Silliman, (1842)

In the same line of thought, he posed arguments against atheism and materialism. Silliman repeatedly tried to convert his lifelong friend and fellow chemist Robert Hare away from spiritualism, sending him a book which Silliman believed was a "scientific vindication" of Christianity, and which he hoped showed the "copious evidence which supports the divine origin of the Scriptures."

In 1833 he discussed the relationship of Flood geology to the Genesis account and also wrote about this topic in 1840.

== Personal life ==
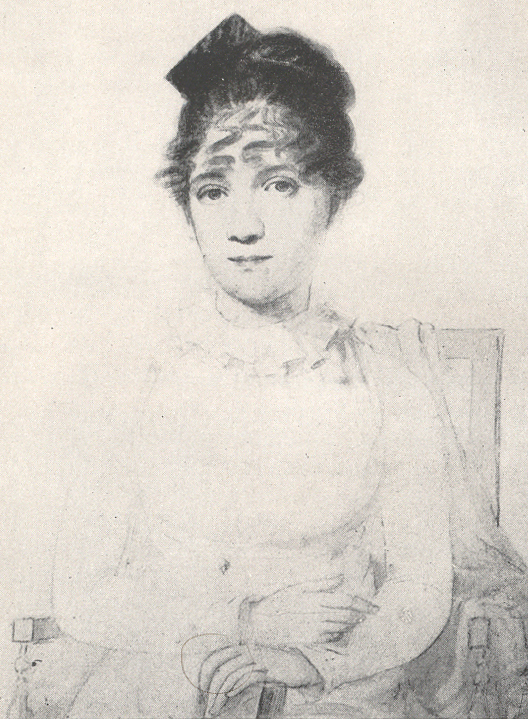
Portrait of Harriett Trumbull from a crayon sketch by her uncle John Trumbull, Yale University Art Gallery

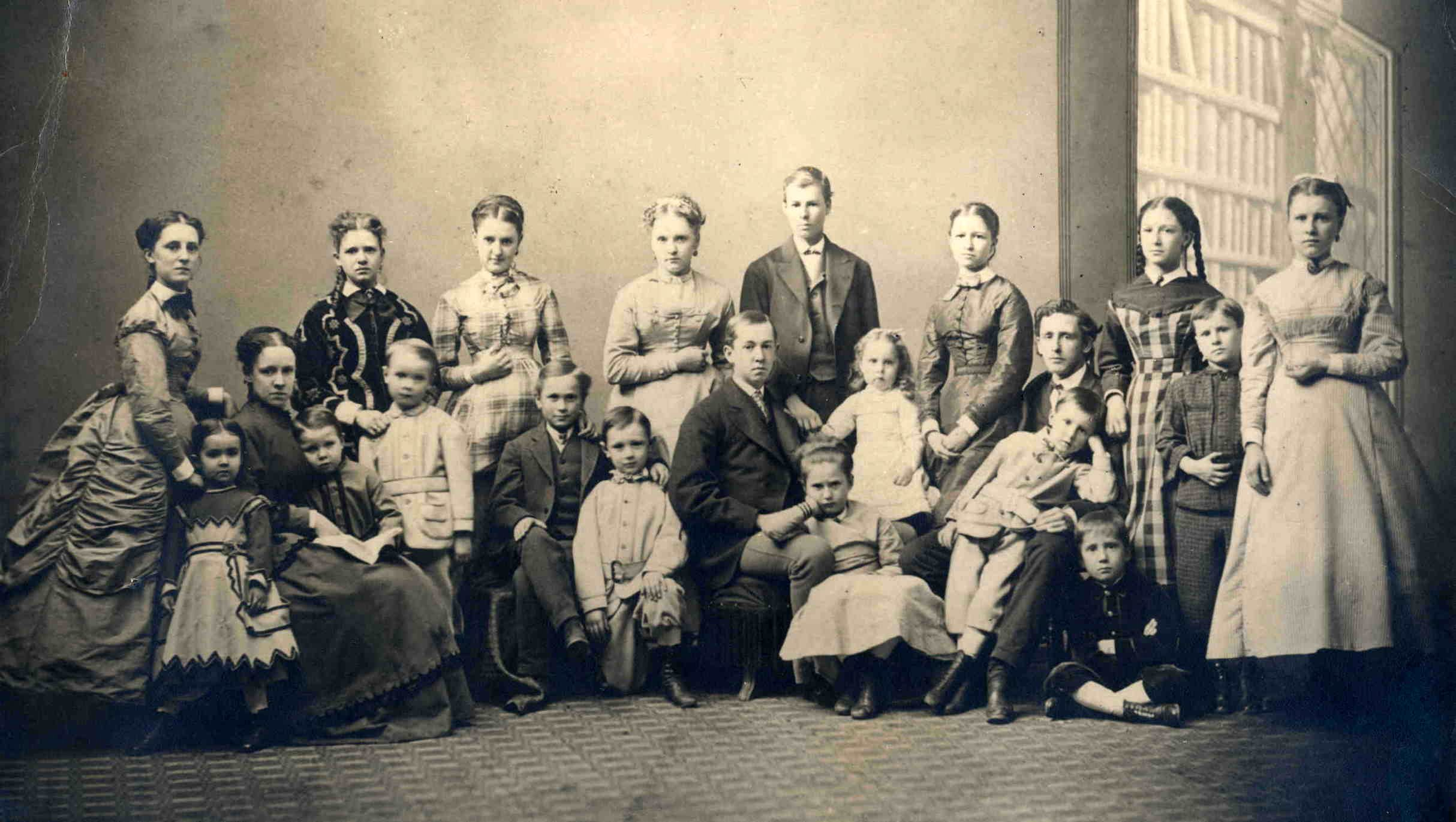
Silliman with his extended family

His first marriage was on September 17, 1809, to Harriet Trumbull, (Note: Trumbull and her sister Maria Trumbull spent the winter of 1800 and spring of 1801 in New York City where they came out to New York society. The teenaged girls stayed at the home of Lady Kitty Duer. Friends of their parents made plans for the girls' lessons and social activities. They had music, dancing, and drawing lessons. Their letters to their parents provided insight into their lives of lessons, parties, plays, and more. The letters were published in the book A season in New York, 1801. The book provides insight into the inner thoughts of 19th-century girls as they experienced life in a big city.) daughter of Connecticut Governor Jonathan Trumbull Jr. Silliman and his wife had four children: one daughter married Professor Oliver P. Hubbard, another, Henrietta Frances, married Professor James Dwight Dana (Silliman's doctoral student until 1833 and assistant from 1836 to 1837); and youngest daughter Julia married Edward Whiting Gilman, brother of Yale graduate and educator Daniel Coit Gilman. His son Benjamin Silliman Jr., also a professor of chemistry at Yale, wrote a report that convinced investors to back George Bissell's seminal search for oil. His second marriage was in 1851 to Mrs. Sarah Isabella (McClellan) Webb, daughter of John McClellan. Silliman died at New Haven in 1864 and is buried in Grove Street Cemetery.

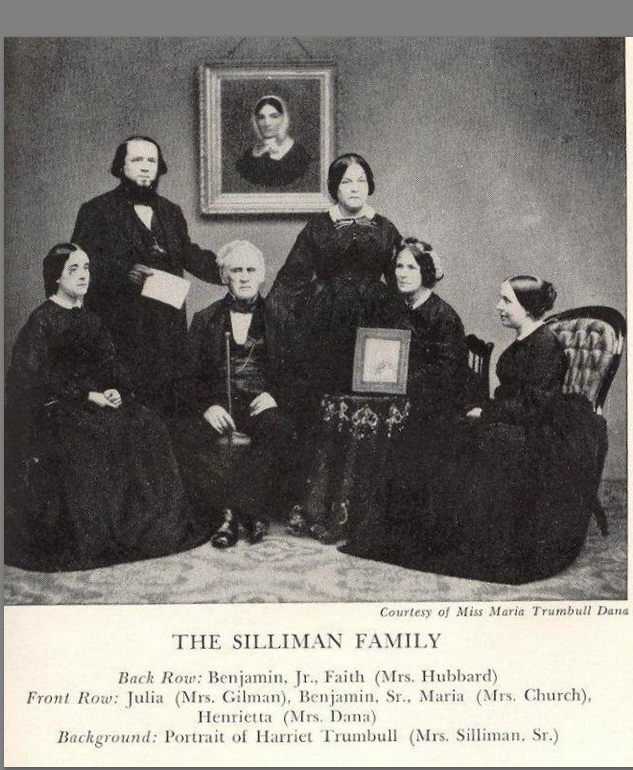
Photo of the Benjamin Silliman family with portrait of his deceased wife Harriet Trumbull on wall

== Legacy ==
Silliman deemed slavery an "enormous evil". According to Yale historian David Blight, Silliman received a research assignment in 1833 to study the sugar plantations of Louisiana. Despite his aversion to slavery, he was nevertheless influenced by the hypocrisy that reigned at the time on the issue, understandable when one considers that most of the college's founders, faculty, and administrators, including himself, were slave owners. He told a colleague who was about to leave on a study mission: "Open your eyes and ears to every fact connected with the actual condition of slavery everywhere – but do not talk about it – hear and see everything but say little". He favored colonization of free African Americans in Liberia, serving as a board member of the Connecticut Colonization Society between 1828 and 1835. He was elected a member of the American Antiquarian Society in 1813, and an Associate Fellow of the American Academy of Arts and Sciences in 1815. Silliman founded and edited the American Journal of Science, and was appointed one of the corporate members of the National Academy of Sciences by the United States Congress. He was also a member of the American Association for the Advancement of Science.

Silliman College, one of Yale's residential colleges, is named for him, as is the mineral Sillimanite. In Sequoia National Park, Mount Silliman is named for him, as is Silliman Pass, a creek and two lakes below the summit of Mount Silliman.

The standard author abbreviation Silliman is used to indicate this person as the author when citing a botanical name.

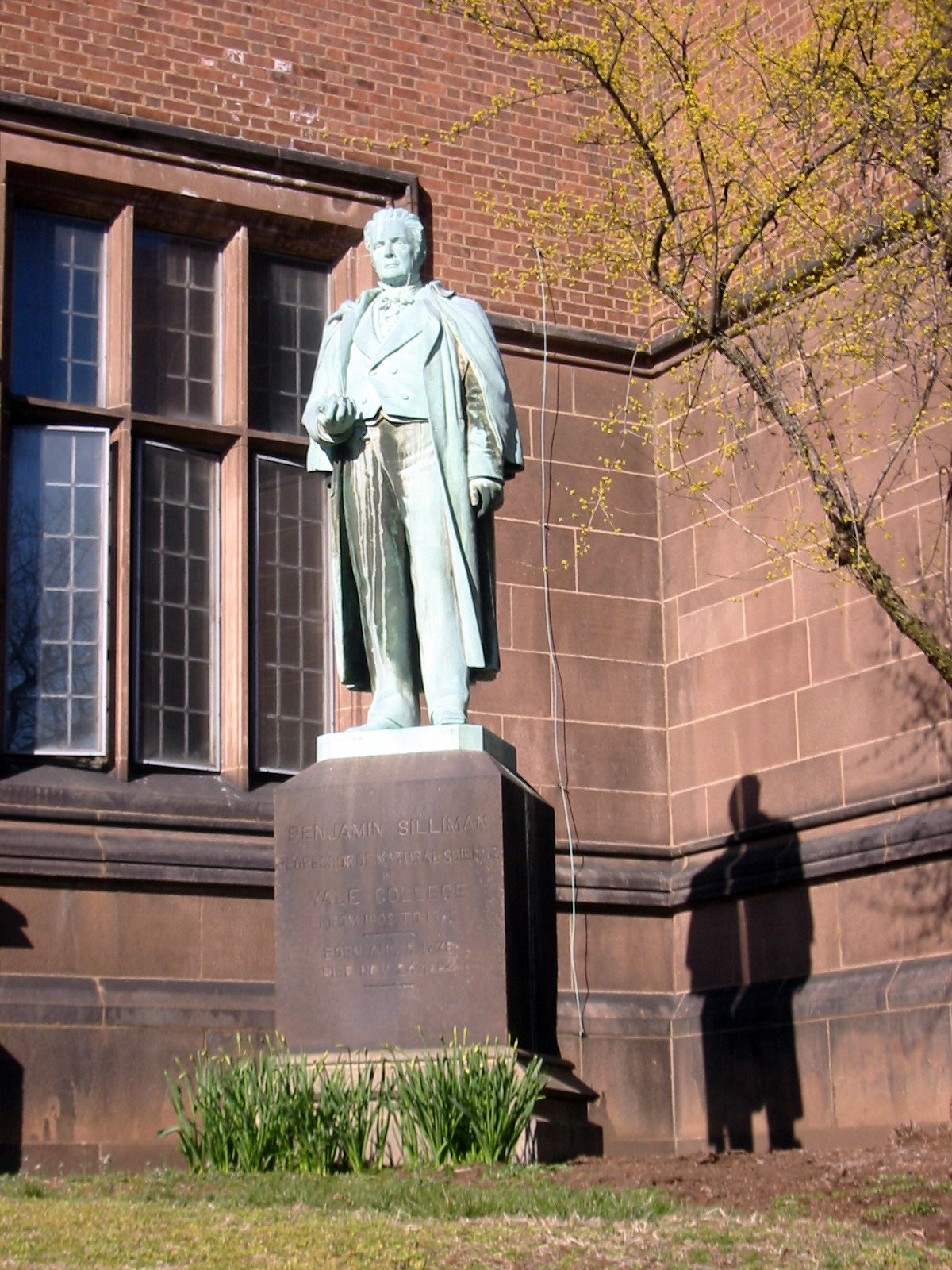
A statue of Silliman in front of Yale's Sterling Chemistry Laboratory

== See also ==
- Connecticut Academy of Arts and Sciences
- Petroleum
