= Silliman Memorial Lectures =

Yale University lecture series

The Silliman Memorial lectures series has been published by Yale University since 1901. The lectures were established by the university on the foundation of a bequest of $80,000, left in 1883 by Augustus Ely Silliman, in memory of his mother, Mrs. Hepsa Ely Silliman. Hepsa Ely was the daughter of the Reverend David Ely, a member of the Yale College Class of 1769. She was married to Gold Selleck Silliman, brother of Professor Benjamin Silliman and a 1796 graduate of Yale College. She was the mother of two sons, August Ely Silliman and Benjamin Douglas Silliman. Benjamin graduated from Yale College in 1824.

The lectures are designed to illustrate the presence and providence, the wisdom and goodness of God, as manifested in the natural and moral world. The testator's belief was that any orderly presentation of the facts of nature or history contributed to the foundation's purpose more effectively than any attempt to emphasize the elements of doctrine or creed; and he therefore provided that lectures on dogmatic or polemical theology should be excluded from its scope, and that instead the subjects should be selected from the domains of natural science and history, with special prominence given to astronomy, chemistry, geology, and anatomy.

== Lecturers (partial list) ==
- 1902-03 Thomson, Joseph John - Electricity and Matter (1904)
- 1903-04 Sherrington, Charles Scott - The Integrative Action of the Nervous System (1906)
- 1904-05 Rutherford, Ernest - Radioactive Transformations (1906)
- 1905-06 No Lecture
- 1906-07 Nernst, Walter - Experimental and Theoretical Applications of Thermodynamics to Chemistry (1911, republished 1913)
- 1907-08 Bateson, William - Problems of Genetics (1913)
- 1908-09 Penck, Albrecht
- 1909-10 Campbell, William Wallace - Stellar Motions (1913)
- 1910-11 Arrhenius, Svante August - Theories of Solutions (1912)
- 1911-12 Verworn, Max - Irritability (1908)
- 1912-13 Osler, William - The Evolution of Modern Medicine (1921)
- 1913-14 Iddings, Joseph Paxson et al. - The Problem of Volcanism (1914)
- 1913-14 Lindgren, Waldemar et al. - Problems of American Geology (1915)
- 1915-16 No Lecture
- 1916-17 Haldane, John Scott - Organism and Environment as Illustrated by the Physiology of Breathing Respiration (1917)
- 1917-18 Dana, Barrell et al. - A Century of Science in America (Dana Commemorative Lectures) (1922)
- 1918-19 No Lecture
- 1919-20 Hadamard, Jacques Solomon - Lecture on Cauchy's Problem in Linear Partial Differential Equations (1923)
- 1920-21 Cumont, Franz - After Life in Roman Paganism (1922)
- 1920-21 Rettger, Leo Frederick - A Treatise on the Transformation of the Intestinal Flora with Special Reference to the Implantation of Bacillus Acidophillus (1921)
- 1921-22 Pirquet, Clemens - An Outline of the Pirquet System of Nutrition (1922)
- 1922-23 Krogh, August - The Anatomy and Physiology of Capillaries (1922, rev. ed. 1927)
- 1923-24 Bohr, Niels
- 1924-25 Morgan, Thomas Hunt - The Theory of the Gene (1926)
- 1925-26 Lewis, Gilbert Newton - The Anatomy of Science (1926)
- 1926-27 Andrews, Ernest Clayton
- 1927-28 Henderson, Lawrence Joseph - Blood: A Study in General Physiology (1928)
- 1928-30 No Lecture
- 1930-31 Wieland, Heinrich Otto - On the Mechanism of Oxidation (1932)
- 1931-32 Richardson, Owen Willans - Molecular Hydrogen and its Spectrum (1934)
- 1932-33 No Lecture
- 1933-34 Daly, Reginald Aldworth - The Changing World of the Ice Age (1934)
- 1934-35 Spemann, Hans - Induction (1938)
- 1935-36 Hubble, Edwin Powell - The Realm of the Nebulae (1936, repub. 1982)
- 1936-37 Watson, David M. Seares - Paleontology and Modern Biology (1951)
- 1937-38 No Lecture
- 1938-39 Chibnall, Albert Charles - Protein Metabolism in the Plant (1939)
- 1939-40 Goldschmidt, Richard B. - The Material Basis of Evolution (1940, repub. 1982)
- 1940-45 No Lecture
- 1945-46 Lawrence, Ernest; Pauling, Linus; Beadle, George; Stanley, Wendell - The Centennial of the Sheffield Scientific School (George Alfred Baitsell ed.) (1950)
- 1946-47 Cohn, Edwin Joseph
- 1947-48 Beadle, George Wells
- 1948-49 Harrison, Ross Granville - Organization and Development of the Embryo (1969, edited by Sally Widens)
- 1949-50 Fermi, Enrico - Elementary Particles (1951, paper 1961)
- 1950-51 Urey, Harold Clayton - The Planets: Their Origin and Development (1952, paper 1961)
- 1951-52 Pettersson, Hans - The Ocean Floor (1954)
- 1952-53 Cori, Carl Ferdinand; Dunning, John Ray; Suits, Chauncey Guy
- 1953-54 Granit, Ragner - Receptors and Sensory Perception (1955)
- 1954-55 Spence, Kenneth Wartenbe - Behavior Theory and Conditioning (1956)
- 1955-56 von Neumann, John - The Computer and the Brain (1958, paper 1979)
- 1956-57 Seaborg, Glenn Theodore The Transuranium Elements (1958)
- 1957-58 No Lecture
- 1958-59 Dobzhansky, Theodosius - Mankind Evolving (1962)
- 1959-60 Rubey, William Walden
- 1960-61 Dubos, Rene Jules - Man Adapting (1965, paper 1967, enlarged ed. c & p 1990)
- 1961-62 No Lecture
- 1962-63 Chandrasekhar, Subrahmanyan - Ellipsoidal Figures of Equilibrium (1969)
- 1963-64 Leakey, Louis S.B.; Todd, Sir Alexander
- 1964-65 Mulliken, Robert Sanderson
- 1965-66 Rushton, William Albert Hugh
- 1966-67 Wilkinson, Denys Haigh
- 1966-67 Lectures on the Centennial of the Peabody Museum - Evolution and Environment (Ellen Drake, ed) (1968)
- 1967-68 Bronowski, Jacob - On the Origins of Knowledge and Imagination (1979)
- 1968-69 Lederberg, Joshua
- 1969-70 Bishop, et al. The Late Cenozoic Glacial Ages (1971, ed. K.K. Turekian)
- 1970-74 No Lecture
- 1974-75 Kuffler, Stephen
- 1975-76 Jacob, François
- 1976-77 Cox, Allen
- 1977-78 Weinberg, Steven
- 1977-78 Spitzer, Lyman - Searching Between the Stars (1982)
- 1978-79 Kornberg, Arthur
- 1979-80 McLaren, Anne - Germ Cells and Soma: A New Look at an Old Problem (1981)
- 1980-81 Hoffmann, Roald; Gajdusek, D. Carleton
- 1981-82 Wetherill, George
- 1982-83 Pilbeam, David
- 1983-84 Thorne, Kip - Black Holes: The Membrane Paradigm (with Richard Price and Douglas Macdonald) (1986)
- 1984-85 Klug, Aaron
- 1985-86 Corey, E.J.
- 1986-87 Kandel, Eric R.
- 1987-89 No Lecture
- 1989-90 Nüsslein-Volhard, Christiane
- 1989-90 Gel'fand, Israïl Moyseyovich
- 1990-92 No Lecture
- 1992-93 Bromley, David Allan
- 1993-94 No Lecture
- 1994-95 Peebles, Philip J. E. - Cosmogony: How did Galaxies Form?; Mass Puzzles and the Past and Future of Our Expanding Universe
- 1995-96 Hopfield, John J. - Neural Networks: Brains and Computers
- 1996-97 Shoemaker, Eugene - Near-Earth Asteroids and Comets"
- 1997-98 No Lecture
- 1998-99 Pierre-Gilles de Gennes - From Rice to Snow: Problems of Granular Matter
- 1998-99 Karplus, Martin - Proteins: The Fourth Dimension
- 1999-01 No Lecture
- 2001-02 Leakey, Meave - African Origins -Sole Survivors of a Diverse Past
- 2001-02 Allman, John - Evolving Brains
- 2001-02 Cavalli-Storza, Luigi - Genes, Peoples and Languages
- 2001-02 Cech, Thomas - The RNA World and the Origins of Life - Life Before Yale (Long Before)
- 2001-02 Schopf, J William - Discovery of Earth's Earliest Fossils - Solutions to Darwin's Dilemma
- 2001-02 Wasserburg, G.J. - From Small Rocks to Big Stars and the Early Universe - a Study of Cosmochemical Immodesty
- 2002-03 Anderson, James G. - Chemistry and the Earth: Bridging Electronic Structure and Climate; The Nature of the Chemical Bond in Transition: Prediction of Barrier Heights; Coupling of Chemistry and Climate: Eocene, Present and Future
- 2003-12 No Lecture
- 2012-13 Faber, Sandra - Genesis: The Modern Story
- 2013-14 Banaji, Mahzarin - Group Love
- 2014-15 McKenzie, Dan - Plates and Earthquakes: Why We Expect a Million Deaths this Century
- 2016-17 Alley, Richard B - Sea-Level Rise: Inconvenient, or Unmanageable?
- 2017-18 Richards-Kortum, Rebecca - Essential Solutions and Technologies to Eliminate Preventable Newborn Death in Africa
- 2018-19 Reich, David - Who We Are and How We Got Here; Ancient DNA and the New Science of the Human Past
- 2019-20 No Lecture
- 2022-23 James Hudspeth - "The Physics and Physiology of Hearing: How the Ear's Works Works"
- 2023-24 Elaine Fuchs - "Our Body's Stem Cells: How They Cope with Stress and Learn from Their Experiences"
- 2024-25 Cori Bargmannn - "One Brain, Many Behaviors: The Fascinating World of Internal States"
- 2024-25 Wendy Freeman - "Testing Models of Our Universe with the James Webb Space Telescope"

The year given is sometimes that of the publication of the book, rather than that in which the lectures were given.

== See also ==
- Dwight H. Terry Lectureship
