= Greenfield Hill Historic District =

Historic district in Connecticut, United States

- U.S. National Register of Historic Places
- U.S. Historic district
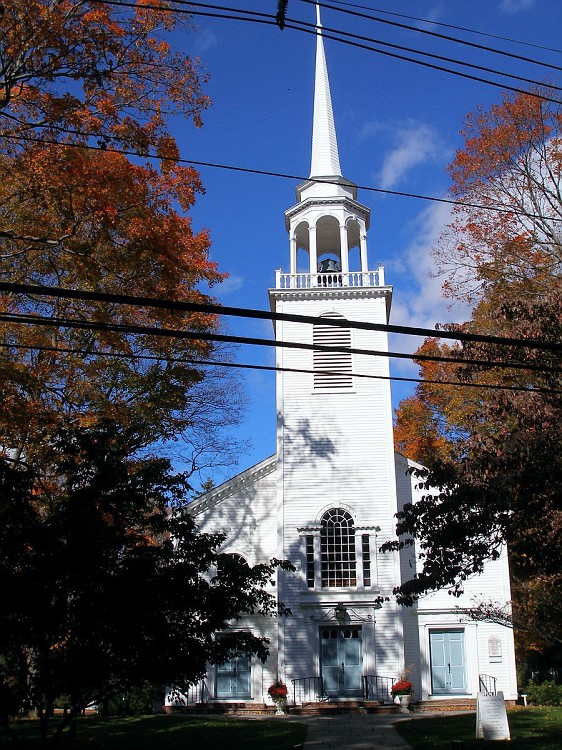
- Greenfield Hill Congregational Church

- Location within Connecticut Location within the United States
- Location: Roughly bounded by the Merritt Parkway, Burr Street, Redding Road, Hulls Farm Road and Hill Farm Road, Greenfield Hill, Connecticut
- Coordinates: 41°10′25″N 73°17′28″W
- Area: 175 acres (71 ha)
- Built: 1750
- NRHP reference No.: 71000899
- Added to NRHP: March 11, 1971

The Greenfield Hill Historic District encompasses the historic village area of the village of Greenfield Hill in northern Fairfield, Connecticut. The area was important from the mid-18th to 19th centuries as an intellectual center in the town, driven in part by Timothy Dwight, the Greenfield Hill Church minister and later president of Yale College. The district features a variety of architectural styles from the 18th to mid-19th century. It was listed on the U.S. National Register of Historic Places in 1971.

== Description and history ==
Greenfield Hill is a suburban residential area in central northern Fairfield, centered on the triangular Greenfield Hill green bounded by Hillside Road, Old Academy Road, and Bronson Road. It includes 38 principal houses or structures and 20 secondary structures, and a windmill. The district includes small streets around the Greenfield Hill Green but has a highly irregular shape extending south. It is drawn to include older, historic homes and to exclude newer, less-historic properties to the north of the green and around the listed area.

The area became important in the late 18th century when Timothy Dwight became minister of the Greenfield Hill Congregational Church in 1783. Dwight also established an academy (now the site of Timothy Dwight Park) at which both young men and women were educated in the classics. The school drew visiting scholars and luminaries, including Abraham Baldwin, a drafter of the United States Constitution and founder of the University of Georgia, and poet and diplomat Joel Barlow.

The district, along with Southport Historic District and Fairfield Historic District is somewhat governed by Fairfield's Historic District Commission.

Significant properties in the district include:

- Timothy Dwight Park, site of a historic academy founded by Timothy Dwight
- 1650 Meetinghouse Lane, originally a saltbox home from c. 1750 that was later remodeled extensively. Associated with Abraham Baldwin and with Joel Barlow
- Old Cemetery, on Bronson Road
- 105 Meetinghouse Lane, owned by Zalmon Bradley
- Greenfield Hill Congregational Church
- "Old Salt Box at 1081 Hillside", a saltbox structure that was a shop, a home, and in which the academy was started
- 3244 Bronson Road
- 3171 Bronson Road, gambrel-roofed
- 2829 Bronson Road, which served during 1901-15 as clubhouse of Greenfield Hill Country Club, but which also is associated with agriculture shows, including one showing 52 oxen in 1906, that illustrated agricultural basis of the area
- 55 Meetinghouse Lane
- 3105 Bronson Road, the Bronson Windmill, separate listed on the National Register

== See also ==
- Greenfield Hill Grange No. 133, a separately NRHP-listed property also in Greenfield Hill but outside the district
- National Register of Historic Places listings in Fairfield County, Connecticut
