= Southport Historic District (Fairfield, Connecticut) =

Historic district in Connecticut, United States

- U.S. National Register of Historic Places
- U.S. Historic district
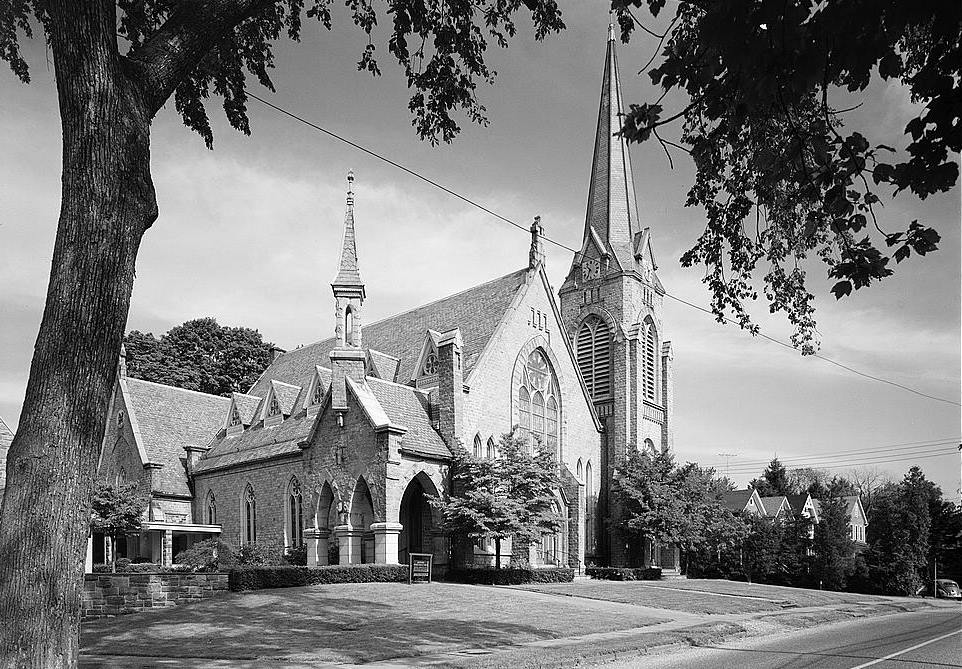
- Southport Congregational Church, 1966

- Location within Connecticut Location within the United States
- Location: Roughly bounded by Southport Harbor, Railroad, Old South Road and Rose Hill Road, Fairfield, Connecticut
- Coordinates: 41°7′55″N 73°17′4″W
- Area: 225 acres (91 ha)
- Built: 1800
- Architectural style: Greek Revival, Romanesque, Federal
- NRHP reference No.: 71000898
- Added to NRHP: March 24, 1971

The Southport Historic District in the town of Fairfield, Connecticut is a 225-acre (91 ha) area historic district that was listed on the National Register of Historic Places in 1971. It preserves a portion of the modern neighborhood and former borough of Southport, Connecticut. Since the British burnt almost all of Southport's structures in 1779, there is only one home built prior to that date, the Meeker House at 824 Harbor Road, which survives.

== Description ==
The area of the district is bounded on the north by the Metro-North railroad tracks, on the south by the Mill River and Southport Harbor, on the west by Old South Road, and on the east by Rose Hill Road. It includes additional properties on both sides of Old South Road and Rose Hill Road, but excludes the commercial and industrial properties along Pequot Avenue inside the so-defined area. This is about a quarter of the former borough area of Southport, which ran from Mill River to Sasco Creek, and from the Southport Harbor to Mill Hill.

A local commission enforces preservation rules in the district (and also in two other historic districts in the town of Fairfield). Alterations to properties in the district have to be approved. A case where a Greek Revival mansion owner placed a large sculpture on the grounds went all the way to the U.S. supreme court in 2007. The Supreme Court ruled in favor of the commission, that the sculpture qualified as a structure and required commission approval. It was the Historic District Commission of Fairfield. More here. The 80 foot, six ton sculpture by German artist Anselm Kiefer, titled "Narrow as the Vessels", was donated to a museum, and the owner put even more striking (although lighter) sculptures on the lawn instead.

In 1970, the NRHP nomination for the district argued it was "significant because it has been the center of trade and commerce in Fairfield and because its history is typical of the development of commercial life in many New England ports in the fifty years following the revolutionary war. The architecture of the district consists primarily of buildings constructed after 1779 when the British virtually destroyed Fairfield. It is a valuable concentration of Greek Revival and Victorian structures which were for the most part the homes of substantial men whose wealth came from their involvement in commerce, banking, and shipping."

It includes more than 150 contributing buildings. The more significant ones include:

- 750 Harbour Road, the house of Oliver Perry, a significant figure (but not the more famous Oliver Hazard Perry), a Greek Revival house with a pediment above four Doric columns;
- 780 Harbor Road, house of Walter Perry III, a Federal style house built in 1830
- 712 Harbor Road, a Greek Revival house with Corinthian columns
- 478 Harbor Road, built in 1831
- 72 Willow Street, childhood home of Joseph Sheffield, founder of the Rock Island Railroad
- 104 Old South Road, home of Paschal Sheffield, a privateer for Argentina during its war for independence from Spain
- 824 Harbor Road, Meeker House, built prior to 1766, only structure that is known to have survived the British burning of Southport in 1779
- 25 Westway Road, built in 1856, has gingerbread trim
- 95 Westway Road, built in 1840
- 564 Harbor Road, built in 1835 by a shipowner and captain, Charles C. Perry, built in a Greek Revival style which was later altered but then restored in 1926
- "The Bulkeley Houses", at 14 Willow Street, 104 Main Street, 142 Main Street, 114 Westway Road, 892 Harbor Road
- 187 Westway Road, built as a saltbox for Dimon prior to 1818, since enlarged and altered. It has the "Dimon Oak", known to be at least 260 years old in 1970, which stood nearly 100 feet tall and measured 19.5 feet in circumference
- 95 Main Street, built c. 1827, which served as a school, a place of worship, and as a town hall. The building, now a residence, at some point after 1854 was moved closer to Main Street and was altered.
- 450 Harbor Road
- the "Nichols Houses", at 155 Rose Hill Road, 494 Harbor Road, 534 Harbor Road
- three Victorian era houses at 658 Pequot Road, 418 Harbor Road, 385 Harbor Road
- 798 Harbor Road, now a house, the main part of which was a store in the 1850s. In 1894 it was the "Bachelor's Comfort, and Married Men's Relief" club, during World War I it was a British War Relief something, and later it was the first clubhouse for the Pequot Yacht Club.
- Tide Mill Building, at 95 Harbor Road
- 668-670 Harbor Road
- 62 Center Street, a Greek Revival house

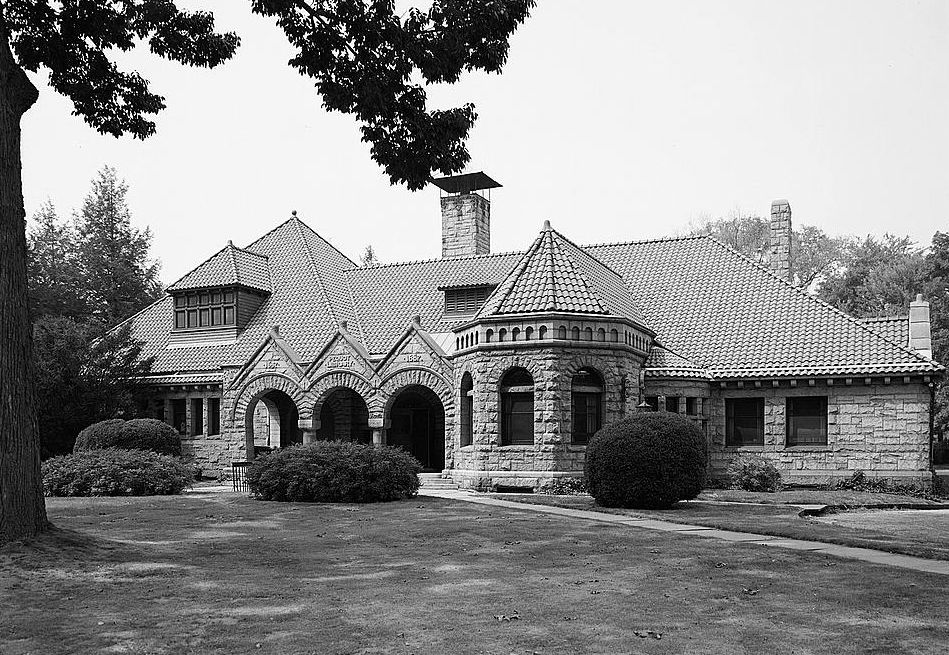
Pequot Library, HABS-photographed in 1966

- Pequot Library, at 720 Pequot Avenue

== Harbor Road ==
Harbor Road runs along the harbor and all of it is included in the district

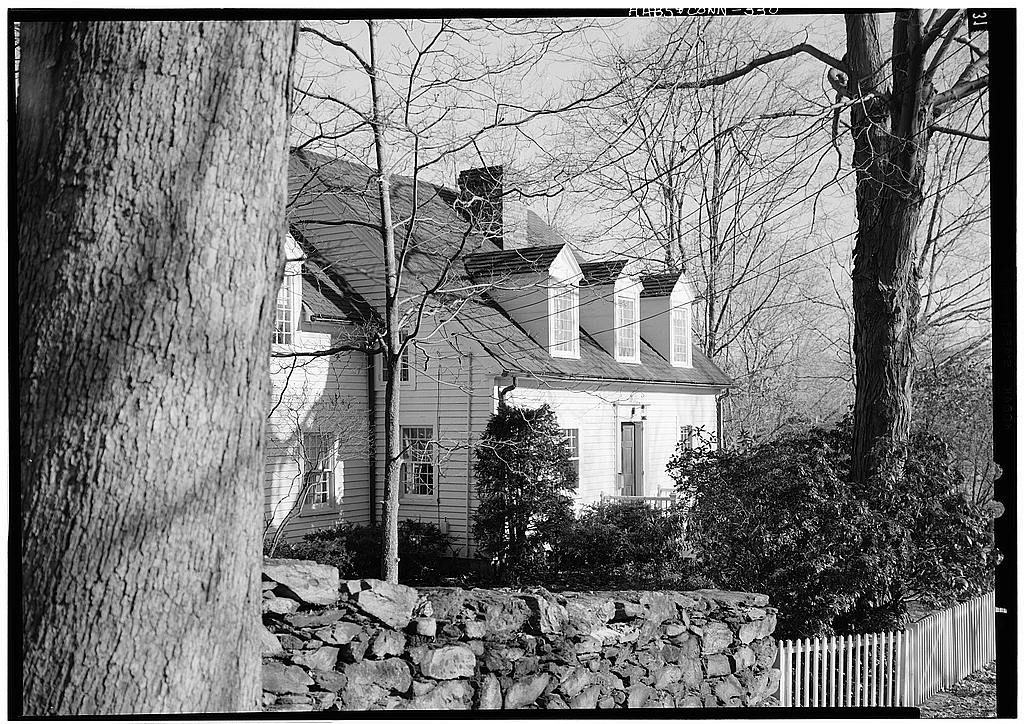
Captain Ward Bulkley House, 298 Harbor Road

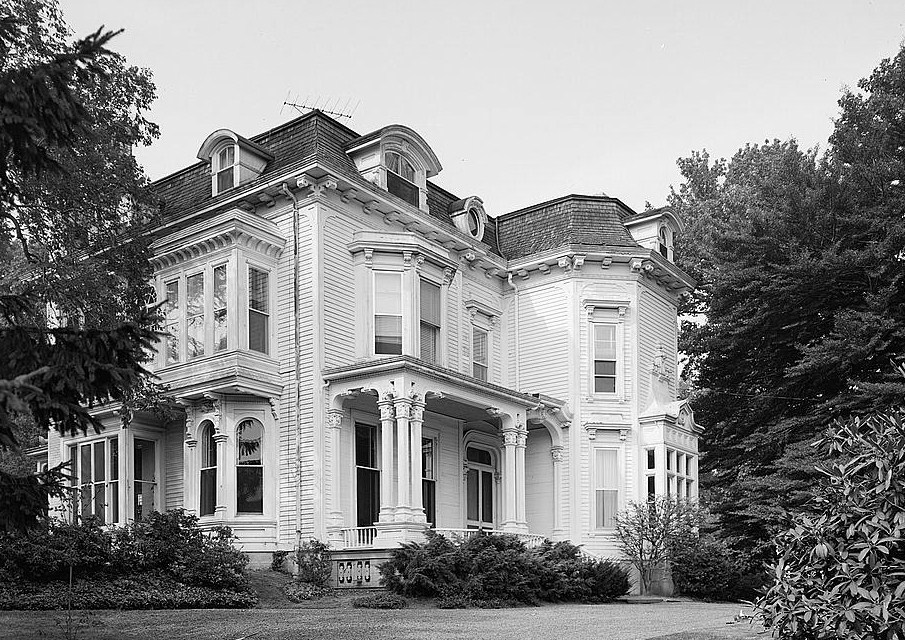
Zalmon Wakeman House, 418 Harbor Road

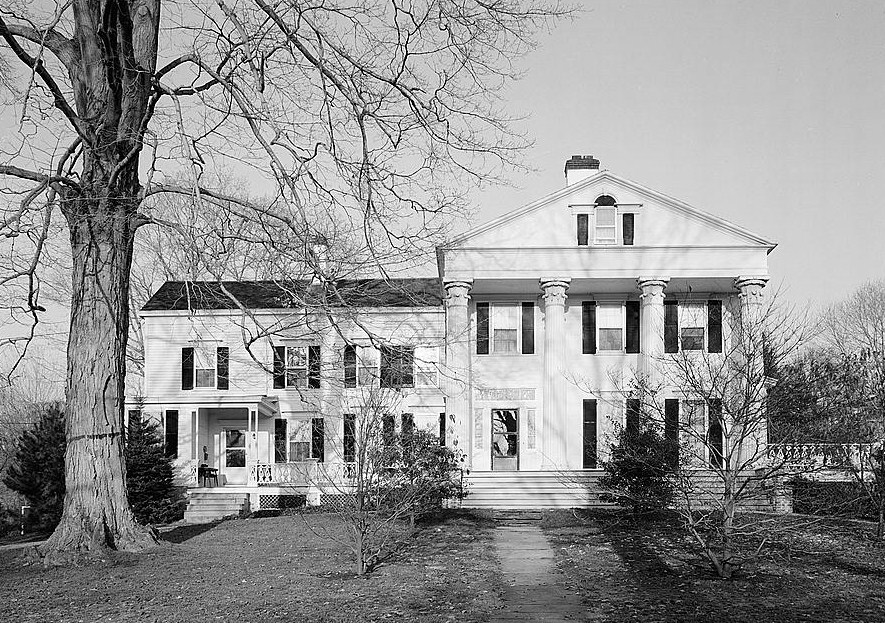
Captain William Webb House, 478 Harbor Road

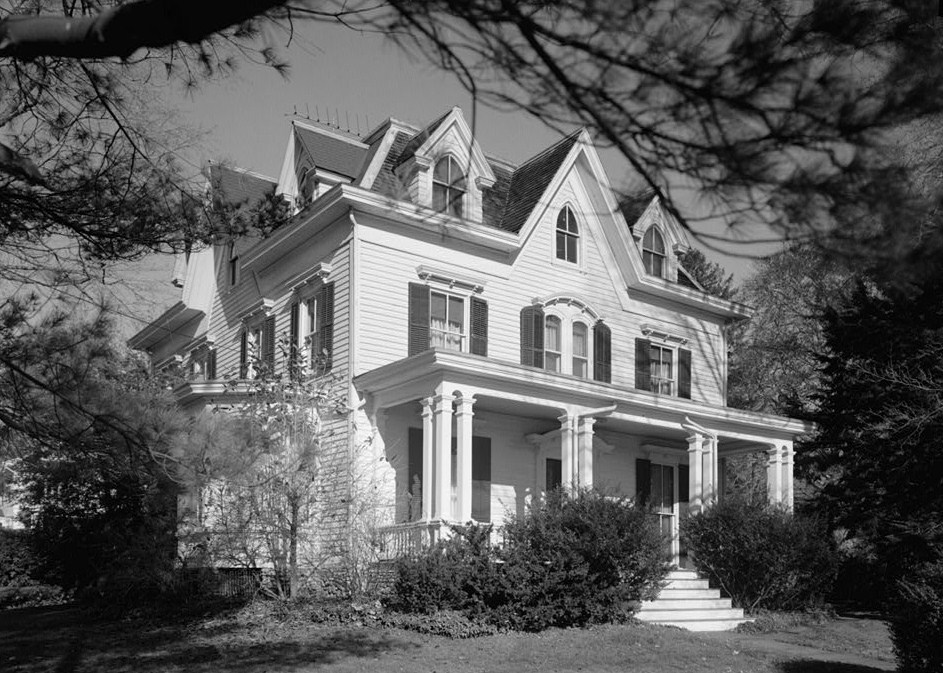
Allen Nichols House, 494 Harbor Road

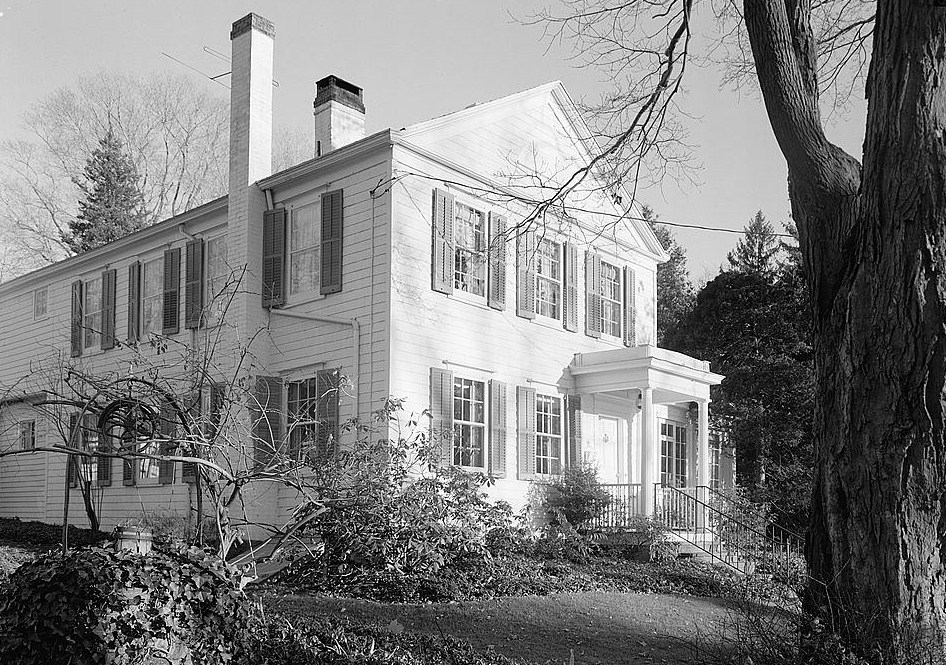
Barnabas Sturges House, 534 Harbor Road

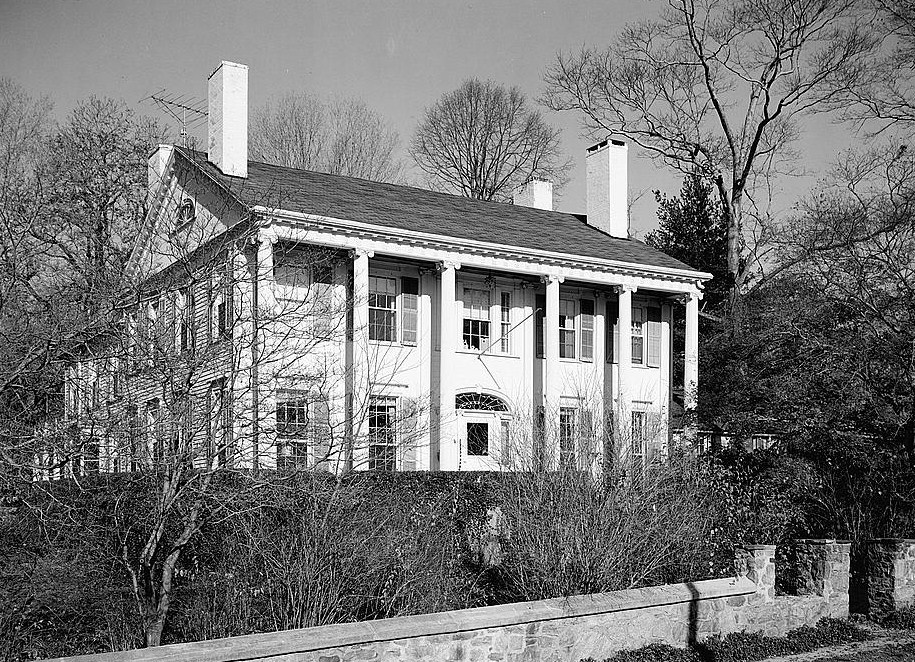
Charles Perry House, 564 Harbor Road

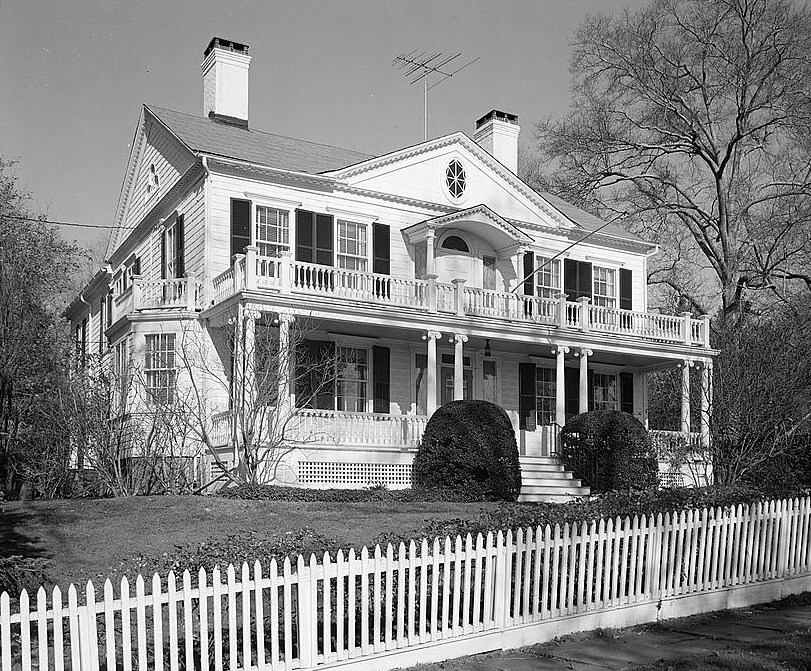
Henry Sturges House, 608 Harbor Road

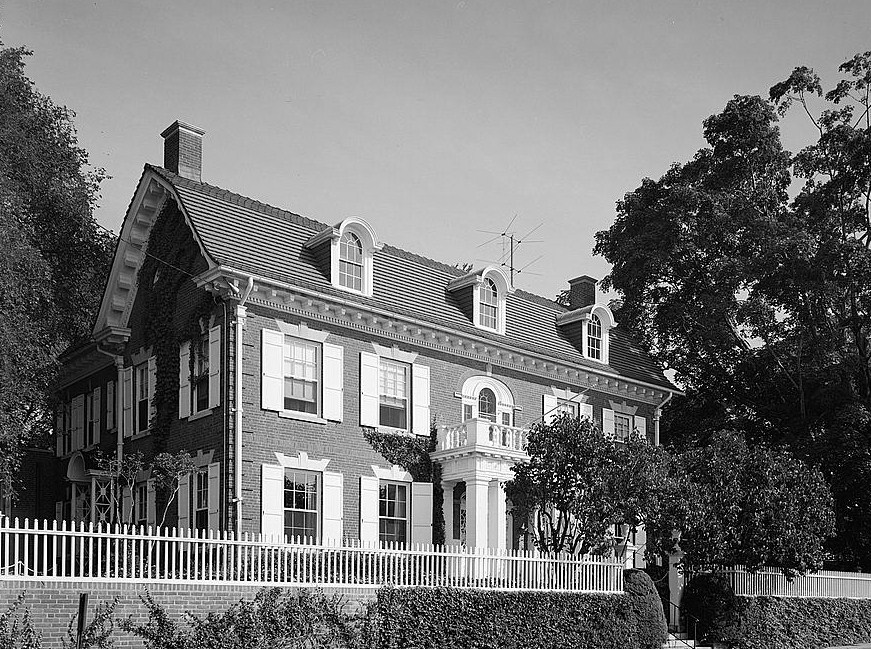
Wakeman Memorial, 648 Harbor Road

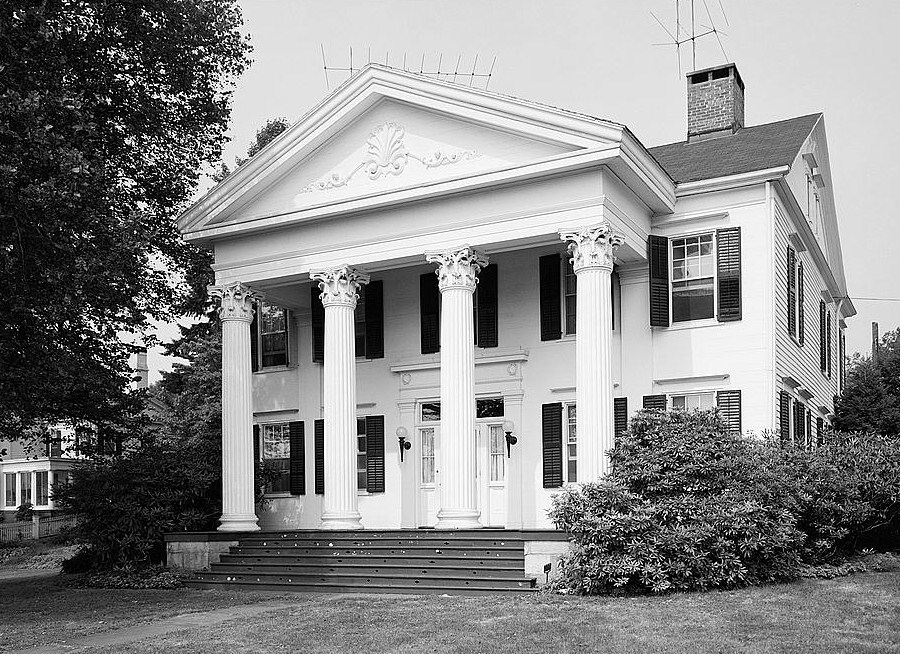
Austin Perry House, 712 Harbor Road

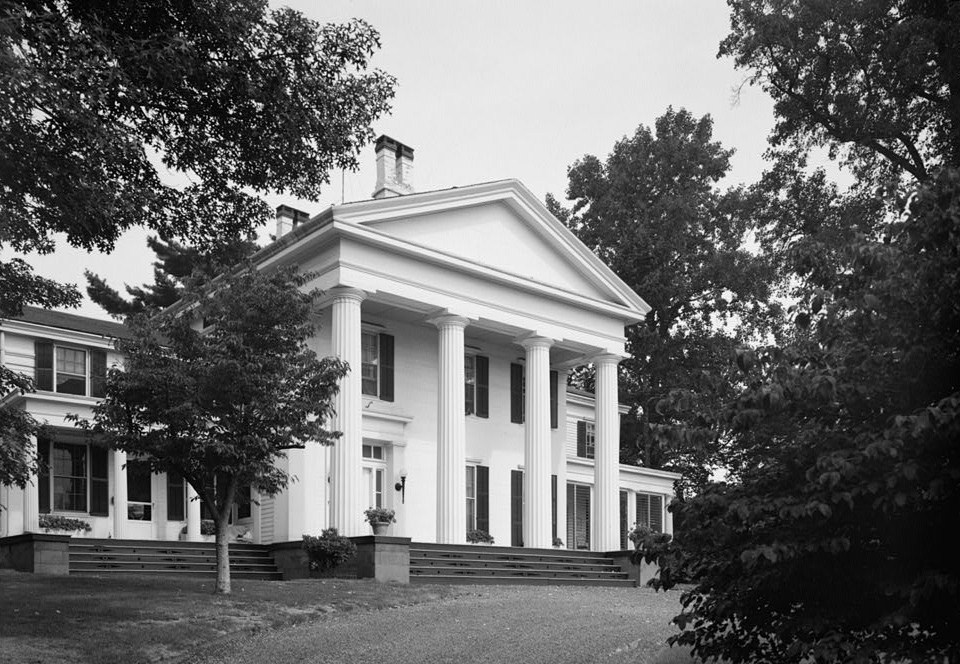
Oliver H. Perry House, 750 Harbor Road

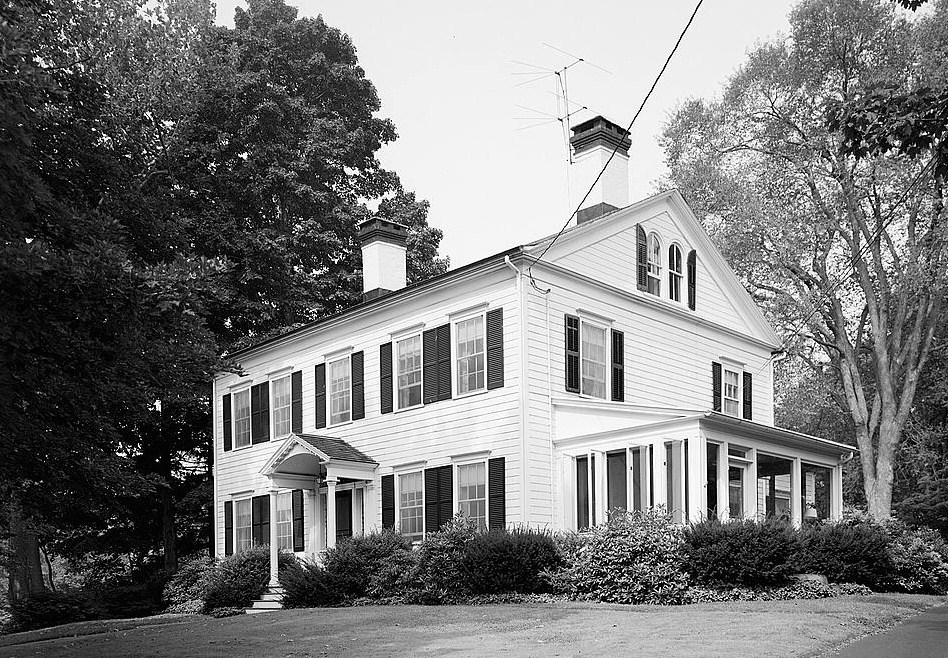
Gurdon Perry House, 780 Harbor Road

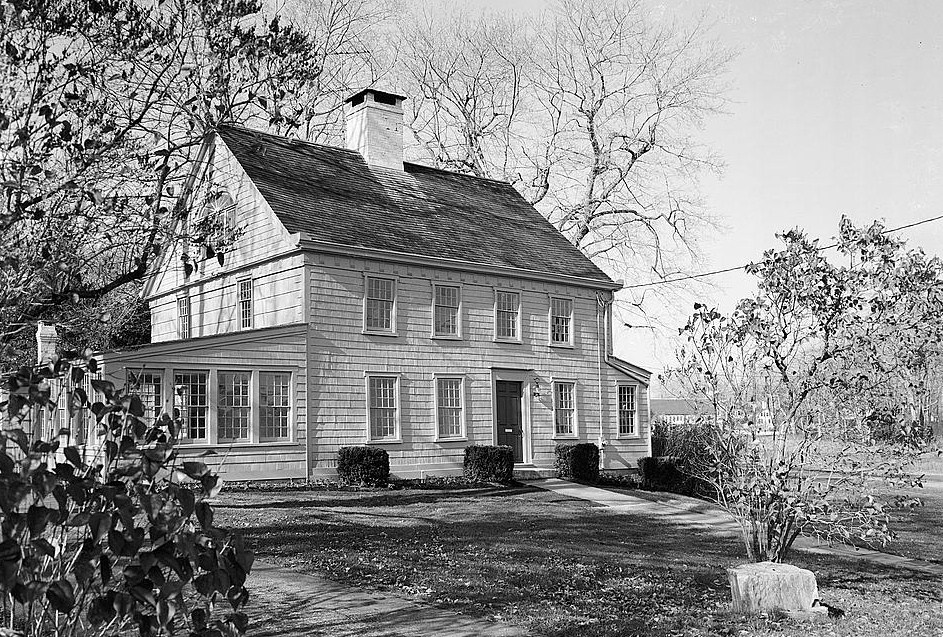
William Bulkley House, 824 Harbor Road

== Pequot Road ==
Part of Pequot Road is included in the district. Newer, commercial parts are not.

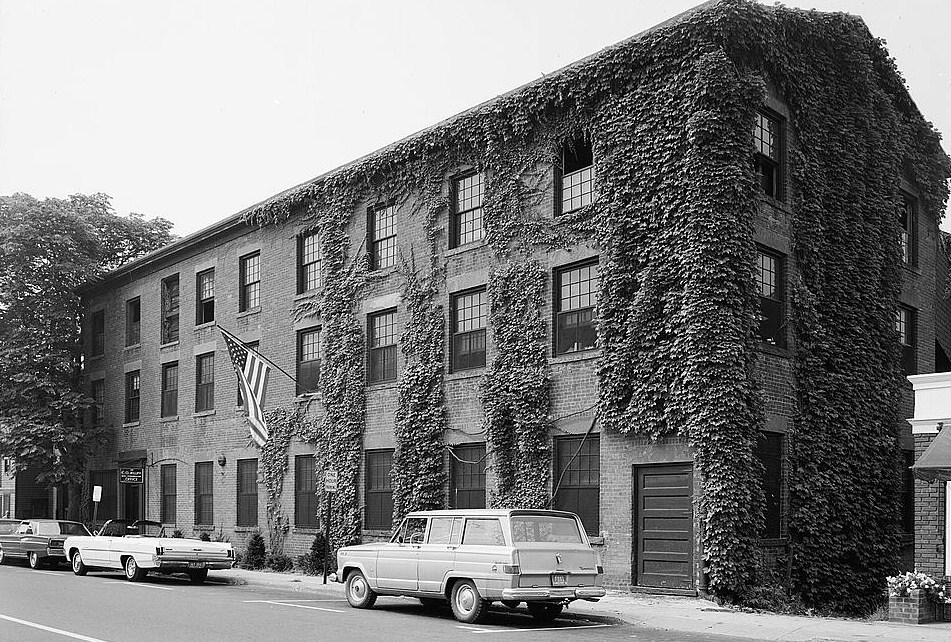
C. O. Jelliff Company, 354 Pequot Road

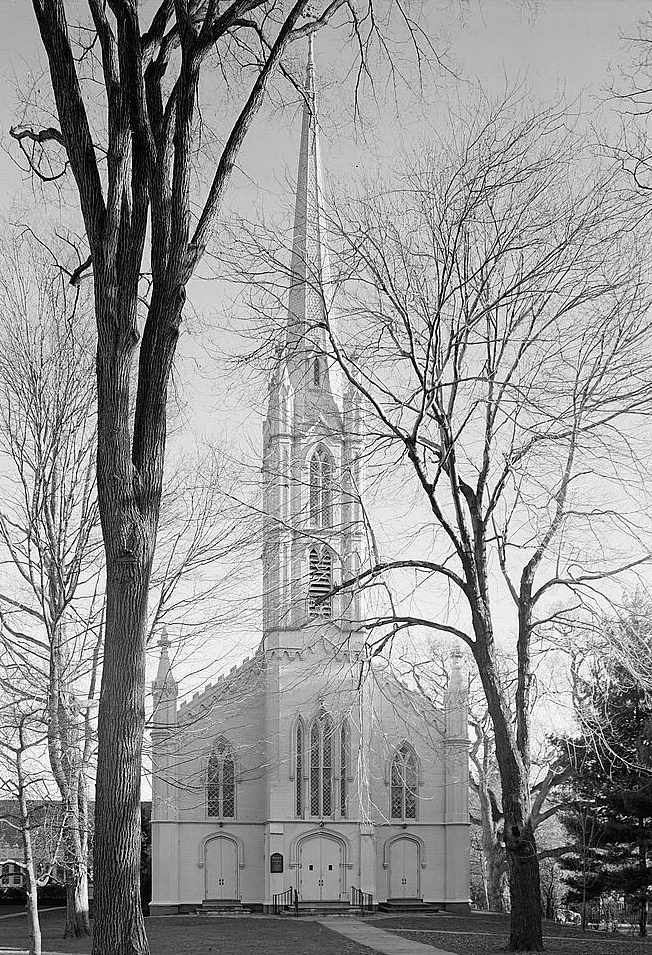
Trinity Church (P. E.), 651 Pequot Road

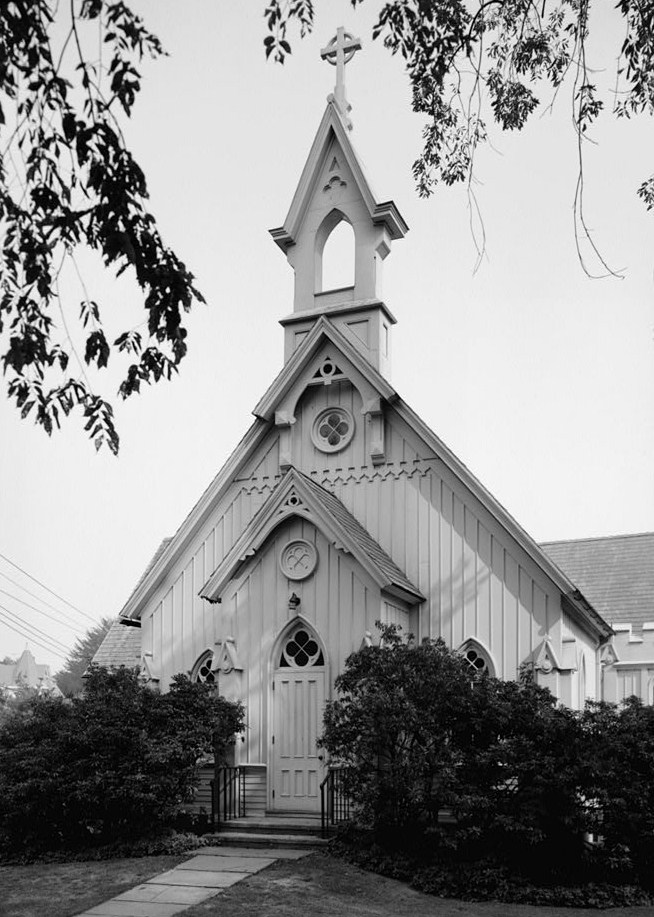
Trinity Parish Chapel, 651 Pequot Road

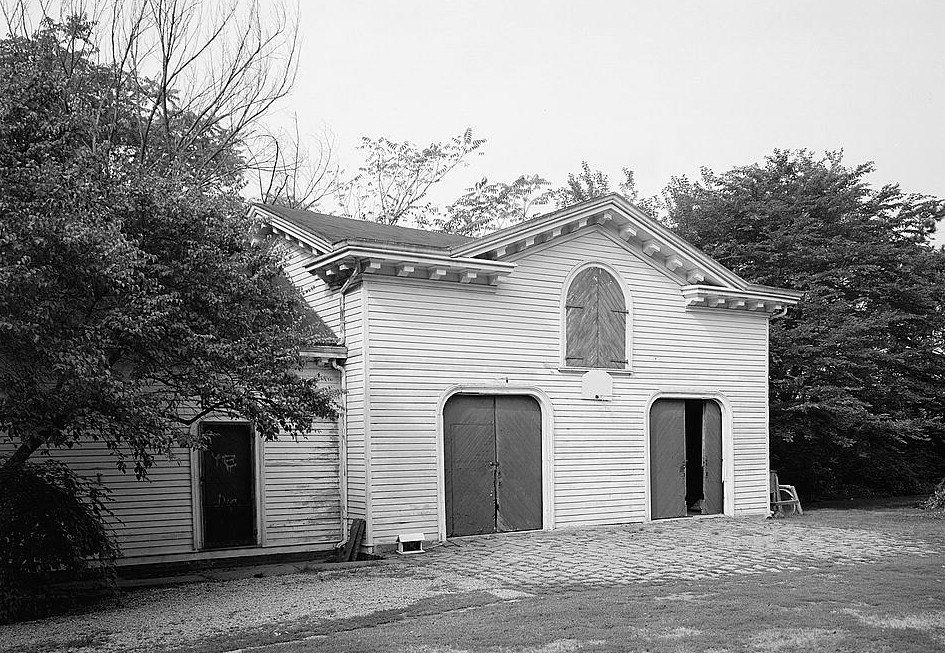
Benjamin Pomeroy Carriage House

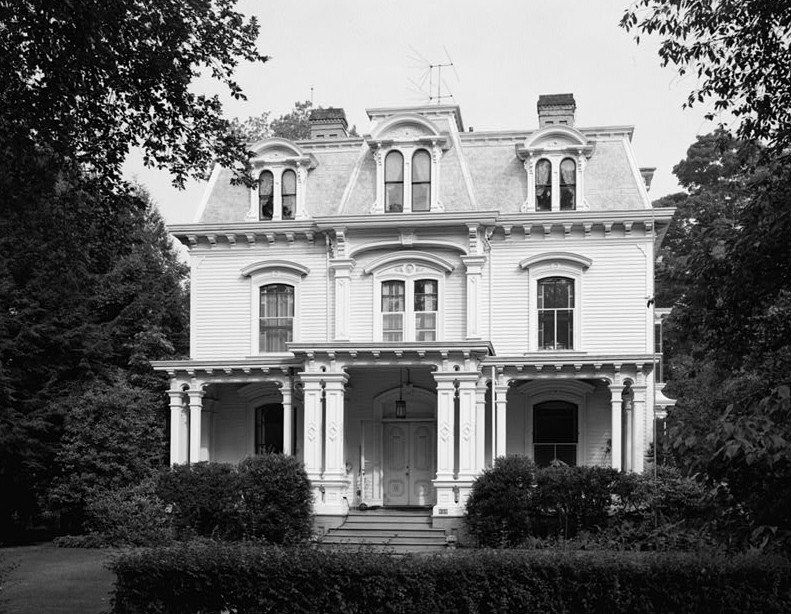
Benjamin Pomeroy House

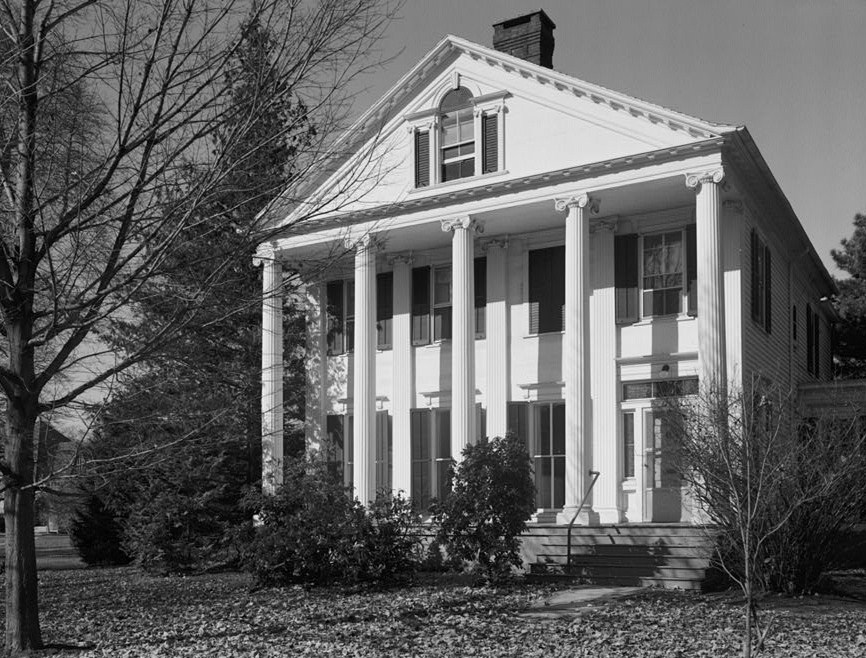
Francis D. Perry House, 678 Pequot Road

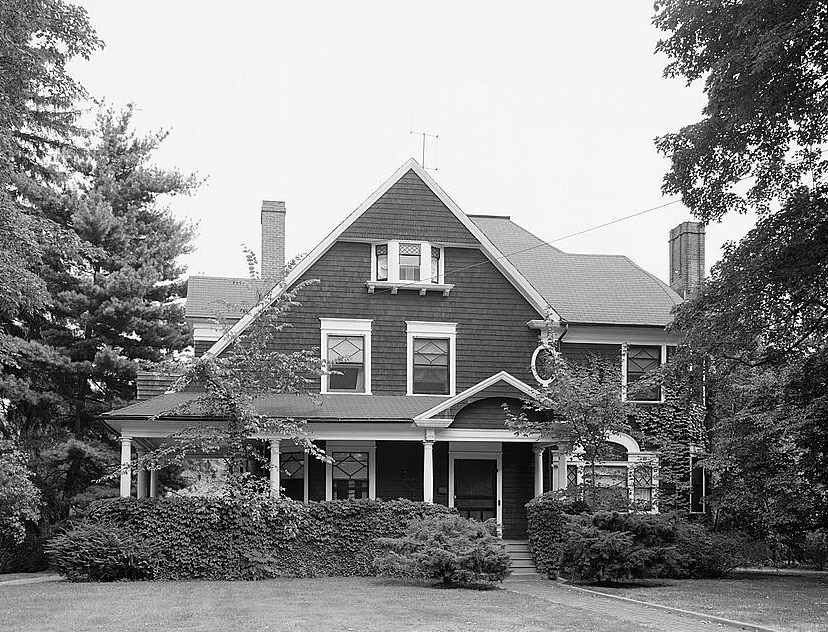
Oliver T. Sherwood House, 683 Pequot Road

== Gallery: Other ==
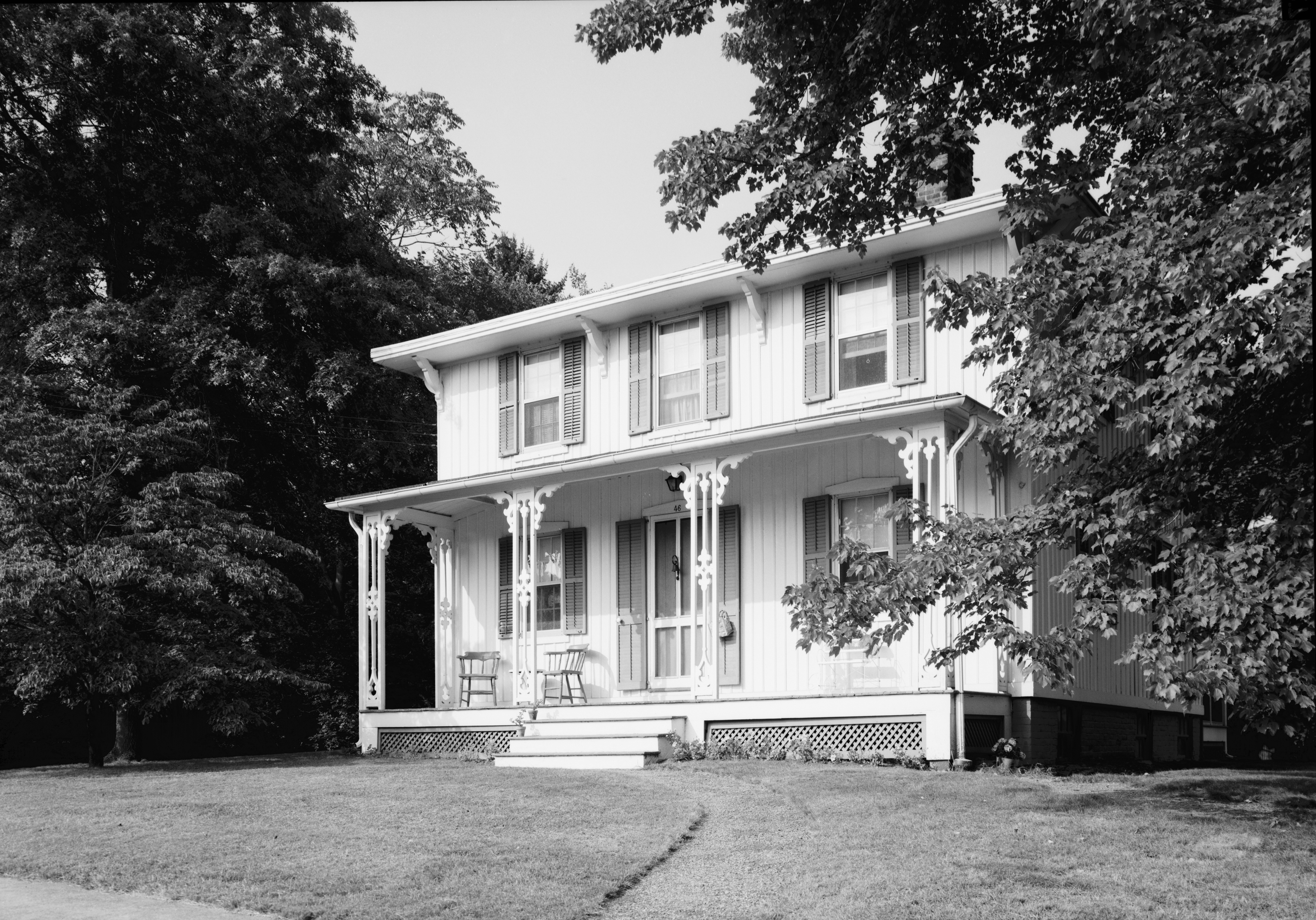
46 Station Street

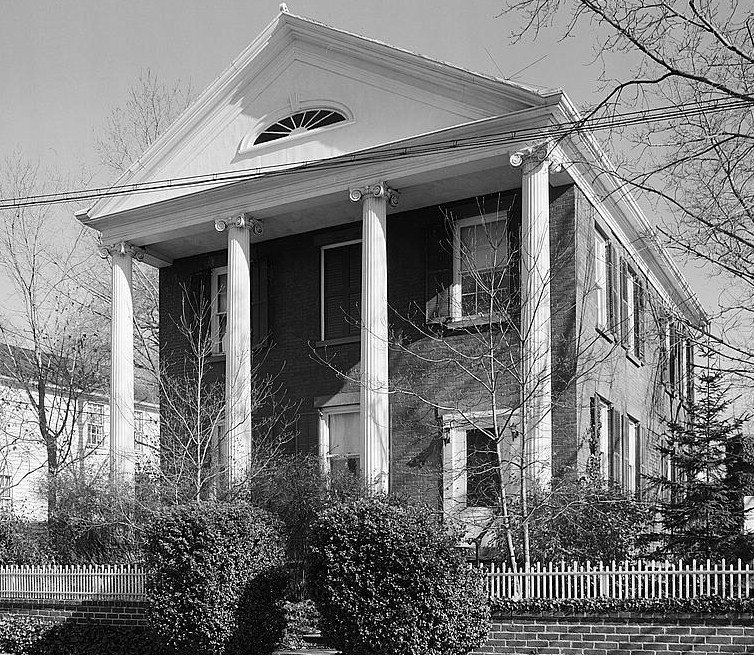
Connecticut Bank, Mill River Branch, 227 Main Street

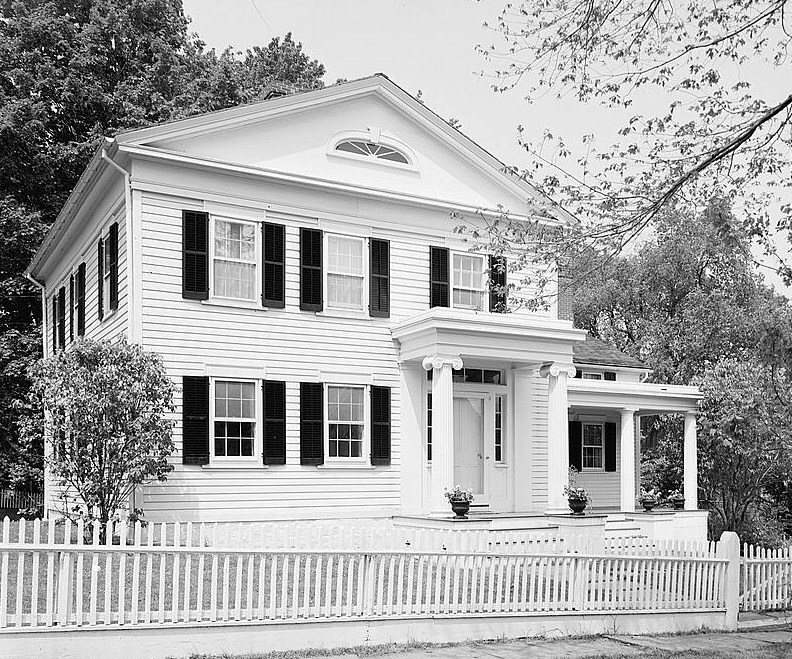
Francis Jelliff House, 212 Center Street

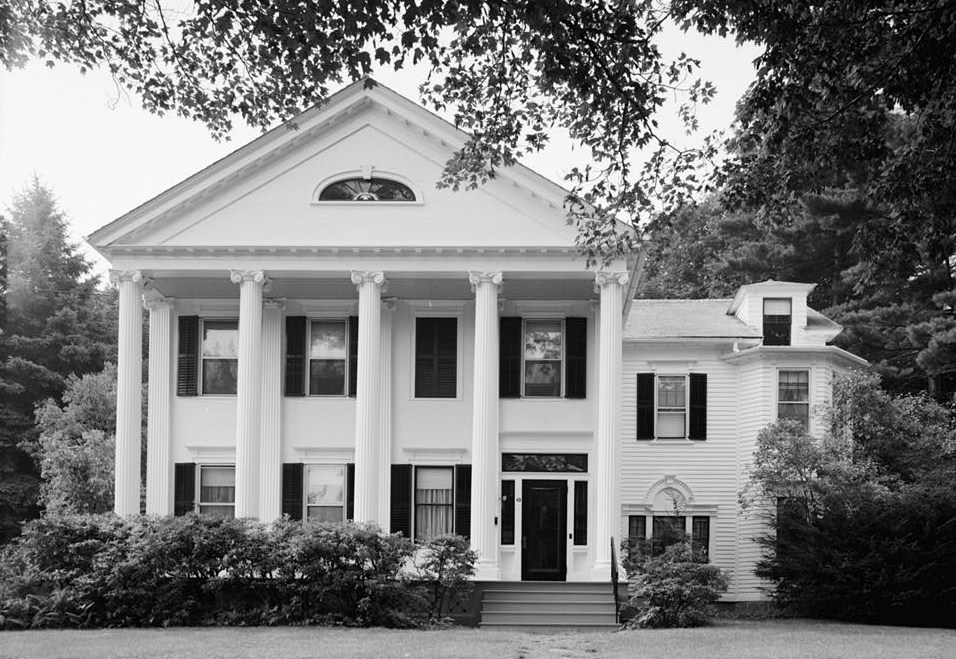
Henry Perry House, 45 Westway Road

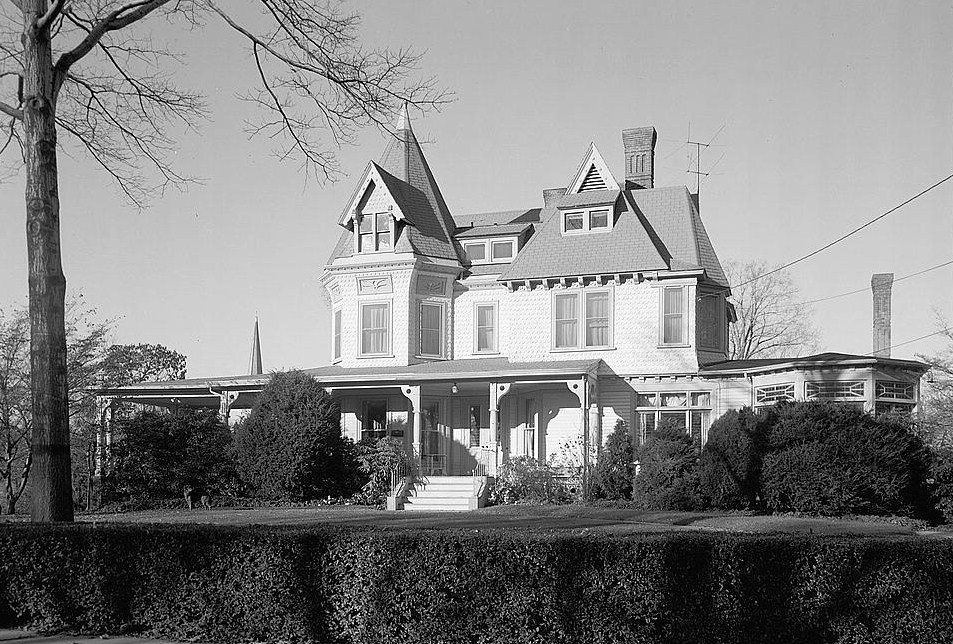
John Hoyt Perry House, 134 Center Street

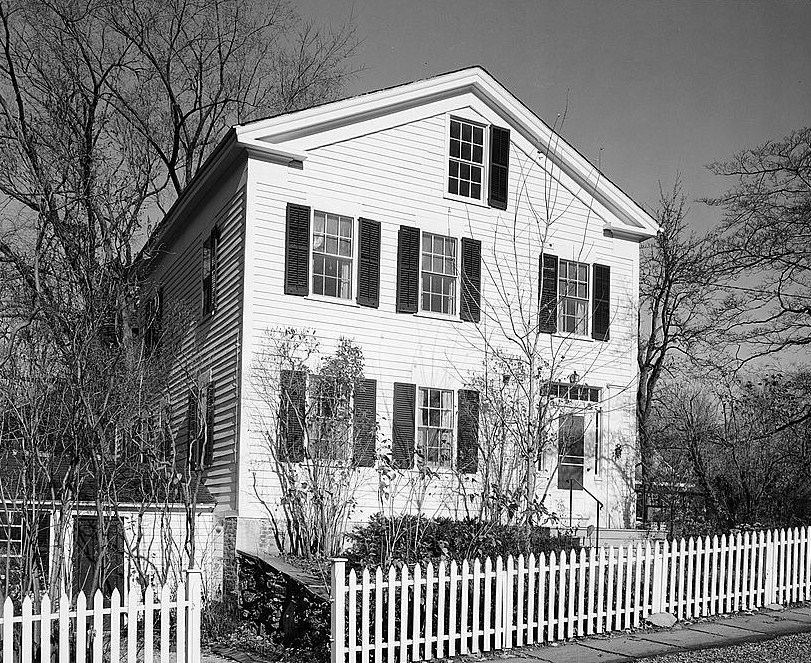
Julius Pike House, 62 Center Street

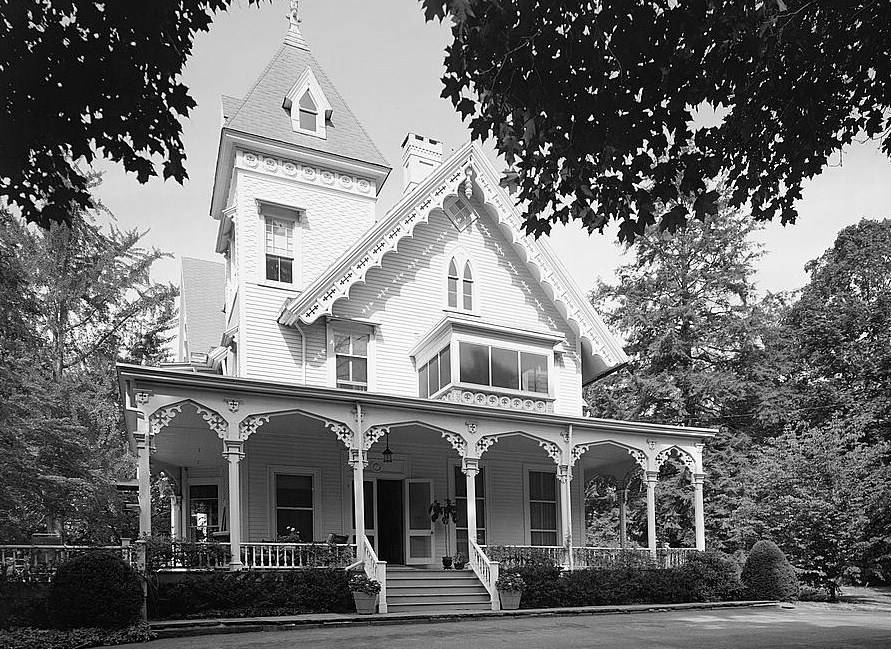
Moses Bulkley House, 176 Main Street

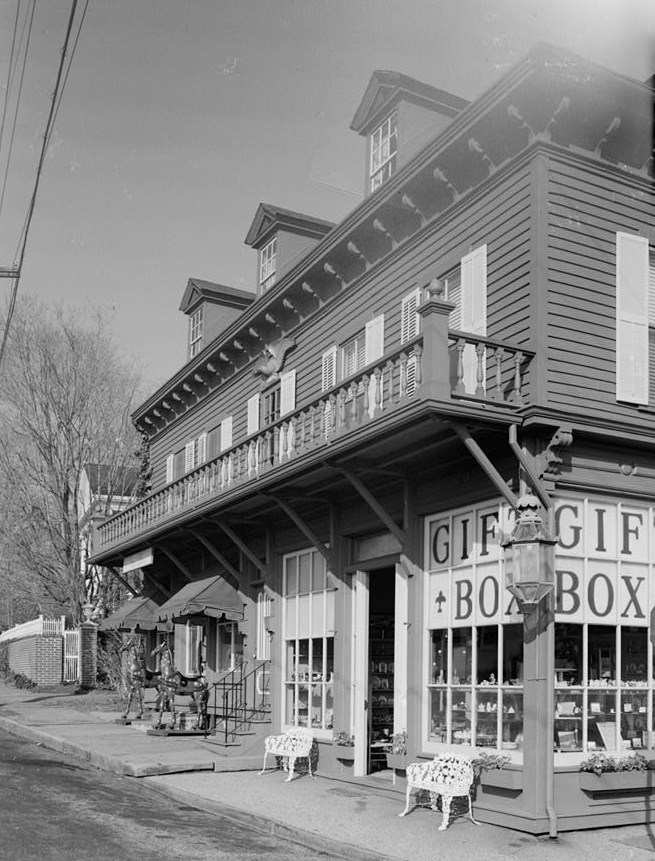
Nehemiah Jennings Block, 668-70 Main Street

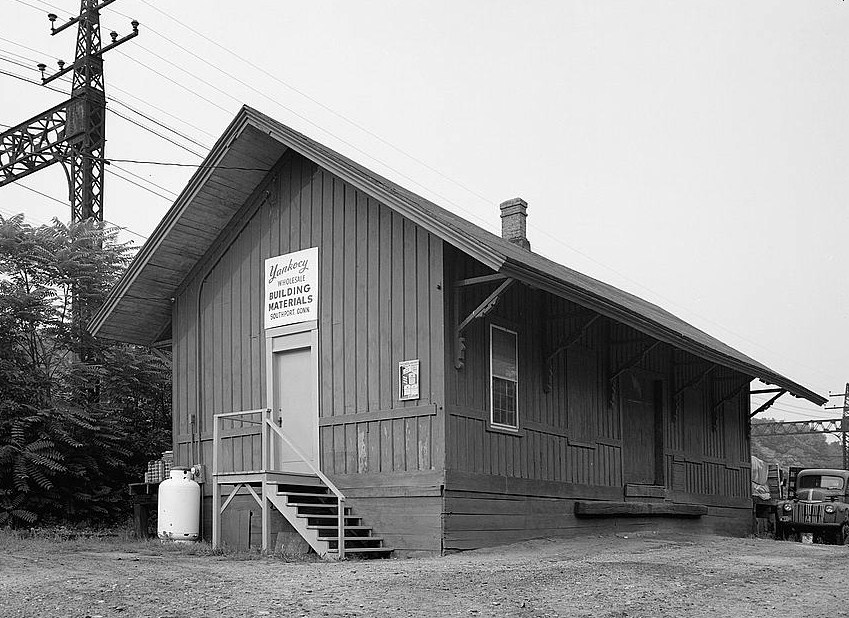
New York, New Haven & Hartford Railroad Freight House

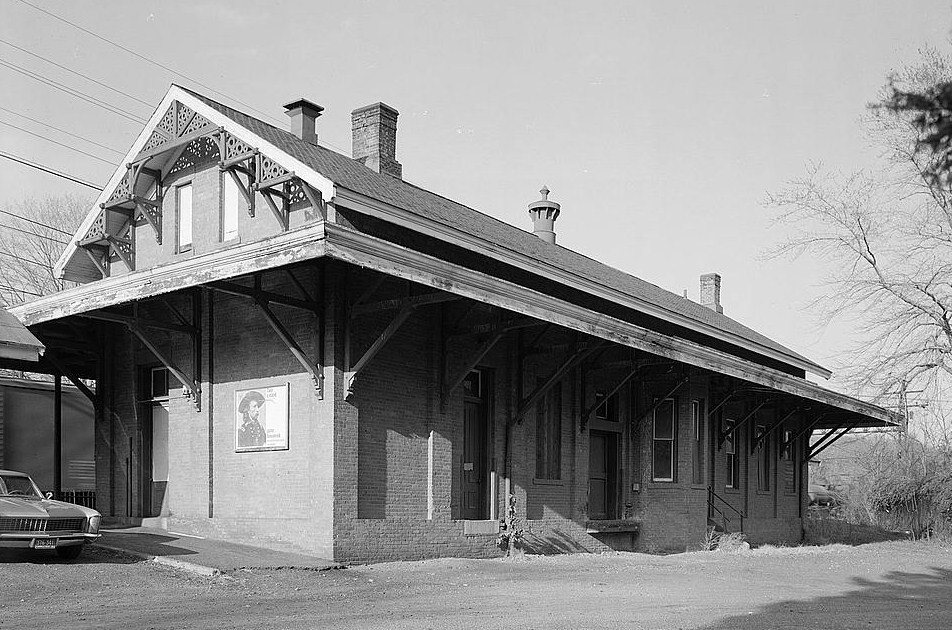
New York, New Haven & Hartford Railroad Station

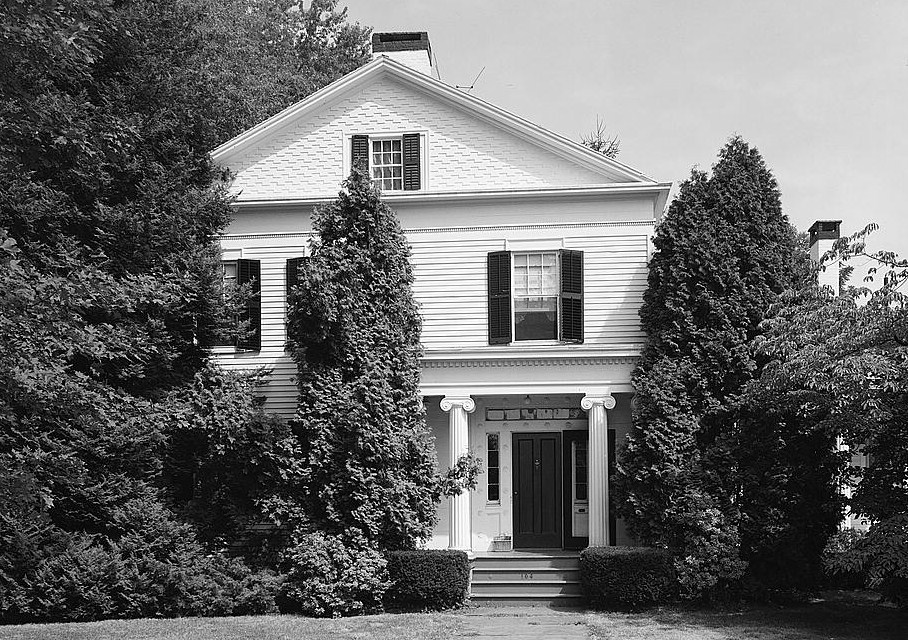
Paschal Sheffield House, 104 Old South Road

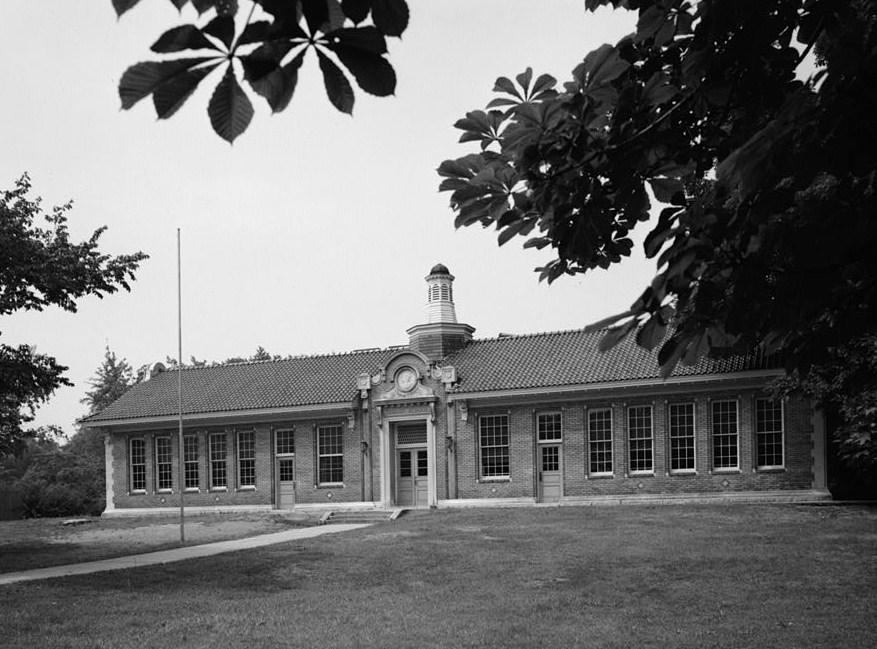
Pequot School, 214 Main Street

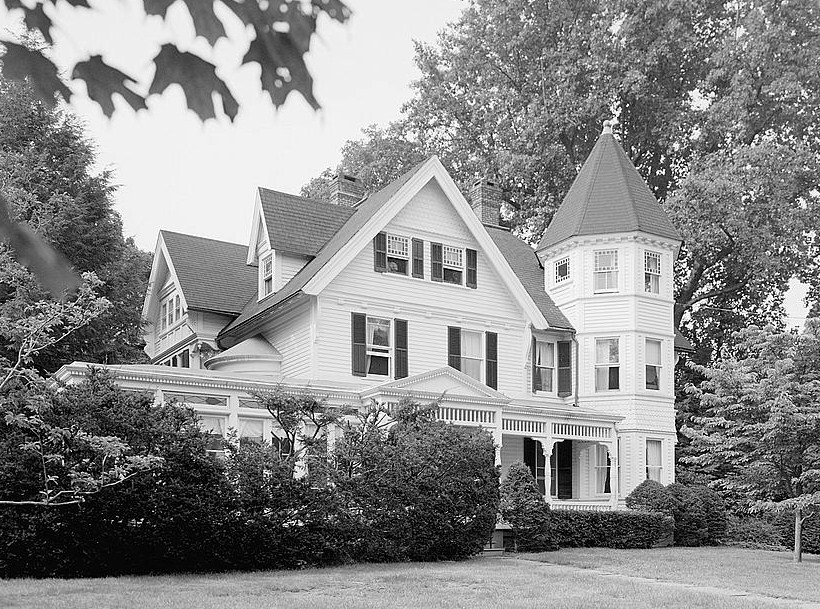
Simon C. Sherwood House, 67 Westway Road

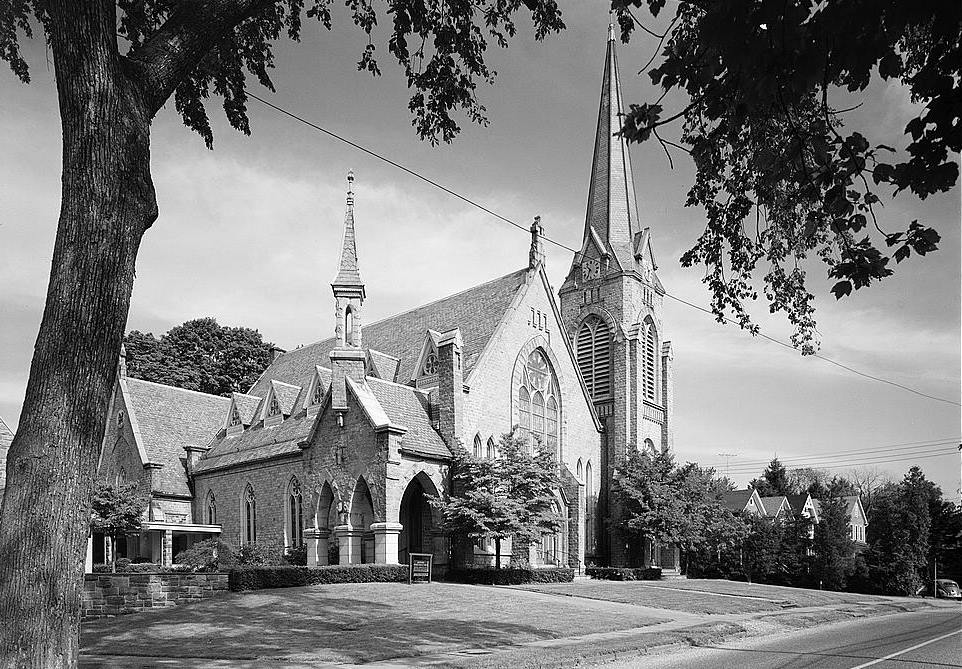
Southport Congregati...

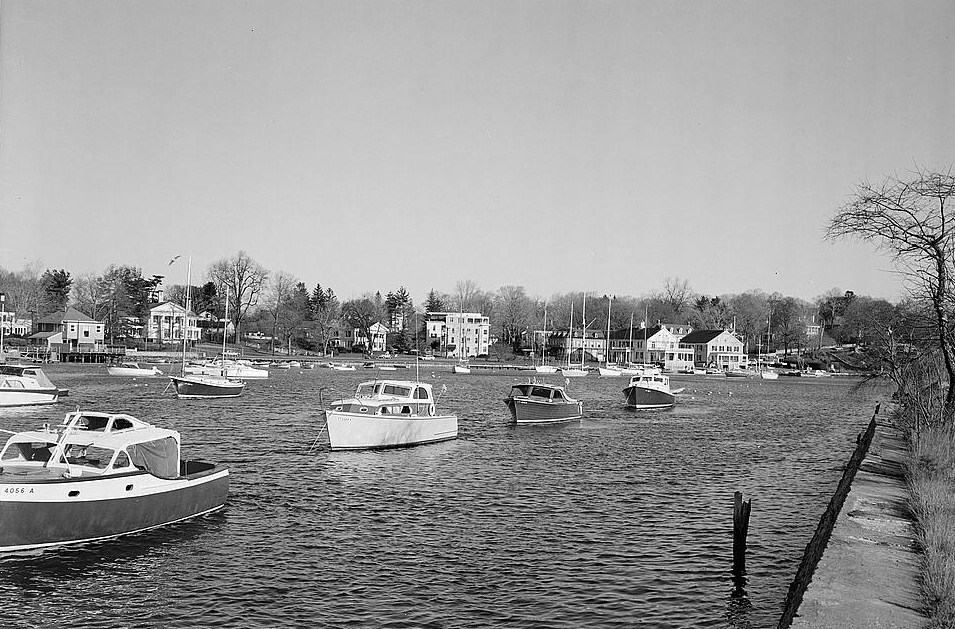
Southport Harbor, Mill River

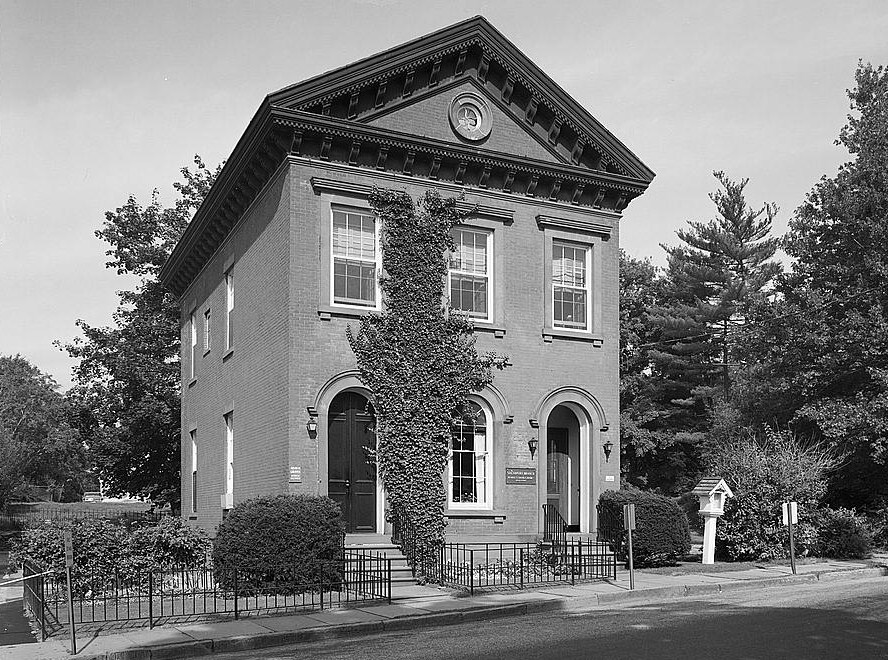
Southport Savings Bank, 226 Main Street

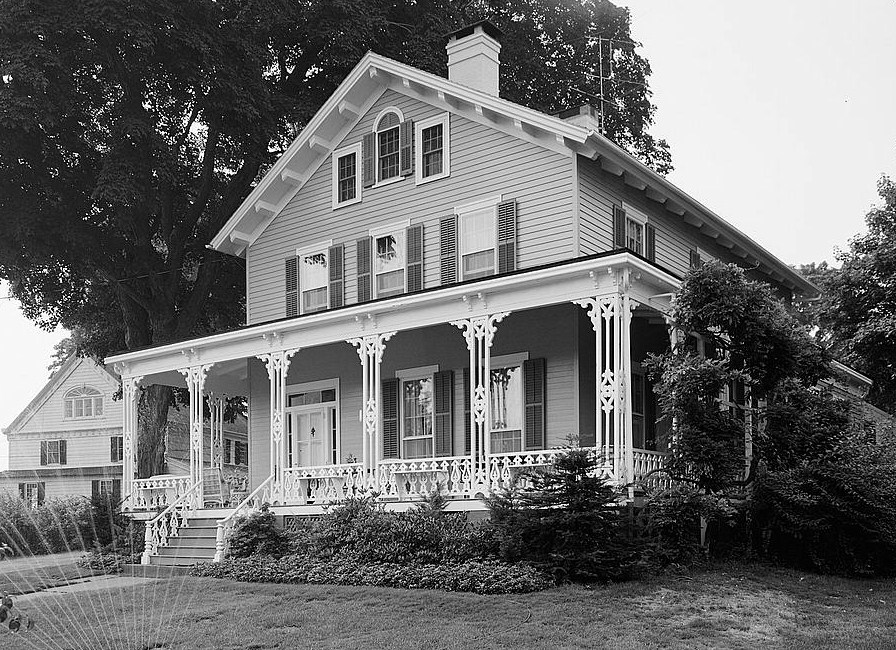
Wakeman B. Meeker House, 25 Westway Road

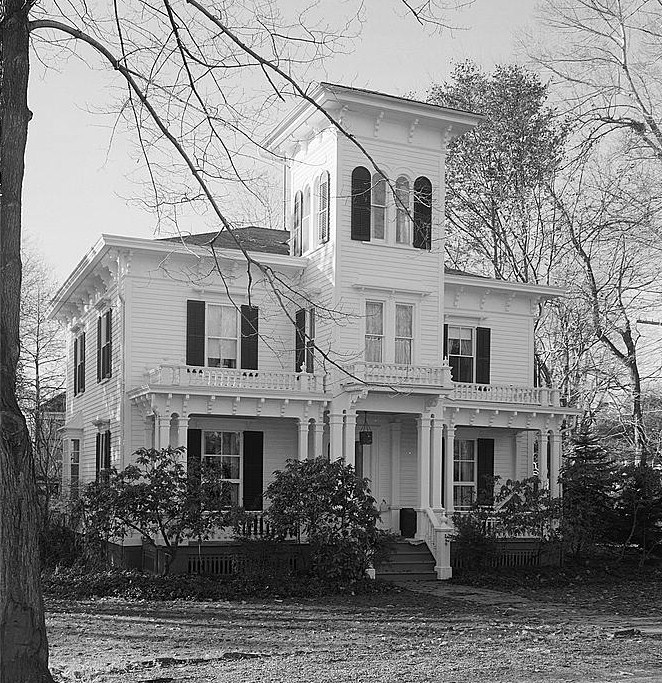
Waugh House, 249 Old South Road

== See also ==
- Greenfield Hill Historic District, 1 of 2 other historic districts in Fairfield covered by the same commission
- Fairfield Historic District (Fairfield, Connecticut), 2 of 2 other historic districts
- National Register of Historic Places listings in Fairfield County, Connecticut
