= Bronson Windmill =

- U.S. National Register of Historic Places
- U.S. Historic district – Contributing property
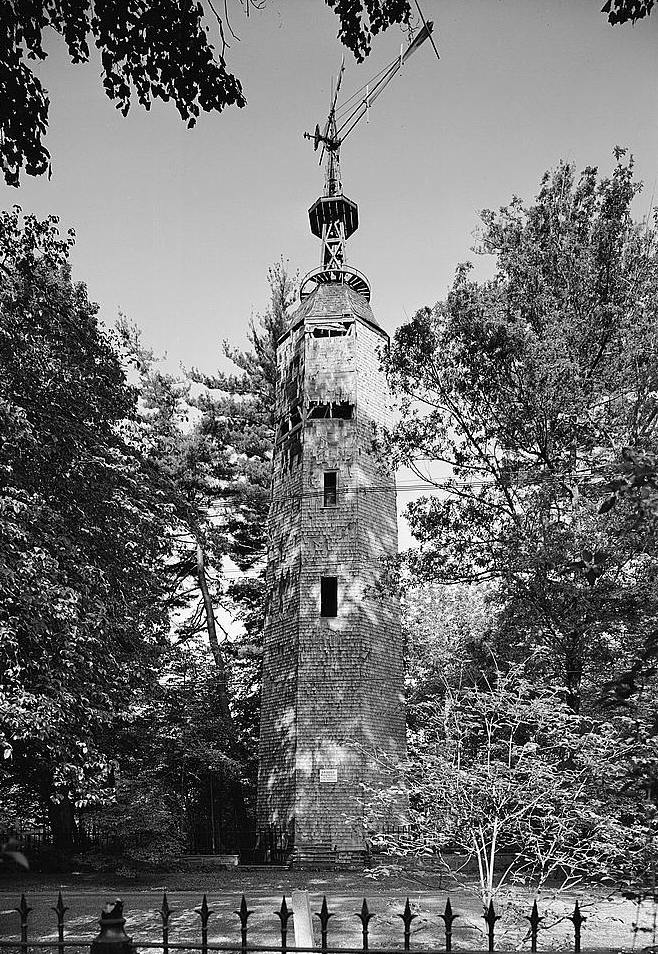
- Bronson Windmill in 1971

- Location within Connecticut Location within the United States
- Location: 3015 Bronson Road, Fairfield, Connecticut
- Coordinates: 41°10′21″N 73°17′32″W
- Area: less than one acre
- Built: 1893
- Architect: Corcoran Storm-Defying Windmills
- Part of: Greenfield Hill Historic District (ID71000899)
- NRHP reference No.: 71000896

Significant dates
- Added to NRHP: December 29, 1971
- Designated CP: March 11, 1971

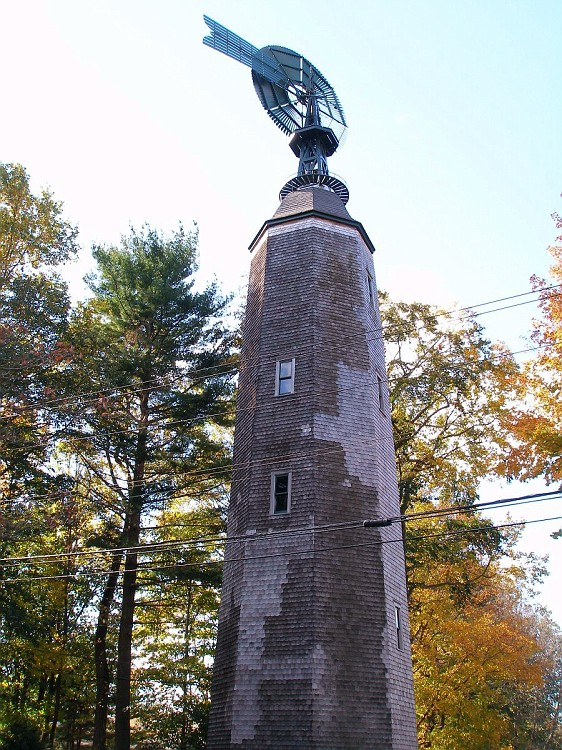

The Bronson Windmill is an historic windmill at 3015 Bronson Road in Fairfield, Connecticut. Built in 1893-94, it is the only surviving windmill in the town, out a number that once dotted the landscape. It was built for Frederic Bronson, owner of the local estate. The mill was listed on the National Register of Historic Places in 1971.

== Description and history ==
The Bronson Windmill stands on the west side of Bronson Road, opposite the Fairfield Country Day School. It is an octagonal structure about 80 feet (24 m) in height, with a base about 17.5 feet (5.3 m) in diameter. Its framing is Georgia pine, and it is anchored to the ground by locust beams set 6 feet (1.8 m) into the ground, which are fastened to the frame by iron rods. The sides, which telescope inward as the structure rises, are dotted with rectangular window openings. The sides are covered in wooden shingles, and rise to a cornice and domed roof, which is surmounted by a directional wind vane in the shape of a rooster. The blades of the mill are stored within the building. The mill was used to draw water into a cistern located below ground.

The mill was built in 1893-94 for Frederic Bronson to provide water for use on his large dairy farm, and is the only windmill in Fairfield (out of many that once dotted its landscape). It was built by the Corcoran Storm-Defying Windmills Company of New York City and Jersey City, New Jersey. Bronson's farm was large enough to require more water than rainfall typically supplied. Bronson had also built a large three-story estate house, and the mill was apparently scaled to match its grandeur.

== See also ==
- National Register of Historic Places listings in Fairfield County, Connecticut
