= Fairfield Historic District (Fairfield, Connecticut) =

Historic district in Connecticut, United States

- U.S. National Register of Historic Places
- U.S. Historic district
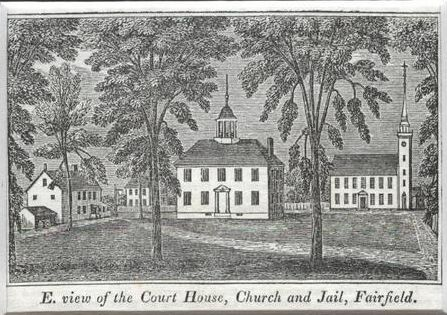
- c. 1840s woodcut of town center

- Location within Connecticut Location within the United States
- Location: Old Post Road from Post Road to Turney Road, Fairfield, Connecticut
- Coordinates: 41°8′38″N 73°14′59″W
- Area: 60 acres (24 ha)
- Architectural style: Greek Revival, Romanesque
- NRHP reference No.: 71000897
- Added to NRHP: March 24, 1971

The Fairfield Historic District encompasses the historic town center of Fairfield, Connecticut, roughly along Old Post Road between Route 1 and Turney Road. The area contains Fairfield's town hall, public library, and houses dating from the late 18th century, and includes portions of the town's earliest colonial settlement area. The district was listed on the National Register of Historic Places in 1971.

== History ==
Fairfield's town center was laid out in the 17th century by its founders, who included Roger Ludlow. The area was divided into Four Squares, one for Ludlow, one for a minister, one for civic buildings, and one for a town common. Elements of this early division survive in the layout and placement of civic and religious buildings. The village center was burned in 1779 by British troops during the American Revolutionary War, resulting in the destruction of all of the town's civic buildings and many houses. The district hosts a concentration of houses that did survive the military raid, and the town hall, built in 1794, is still evocative of the architecture of that period.

== Contributing elements ==
The district includes about 75 historically significant buildings on 35 acres (14 ha) of land. It extends from a junction of Old Post Road with US 1 in the west, to Turney Road in the east, and includes buildings on Old Post Road and a few cross streets. The most significant elements of the historic district include:

- the town green
- the town hall
- the Rising Sun Tavern, No. 1 Town Hall Green, built 1783
- Silliman House, 543 Old Post Road, built 1791 by William Silliman, son of militia general Gold Selleck Silliman
- the Fairfield Academy, now known as Old Academy, which was moved
- 249 Beach Road, which reportedly survived the British burning by a servant dowsing the flames (see photo page 15 of accompanying photos)
- 303 Beach Road
- 349 Beach Road, a saltbox house from before 1750
- Burr Mansion, 739 Old Post Road
- 952 Old Post Road
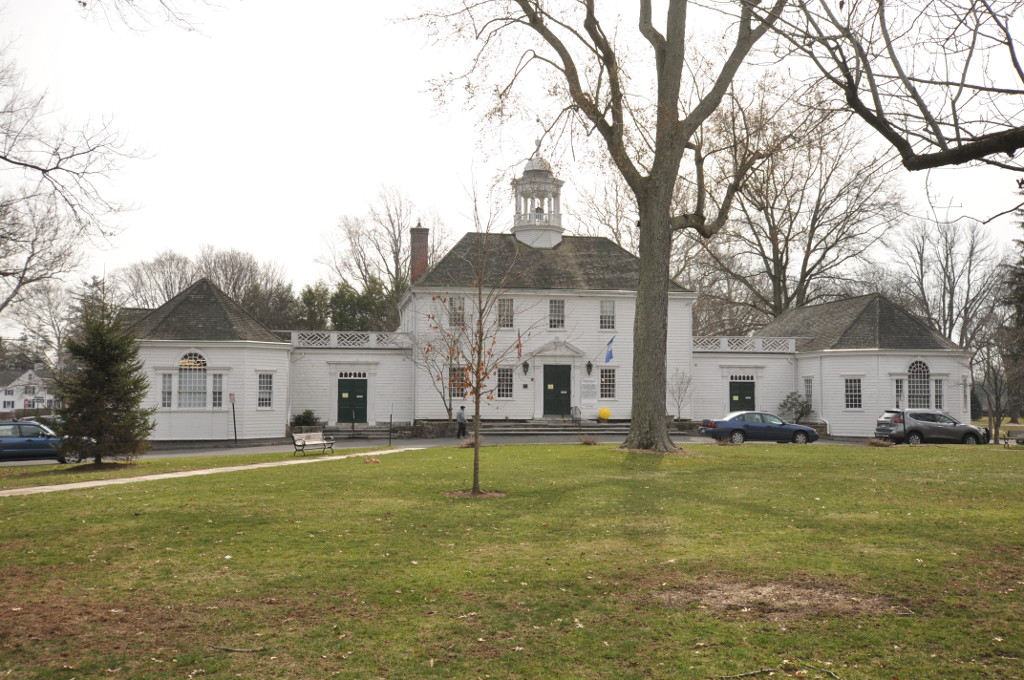
Town Hall

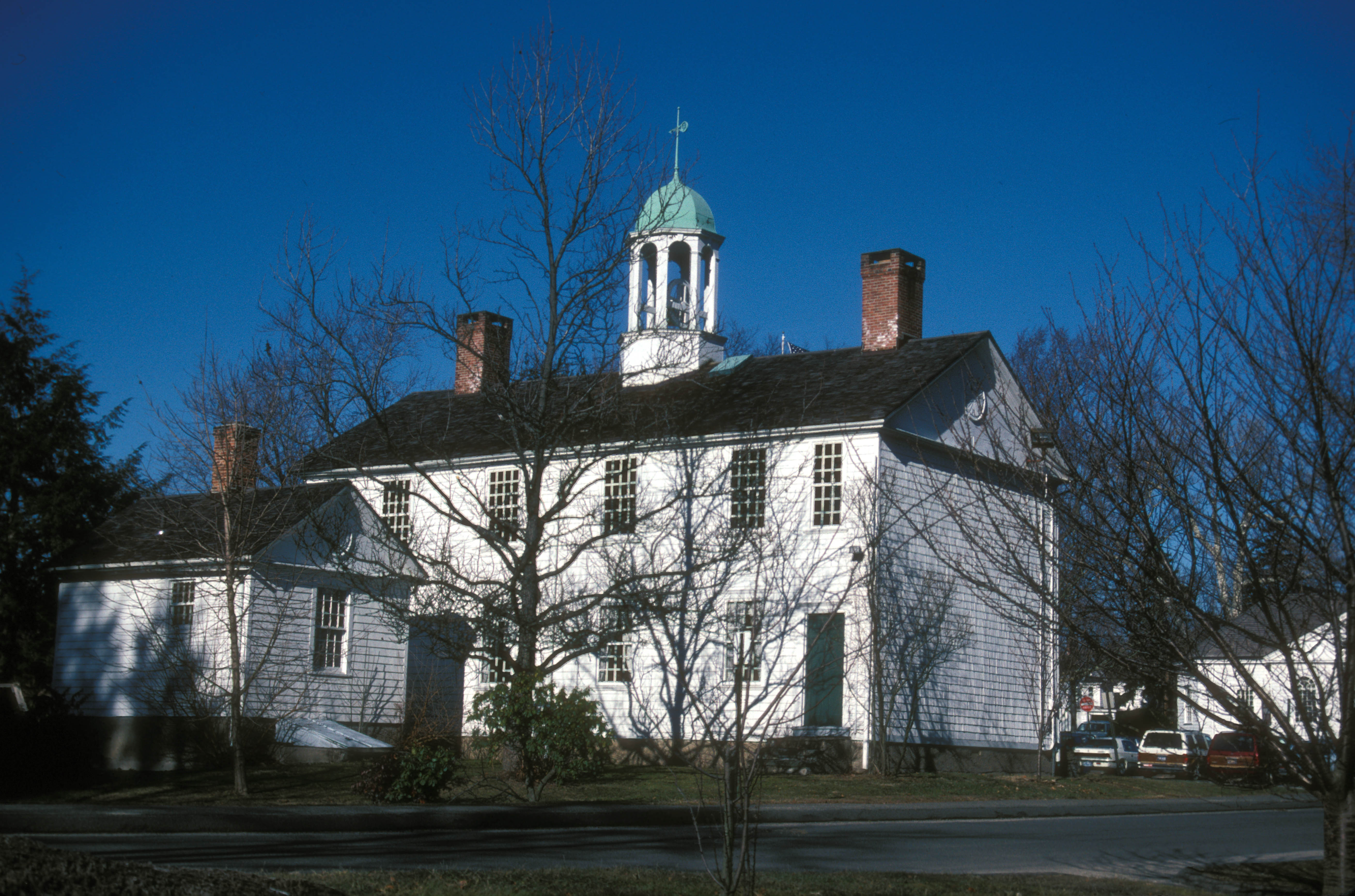
Old Academy

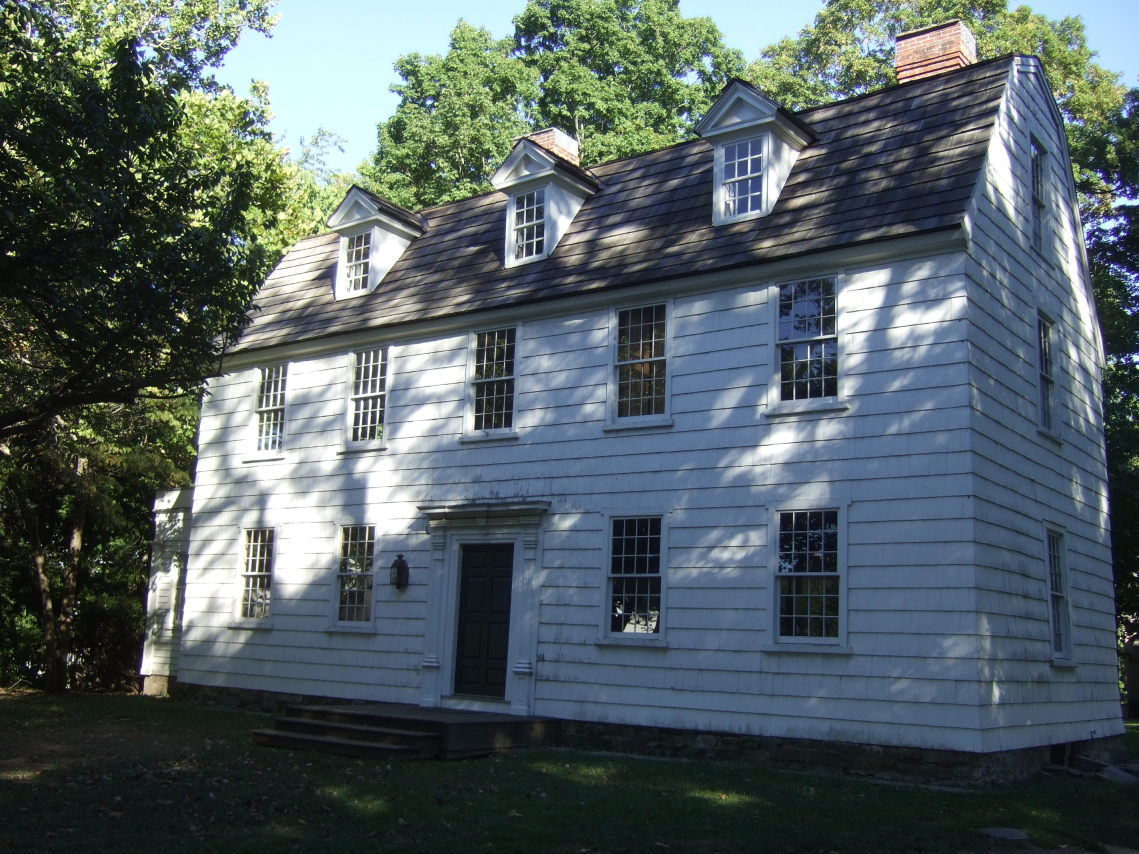
Sun Tavern

== See also ==
- National Register of Historic Places listings in Fairfield County, Connecticut
